= List of PlayStation Vita games (E–H) =

== Games list (E–H) ==
There are currently 1732 games across the lists of PlayStation Vita games.

For a chronological list, click the sort button in any of the available region's columns. Games dated December 17, 2011 (JP), February 15, 2012 (NA), and February 22, 2012 (EU) are launch titles of each region respectively.

Title	Genre(s)	Developer(s)	Publisher(s)	Release date			PS TV compat.	Ref.
Title	Genre(s)	Developer(s)	Publisher(s)	North America	Europe	Japan	PS TV compat.	Ref.
Earth Defense Force 2017 Portable	Third-person shooter	Sandlot	D3 Publisher	Jan 8, 2013	Jan 16, 2013	Sep 27, 2012	Yes	
Earth Defense Force 2: Invaders from Planet Space	Third-person shooter	Sandlot	D3 Publisher (JP); Xseed Games (NA); PQube (EU)	Dec 8, 2015	Feb 12, 2016	Dec 11, 2014	Yes	
Ecolibrium	Life simulation	Sony Computer Entertainment	Sony Computer Entertainment	Feb 12, 2013	Sep 12, 2012	Unreleased	No	
Eiyū Senki	Turn-based strategy	Tenco	5pb.	Unreleased	Unreleased	May 29, 2014	Yes	
ELEDiVE	Puzzle	Nihon Kogakuin College of Hachioji Development Team	Grasshopper Manufacture	Unreleased	Unreleased	June 21, 2012	No	
Element4l	Platform	I-Illusions	I-Illusions	Apr 7, 2015	Apr 8, 2015	Aug 6, 2015	Yes	
Emerald Shores	Platform	Fordesoft	Fordesoft	Dec 4, 2018	Unreleased	Unreleased	Yes	
EMMA: Lost in Memories	Platform	SandBloom Studio	JanduSoft	May 8, 2020	May 8, 2020	Unreleased	No	
End Sleep	Visual novel	Lilac Soft	Lilac Soft	Unreleased	Unreleased	Apr 27, 2017	Yes	
Energy Balance	Puzzle	Sometimes You	Sometimes You	Jul 12, 2017	Jul 12, 2017	Unreleased	Yes	
Energy Cycle	Puzzle	Sometimes You	Sometimes You	Jul 7, 2017	Jul 7, 2017	Unreleased	Yes	
Energy Cycle Edge	Puzzle	Sometimes You	Sometimes You	Dec 4, 2018	Dec 4, 2018	Unreleased	No	
Energy Invasion	Puzzle	Sometimes You	Sometimes You	Jan 10, 2018	Jan 10, 2018	Unreleased	Yes	
Enkan no Memoria: Kakera Tomoshi	Otome game	A'sRing	Dramatic Create	Unreleased	Unreleased	Mar 29, 2018	Yes	
Entwined	Rhythm	Pixelopus	Sony Computer Entertainment	Jul 22, 2014	Jul 23, 2014	Jul 24, 2014	Yes	
Ephemeral: Fantasy on Dark	Otome game	HuneX	Dramatic Create	Unreleased	Unreleased	Jan 18, 2018	Yes	
Epic Mickey 2: The Power of Two	Platform	Junction Point Studios, Blitz Games Studios	Sony Computer Entertainment	Jun 21, 2013	Jun 21, 2013	Unreleased	No	
Epic Word Search Collection	Puzzle	Lightwood Games	Lightwood Games	Mar 17, 2020	Unreleased	Unreleased	No	
Epic Word Search Collection 2	Puzzle	Lightwood Games	Lightwood Games	Jul 21, 2020	Unreleased	Unreleased	No	
Escape Plan	Puzzle	Fun Bits Interactive	Sony Computer Entertainment	Feb 15, 2012	Feb 22, 2012	Mar 1, 2012	No	
escapeVektor	Action	Nnooo	Nnooo (NA/EU); Arc System Works (JP)	Jan 22, 2013	Dec 19, 2012	Jan 16, 2014	Yes	
Ethan: Meteor Hunter	Platform	Seaven Studio	Seaven Studio	Apr 15, 2014	Apr 16, 2014	Unreleased	Yes	
Eufloria HD	Real-time strategy	Omni Systems Limited	Omni Systems Limited	Dec 17, 2013	Dec 18, 2013	Unreleased	No	
Eve: Burst Error R	Visual novel; Adventure	C's Ware	Red Flagship	Unreleased	Unreleased	Apr 28, 2016	Yes	
Eve: Rebirth Terror	Visual novel	C's Ware	Red Flagship	Unreleased	Unreleased	Apr 28, 2016	Yes	
Exile's End	Platform	Magnetic Realms	Xseed Games	Oct 25, 2016	Oct 26, 2016	Unreleased	Yes	
Exist Archive: The Other Side of the Sky	Role-playing	Spike Chunsoft, tri-Ace	Spike Chunsoft (JP); Aksys Games (NA/EU)	Oct 18, 2016	Oct 18, 2016	Dec 17, 2015	Yes	
Explosive Jake	Puzzle	Pigeon Dev Games	Lightwood Games	Mar 18, 2020	Mar 18, 2020	Unreleased	No	
Exstetra	Role-playing	FuRyu	FuRyu	Unreleased	Unreleased	Nov 7, 2013	Yes	
F1 2011	Racing	Codemasters Birmingham, Sumo Digital	Codemasters	Feb 15, 2012	Feb 22, 2012	Dec 17, 2011	Yes	
Factotum 90	Puzzle	Tacs Games, Poppy Works	Poppy Works	Sep 19, 2017	Oct 3, 2017	Unreleased	Yes	
Fairune	Action role-playing	Flyhigh Works	Circle Entertainment (JP); Qubic Games (NA/EU)	Apr 2, 2017	Mar 28, 2017	Apr 27, 2016	Yes	
Fallen Legion: Flames of Rebellion	Role-playing	YummyYummyTummy	Mintsphere	Jul 18, 2017	Jul 25, 2017	Unreleased	Yes	
Fantasy Hero: Unsigned Legacy	Action role-playing	Arc System Works	Arc System Works	Dec 2, 2014	Feb 11, 2015	Jul 3, 2014	Yes	
Farming Simulator	Simulation	Giants Software	Giants Software	Jul 2, 2013	May 8, 2013	Unreleased	Yes	
Farming Simulator 14	Simulation	Giants Software	Focus Home Interactive (NA/EU); Intergrow (JP)	Jun 24, 2014	Jun 4, 2014	Sep 25, 2014	North America/Europe only	
Farming Simulator 16	Simulation	Giants Software	Focus Home Interactive (NA/EU); Intergrow (JP)	Oct 6, 2015	Oct 7, 2015	Jun 9, 2016	Yes	
Farming Simulator 18	Simulation	Giants Software	Focus Home Interactive (NA/EU); Intergrow (JP)	Jun 6, 2017	Jun 6, 2017	Jul 20, 2017	Yes	
Fast Striker	Shooter	NGDEV	EastAsiaSoft	Oct 16, 2018	Oct 17, 2018	Oct 19, 2018	Yes	
Fata Morgana no Yakata: Collected Edition	Visual novel	Novectacle	Dramatic Create	Unreleased	Unreleased	Mar 16, 2017	Yes	
Fat City	Puzzle	Heavy Iron Studios	Heavy Iron Studios	Sep 8, 2015	Nov 3, 2015	Unreleased	Yes	
Fate/Extella Link	Action	Marvelous Interactive, Type-Moon	Marvelous Interactive	Mar 19, 2019	Mar 22, 2019	Jun 7, 2018	Yes	
Fate/Extella: The Umbral Star	Action	Marvelous Interactive, Type-Moon	Marvelous Interactive (JP); Xseed Games (NA)	Jan 17, 2017	Jan 20, 2017	Nov 10, 2016	Yes	
Fate/hollow ataraxia	Visual novel	Type-Moon	Type-Moon	Unreleased	Unreleased	Nov 27, 2014	Yes	
Fate/stay night [Réalta Nua]	Visual novel	Type-Moon	Kadokawa Games	Unreleased	Unreleased	Nov 29, 2012	Yes	
Fat Princess: Piece of Cake	Puzzle	One Loop Games; Santa Monica Studio	Sony Computer Entertainment	Jan 13, 2015	Jan 14, 2015	Unreleased	No	
Fernz Gate	Role-playing	Kemco	Kemco	Aug 28, 2018	Unreleased	Feb 8, 2019	No	
Fez	Puzzle	Polytron Corporation; BlitWorks	Polytron Corporation	Mar 25, 2014	Mar 26, 2014	Aug 20, 2014	Yes	
Fieldrunners 2	Tower defense	Subatomic Studios; Twitchy Thumbs Entertainment	Subatomic Studios	Dec 23, 2014	Dec 17, 2014	Unreleased	No	
FIFA 13	Sports	EA Canada	EA Sports	Sep 25, 2012	Sep 28, 2012	Oct 18, 2012	Yes	
FIFA 14: Legacy Edition	Sports	EA Canada	EA Sports	Sep 24, 2013	Sep 27, 2013	Oct 17, 2013	Yes	
FIFA 15: Legacy Edition	Sports	EA Canada	EA Sports	Sep 24, 2014	Sep 25, 2014	Oct 9, 2014	No	
FIFA Football	Sports	EA Canada	EA Sports	Feb 15, 2012	Feb 22, 2012	Mar 15, 2012	Yes	
Fifty Words by POWGI	Puzzle	Lightwood Games	Lightwood Games	Sep 3, 2019	Sep 3, 2019	Unreleased	No	
Fill-a-Pix: Phil's Epic Adventure	Puzzle	Lightwood Games	Lightwood Games	Jul 24, 2018	Jul 25, 2018	Unreleased	Yes	
Final Fantasy X HD	Role-playing	Square Enix 1st Production Department, Virtuos	Square Enix	Mar 18, 2014	Mar 21, 2014	Dec 26, 2013	Yes	
Final Fantasy X-2 HD	Role-playing	Square Enix 1st Production Department, Virtuos	Square Enix	Mar 18, 2014	Mar 21, 2014	Dec 26, 2013	Yes	
Final Horizon	Real-time strategy	Eiconic Games	Eiconic Games	Dec 2, 2014	Dec 3, 2014	Jan 14, 2015	Yes	
Fireworks	Arcade	Exient Entertainment	Sony Computer Entertainment	Feb 21, 2012	Feb 22, 2012	Jun 28, 2012	No	
Flame Over	Roguelike	Laughing Jackal	Laughing Jackal	Mar 10, 2015	Mar 11, 2015	Jun 8, 2016	Yes	
Floating Cloud God Saves the Pilgrims in HD!	Action	Dakko Dakko	Dakko Dakko	Aug 27, 2013	Aug 7, 2013	Unreleased	Yes	
Floral Flowlove	Visual novel	Saga Planets	Entergram	Unreleased	Unreleased	Aug 23, 2018	Yes	
Flow	Life simulation	Thatgamecompany, SuperVillain Studios	Sony Computer Entertainment	Dec 17, 2013	Dec 4, 2013	Feb 22, 2014	No	
Flower	Adventure	Thatgamecompany, Bluepoint Games	Sony Computer Entertainment	Nov 12, 2013	Nov 29, 2013	Feb 22, 2014	No	
Flowers: Le volume sur printemps	Visual novel	Innocent Grey	Prototype	Unreleased	Unreleased	Oct 9, 2014	Yes	
Flowers: Le Volume sur Automne	Visual novel	Innocent Grey	Prototype	Unreleased	Unreleased	Nov 17, 2016	Yes	
Flowers: Le Volume sur Été	Visual novel	Innocent Grey	Prototype	Unreleased	Unreleased	Oct 22, 2015	Yes	
Flowers: Le Volume sur Hiver	Visual novel	Innocent Grey	Prototype	Unreleased	Unreleased	Mar 16, 2018	Yes	
Flyhunter Origins	Platform	Steel Wool Games	Ripstone	Dec 9, 2014	Dec 10, 2014	Unreleased	Yes	
Flying Hamster HD	Action	The Game Atelier	The Game Atelier	Jun 11, 2013	Dec 19, 2012	Unreleased	No	
Foosball 2012	Sports	Grip Games	Grip Games	Jul 24, 2012	Jul 25, 2012	Unreleased	Yes	
Football Game	Adventure	Cloak and Dagger Games	Cloak and Dagger Games	Nov 5, 2019	Unreleased	Unreleased	No	
Football Manager Classic 2014	Simulation	Sports Interactive	Sega	May 6, 2014	Apr 11, 2014	Unreleased	No	
Forma.8	Action-adventure	MixedBag Games	MixedBag Games	Feb 23, 2017	Feb 23, 2017	Unreleased	Yes	
Fort Defense	Real-time strategy	Creobit	4 Hit	Feb 11, 2014	Nov 27, 2013	Unreleased	Yes	
Fort Defense North Menace (Note: Stand-alone expansion for Fort Defense.)	Real-time strategy	Creobit	4 Hit	Mar 11, 2014	Feb 19, 2014	Unreleased	Yes	
Fortissimo	Otome game	Kadokawa Games, ASCII Media Works	Idea Factory	Unreleased	Unreleased	Mar 8, 2018	Yes	
Foul Play	Adventure	Mediatonic	Devolver Digital	Feb 23, 2016	Feb 23, 2016	Unreleased	Yes	
Foxyland	Platform	Will O'Neill	Ratalaika Games	Nov 27, 2019	Nov 27, 2019	Unreleased	No	
Foxyland 2	Platform	BUG-Studio	Ratalaika Games	Jan 21, 2020	Jan 21, 2020	Jan 21, 2020	No	
Frane: Dragons' Odyssey	Role-Playing	Kemco	Kemco	May 7, 2019	Unreleased	Apr 5, 2019	No	
Freedom Wars	Action role-playing	Japan Studio, Shift, Dimps	Sony Computer Entertainment	Oct 28, 2014	Oct 31, 2014	Jun 26, 2014	Yes	
Frobisher Says!	Puzzle	Honeyslug	Sony Computer Entertainment	Oct 23, 2012	Feb 22, 2012	Unreleased	No	
Frozen Synapse: Prime	Turn-based strategy	Mode 7 Games, Double Eleven	Double Eleven	Sep 23, 2014	Sep 23, 2014	Sep 24, 2014	Yes	
Fruit Ninja	Arcade	Halfbrick Studios, Big Ant Studios	Big Ant Studios	Aug 13, 2013	Aug 14, 2013	Unreleased	No	
FullBlast	Shooter	Ufo Crash Games, Ratalaika Games	Ratalaika Games	Sep 4, 2018	Unreleased	Unreleased	No	
Full Kiss	Visual novel	Giga	Entergram	Unreleased	Unreleased	Mar 28, 2019	No	
Full Throttle Remastered	Adventure	LucasArts, Double Fine Productions	Double Fine Productions	Apr 18, 2017	Apr 18, 2017	Unreleased	No	
Funk of Titans	Platform	A Crowd of Monsters	Merge Games	Jun 21, 2016	Jun 22, 2016	Unreleased	Yes	
Fureraba: Friend to Lover	Visual novel; Dating sim	Smee	Kaga Create	Unreleased	Unreleased	Mar 26, 2015	Yes	
Furmins	Puzzle	Housemarque, Beatshapers	Beatshapers	Oct 31, 2013	Oct 30, 2013	Unreleased	Yes	
Furwind	Platform	JanduSoft, Beatshapers	JanduSoft	Jun 31, 2019	Jun 30, 2019	Unreleased	Yes	
Furuki Yoki Jidai no Bōkentan	Role-playing	Daidai	Daidai	Unreleased	Unreleased	Dec 15, 2016	Yes	
Furuiro Meikyū Rondo: La Roue de fortune	Visual novel	Yatagarasu	Yeti	Unreleased	Unreleased	Sep 26, 2013	Yes	
Futagoza no Paradox	Visual novel	Cotton Soft	Entergram	Unreleased	Unreleased	Aug 24, 2017	Yes	
Futuridium EP Deluxe	Shooter	MixedBag Games	MixedBag Games	Sep 30, 2014	Oct 1, 2014	Unreleased	Yes	
Fuuraiki 3	Visual novel; Adventure	FOG Inc.	Nippon Ichi Software	Unreleased	Unreleased	Feb 19, 2015	No	
Gakuen Club: Himitsu no Nightclub	Otome game	Opera House	Dramatic Create	Unreleased	Unreleased	Nov 30, 2017	Yes	
Gakuen Heaven: Boy's Love Scramble!	Otome game	Spray	Prototype	Unreleased	Unreleased	Feb 11, 2015	Yes	
Gakuen Heaven 2: Double Scramble	Otome game	Spray	Prototype	Unreleased	Unreleased	Apr 23, 2015	Yes	
Gakuen K: Wonderful School Days V Edition	Otome game	Ichi Column, Otomate	Idea Factory	Unreleased	Unreleased	Dec 17, 2015	Yes	
Gal*Gun: Double Peace	Rail shooter	Inti Creates	JP: Alchemist; WW: PQube	Aug 2, 2016	Jul 20, 2016	Aug 6, 2015	No	
Gal Gunvolt	Platform	Inti Creates	Inti Creates	Unreleased	Unreleased	Aug 6, 2015	Yes	
Galleria no Chika: Meikyuu to Majo no Ryodan	Role-playing	Nippon Ichi Software	Nippon Ichi Software	Unreleased	Unreleased	Nov 26, 2020	No	
Galtia V Edition	Visual novel	Grisedge	Dramatic Create	Unreleased	Unreleased	Mar 29, 2018	Yes	
Ganbare! Super Strikers	Sports	rese	Ratalaika Games	Feb 25, 2020	Unreleased	Unreleased	No	
Garou: Mark of the Wolves	Fighting	SNK, Code Mystics	SNK	Dec 3, 2016	Dec 3, 2016	Dec 3, 2016	Yes	
Geki Yaba Runner	Runner	Qubic Games	Qubic Games	Jan 31, 2017	Jan 31, 2017	Unreleased	No	
Gem Legends	Puzzle	Big Fish Games	Big Fish Games	Sep 29, 2015	Sep 11, 2015	Unreleased	No	
Gem Smashers	Puzzle	Raylight Games	Funbox Media	Mar 7, 2017	Feb 24, 2017	Unreleased	No	
Gendai Daisenryaku 2016: Chitsujo no Hōkai Haken Kokka Shittsui	Turn-based strategy	SystemSoft Alpha	SystemSoft Alpha	Unreleased	Unreleased	Apr 28, 2016	Yes	
Genimus	Action	Planet G	Planet G	Unreleased	Unreleased	Oct 31, 2013	No	
Genji Koi Emaki	Otome game	QuinRose	QuinRose	Unreleased	Unreleased	Sep 17, 2015	Yes	
Genkai Tokki: Moero Chronicle	Dungeon crawler	Compile Heart	Compile Heart	Unreleased	Unreleased	May 15, 2014	No	
Genkai Tokki: Moero Crystal	Dungeon crawler	Compile Heart	Compile Heart	Unreleased	Unreleased	Sep 25, 2015	No	
Genkai Tokki: Seven Pirates	Dungeon crawler	Compile Heart	Compile Heart	Unreleased	Unreleased	Aug 4, 2016	No	
Gensō Rōgoku no Kaleidoscope	Visual novel	Ryukishi07	Entergram	Unreleased	Unreleased	Dec 17, 2020	No	
Geometry Wars 3: Dimensions Evolved	Shooter	Lucid Games	Sierra Entertainment	Jul 7, 2015	Jul 8, 2015	Unreleased	Yes	
Germinator	Puzzle	Creat Studios	Creat Studios	Mar 5, 2013	Mar 6, 2013	Unreleased	Yes	
Geten no Hana with Yume Akari Aizō-ban	Otome game	Ruby Party	Koei Tecmo	Unreleased	Unreleased	Sep 8, 2016	Yes	
Get off my Lawn!	Action	Digital Leisure	Sony Computer Entertainment	Nov 11, 2014	Nov 12, 2014	Unreleased	No	
Getsuei Gakuen: Kou	Visual novel	Arc System Works	Arc System Works	Unreleased	Unreleased	Oct 10, 2013	Yes	
Getsuei no Kusari: Kyouran Moratorium	Otome game	Takuyo	Takuyo	Unreleased	Unreleased	Dec 21, 2016	Yes	
Getsuei no Kusari: Sakuran Paranoia	Otome game	Takuyo	Takuyo	Unreleased	Unreleased	Dec 23, 2015	Yes	
Ghoulboy	Action	Serkan Bakar	Hidden Trap	Mar 5, 2019	Sep 25, 2019	Unreleased	Yes	
Ginsei Igo: Next Generation	Go	Silver Star	Silver Star	Unreleased	Unreleased	Nov 27, 2014	Yes	
Ginsei Shogi: Kyōtendo Toufū Raijin	Shougi	Silver Star	Silver Star	Unreleased	Unreleased	Aug 9, 2012	Yes	
Gintama Ranbu	Action	Bandai Namco Entertainment	Bandai Namco Entertainment	Unreleased	Unreleased	Jan 18, 2018	No	
Girl Friend (Kari): Kimi to Sugosu Natsuyasumi	Visual novel; Dating sim	CyberAgent	Bandai Namco Entertainment	Unreleased	Unreleased	Nov 19, 2015	No	
Girls und Panzer: Senshadō, Kiwamemasu!	Shooter	Namco Bandai Games	Namco Bandai Games	Unreleased	Unreleased	Jun 26, 2014	Yes	
Gnosia	Visual novel	Mebius	Mebius	Unreleased	Unreleased	Jun 20, 2019	No	
Gochūmon wa Usagi Desu ka?? Wonderful Party!	Visual novel; Mini-games	5pb.	5pb.	Unreleased	Unreleased	Mar 3, 2016	Yes	
God Eater 2	Action role-playing	Shift	Bandai Namco Games	Unreleased	Unreleased	Nov 14, 2013	Yes	
God Eater 2: Rage Burst (Note: Update for God Eater 2.)	Action role-playing	Shift	Bandai Namco Games	Aug 30, 2016	Aug 30, 2016	Feb 19, 2015	Yes	
God Eater Off Shot: Alisa-hen	Photo shooting	Bandai Namco Games	Bandai Namco Games	Unreleased	Unreleased	Dec 23, 2015	Yes	
God Eater Off Shot: Kōta-hen	Photo shooting	Bandai Namco Games	Bandai Namco Games	Unreleased	Unreleased	Mar 24, 2016	Yes	
God Eater Off Shot: Lindow-hen	Photo shooting	Bandai Namco Games	Bandai Namco Games	Unreleased	Unreleased	Nov 26, 2015	Yes	
God Eater Off Shot: Sakuya-hen	Photo shooting	Bandai Namco Games	Bandai Namco Games	Unreleased	Unreleased	Apr 21, 2016	Yes	
God Eater Off Shot: Shio-hen	Photo shooting	Bandai Namco Games	Bandai Namco Games	Unreleased	Unreleased	Feb 25, 2016	Yes	
God Eater Off Shot: Sōma-hen	Photo shooting	Bandai Namco Games	Bandai Namco Games	Unreleased	Unreleased	Jan 28, 2016	Yes	
God Eater Resurrection	Action role-playing	Shift	Bandai Namco Entertainment	Jun 28, 2016	Aug 30, 2016	Oct 29, 2015	Yes	
God of War Collection	Action	Santa Monica Studio, Sanzaru Games	Sony Computer Entertainment	May 6, 2014	May 9, 2014	May 15, 2014	Yes	
God Wars: Future Past	Tactical role-playing	Kadokawa Games	Kadokawa Games	Jun 20, 2017	Jun 16, 2017	Jun 22, 2017	Yes	
God Wars: Nihon Shinwa Taisen (Note: Update for God Wars: Future Past.)	Turn-based strategy	Kadokawa	Kadokawa	Unreleased	Unreleased	Jun 14, 2018	No	
Gods of Almagest	Puzzle	Arrayansoft	Arrayansoft	Feb 25, 2021	Unreleased	Unreleased	No	
Goes!	Otome game	Petit Reve	Future Tech Lab	Unreleased	Unreleased	Nov 26, 2015	Yes	
Goetia: Sen no Majin to Mugen no Tō	Role-playing	Appirits	Appirits	Unreleased	Unreleased	Aug 18, 2017	Yes	
Golden Time: Vivid Memories	Visual novel	Cattle Call	Kadokawa Games	Unreleased	Unreleased	Mar 27, 2014	No	
Grand Kingdom	Tactical role-playing	Monochrome Corporation	Spike Chunsoft (JP); NIS America (NA/EU)	Jun 21, 2016	Jun 17, 2016	Nov 19, 2015	Yes	
Grand Theft Auto: iFruit	Application	Rockstar Games	Rockstar Games	Unreleased	Unreleased	Sep 16, 2013	No	
Grass Cutter: Mutated Lawns	Action	Sometimes You	Sometimes You	Jul 10, 2019	Jul 10, 2019	Unreleased	No	
Gravity Badgers	Action	Wales Interactive	Wales Interactive	Aug 19, 2014	Aug 20, 2014	Unreleased	No	
Gravity Crash Ultra	Shoot 'em up	Just Add Water	Sony Computer Entertainment	Aug 12, 2014	Aug 13, 2014	Unreleased	Yes	
Gravity Duck	Platform	Ratalaika Games	Ravenous Games	Aug 13, 2019	Aug 14, 2019	Unreleased	No	
Gravity Rush	Action-adventure	Japan Studio, Project Siren	Sony Computer Entertainment	Jun 12, 2012	Jun 13, 2012	Feb 9, 2012	No	
Green Game: TimeSwapper	Platform	iFun4All	iFun4All	Apr 5, 2016	Apr 5, 2016	Unreleased	No	
Grim Fandango Remastered	Adventure	LucasArts, Double Fine Productions	Sony Computer Entertainment	Jan 27, 2015	Jan 28, 2015	Unreleased	Yes	
Guard Duty	Adventure	Ratalaika Games	Sick Chicken Studios	Apr 21, 2020	Unreleased	Unreleased	No	
Grisaia no Kajitsu: Le Fruit De La Grisaia	Visual novel	Front Wing	Prototype	Unreleased	Unreleased	Aug 8, 2013	Yes	
Grisaia no Kajitsu: Side Episode	Visual novel	Front Wing	Prototype	Unreleased	Unreleased	Jul 27, 2017	Yes	
Grisaia no Meikyuu: Le Labyrinthe De La Grisaia	Visual novel	Front Wing	Prototype	Unreleased	Unreleased	Oct 30, 2014	Yes	
Grisaia no Rakuen: Le Eden De La Grisaia	Visual novel	Front Wing	Prototype	Unreleased	Unreleased	Dec 11, 2014	Yes	
Grisaia no Kajitsu Spin-out!? Idol Magical Girl Chiruchiru Michiru	Visual novel	Front Wing	Prototype	Unreleased	Unreleased	Jun 25, 2015	Yes	
Grisaia: Phantom Trigger Vol. 1 & 2	Visual novel	Front Wing	Prototype	Unreleased	Unreleased	Dec 21, 2017	Yes	
Grisaia: Phantom Trigger Vol. 3 & 4	Visual novel	Front Wing	Prototype	Unreleased	Unreleased	Aug 2, 2018	Yes	
Guacamelee!	Platform	DrinkBox Studios	DrinkBox Studios (NA/EU); Spike Chunsoft (JP)	Apr 9, 2013	Apr 10, 2013	Mar 27, 2014	Yes (1-2 players)	
Guardian Hearts Online	Role-playing	Q Entertainment	Q Entertainment	Unreleased	Unreleased	Aug 9, 2012	No	
Guilty Gear XX Accent Core Plus R	Fighting	Arc System Works	Arc System Works (JP/NA); PQube (EU)	Apr 23, 2013	Jun 25, 2015	Mar 19, 2013	Yes	
Gundam Breaker	Action	Craft & Meisters	Bandai Namco Games	Unreleased	Unreleased	Oct 31, 2013	Yes	
Gundam Breaker 2	Action	Craft & Meisters	Bandai Namco Games	Unreleased	Unreleased	Dec 18, 2014	Yes	
Gundam Breaker 3	Action	Craft & Meisters	Bandai Namco Games	Unreleased	Unreleased	Mar 3, 2016	Yes	
Gundemoniums	Shoot 'em up	Platine Dispositif	Mediascape	Unreleased	Unreleased	Feb 1, 2018	No	
Gun Gun Pixies	Third-person shooter	Shade	Compile Heart	Unreleased	Unreleased	Apr 27, 2017	Yes	
Gunhouse	Tower defense	Necrosoft Games	Necrosoft Games	Dec 19, 2017	Aug 22, 2018	Unreleased	No	
Gunka o Haita Neko	Visual novel	Primula	Prototype	Unreleased	Unreleased	Sep 12, 2019	No	
Gunslugs	Shooter	OrangePixel, Abstraction Games	Abstraction Games	Feb 18, 2014	Feb 19, 2014	Unreleased	Yes	
Habroxia	Shooter	Lillymo Games	Lillymo Games	Sep 19, 2019	Sep 19, 2019	Unreleased	Yes	
Habroxia 2	Shooter	Lillymo Games	Lillymo Games	Feb 3, 2021	Feb 3, 2021	Unreleased	Yes	
Haiyore! Nyaruko-san: Meijo Shigatai Game no You na Mono	Visual novel	5pb.	5pb.	Unreleased	Unreleased	May 30, 2013	Yes	
Hakuōki: Edo Blossoms (Note: Update for Hakuōki: Kyōkaroku. An expanded remake covering the second half of the original story.)	Otome game	Otomate, Design Factory	Idea Factory	Mar 13, 2018	Mar 16, 2018	Jun 16, 2016	Yes	
Hakuōki: Kyōkaroku	Otome game	Otomate, Design Factory	Idea Factory	Unreleased	Unreleased	Dec 19, 2013	Yes	
Hakuōki: Kyoto Winds (Note: Update for Hakuōki: Kyōkaroku. An expanded remake covering the first half of the original story.)	Otome game	Otomate, Design Factory	Idea Factory	May 16, 2017	May 19, 2017	Sep 25, 2015	Yes	
Hakuōki: Reimeiroku Omōhase Sora	Otome game	Otomate, Design Factory	Idea Factory	Unreleased	Unreleased	Jul 2, 2015	Yes	
Hakuōki SSL: Sweet School Life	Otome game	Otomate, Design Factory	Idea Factory	Unreleased	Unreleased	Mar 27, 2014	Yes	
Hakuōki: Yuugiroku Taishi-tachi no Daienka	Otome game; Mini-games	Otomate, Design Factory	Idea Factory	Unreleased	Unreleased	Nov 17, 2016	Yes	
Hakuōki: Zuisouroku Omokage-ge Hana	Otome game	Otomate, Design Factory	Idea Factory	Unreleased	Unreleased	Feb 19, 2015	Yes	
Halloween Forever	Platform	Imaginary Monsters	Poppy Works	Oct 22, 2018	Jun 27, 2019	Unreleased	No	
Hana Oboro: Sengoku-den Ranki	Otome game; Mini-games	Otomate	Idea Factory	Unreleased	Unreleased	Jan 19, 2016	Yes	
Hanasaki Work Spring!	Visual novel	Saga Planets	Entergram	Unreleased	Unreleased	Apr 27, 2017	Yes	
Hanasaku Manimani	Visual novel; Dating sim	5pb.	5pb.	Unreleased	Unreleased	Sep 25, 2014	Yes	
Hanayaka Nari, Waga Ichizoku Gentō Nostalgie	Otome game	Ichi Column, Otomate	Idea Factory	Unreleased	Unreleased	May 28, 2015	Yes	
Hanayaka Nari, Waga Ichizoku Modern Nostalgie	Otome game	Ichi Column, Otomate	Idea Factory	Unreleased	Unreleased	Apr 30, 2015	Yes	
Hanayamata: Yosakoi Live!	Rhythm	Bandai Namco Games	Bandai Namco Games	Unreleased	Unreleased	Nov 13, 2014	Yes	
Handball 16	Sports	Eko Software	Bigben Interactive	Nov 30, 2015	Nov 27, 2015	Unreleased	No	
Harukanaru Toki no Naka de Ultimate	Otome game; Role-playing	Ruby Party	Koei Tecmo	Unreleased	Unreleased	Feb 22, 2018	Yes	
Harukanaru Toki no Naka de 3 Ultimate	Otome game; Role-playing	Ruby Party	Koei Tecmo	Unreleased	Unreleased	Feb 23, 2017	Yes	
Harukanaru Toki no Naka de 6	Otome game; Role-playing	Ruby Party	Koei Tecmo	Unreleased	Unreleased	Mar 12, 2015	Yes	
Harukanaru Toki no Naka de 6: Gentō Rondo	Otome game; Role-playing	Ruby Party	Koei Tecmo	Unreleased	Unreleased	Dec 22, 2016	Yes	
Haruoto Alice * Gram: Snow Drop	Visual novel	NanaWind	NanaWind	Unreleased	Unreleased	Jun 30, 2017	No	
Hatsujou Sprinkle	Visual novel	Whirlpool	Whirlpool	Unreleased	Unreleased	Jul 28, 2017	No	
Harvest Overray	Visual novel	Giga	Entergram	Unreleased	Unreleased	Jun 25, 2015	Yes	
Hatoful Boyfriend	Dating sim	Hato-King, Mediatonic	Devolver Digital	Jul 21, 2015	Jul 21, 2015	Mar 24, 2016	Yes	
Hatoful Boyfriend: Holiday Star	Dating sim	Hato-King, Mediatonic	Devolver Digital	Dec 22, 2015	Dec 22, 2015	Mar 24, 2016	No	
Hatsune Miku: Project Diva F	Rhythm	Sega, Crypton Future Media	Sega	Mar 4, 2014	Mar 12, 2014	Aug 30, 2012	Japan/Asia only (Requires DualShock 4 controller)	
Hatsune Miku: Project Diva F 2nd	Rhythm	Sega, Crypton Future Media	Sega	Nov 18, 2014	Nov 21, 2014	Mar 27, 2014	Yes	
Hatsune Miku: Project Diva X	Rhythm	Sega, Crypton Future Media	Sega	Aug 30, 2016	Aug 30, 2016	Mar 24, 2016	Yes	
Hatsuru Koto Naki Mirai Yori	Visual novel	Front Wing	Prototype	Unreleased	Unreleased	Dec 22, 2016	Yes	
Hatsuyuki Sakura	Visual novel	Saga Planets	Entergram	Unreleased	Unreleased	Mar 23, 2017	Yes	
The HD Adventures of Rotating Octopus Character	Action	Dakko Dakko	Dakko Dakko	Aug 27, 2013	May 29, 2013	Unreleased	Yes	
Heiligenstadt no Uta	Otome game	Extend	Extend	Unreleased	Unreleased	Sep 28, 2017	Yes	
Helldivers	Shooter	Arrowhead Game Studios	Sony Computer Entertainment	Mar 3, 2015	Mar 4, 2015	Mar 5, 2015	Yes	
Hello Kitty to Issho: Block Crash V	Puzzle	Dorasu	Dorasu	Unreleased	Unreleased	Jun 7, 2012	No	
Hello Lady! Superior Dynamis	Visual novel	Akatsuki Works	Dramatic Create	Unreleased	Unreleased	Jan 25, 2018	Yes	
Heroes of Loot	Action	OrangePixel, Abstraction Games	Abstraction Games	Sep 22, 2015	Sep 22, 2015	Unreleased	Yes	
Hero Must Die	Role-playing	Nippon Ichi Software	Nippon Ichi Software	Unreleased	Unreleased	Feb 15, 2016	Yes	
Heroes Trials	Action role-playing	Shinyuden	Ratalaika Games	Jan 22, 2019	Jan 23, 2019	Unreleased	Yes	
Hideboh: Tap Dance Hero	Rhythm	Dorasu	Dorasu	Unreleased	Unreleased	Oct 9, 2014	No	
High School DxD: New Fight	Role-playing	Marvelous	Marvelous	Unreleased	Unreleased	Aug 28, 2014	No	
Higurashi When They Cry Sui	Visual novel	07th Expansion, Alchemist	Kaga Create	Unreleased	Unreleased	Mar 12, 2015	Yes	
Hiiro no Kakera: Omoi Iro no Kioku	Otome game	Otomate	Idea Factory	Unreleased	Unreleased	Jul 27, 2017	Yes	
Himawari: Pebble in the Sky	Visual novel	Blank Note, Front Wing	Prototype	Unreleased	Unreleased	Aug 27, 2015	Yes	
Himehibi: Princess Days	Otome game; Mini-game	Takuyo	Takuyo	Unreleased	Unreleased	Jul 20, 2017	Yes	
Himehibi Zoku! Nigakki: New Princess Days	Otome game	Takuyo	Takuyo	Unreleased	Unreleased	Dec 14, 2017	Yes	
Himouto! Umaru-chan: Himouto! Ikusei Keikaku	Raising simulation	FuRyu	FuRyu	Unreleased	Unreleased	Dec 3, 2015	Yes	
Hinemosu Shikihime	Action	Appirits	Appirits	Unreleased	Unreleased	Sep 25, 2018	No	
Hitman Go: Definitive Edition	Puzzle	Square Enix Montreal	Square Enix	Feb 23, 2016	Feb 23, 2016	Unreleased	Yes	
Himno	Platform	Ratalaika Games	Ratalaika Games	Sep 11, 2019	Sep 11, 2019	Unreleased	Yes	
Hitotsu Tobashi Ren'ai V	Visual novel	ASa Project	Kaga Create	Unreleased	Unreleased	Jan 29, 2015	Yes	
Hoggy 2	Action	Raptisoft	Ratalaika Games	Jul 23, 2019	Jul 24, 2019	Unreleased	No	
Hohokum	Action	Honeyslug, Santa Monica Studio	Sony Computer Entertainment	Aug 12, 2014	Aug 13, 2014	Aug 13, 2014	Yes	
Home	Adventure	Benjamin Rivers Inc.	Benjamin Rivers Inc.	Nov 4, 2014	Apr 15, 2015	Unreleased	Yes	
Horizon Chase Turbo	Racing	Aquiris Game Studio	EastAsiaSoft	Jun 18, 2020	Jun 18, 2020	Jun 18, 2020	No	
Hoshi Ori Yume Mirai Converted Edition	Otome game	Tone Work's	Prototype	Unreleased	Unreleased	Aug 10, 2016	Yes	
Hot Shots Golf: World Invitational •Everybody's Golf 6^{JP}	Sports	Clap Hanz	Sony Computer Entertainment	Feb 15, 2012	Feb 22, 2012	Dec 17, 2011	No	
Hotaru no Nikki	Adventure	Nippon Ichi Software	Nippon Ichi Software	Feb 24, 2015	Mar 4, 2015	Jun 19, 2014	Yes	
Hotchkiss	Visual novel	Giga, Daidai Inc.	Entergram	Unreleased	Unreleased	Aug 29, 2013	Yes	
Hotline Miami	Shooter	Dennaton Games, Abstraction Games	Devolver Digital (NA/EU); Spike Chunsoft (JP)	Jun 25, 2013	Jun 26, 2013	Jun 12, 2015 (Note: Bundled together and released as Hotline Miami: Collected Edition in Japan.)	Yes	
Hotline Miami 2: Wrong Number	Shooter	Dennaton Games, Abstraction Games	Devolver Digital (NA/EU); Spike Chunsoft (JP)	Mar 10, 2015	Mar 11, 2015	Jun 12, 2015	Yes	
HTR+ Slot Car Simulation	Racing	QUByte Game Studio	Caipirinha Games	Nov 17, 2015	Apr 27, 2016	Unreleased	No	
Hue	Platform	Fiddlesticks Games	Curve Digital	Nov 29, 2016	Nov 29, 2016	Unreleased	No	
Hungry Giraffe	Action	Laughing Jackal	Laughing Jackal	Unreleased	Mar 6, 2013	Unreleased	No	
The Hungry Horde	Action	Nosebleed Interactive	Sony Computer Entertainment	Nov 4, 2014	Nov 5, 2014	Unreleased	Yes	
Hustle Kings	Sports	VooFoo Studios, EPOS Game Studios	Sony Computer Entertainment	Feb 15, 2012	Feb 22, 2012	Unreleased	No	
Hyakka Hyakurō: Sengoku Ninpōchō	Otome game	Red Entertainment	D3 Publisher	Unreleased	Unreleased	Feb 25, 2016	Yes	
Hyakka Ryōran Elixir: Record of Torenia Revival	Visual novel	AXL	Kaga Create	Unreleased	Unreleased	Apr 9, 2015	Yes	
Hyakka Yakō	Otome game	Otomate	Idea Factory	Unreleased	Unreleased	Feb 12, 2015	Yes	
Hyperdevotion Noire: Goddess Black Heart	Tactical role-playing	Compile Heart, Sting Entertainment	Compile Heart	Feb 24, 2015	Feb 27, 2015	May 29, 2014	Yes	
Hyperdimension Neptunia: Producing Perfection	Raising simulation, rhythm	Compile Heart, Tamsoft	Compile Heart	Jun 3, 2014	Jun 6, 2014	Jun 20, 2013	Japan/Asia only	
Hyperdimension Neptunia Re;Birth 1	Role-playing	Compile Heart, Felistella	Compile Heart	Aug 26, 2014	Aug 27, 2014	Oct 31, 2013	Japan/Asia only	
Hyperdimension Neptunia Re;Birth 2: Sisters Generation	Role-playing	Compile Heart, Felistella	Compile Heart	Jan 27, 2015	Feb 6, 2015	Mar 20, 2014	Yes	
Hyperdimension Neptunia Re;Birth 3: V Generation	Role-playing	Compile Heart	Compile Heart	Jun 30, 2015	Jun 26, 2015	Dec 18, 2014	Yes	
Hyperdimension Neptunia U: Action Unleashed	Action	Tamsoft	Compile Heart (JP); Idea Factory International (NA/EU)	May 19, 2015	May 22, 2015	Aug 28, 2014	Yes	

== See also ==
- List of PlayStation Vita games (A–D)
- List of PlayStation Vita games (I–L)
- List of PlayStation Vita games (M–O)
- List of PlayStation Vita games (P–R)
- List of PlayStation Vita games (S)
- List of PlayStation Vita games (T–V)
- List of PlayStation Vita games (W–Z)
