= List of role-playing video games: 2026 to 2027 =

All RPGs from 2026-2027

This is a comprehensive index of commercial role-playing video games (RPGs), sorted chronologically by year. Information regarding release platform, release type, RPG subgenre, game setting, developers, publishers, and country of origin is provided where available. The table can be sorted by clicking on the small boxes next to the column headings.

This list includes all RPG subgenres, including MMORPGs, Action RPGs and Tactical RPGs. This list does not include MUDs and Roguelikes by default, unless they have an additional RPG subgenre. For standalone lists on these subgenres, see List of MUDs and List of roguelikes

== Legend ==
Video game platforms
DROID	Android	iOS	iOS, iPhone, iPod, iPadOS, iPad, visionOS, Apple Vision Pro	LIN	Linux
NS	Nintendo Switch	NS2	Nintendo Switch 2	OSX	macOS
PS4	PlayStation 4	PS5	PlayStation 5	WIN	Windows, all versions Windows 95 and up
XBO	Xbox One	XBX/S	Xbox Series X/S		

Types of releases
Compilation	A compilation, anthology or collection of several titles, usually (but not always) belonging to the same series
Early access	A game launched in early access is unfinished and thus might contain bugs and glitches or have some of the content missing
Episodic	An episodic video game that is released in batches over a period of time
Expansion	A large-scale DLC to an already existing game that adds new story, areas and additions and/or changes to the game's mechanics
Full release	A full release of a game that launched in early access first
Limited	A special release (often called "Limited" or "Collector's Edition") with bonus collector's material. Often provided to people who pre-order a game
Port	The game first appeared on a different platform and a port was made. The game is like the original, with few or no differences
Remake	The game is an enhanced remake of an original, made using a new engine and/or assets and thus containing completely new sound, graphics and possibly changes to the story and/or gameplay
Remaster	The game is a remaster of an original, released on the same or different platform, with (usually minor) changes to graphics, sound and/or gameplay
Rerelease	The game was re-released on the same platform with no or only minor changes

Video game genres
Action RPG	Action role-playing game	Dungeon crawl	Dungeon crawl	JRPG	Japanese-style role-playing game
MMORPG	Massively multiplayer online RPG	Monster tamer	Monster-taming game	MUD	Multi-user dungeon
Real-time	Real-time game	Roguelike	Roguelike, Roguelite	Sandbox	Sandbox game
Soulslike	Soulslike	Tactical RPG	Tactical role-playing game	Turn-based	Turn-based game

== List ==
Year	Title	Platform	Type	RPG Subgenre	Setting	Developer	Publisher	COO	Ref.
2026 (WW)	Ariana and the Elder Codex	NS, PS4, PS5		Action RPG		HYDE	Idea Factory International		
2026	Arknights: Endfield	WIN, PS5, iOS, DROID	Original	Action RPG		Mountain Contour	Gryphline		
2026	Avowed	PS5	Port	Action RPG		Obsidian Entertainment	Xbox Game Studios		
2026	Back to the Dawn	NS, NS2				Metal Head Games	Clouded Leopard Entertainment, Spiral Up Games		
2026	Ball x Pit	iOS, DROID	Port	Roguelike		Kenny Sun	Devolver Digital		
2026	Banquet for Fools	WIN, OSX	Full release			Hannah and Joseph Games			
2026	BlazBlue Entropy Effect X	NS, PS5, XBX/S	Port	Roguelike		91Act	Astrolabe Games		
2026	Bravely Default: Flying Fairy HD Remaster	WIN, XBX/S	Port			Cattle Call	Square Enix		
2026 (WW)	Calamity Angels: Special Delivery	NS, PS4, PS5				Compile Heart	Idea Factory International		
2026	Card-en-Ciel	NS2				Inti Creates			
2026	Cassette Boy	WIN, OSX, NS, PS4, PS5, XBO, XBX/S		Action RPG		Wonderland Kazakiri	Pocketpair Publishing		
2026	Caves of Qud	NS	Port	Roguelike		Freehold Games	Kitfox Games		
2026	Chrono Ark Deluxe Edition	NS				Al Fine	Playism		
2026	Code Vein II	WIN, PS5, XBX/S	Original	Action RPG		Bandai Namco Studios	Bandai Namco Entertainment		
2026	Cult of the Lamb: Woolhaven	WIN, OSX, NS, PS4, PS5, XBO, XBX/S, iOS	Expansion	Roguelike		Massive Monster	Devolver Digital		
2026 (JP)	Curse Warrior	NS, PS4, PS5		Dungeon crawl		GuruGuru	Nippon Ichi Software		
2026	Death Howl	NS, PS5, XBX/S		Soulslike		The Outer Zone	11 Bit Studios		
2026	Disciples: Domination	WIN, PS5, XBX/S		Tactical RPG		Artefacts Studio	Kalypso Media		
2026 (JP)	Disgaea Mayhem (Note: Released as Kyouran Makaism in Japan.)	NS, NS2, PS5	Original	Action RPG		Nippon Ichi Software			
2026 (JP)	Dokapon 3-2-1 Super Collection! (Note: Includes Dokapon 3-2-1: Arashi wo Yobu Yuujou, Kessen! Dokapon Oudoku IV: Densetsu no Yusha Tachi, and Dokapon Gaiden: Honoo no Audition.)	NS	Compilation			Sting Entertainment			
2026	Dragon Quest VII Reimagined	WIN, NS, NS2, PS5, XBX/S	Remake			Square Enix			
2026	Dragonkin: The Banished	WIN, PS5, XBX/S	Full release	Action RPG		Eko Software	Nacon		
2026	Dread Delusion	NS2, PS4, PS5, XBO, XBX/S	Port			Lovely Hellplace	DreadXP		
2026	Eldegarde	WIN	Full release	Action RPG		Notorious Studios			
2026	Escape from Ever After	WIN, NS, PS4, PS5, XBO, XBX/S				Sleepy Castle Studio	HypeTrain Digital		
2026	Esoteric Ebb	WIN	Original			Christoffer Bodegård	Raw Fury		
2026	Fallout 4: Anniversary Edition	NS2	Port	Action RPG		Bethesda Game Studios	Bethesda Softworks		
2026	Final Fantasy VII Remake Intergrade	NS2, XBX/S	Port	Action RPG		Square Enix			
2026	Fire Emblem: Path of Radiance	NS2	Port	Tactical RPG		Intelligent Systems, Nintendo SPD	Nintendo		
2026	Front Mission 3 Remake	WIN, PS4, PS5, XBO, XBX/S	Port	Tactical RPG		MegaPixel Studio	Forever Entertainment		
2026	Gnosia	iOS, DROID	Port			Petit Depotto	Playism		
2026 (JP)	goHELLgo Gou: Tsukiotoshitego	WIN, NS, PS4				Entergram			
2026	GreedFall 2: The Dying World	WIN, PS5, XBX/S	Full release	Action RPG		Spiders	Nacon		
2026	Hermit and Pig	WIN				Heavy Lunch Studio			
2026	Hunter × Hunter: Nen × Survivor	iOS, DROID		Roguelike		WonderPlanet	Bushimo		
2026	Kingdom Come: Deliverance	PS5, XBX/S	Port	Action RPG		Warhorse Studios	Deep Silver		
2026 (WW)	The Legend of Heroes: Trails Beyond the Horizon	WIN, NS, NS2, PS4, PS5				Nihon Falcom	NIS America		
2026	Mado Monogatari: Fia and the Wondrous Academy	WIN	Port	Dungeon crawl		Sting Entertainment, D4 Enterprise	Idea Factory International		
2026	Mega Man Star Force Legacy Collection	WIN, NS, PS4, PS5, XBO, XBX/S	Compilation	Action RPG		Capcom			
2026	Mewgenics	WIN	Original	Tactical RPG, Roguelike		Edmund McMillen, Tyler Glaiel			
2026	Monster Hunter Stories 3: Twisted Reflection	WIN, NS2, PS5, XBX/S	Original			Capcom			
2026	Never Grave: The Witch and The Curse	WIN, NS, PS4, PS5, XBX/S	Original	Roguelike		Frontside 180 Studio	Pocketpair Publishing		
2026	Nioh 3	WIN, PS5	Original	Action RPG		Team Ninja	Koei Tecmo		
2026	Oceanhorn 3: Legend of the Shadow Sea	OSX, iOS	Original			Cornfox & Bros.			
2026	Pokémon FireRed and LeafGreen	NS	Port	Monster tamer		Game Freak	JP: The Pokémon Company; WW: Nintendo		
2026 (JP)	R-Type Tactics I • II Cosmos	WIN, NS, NS2, PS4, PS5, XBX/S	Remake, Compilation	Tactical RPG		Granzella Game Studios	Granzella		
2026	Rotwood	WIN, NS2	Full release	Roguelike		Klei Entertainment			
2026	Rune Factory: Guardians of Azuma	PS5, XBX/S		Action RPG		Marvelous			
2026	The Seven Deadly Sins: Origin	WIN, PS5, iOS, DROID	Original	Action RPG		Netmarble F&C	Netmarble		
2026	Shiren the Wanderer: The Mystery Dungeon of Serpentcoil Island	iOS, DROID		Roguelike		Spike Chunsoft			
2026	Star Trek: Voyager – Across the Unknown	WIN, NS2, PS5, XBX/S	Original	Roguelike		Gamexcite	Daedalic Entertainment		
2026	Steel Century Groove	WIN				Sloth Gloss Games			
2026	Tales of Berseria Remastered	WIN, NS, PS5, XBX/S	Remaster	Action RPG		Bandai Namco Studios	Bandai Namco Entertainment		
2026	Towerborne	WIN, PS5, XBX/S	Full release	Action RPG		Stoic	Xbox Game Studios		
2026	Under the Island	WIN, NS, PS4, PS5, XBO, XBX/S		Action RPG		Slime King Games	Top Hat Studios		
2026 (WW)	Utawarerumono: Zan 2	WIN	Port	Action RPG		Aquaplus	Shiravune, DMM Games		
2026 (WW)	WiZmans World Re;Try	WIN, NS, PS4, PS5				Lancarse, City Connection	Clear River Games		
2026	World of Warcraft: Midnight	WIN, OSX	Expansion	MMORPG		Blizzard Entertainment			
2026	Xenoblade Chronicles X: Definitive Edition	NS2	Port	Action RPG		Monolith Soft	Nintendo		
2026 (WW)	Ys X: Proud Nordics	WIN, NS2, PS5		Action RPG		Nihon Falcom	WW: NIS America; JP: Nihon Falcom		
