= Rumi Okubo =

Japanese voice actress (born 1989)

- 大久保 瑠美
- Born: September 27, 1989 (age 37); Ehime Prefecture, Japan
- Occupation: Voice actress
- Years active: 2009–present
- Agent: 81 Produce
- Height: 150 cm (59 in)

Rumi Okubo (大久保 瑠美, Ōkubo Rumi; born September 27, 1989) is a Japanese voice actress associated with 81 Produce. She voiced Ako Shirabe/Cure Muse in Suite PreCure and Mia Ageha in Pretty Rhythm: Dear My Future. She won an award for Best Female Newcomer at the 7th Seiyu Awards.

== Filmography ==
=== Anime ===
List of voice performances in anime
Year	Title	Role	Notes	Source
2009	Whispered Words	Konomi		
2009	Fairy Tail	Gogotora		
2010	Katanagatari	Daughter		
2010	Lilpri	Azumi, Nakaya あづみ/中谷		
2011	Magical Girl Madoka Magica	Schoolgirl, Nurse B		
2011	Freezing	Kaho Hiiragi		
2011	I Don't Like You at All, Big Brother!!	Maid	Ep. 7	
2011–14	Cardfight!! Vanguard series	Various characters (Shining Lady, Girl, Knight of the Rose Morganana, Karma Queen, Goddess of the Full Moon, Tsukuyomi, High Dog Breeder, Akane)		
2011	Suite PreCure	Ako Shirabe		
2011	Happy Kappy	Suguri Kinoshita		
2011–19	YuruYuri series	Chinatsu Yoshikawa		
2012	Symphogear	Various characters		
2012	Place to Place	Tsumiki Miniwa		
2012	Sengoku Collection	Oda Nobunaga		
2012–13	Pretty Rhythm: Dear My Future	Mia Ageha		
2012	The Ambition of Oda Nobuna	Bontenmaru		
2012–13	Magi: The Labyrinth of Magic series	Pisti	Also Kingdom in 2013	
2012	Medaka Box Abnormal	Genji Temple		
2012	Arata-naru Sekai	Hongo	OVA	
2013	Maoyu	Ming star loudspeaker		
2013	Straight Title Robot Anime	Mori		
2013	Muromi-san	Ciel		
2013	Mushibugyo	Hibachi		
2013	Yuyushiki	Yuzuko Nonohara		
2013	Servant × Service	Tōko Ichimiya		
2013	Gingitsune	Fujino Tenbumo		
2013	Galilei Donna	Kazuki Ferrari		
2014	Wizard Barristers	Koromo Sasori		
2014	Blade & Soul	Peer ピア		
2014	Pretty Rhythm: All-Star Selection	Mia Ageha		
2014	One Week Friends	Saki Yamagishi		
2014	Black Bullet	Yuzuki Katagiri		
2014	Kagerou Project	Director of art department		
2014	Barakamon	Tamako Arai		
2014–18	PriPara series	Iroha Kagawa, Mia Hanazono		
2014	Sabagebu!	Urara Kasugano		
2014	Momo Kyun Sword	Maron		
2014	Calimero	Priscilla		
2014	Nano Invaders	Alice (7035)		
2015	Death Parade	Nona		
2015	Tesagure! Bukatsu-mono	Kanon Izayoi		
2015	Mikagura School Suite	Azumi Sagara		
2015	Urawa no Usagi-chan	Saiko Numakage		
2015	Anti-Magic Academy: The 35th Test Platoon	Usagi Saionji		
2015	Valkyrie Drive Mermaid	Miranda		
2015	Tokyo Ghoul:Jack	Aki Sasada		
2016	Gate	Shandy Graff Marea		
2016	Hundred	Emilia Gutenberg/Emile Crossfode		
2016	Joker Game	Emma Grain		
2016	Magi: Adventure of Sinbad	Pisti		
2016	Hybrid × Heart Magias Academy Ataraxia	Grabel		
2016	Tsukiuta. The Animation	Hina Momosaki		
2016	Mob Psycho 100	Ishiguro		
2016	3D Dumi Glass Masque	Aso Himekawa		
2016	Long Riders!	Hinako Saijō		
2017	Spiritpact	Shin Shiyou		
2017–20	Tsugumomo	Kotetsu		
2017	Fate/Apocrypha	Astolfo - Rider of Black		
2017	Gamers!	Aguri		
2018–21	How Not to Summon a Demon Lord	Silvie		
2018–21	That Time I Got Reincarnated as a Slime	Soka		
2019	The Magnificent Kotobuki	Natsuo		
2019	Kandagawa Jet Girls	Pan Ziyu		
2020–23	Sorcerous Stabber Orphen	Cleao Everlasting		
2020	Fruits Basket 2nd Season	Kimi Tōdō		
2020	Talentless Nana	Nana Hiiragi		
2020	Fire Force season 2	Ritsu		
2021	The Hidden Dungeon Only I Can Enter	Lola Metrose		
2021–22	Komi Can't Communicate	Omoharu Nakanaka		
2022	World's End Harem	Chloe Mansfield		
2022	Skeleton Knight in Another World	Eevin		
2022	Musasino!	Saiko Numakage		
2022	Engage Kiss	Sharon Holygrail		
2022	Duel Masters Win	Karen		
2022	I've Somehow Gotten Stronger When I Improved My Farm-Related Skills	Helen Rean		
2022	Beast Tamer	Tania		
2022	Immoral Guild	Enome		
2022	Reincarnated as a Sword	Nell		
2023	Chillin' in My 30s After Getting Fired from the Demon King's Army	Zeviantes		
2023	Edens Zero Season 2	Sylph / Kleene Rutherford		
2023	My Home Hero	Hibiki		
2023	Dead Mount Death Play	Izuna Ajishiro		
2023	Oshi no Ko	Memcho		
2023	Blue Orchestra	Sanae Iida		
2023	Sweet Reincarnation	Josephine Mill Morteln		
2023	My Daughter Left the Nest and Returned an S-Rank Adventurer	Miriam		
2024	My Instant Death Ability Is So Overpowered	Ayaka Shinozaki		
2024	Blue Archive the Animation	Mutsuki Asagi		
2024	Wistoria: Wand and Sword	Iris X. Stella Maris		
2024	No Longer Allowed in Another World	Annette		
2025	Once Upon a Witch's Death	Fine Cavendish		
2025	A Ninja and an Assassin Under One Roof	Yuriko		
2025	Hero Without a Class: Who Even Needs Skills?!	Kufa		
2025	Chitose Is in the Ramune Bottle	Haru Aomi		
2025	Wandance	Anna Itami		
2026	Jack-of-All-Trades, Party of None	Filly Carpenter		
2026	Tune In to the Midnight Heart	Nene Himekawa		
2026	Always a Catch!	Rosalia Pinotti		
2026	Heroine? Saint? No, I'm an All-Works Maid (and Proud of It)!	Luciana Rudleberg		
2026	Magic Knight Rayearth	Umi Ryuuzaki		
2026	Full Clearing Another World Under a Goddess with Zero Believers	Marie		
2026	Yu-Gi-Oh! Card Game The Chronicles	Genni		
2027	The Fledgling Demon Lord's Starter Shop	Mao		

=== Film ===
List of voice performances in film
Year	Title	Role	Notes	Source
2011	Suite PreCure the Movie: Torimodose! Kokoro ga Tsunagu Kiseki no Melody	Ako Shirabe/Cure Muse		
2012	Pretty Cure All Stars New Stage: Friends of the Future	Ako Shirabe/Cure Muse		
2012	Puella Magi Madoka Magica: The Movie	Girl	roles in both films	
2014	Pretty Rhythm All-Star Selection: Prism Show☆Best Ten	Mia Ageha		
2015	PriPara the Movie: Everyone, Assemble! Prism Tours	Mia Ageha		
2018	Hug! Pretty Cure Futari wa Pretty Cure: All Stars Memories	Ako Shirabe/Cure Muse		
2026	Grotesqqque	Papico		

=== Drama CDs ===
List of voice performances in drama CDs
Year	Title	Role	Notes	Source
2011	YuruYuri	Chinatsu Yoshikawa		
2012	Shurabara!	Shepherd		

=== Video games ===
List of voice performances in video games
Year	Title	Role	Notes	Source
2012	Onna-no-ko to Misshitsu ni Itara Shichau kamo shirenai	Kasumi Akiyo	DS	
2012	Cinderella Blade	Maria	PC	
2012	Tokyo Babel	Ghetel	PC	
2012	Girl Friend Beta	Mayori Oyama		
2013	Dungeon Travelers 2	Ist	PSP, also 2014 version	
2013	Princess Arthur	Mary	PSP	
2013	Fate/Extra CCC	Lancer/Elisabeth Bathory	PSP	
2013	0-toki no Kagami to Cinderella: Halloween Wedding	Odette Scarlett	PSP	
2013	Mushibugyo	Hibachi	DS	
2013	Fairy Fencer F	Eryn	PS3	
2014	Cardfight!! Vanguard	Kusakabe Rin 日下部リン	DS	
2014	Lost Dimension	Himeno Akashiki	PS3, other	
2015	Digimon Story: Cyber Sleuth	Female Protagonist		
2015	Tokyo Shin Seiroku: Operation Babel	VIII Hikaru 七世ヒカル	Other	
2015	Ray Gigant	Masanori Inano		
2015	Moero Crystal	Yoko		
2015	Exist Archive: The Other Side of the Sky	Yui Senga		
2015	Miracle Girls Festival	Chinatsu Yoshikawa		
2015	Fate/Grand Order	Astolfo Elisabeth Bathory	Android, iOS	
2016	Cardfight!! Vanguard G game	Ann Kusakabe	DS	
2016	Granblue Fantasy	Lunalu	Android, Chrome Browser, iOS	
2016	Girls' Frontline	M99, Ouroboros	Android, iOS	
2016	Mary Skelter	Little Red Riding Hood		
2016	Fate/Extella: The Umbral Star	Elizabeth Bathory	PS4, PSVita, PC, Switch	
2019	World Flipper	Alice	Android, iOS	
2020	Kandagawa Jet Girls	Pan Ziyu	PS4, PC	
2020	Guardian Tales	Red Hood Executive Arabelle	Android, iOS	
2020	Trials of Mana	Angela	PS4, Switch, PC	
2021	Blue Archive	Mutsuki Asagi	Android, iOS	
2021	Honkai Impact 3rd	Mobius	Android, iOS, PC	
2022	Fairy Fencer F: Refrain Chord	Eryn	PS5, PS4, Switch	
2022	Magia Record	Akari Mai	Android, iOS	
2023	Goddess of Victory: Nikke	Tia	Android, iOS, PC	
2026	Wuthering Waves	Suoming	Android, iOS, PC, PS5	
