= Death End Request =

2019 video game

- Developer: Compile Heart
- Publisher: Idea Factory
- Director: Yohei Sato
- Producer: Norihisa Kochiwa
- Artist: Kei Nanameda
- Composers: Gesshoku Kaigi; Yuki Sugiura
- Platforms: PlayStation 4 Microsoft Windows; Nintendo Switch
- Release: PlayStation 4: JP: April 12, 2018; NA: February 19, 2019; EU: February 22, 2019; Windows: WW: May 16, 2019; Nintendo Switch: JP: December 24, 2020; WW: April 27, 2021
- Genres: Role-playing, visual novel
- Mode: Single-player

Death End Request (stylized Death end re;Quest) is a role-playing video game developed by Compile Heart and published by Idea Factory. It was released for the PlayStation 4 in Japan in April 2018 and worldwide in February 2019, for Windows in May 2019, and for Nintendo Switch in April 2021. A sequel, Death End Request 2, was released in the same regions and platforms across 2021 and 2022.

== Gameplay and premise ==
The game is played from two separate character's perspectives; Arata Mizunashi and Shina Ninomiya. Both characters had previously worked together as video game programmers a year prior for a virtual reality MMORPG called "World's Odyssey", until development was halted due to an unexplained disappearance of Shina. After a year passes, Arata stumbles upon access to the game and is shocked to find that the game's servers are still on, and Shina is trapped within the game with partial amnesia. The two learn that Shina is trapped in the virtual reality game until she finishes the game herself, which is complicated by the fact that the game was unfinished, and has been apparently hacked and altered by a third party as well.

The gameplay is split into two parts. Shina's portions are played as a traditional JRPG with turn-based battles. Arata's portions are played as a visual novel. The player is forced to continually switch between the two, with the visual novel segments often used to unlock clues or remove barriers that are holding up progress in the RPG portion, and vice versa. In both portions, decisions with multiple options are often presented to the player. Options have consequences, with many leading to instant game over screens or leading to alternate game endings.

== Development ==
The game was first teased as early as June 2017, when developer Compile Heart released a brief video which alluded to a game titled End Request. The game was officially announced in Weekly Famitsu the following week, as the next entry in Compile Heart's Galapagos RPG series of games, which also includes Fairy Fencer F, Omega Quintet, and Fairy Fencer F: Advent Dark Force. In June 2018, at the yearly Anime Expo, Idea Factory announced an English localization with a 2019 scheduled release date. While initially just released on the PlayStation 4, a Microsoft Windows release on Steam was also released in 2019, and a Nintendo Switch version was later released across 2020 and 2021. A sequel, Death End Request 2, was released on PlayStation 4 and Microsoft Windows via Steam in 2020, and was released on Nintendo Switch in 2022. A third numbered entry and a spinoff were revealed to be in development in October 2023. The spinoff title, named Death end re;Quest Code:Z is going to release on September 19, 2024 in Japan, And 2025 in the west on PS4, PS5

== Reception ==
Reception

Aggregate scores
Aggregator	Score
Metacritic	(PS4) 71/100 (NS) 73/100
OpenCritic	50% recommend

Review scores
Publication	Score
Famitsu	8/10, 8/10, 8/10, 7/10
Hardcore Gamer	3.5/5

The PlayStation 4 and Nintendo Switch version of Death End Request both received "mixed or average" reviews from critics, according to the review aggregation website Metacritic. Fellow review aggregator OpenCritic assessed that the game received fair approval, being recommended by 50% of critics.

RPGSite praised the game for being a solid entry and starting point for a new IP by Idea Factory, that the mixing of Neptunia-like anime tropes with a more serious story like Death End Requests' story created some strange tonal shifts, and mused that it would have ultimately been a better visual novel than RPG. Similarly, Hardcore Gamer noted that the JRPG segments were of a good quality, and that the visual novel segments were interesting, but that the two contrasting gameplay segments didn't blend together well, and it felt like being forced into moving back and forth between two entirely different games. Conversely, Digitally Downloaded strongly praised the game's structure, feeling that the two segments worked well together in keeping the player engaged in the overall story. The game received a 8/8/8/7 [31/40] rating from Famitsu in Japan.
