= HTR =

HTR may refer to:

- Handwritten text recognition
- Happy Tiger Records catalog number, e.g. HTR-1006
- Harvard Theological Review
- Hardy Toll Road
- Hateruma Airport, in Okinawa Prefecture, Japan
- Healing Through Remembering
- Head-twitch response, a behavioral proxy of psychedelic-like effects in animals
- The Herald Times Reporter, a newspaper in Manitowoc, Wisconsin, US
- High-temperature reactor, see High-temperature gas reactor
- Historical trauma response
- Horticultural therapist, see Horticultural therapy
- HTR High Tech Racing, a video game
- Hashemite Tribes Regiment, Syrian militant group
- Human telomerase (hTR)
- Hypotensive transfusion reaction
