= Scar-Lead Salvation =

2025 video game

- Developers: Compile Heart; Neilo
- Publishers: Compile Heart; Idea Factory International
- Producer: Hiroshi Aoki
- Platforms: Windows; PlayStation 4; PlayStation 5; Xbox Series X/S
- Release: Windows, PS4, PS5; 29 May 2025; Xbox Series X/S; 2 September 2025
- Genres: Third-person shooter; Bullet hell; Roguelite
- Mode: Single-player

Scar-Lead Salvation (Note: Japanese: スカーレッドサルベーション, Hepburn: Sukaa Reddo Sarubeeshon) is a 2025 third-person shooter video game developed by Compile Heart and Neilo, and published by Compile Heart and Idea Factory International. It was released for PlayStation 4, PlayStation 5, and Windows on May 29, 2025 and for Xbox Series X/S on September 2, 2025.

== Gameplay ==
Scar-Lead Salvation is a third-person shooter with bullet hell and roguelite elements. The player controls Willow Martin, an amnesiac soldier who must escape from an unfamiliar place resided in by hostile mechanical beings. The levels are procedurally generated. When Willow is killed, she loses all of her equipments and must start over from the beginning.

== Development and Release ==
Scar-Lead Salvation was produced by Hiroshi Aoki, who joined Compile Heart in 2021. He had worked on Rune Factory 5, Rune Factory 4 Special, and Taito video games like Dariusburst, Kaiser Knuckle, and Psychic Force. In an interview with Famitsu, the game was recognized as an uncommon title for Compile Heart – being a third-person shooter, a serious sci-fi plot, and a high difficulty – to which Aoki replied he saw it as a new wave for the developer. The two main characters, Willow Martin and AI, were voiced by Fairouz Ai and Junichi Suwabe.

The development team took inspiration from Housemarque's Returnal, another third-person shooter with procedurally-generated levels. Returnal incentivizes not taking any damage. Aoki implemented the similar system to Scar-Lead Salvation, which encourages the player to make use of dodges and parries to keep Willow alive.

The game was first teased through the official website that went online on January 29, 2025; it was fully revealed on January 30 as a part of Compile Heart's 2025 lineup trailer. In Japan, the PlayStation 5 version will be published both physically and digitally, while the PlayStation 4 and PC versions will be digital-only. The publisher Compile Heart announced Special Edition and Digital Deluxe Edition that include additional materials. For the international release, the game is published by Idea Factory International, with the PlayStation versions available both physically and digitally. The game was released on May 29, 2025. The Xbox Series X and Series S versions were released on September 2, 2025.

== Reception ==
Reception

Aggregate scores
Aggregator	Score
Metacritic	PS5: 44/100
OpenCritic	5% recommend

Review scores
Publication	Score
Hardcore Gamer	1.5/5
Shacknews	7/10
Digitally Downloaded	3/5

Scar-Lead Salvation received generally negative reviews. The PlayStation 5 version received "generally unfavorable" reviews according to review aggregator Metacritic. 5% of the critics recommended the game according to OpenCritic.

The roguelike gameplay was criticized for the lack of variety. Zach McKay from Hardcore Gamer faulted the game's repetitive progress structure, saying, "The bones for a good game are there, but everything combined just doesn't add up to something fun to play." Digitally Downloaded found the game's squared metal rooms too similar to one another, and the enemy types repeat too much between levels.
