= Super Tempo =

1998 video game

- Developers: Aspect, Red Company
- Publisher: MediaQuest
- Directors: Keisaku Okumura; Keisuke Abe
- Producers: Yasuaki Nagoshi; Kazuyuki Oikawa
- Designers: Mussies; Teruo Hamai
- Programmer: Toshikatsu Fujii
- Artists: Takeshi Tsukioka; Keita Komiyama
- Composers: Masayoshi Ishi; Hiroyuki Hamada
- Platform: Sega Saturn
- Release: JP: April 29, 1998
- Genre: Platform game
- Mode: Single player

Super Tempo (Note: Super Tempo (スーパーテンポ)) is a 1998 platform video game co-developed by Aspect and Red Company and published by MediaQuest for the Sega Saturn. It followed Tempo for the Sega 32X and Tempo Jr. for the Game Gear. The game uses stylized 2D cartoon graphics.

== Plot ==
In the winter music world, the Prince of Music World is kidnapped and taken to The Planet Technotch. Meanwhile, the green grasshopper boy “Tempo” and his girlfriend, the cabbage white butterfly girl “Katy” went bankrupt. After discovering a happy blue bird, the two follow the bird and find a mysterious house. There, they realized that the Prince of Music World was kidnapped. Tempo now teams up with Katy to rescue the Prince of Music World from Planet Technotch and thus, the story of their exit from bankruptcy began.

== Development ==
Super Tempo is a sequel to the Sega 32X title Tempo, and marks the third and final game in the Tempo series. The series was developed by RED Company, who also developed the Sakura Taisen and Bonk's Adventure series of games. The game was featured at the 1998 Tokyo Game Show video game convention.

== Gameplay ==
The game offers 2D platforming sections, as well as musical themed rhythm sections. Players take control of the character Tempo, who can create bubbles to defeat enemies. Musical notes are collected throughout the stages, and if enough are found, they can be exchanged in an arcade to play mini-games.

== Release ==
Super Tempo was released on April 29, 1998 for the Sega Saturn and was published by MediaQuest.

== Reception ==
Reception

Review scores
Publication	Score
Famitsu	25/40
Gamers' Republic	B
Ação Games	7.5/10
Sega Saturn Magazine	19/30
Super GamePower	4.3
Gamers	

Famitsu gave the game a score of 25 out of 40.

Three reviewers for the Japanese publication Sega Saturn Magazine gave the game a score of 8, 6, and 5, for a total of 19 out of 30.

The UK Sega Saturn Magazine compared the game to the game Rayman, however noting that Rayman was the better game and cheaper than importing a game from Japan. They noted the graphics were "colorful", however they seemed rather basic and said it looked too similar to 16 bit games. They also said that some stages were inappropriate for children, including a pet cemetery stage that includes the ghosts of dead yard animals.

Gamers' Republic gave the game a B.

Reviewing it as an import, the Brazilian magazine Ação Games gave it 7.5/10, comparing it to Rayman and praising its graphics, but noting its high difficulty and young target demographic.
