= Tempo (video game) =

1995 video game for the Sega 32X

- Japanese box art
- Developers: Sega CS3; Red Company
- Publisher: NA: Sega
- Director: Keisuke Abe
- Composers: Masayoshi Ishi; Hiroyuki Hamada
- Platform: Sega 32X
- Release: JP: March 24, 1995; NA: 1995; BR: 1995
- Genre: Platform game
- Mode: Single player

Tempo (Note: テンポ) is a platform video game developed by Red Company and published by Sega in 1995 for the Sega 32X.

== Gameplay and premise ==
A grasshopper character named Tempo and his friend, Katy, star on The Major Minor Show as they climb the top of the tower to defeat King Dirge. The stages are presented as performances on a musical variety show like Soul Train.

== Development and release ==
According to former Sega staff member Takayuki Kawagoe, Tempo was initially developed for the Mega Drive, but was converted to the 32X on short notice so that it could have a larger game library. The game was directed by Keisuke Abe, creator of the Bonk series of platformers. The game uses hand-drawn graphics for the backgrounds and sprites.

== Reception ==
Reception

Review scores
Publication	Score
Game Informer	3.5/10
Game Players	47%
IGN	7/10
M! Games	60%
Next Generation	2/5
Video Games (DE)	64%
Electronic Games	C−
Sega Saturn Magazine (JP)	5.75/10
VideoGames	8/10

The Japanese publication Micom BASIC Magazine ranked Tempo eighth in popularity in its June 1995 issue, and it received a 7.2222/10 score in a 1995 readers' poll conducted by the Japanese Sega Saturn Magazine, ranking among 32X and Sega Mega Drive titles at the number 256 spot. The game received mixed reviews from critics. GamePro's Captain Squideo highlighted the game's dazzling background graphics, rich soundtrack, and low difficulty for novices, but noted the lack of originality in the gameplay. Next Generation assessed that "none of [its] good qualities keep Tempo from missing the beat and being yet another poor 32X effort".

== Sequels ==
In part because it was released on the failed 32X add-on, it failed to find an audience. Sega tried again with two more games: a spinoff titled Tempo Jr. in 1995 for the Game Gear, and a sequel titled Super Tempo in 1998 for the Sega Saturn.

Famicom Tsūshin scored Tempo Jr. an 18 out of 40.
