= Calamity Angels: Special Delivery =

- Developer: Compile Heart
- Publisher: Idea Factory International
- Artist: Kei Nanameda
- Platforms: Nintendo Switch, PlayStation 4, PlayStation 5, Windows
- Release: JP: 26 June 2025; NA: 15 April 2026
- Genre: Role-playing
- Mode: Single-player

Calamity Angels: Special Delivery (Note: Japanese: 届けろ！戦え！カラミティエンジェルズ, Hepburn: Todokero! Tatakae! Calamity Angels) is a 2025 role-playing video game developed by Compile Heart and published by Compile Heart and Idea Factory International. The game was released for Nintendo Switch, PlayStation 4, and PlayStation 5 on 26 June 2025 in Japan.

== Gameplay ==
Calamity Angels: Special Delivery is a role-playing video game where the player lead a group of carriers that manage delivery service in the fantastical Orkotris Region. The player must make deliveries by assembling a crew with appropriate gears and tools. A successful drop-off grants the player rewards.

== Development and release ==
The character designs were created by Kei Nanameda, the artist of Mary Skelter: Nightmares and the Mugen Souls series.

Calamity Angels was among the seven unveiled video games by Compile Heart on 5 October 2023 after the developer's announcement of the transition to a new management structure. The game was originally planned to launch for Nintendo Switch, PlayStation 4, and PlayStation 5 in Japan in summer 2024, followed by Microsoft Windows via Steam. In July 2024, the release window was moved to summer 2025. On 13 February 2025, Idea Factory International announced it would publish the game in the west both physically and digitally. The international versions will feature English and Japanese voiceovers. The Japanese release date was finalized as 26 June 2025.

The game was released in North America and Europe on 15 April 2026.
