= Monster Monpiece =

2013 video game

- Japanese box art, featuring (from left to right) Elza, May, Fia and Karen
- Developer: Compile Heart
- Publishers: JP: Idea Factory; WW: Idea Factory International
- Artist: Fukahire
- Series: Genkai Tokki
- Platforms: PlayStation Vita, Microsoft Windows
- Release: PlayStation Vita: JP: January 24, 2013; NA: May 27, 2014; EU: June 4, 2014; Microsoft Windows: WW: March 14, 2017
- Genre: Card battle
- Modes: Single-player; Multiplayer (Vita only)

Monster Monpiece (Japanese: 限界凸騎 モンスターモンピース, Hepburn: Genkai Tokki Monsutā Monpīsu; lit. "Unlikely Knight: Monster Monpiece") is a card battle video game developed by Compile Heart for the PC and PlayStation Vita. The game re-imagines mythological creatures and monsters, such as unicorns and minotaurs, as girls and women created by more than 50 different artists. The game allows multiplayer card battles online for 2 players. The game is based around battling with four types of cards, not all of which are monsters. Monster Monpiece was released on January 24, 2013 in Japan, and an English localization was released by Idea Factory International in May 2014.

A port for Microsoft Windows, originally announced for a 2016 Steam release, will include all original uncensored artwork, however will not support multiplayer gameplay. The game was officially released on Steam on March 14, 2017. It is the first in Compile Heart's Genkai Tokki series of video games, followed by Moe Chronicle, Moero Crystal, and Genkai Tokki: Seven Pirates. A direct sequel, titled Monster Monpiece Naked for iOS and Android devices, was released on 29 May 2016 with services being terminated on 29 September 2017.

== Gameplay ==
The "extreme rub" system requires players to stroke both sides of the PlayStation Vita in order to seal the card and remove the clothing from the character in the card.

Monster Monpiece is a card battle game where users collect virtual cards and use them to battle foes. Battles are turn-based and take place on a 7x3 grid in which cards can be placed. During a player's turn, he or she can drag and drop monster girl cards onto the grid field to activate them. The game contains over 100 different cards divided into four types, and not all of them are "monsters". The four types are melee, ranged, healer, and booster. Melee cards have strong attacks, can survive many attacks, and are good for close-ranged combat. Ranged cards do not have as strong of attacks, but they can attack enemy cards from a distance. Healer cards can heal the wounds of other friendly cards in play. Booster cards support other cards in play by increasing the strength of their attacks or increasing the healer's abilities. Neptune from Hyperdimension Neptunia receives a cameo appearance if the player reserves the game.

The game utilizes an "extreme rub" system (known officially as the "First Crush ❤ Rub" mode) to seal cards: "Poking, rubbing, and touching" the Vita's screen removes the character's clothing in stages, "from thick clothes to lightly dressed to skimpy bathing suit." The sealing system is split into two parts: one requires the player to poke or tap on the female character's private parts and the other requires the player to stroke the entire screen on both sides of the system (pictured). Touching the monster girls also causes their chest and thighs to jiggle in response.

== Plot ==
In the world of Yafanir (ヤファニール) in which two enormous pillars known as the Hammers of God penetrate the Earth, a race known as the monster girls have come to coexist with humans. May, Elza, and Karen are best friends at the Academy of Kunaguvu (クナグヴァ) where they learn to become Masters of the monster girls, but a mysterious person curses Elza and she becomes Lost. Trying to learn what master plan has been unleashed, May follows Elza, gathering treasure scattered across the world, and using the monster girls' Magus Quartz crystals to help on the way.

== Development ==
The game is developed for the PlayStation Vita by Compile Heart, the creators of Hyperdimension Neptunia. Originally slated for release in spring 2013, in November 2012 it was announced that the release would be moved up to January 24, 2013. The game includes artwork of legendary creatures re-imagined as girls from more than 50 different artists. An English localization for Monster Monpiece was announced by Compile Heart on January 21, 2014. On January 23, 2014, Idea Factory sent out a formal press release to address the issue of censorship in Monster Monpiece. The release dates for the localization was initially announced on May 9, with the game planned to be released on May 27 in North America and May 28 in Europe, however, the European release date was later pushed back to June 4; this was done in order to allow the game to be available in Germany, Russia, and Switzerland, where it was originally unavailable. Unlike the original Japanese version, the English localization is a digital-only title.

=== Ratings ===
The English localization features all gameplay features and complete storyline, however several card images were cut from the North American and European versions of the game, citing concerns regarding the sexual nature of the imagery. Following the cut, PEGI has given the game a rating of 12+, compared to the CERO D (17+) rating of the original Japanese version. Imagery for the high level evolution forms of the Vampire, Kraken, Goblin, Cockatrice, Kobold, Skeleton, Titania, Bahamut, Fia, Brownie, Pegasus, Mandragora, Mau Sibau, Rafflesia, Death Scorpion, Phantom, and Tengu cards have been removed. While the PEGI rating in Europe was lighter, the game received an ESRB rating of M in the United States at the request of Idea Factory International, who opted for a stronger rating citing the sexual nature of the game.

== Reception and sales ==
Reception

Aggregate scores
Aggregator	Score
GameRankings	68.38%
Metacritic	67/100

Review scores
Publication	Score
Famitsu	33/40
IGN	4.9/10
Hardcore Gamer	3.5/5
RPG Site	8/10
Gaming Age	B+

Monster Monpiece currently holds a score of 68% at GameRankings, and 67/100 at Metacritic. Four Famitsu reviewers scored the game 8, 9, 8 and 8 out of 10, for a total score of 33/40. The method of sealing cards in which the user rubs and strokes the female characters in the game has been criticized as inappropriate by Western commentators. The game reportedly sold through the majority of its initial 27,000 copy shipment, prompting Compile Heart to issue an apology for the lack of stock. The game sold 25,000 physical retail copies in its first week, in addition to 5,000 digital download copies via the PlayStation Network; and has sold more than 50,000 copies as of February 9, 2013. The game ranked as the ninth most purchased digital Vita game on the Japanese PlayStation Network in 2013.

Hardcore Gamer scored Monster Monpiece 3.5/5, praising all aspects of the game save for the "extreme rub" system, saying "Without the silly rubbing gimmick, Monpiece features deep, rewarding nuances, a bevy of customization options, fantastic production values and the ability to take one’s poured over deck online to square off against folks from around the world. In plain terms, it didn't need the gimmick to catch people’s attention — it could have easily relied upon its actual gameplay, and that would have sufficed." Gamestyle regards the gameplay mechanics as a strong aspect of the game, however notes that there is a large cultural difference that pushes many boundaries in Western countries, where it may feel inappropriate for players to rub characters in a sexual manner. No final score was given.

Colin Moriarty of IGN reviewed Monster Monpiece negatively, scoring the game a 4.9/10, criticizing the story, characters, upgrading system and environments. However, the game's card battling system was praised; the review summarising "Whether it's its humdrum cast of characters, tedious dialogue, desolate environments, or questionable upgrade systems, Monster Monpiece's core has a hard — almost impossible — time emerging from the crap that surrounds it." RPG Site, however, was much more positive about Monster Monpiece, rewarding it a 8/10 score and praising story voice acting and gameplay, saying "Replayability is very high as there are hundreds of different types of cards to collect that can all be modified to help create the perfect deck for you, providing a highly valuable experience that many people would be able to enjoy. Monster Monpiece comes well recommended. Just don't overthink the "rubbing" system, and you'll be fine. Gaming Age rated Monster Monpiece B+, finding the gameplay and characters to be fleshed out and enjoyable, but also that the game's rubbing system makes it "hard to embrace" fully.
