= Moero Chronicle =

2014 video game

Moe Chronicle
- Developer: Compile Heart
- Publishers: JP: Compile Heart; AS: Sony Computer Entertainment
- Director: Makoto Kitano
- Producer: Norihisa Kochiwa
- Designer: Katsuyuki Hirano
- Series: Genkai Tokki
- Platforms: PlayStation Vita, Microsoft Windows, Nintendo Switch
- Release: PlayStation Vita: JP: May 15, 2014; AS: May 5, 2015; Microsoft Windows: WW: August 16, 2017; Nintendo Switch: WW: April 26, 2019
- Genres: Role-playing, dungeon crawler
- Mode: Single-player

Moero Chronicle, commonly known in Japan as Genkai Tokki Moero Chronicle (限界凸記 モエロクロニクル, Genkai Tokki Moero Kuronikuru), is a dungeon crawler role-playing video game developed by Compile Heart for the PlayStation Vita themed around collecting moe' reinterpretations of JRPG fantasy monsters. It is the second game in Compile Heart's Genkai Tokki series of video games, following Monster Monpiece and preceding direct sequel Moero Crystal and Genkai Tokki: Seven Pirates. Moero Chronicle was released on May 15, and an Asian release featuring Chinese and English subtitles was later published by Sony Computer Entertainment and released on May 5, 2015 as "Moe Chronicle". It was then released on Steam with English, Japanese and Chinese subtitles on August 16, 2017, as Moero Chronicle reverting back to its original name. On April 26, 2019, the game was released as Moero Chronicle Hyper on the Nintendo Switch with pre-orders opening for a physical version later that year.

== Gameplay ==
The game is a dungeon crawler where the player is required to navigate through maps containing enemies. Battles are turn-based, and involve attacking parts of enemy monster girls so that their clothes fall off; eventually at the end of the battle, the player is required to rub the monster girl using the front and rear touchpads of the PlayStation Vita, in a manner similar to that of the previous game Monster Monpiece. The player decides on which monster girls are placed within the party, and are able to swap their underwear, which serves as the main customizable equipment of the game. Changing underwear affects the abilities each girl has, in addition to their skill points. Strange Monsters can also be obtained and combined with Raw Material Panties to create new items, depending on the combination of raw materials used.

The player is able to visit the personal rooms of monster girls to bond with them and raise their affection, where they may give them presents or trigger special event scenes. Upon befriending a monster girl, they are added to a compendium, where the player can view artwork of the girls without makeup applied.

== Plot ==
The player plays as Io, an ordinary boy with a tender heart, whom village elders force to "go on a journey" to save the world from disaster. Io, although ambitious, is scared to talk to girls in fear of them labeling him as a pervert. Crises are occurring all over the world at the beginning of the game, and "monster girls", which inhabit it, have suddenly become hostile to humans, with a "legendary monster girl" thought to be the cause. Other characters include Lilia, who is a childhood monster girl friend of Io, a monster cat friend named Leche, Koko, who is the daughter of a yet unknown character, and Otton, the seal mascot of the game, who is described as a "wandering panty hunter".

=== Characters ===
- Coco: A monster girl with unknown origins.
- Latte: Leader of the first area of Monstopia.
- Calypso: Sahagin-type monster girl.
- Typica: Mandragora-type monster girl.
- Airi: Medusa-type monster girl.
- Mocha: Succubus monster girl.
- Matari: Golem-type monster girl.
- Ranju: Yuki-onna girl.

== Development ==
The game was announced in the December 2013 issue of Dengeki PlayStation. It was originally planned to be released on April 24, 2014, in Japan, though, following delays, the release date was postponed to May 15. Character designs are handled by Katsuyuki Hirano, who was also character designer for Record of Agarest War. The game is directed by Makoto Kitano, and is produced by Norihisa Kochiwa. Like Monster Monpiece before it, Moero Chronicle also includes mythological creatures reimagined as monster girls. Moe Chronicle was released in Greater Asia on May 5, 2015; the localization featured both Chinese and English translations, with none of the original content from the Japanese version altered than the game's name. The Asian version features an R-18+ GSRR rating, and is available in physical retail copies.

== Reception and sales ==
Famitsu gave the Japanese version of Moero Chronicle a review score of 31/40.

Supply of the game amongst retailers became limited within the first week of release in Japan as it became sold out within stores, with an initial batch of 50,000 copies shipped nationwide. That week, the game sold 32,957 copies, placing second place within the Japanese software sales charts behind The Idolmaster One For All.

Operation Rainfall scored Moe Chronicle 3.5 stars out of 5, praising the music, art, and ecchi content, but criticized the gameplay due to its lack of depth, writing "if you are into Compile Heart, dungeon RPGs and ecchi – this game is perfect for you if you haven’t picked it up yet, even if you only want to show support for uncensored Asian English releases."
