= Dragon Star Varnir =

2018 video game

- Developer: Compile Heart
- Publisher: Idea Factory
- Director: Makoto Kitano
- Producer: Norihisa Kochiwa
- Composers: Yoh Ohyama; Motoi Sakuraba
- Platforms: PlayStation 4, Windows, Nintendo Switch
- Release: PlayStation 4: JP: October 11, 2018; NA: June 11, 2019; EU: June 13, 2019; Windows: WW: October 9, 2019; Nintendo Switch: JP: May 27, 2021; WW: August 3, 2021
- Genre: Role-playing
- Mode: Single-player

Dragon Star Varnir (Note: Ryū Hoshi no Varnir (竜星のヴァルニール, Ryū Hoshi no Varunīru)) is a 2018 role-playing video game developed by Compile Heart and published by Idea Factory. It was released for the PlayStation 4 in Japan in October 2018 and worldwide in June 2019, for Windows in October 2019, and for Nintendo Switch in 2021. The game follows a knight named Zephy who is tasked to fight witches and dragons, but is turned into a witch by his enemies in order to save him from death by the hands of a dragon. The game received generally favorable reviews from critics, who praised its battle system as an improvement from past Compile Heart games but criticized other aspects of its presentation.

== Reception ==
Reception

Aggregate scores
Aggregator	Score
Metacritic	PS4: 75/100; NS: 64/100
OpenCritic	52% recommend

Review scores
Publication	Score
RPGamer	2.5/5
RPGFan	79/100

Dragon Star Varnir received "generally favorable reviews" according to review aggregator Metacritic. Fellow review aggregator OpenCritic assessed that the game received fair approval, being recommended by 52% of critics. Matt Sainsbury of Digitally Downloaded rated the game 90/100, saying the game "ratchets things up" from the developer's "budget, fanservicey JRPGs" with a "rich bit of storytelling", and saying that "battles [...] never become rote". Zach Wilkerson of RPGFan rated it 79/100, calling the battle system where the game "truly shines", though criticizing the story as "never reach[ing] the potential of its engaging premise", and saying that "too much happens at the beginning", with every major character introduced in the first half hour, hurting their character development. Brian Santana of IGN Spain rated it 65/100, criticizing the plot as simplistic with "flat characters", but praising the battle system and its tactical components.
