= Death End Request 2 =

- Developer(s): Compile Heart
- Publisher(s): Idea Factory
- Writer(s): Makoto Kedouin
- Platform(s): PlayStation 4, Windows Nintendo Switch
- Release: PlayStation 4: JP: February 13, 2020; NA: August 25, 2020; PAL: August 28, 2020; Windows: WW: August 18, 2020; Nintendo Switch: JP: August 19, 2021; NA: February 8, 2022; PAL: February 11, 2022
- Genre(s): Role-playing, visual novel
- Mode(s): Single-player

Death End Request 2 (stylized as Death end re;Quest 2) is an hybrid Japanese role-playing and visual novel video game developed by Compile Heart and published by Idea Factory. The game released worldwide for Windows and PlayStation 4 in August 2020, and was ported to the Nintendo Switch in 2021. The game is largely a stand-alone story from its predecessor, Death End Request.

== Gameplay ==
Similar to its predecessor, Death End Request, the game is a hybrid JRPG and visual novel. Like the original, gameplay is split into two portions, though instead of the contrast being virtual world and real world, now the two gameplay type span across day and night segments in the game. During the day, the game plays as a visual novel, as the player works through reading the game's story. At night, the game plays as a third person traditional RPG where the player must explore dungeons and fight monsters. The game's battles are turn-based, and retains the prior game's mechanic of being able to strike opposing characters around the battle field in a pinball-like manner. However, the game does drop the prior entry's mini-games that temporarily altered gameplay into different other genres.

== Story ==
The game follows the character Mai Toyama, a teenage girl struggling to fit in at the all-girl Woodsworth Academy. She explores the academy, and surrounding town of Le Choara upon feeling suspicions about things not being right. While some characters from the original game do make appearance, the game is generally described as a stand-alone experience.

== Development ==
The game was first announced for the PlayStation 4 in July 2019. The game was developed by Japanese studio Compile Heart, and published by Idea Factory. The game was written by Corpse Party writer Makoto Kedouin. A Steam version of the game was announced for its English localization in the west, and was released alongside the PlayStation 4 version in August 2020. The game received a release in Japan in December 2020. A special edition of the game contained a "midquel 1.5 novel" packaged with the game. A version for the Nintendo Switch was later announced and released in 2021, with a February 2022 western release.

== Reception ==
Reviewers generally shared more positive sentiments towards the game's narrative and characters, and less positive commentary on its graphics and gameplay. Reviewers were more divided on whether or not it was a better game than its predecessor. Digitally Downloaded felt the game lacked the impact the first game had due to its similarities in concept, but offered more praise than most others for the depth and nuance of its story. Hardcore Gamer felt it was the more enjoyable title of the two, citing its story, and improved battle system. RPGFan agreed with the improvements and streamlining of the battle system, and also felt it improved upon its predecessor's "confusing map design." RPGamer praised the story as generally good, though inconsistent, with parts that were either slow or confusing, such as the game's connections to its prior entry. Its battle system and graphics were also criticized as sub-par by the publication.
