= Record of Agarest War Zero =

2009 video game

- North American box art
- Developers: Idea Factory; Laughing Jackal (PC)
- Publishers: JP: Compile Heart, Red Entertainment; NA: Aksys Games; EU: Ghostlight
- Platforms: PlayStation 3, Xbox 360, Microsoft Windows, Android OS, iOS
- Release: PlayStation 3: JP: June 25, 2009; NA: June 14, 2011; EU: August 26, 2011; Xbox 360: JP: July 29, 2010; NA: June 14, 2011; Microsoft Windows: WW: April 17, 2014; Android: WW: October 19, 2014; iOS: WW: November 27, 2014
- Genre: Tactical RPG
- Mode: Single-player

Record of Agarest War Zero, known as Agarest Senki Zero (アガレスト戦記 ZERO, Agaresuto Senki Zero) in Japan and Agarest: Generations of War Zero in Europe, is a tactical role-playing game developed by Compile Heart and Red Entertainment. It was published in Japan by Idea Factory on June 25, 2009, for the PlayStation 3. It is the prequel to the 2007 game Record of Agarest War.

An enhanced port of Agarest Zero was released for the Xbox 360 titled Agarest Senki Zero: Dawn of War. The Xbox 360 version contained extra content not found in the PlayStation 3 version of the game, such as costumes, CGs and more. HyperDevbox Japan released ports for Android and iOS.

Both versions feature an extra mode where you can return to the maps from the previous game, and unlock characters via the PlayStation Store or Xbox Live Marketplace.

== Gameplay ==
The battles are the same as the first game, the maps, and the Soul Breed System. Two new systems were introduced, The Feel Link System and the Free Intention. There is also an Extra Mode.

=== Feel Link ===
A new system is introduced called the Feel Link System. The Feel Link system is where the heroine's costume and dialog depend on their relationship level.

=== Free Intention ===
Another new system where players can build relationship with the heroines. This may result in new costumes, CGs, and items. This is accessed by the City Menu.

=== Extra Mode ===
If the players have Clear Data from the first game, it is possible to load it and unlock the Door to the Future after some progress. Through the door, players can access the maps from the first game and unlock items and characters from the first game. Leo, his descendants, the heroines, Ellis and Dyshana are unlocked free. However, other playable characters must be downloaded from the PlayStation Store.

== Characters ==
Agarest Zero has a total of 15 playable characters (9 in the first generation and 6 in the second). Characters from the first game can be unlocked via DLC and the Extra Mode.

== Localization ==
On November 5, 2010, Aksys Games announced that it will bring both the PlayStation 3 and Xbox 360 versions of Agarest Senki Zero to North America as Record of Agarest War Zero. Both versions were released on June 14, 2011.

Ghostlight released Agarest Zero in Europe as a PlayStation 3 exclusive as Agarest: Generations of War Zero on August 26, 2011.
