= Record of Agarest War 2 =

2010 video game

- North American cover art
- Developer(s): Idea Factory; Red Entertainment; Laughing Jackal (PC)
- Publisher(s): JP: Compile Heart; NA: Aksys Games; EU: Ghostlight
- Platform(s): PlayStation 3, Microsoft Windows
- Release: PlayStation 3: JP: November 18, 2010; NA: June 26, 2012; EU: August 31, 2012; Microsoft Windows; February 19, 2015
- Genre(s): Tactical role-playing
- Mode(s): Single-player

Record of Agarest War 2, known as Agarest Senki 2 (アガレスト戦記2, Agaresuto Senki 2) in Japan and as Agarest: Generations of War 2 in Europe, is a tactical role-playing game developed by Idea Factory and Red Entertainment. It was published in Japan by Compile Heart on November 18, 2010 for the PlayStation 3. A Windows version was released on February 19, 2015. It is the sequel to the 2007 game Record of Agarest War and the third game in the series.

A patch via download allows for use of a PlayStation Move motion controller for certain mini-games.

The Soul Breeding system receives a new additional feature with the implementation of a "Dark Love" ending which occurs if the relationship rate is low with the chosen mate. Rather than a happy wedding, the main character has a marriage with his bride for political interests and enters a loveless relationship to conceive a child, resulting in poor stats for the next protagonist.

== Plot ==
One day, the world was enveloped by a mysterious blinding light. The destruction it caused was terrible, even as the light itself was sublime in its beauty, and it made those who witnessed the awesome display think of the unrestrained rage and fury of the divine.

The central continent, from where the light is believed to have originated from, went silent, while at the same time demons began to spread throughout the world like a plague. Amongst the survivors of the catastrophe, that fateful day became known as the "Day of Light."

Sometime after the events of the Day of Light, a young man by the name of Weiss, who had lost all memory of himself, encounters an enigmatic woman named Eva, who introduces herself as an Agent of the Divine. It is from her that Weiss learns that he has committed the grievous sin of deicide, and that in order for him to atone for his crime he is to become the "Vessel" in which the power of the divinity he had slaughtered will be stored. For it will be that power that will be used to resurrect the one whose life he stole.

For those who betray the divine will pay for their sins in the space which separates salvation and damnation, as will their progeny...

== Gameplay ==
=== Differences/Improvements ===
There are many changes and improvements from the original Agarest games.

- There are only 3 generations in this game.
- There are 18 members in this game: 7 in the First Generation, 6 in the Second Generation and 5 in the Third Generation.
- Featured in the game Trinity Universe, Agarest uses the AAA (Active Animation Adventure) system. It is more fluid than Agarest War Zero.
- Party members now have relationship ratings.
- Only up to 4 party members can be on the field instead of 6.
- Party Members who are not in play will still receive EXP Points.
- You can switch the party members on the field using the Leader command.
- PP (Party Points) can now be distributed to two new categories called Dex (Dexterity, which replaces Luck) and Mnd (Mind, which affects your Resistance).
- When you level up, most of the PP you receive is automatically distributed, but you can still retract them if necessary.
- First game in the Agarest series where you can choose any bride regardless of relationship level, with the stats for the next protagonist getting higher or lower depending on it.
- You can travel the world map like normal RPGs, while traverse points still use the point to point map.
- Battle system has been changed to the system Cross Edge uses.
- EX Skills are now called Original Skills.
- Will Power has been removed, EX Skills replaces Will Power.
- EP has been removed, everything EPs were used for now use gold instead.
- Certain CGs are not still images, and are moving and more active.
- First Agarest game to feature minigames that can utilize the PlayStation Move.
- First Agarest game where the player is capable of traveling to all 5 continents during the First Generation.
- Now uses HD sprites instead of standard sprites.
