= Ariana and the Elder Codex =

- Developer: Hyde
- Publishers: Compile Heart; Idea Factory International
- Director: Aoki Hiroshi
- Platforms: Nintendo Switch; PlayStation 4; PlayStation 5; Windows
- Release: Switch, PS4, PS5: JP: 21 August 2025; WW: 24 March 2026; Windows: WW: 29 April 2026; iOS, Android: NA: 22 July 2026
- Genre: Action role-playing
- Mode: Single-player

Ariana and the Elder Codex (Note: Japanese: 魔法司書アリアナ 七英傑の書, Hepburn: Mahou Shisho Ariana ~Shichi Eiketsu no Sho~; Magical Librarian Ariana: The Books of the Seven Heroes) is an action role-playing game developed by Hyde and published by Compile Heart and Idea Factory International. It was released for the Nintendo Switch, PlayStation 4, and PlayStation 5 on 21 August 2025. In the game, Ariana must repair the Seven Hero Codices and restore magic to the world.

== Gameplay ==
Ariana and the Elder Codex is an action role-playing game with Metroidvania elements. The player controls Ariana, who primarily fights with a host of magic spells. When spells are cast against an enemy for certain times, the enemy becomes stunned, allowing Ariana to attack them with high damage.

== Development and release ==
Developer Hyde is based in Tokyo. Ariana and the Elder Codex was directed by Aoki Hiroshi, who developed Rune Factory 5, Rune Factory 4 Special, Dariusburst, and Psychic Force. The game was developed for the PlayStation 4, PlayStation 5, and Nintendo Switch.

The game was first revealed in January 2025 in the latest issue of Weekly Famitsu. It was one of the seven titles included in Compile Heart's 2025 lineup. It was released by Compile Heart on 21 August 2025 in Japan. Idea Factory International published the international release on 24 March 2026. The console versions were available both physically and digitally. The Windows version was released via Steam on 29 April. The game was released through the Crunchyroll Game Vault service for Android and iOS on 22 July.

== Reception ==
Reception

Aggregate scores
Aggregator	Score
Metacritic	PS5: 74/100; NS: 79/100
OpenCritic	56% recommend (Note: Based on 27 reviews)

Review scores
Publication	Score
Famitsu	31/40
RPGamer	3/5
Digitally Downloaded	4/5
Siliconera	7/10

According to review aggregator Metacritic, Ariana and the Elder Codex received "mixed or average" reviews for the PlayStation 5 version, and "generally favorable" reviews for the Nintendo Switch version. 56% of the critics recommended the game according to OpenCritic.

The Famitsu reviewers rated the game 31 out of 40.
