= Genkai Tokki: Seven Pirates =

2016 video game

- PlayStation Vita box art
- Developer: Felistella
- Publishers: JP: Compile Heart; WW: Eastasiasoft
- Producer: Norihisa Kochiwa
- Artist: Motor
- Series: Genkai Tokki
- Platforms: PlayStation Vita; Nintendo Switch
- Release: PlayStation Vita: JP: August 4, 2016; Nintendo Switch: JP: February 3, 2022; WW: May 12, 2022
- Genre: Role-playing
- Mode: Single-player

Genkai Tokki: Seven Pirates (限界凸旗 セブンパイレーツ) is a role-playing video game for the PlayStation Vita developed by Felistella and published by Compile Heart. It is the fourth entry in the Genkai Tokki series, after Monster Monpiece, Moero Chronicle, and Moero Crystal. Unlike the previous games, it carries a pirate-based theme, and follows protagonist Parute Kairi as she searches for treasure on the Monsupi Sea. Like previous games, Genkai Tokki: Seven Pirates places emphasis on ecchi content. The game was released on August 4, 2016, in Japan only. A port for Nintendo Switch titled, Genkai Tokki: Seven Pirates H, was released on February 3, 2022, in Japan, and on May 12, 2022, globally under the name Seven Pirates H.

== Gameplay ==
Seven Pirates follows the story of several female characters (including the protagonist, Parute) as they go on an adventure in search of seven "treasures". The game's cast is exclusively female, and no male characters appear in the game. There are seven major characters, though in a similar vein to previous Genkai Tokki titles, many monster girls also appear, rendered in 3D. Like previous Genkai Tokki titles, there is an emphasis on fanservice content, including the breasts of the characters. This includes a "Chest Growth" system, where the girls' chests grow or shrink when players "pinch, grab and poke" them using the touchscreen functionality. Larger breasts result in higher attack power and defense, while smaller busts reward higher speed. Players can freely move around the world map by riding on their pirate ship. By discovering the sea chart through dungeons and quests, the explorable area expands. Dungeons, characters and monsters are represented and interacted with in the form of a 3D role-playing video game. Places, where the characters cannot move normally, can be reached by riding on the character Otton.

== Story ==
=== Plot ===
A pirate girl named Parute is in the middle of a voyage to find treasure and arrives at the "Monsupi Sea", a phantom ocean where treasured is rumoured to be hidden. No humans live there, although various monster girls call the area home. On this unknown land, while surrounded by strange creatures, Parute decides to look for treasure, thus starting her adventure and the storyline of Genkai Tokki: Seven Pirates.

=== Characters ===
The seven main characters of Genkai Tokki: Seven Pirates:

- Parute Kairi (voiced by Shizuka Ishigami), a human girl and primary protagonist who unexpectedly washes ashore on the Monsupi Sea. She is bright and positive, and decides to use the situation to search for treasure.
- Waffle (voiced by Sumire Uesaka), a kobold monster girl treasure hunting in the Monsupi Sea. She is mischievous and likes having fun, with her nose coming in handy when searching for treasure.
- Jewel (voiced by Kana Asumi), a slime pirate monster girl who owns her own ship on the Monsupi Sea.
- Claret (voiced by Mao Ichimichi), a kraken pirate monster girl who attacked a ship after bumping into it whilst drifting about on the sea.
- Sakyura (voiced by Madoka Yonezawa), a demon-looking monster girl who lays waste to pirate ships for the sake of being bad. She utilizes charming attacks as she is confident of her sex appeal.
- Poron (voiced by Chinami Hashimoto), a skeleton monster girl living abroad a ghost ship. As she is shut-in on a haunted ship, she is quiet although also naive in selfishness.
- Rindo (voiced by Mariko Honda), a dragon monster girl and captain of pirates. She has confidence in her skills and finds most things bothersome, preferring to settle disputes by fighting rather than talking.

Additional side characters:

- Mimii (voiced by Natsumi Takamori), a mimic monster girl carrying hidden treasure.
- Neko (voiced by Kaoru Sakura), a cat-eared monster girl.
- Riviera (voiced by Kana Yūki), a monster girl aiming at Parute and company.
- Garnet (voiced by Hisako Tōjō), a monster girl who wears glasses and protects the ruins.
- Doroa (voiced by Megumi Toda), a monster girl who attacks those who enter unexplored areas.
- Otton (voiced by Tomokazu Sugita), a monster kid who wears a bra on his head. He is a pirate veteran and carries information about hidden treasure. He is a returning character from previous Genkai Tokki games and is the mascot of the series.

== Development ==
The game was first announced in March 2016, on website Dengeki Online. Additional information was revealed in a weekly issue of Dengeki PlayStation. Further details were released during the Dengeki Game Festival, including a teaser trailer and information on the characters, gameplay, as well as character illustrations. An April issue of Dengeki PlayStation dated the game's release date as August 4, 2016 in Japan. First screenshots of the game, as well as an official website and additional characters were introduced shortly afterward. The first gameplay trailer for Seven Pirates was released on May 18, 2016.

Producer Norihisa Kochiwa noted that although "at first glance, you might only see the game for its sex appeal", the game's content is also thoroughly produced. Character designs are handled by artist Motor.

== Reception ==
All four Famitsu reviewers scored Genkai Tokki: Seven Pirates 8 out of 10, for a total score of 32/40. The game sold 12,264 copies during its first week on sale, placing 7th for all video game sales that week.

=== Genkai Tokki: Seven Pirates H ===
Reception

Aggregate score
Aggregator	Score
Metacritic	64/100

Review scores
Publication	Score
Nintendo Life	6/10
RPGamer	3.0/5

Genkai Tokki: Seven Pirates H received "mixed or average" reviews according to review aggregator Metacritic.
