= Omega Quintet =

2014 video game

- North American cover art
- Developer: Galapagos RPG
- Publishers: JP: Compile Heart; WW: Idea Factory International; Microsoft Windows: WW: Ghostlight
- Artist: Fukahire
- Composers: Lantis; WILL
- Platforms: PlayStation 4, Windows
- Release: PlayStation 4: JP: October 2, 2014; NA: April 28, 2015; PAL: May 1, 2015; Windows: WW: December 15, 2017
- Genres: Simulation, role-playing
- Mode: Single-player

Omega Quintet (オメガクインテット, Omega Kuintetto) is a video game developed by Galapagos RPG, a subsidiary of Compile Heart, for the PlayStation 4. A hybrid between an idol simulation game and a role-playing video game, the player plays as Takuto, the manager of the Verse Maidens, an idol group that use the power of song and dance to fight off a phenomenon called the "Blare" and save the world. Omega Quintet is the first game by Compile Heart for the PlayStation 4, and also the first retail game for the PS4 to utilize PlayStation Move. An English version of the game, available in both digital and retail format, was announced, and was released on April 28, 2015 in the United States and in Europe and Australia on 1 May 2015. A Windows version, produced and published by Ghostlight, was released on December 15, 2017.

== Plot and gameplay ==
Omega Quintet takes place in a world that is being damaged by a phenomenon known as the “Beep” ("Blare" in the English version), which has been degenerating the life of humankind by affecting their minds. The game's prominent characters are the "Verse Maidens", an idol group with the power to fight off the Beep. These powers are used to fight the Beep and save mankind, by giving them hope and dreams. The members of the Verse Maidens are Otoha, Kyoka, Kanadeko, Nene, and Aria. Otoha is a new member of the Verse Maidens, who would prefer to sleep and goof off than work hard, constantly forces the other party members to go along with her ideas, insults her childhood friend frequently and doesn't like whenever someone disagrees with her. She is a perpetually positive, but can also be a little idiotic. She is still growing and can be prone to making clumsy mistakes. Kyoka has a strong sense of responsibility who does her job as a Verse Maiden while caring for others, and also has a hard time expressing feelings. Kanadeko has a reckless, tomboyish personality and an intellect similar to Otoha's (i.e. none) who often makes decisions without thinking, Nene is very timid and often nervous and weak-willed, who often shies away and hides behind Kanadeko, and Aria, who is the eldest member of the Verse Maidens, who is mysterious and tends to distance herself with her speech and behavior. Other characters include Takt, protagonist of Omega Quintet, described as a cynical guy who was forced and guilt-tripped into agreeing to work as the Verse Maidens' manager and bodyguard, Momoka, a veteran Verse Maiden, Ayumi, Momoka's manager, Shiori, Kyoka's coach, Godou, the leader of the neighbourhood watch, and Tomekichi, a fan of the Verse Maidens and the leader of one of the supporting fan groups.

The game features "costume destruction" in a manner similar to Senran Kagura, which happens when the girls get parts of their clothing torn off as a result of taking repeated damage from enemies. Another feature in the game is the "PVS (Promotion Video System)", which allows players to make their own dance video and custom live performances to their liking. This is done choosing over 150 dances for the characters. Omega Quintet lets players make light waves and effects using the PlayStation Move controller, and they can feature in the music video itself by using the PlayStation 4 camera. During the game's fights, its Voltage Gauge fills up when Takuto protects the idols when the player attacks the enemies. When it rises to a certain point, the player can activate Live Mode, which gives the idols bonuses. The player must also adjust the turn order successfully, as team attacks are formed if characters act one after each other.

== Development ==
Details for the game were first revealed in the May 6, 2014 issue of Famitsu. A teaser trailer for the game was later released, introducing the game's major characters, setting, and the phenomenon of the "Beep". A further teaser was shown in August, featuring a sample of the game's music, including the tracks "Inchoate Voice," "Eureka," "Move*Menter," "Manmaru marui," and "Complex: Crescent". The game's artwork is drawn by Fukahire, and its music produced by Lantis and WILL. In July, the Famitsu reported that the game's development was at around 60%, and that the final polygonal graphics would resemble illustrations. Limited editions of the game come with a special booklet, while pre-orders come with an original soundtrack CD. The game was initially scheduled to be released on September 18, 2014; it was later delayed by two weeks to October 2, 2014.

== Reception ==
Four Famitsu reviewers scored Omega Quintet 8, 7, 7 and 8 out of 10, for a total score of 30/40. Omega Quintet sold 9,365 copies during its first week on sale in Japan, placing 8th for all video game sales in that week. It has a score of 58% on Metacritic.

Reception

Aggregate score
Aggregator	Score
Metacritic	(PS4) 58/100

Review scores
Publication	Score
Destructoid	4/10
Famitsu	30/40
Push Square	5/10
RPGamer	2.5/5
The Guardian	3/5
