= Mado Monogatari: Fia and the Wondrous Academy =

2024 video game

- Developer: Sting
- Publishers: Compile Heart; Idea Factory International
- Series: Madou Monogatari
- Platforms: PlayStation 4, PlayStation 5, Nintendo Switch, Windows
- Release: PS4, PS5, Switch: JP: 28 November 2024; WW: 29 July 2025; Windows: WW: 26 Mar 2026
- Genre: Action role-playing

Mado Monogatari: Fia and the Wondrous Academy (Note: Japanese: 魔導物語 フィアと不思議な学校, Hepburn: Madō Monogatari Fia to Fushigi-na Gakkō) is a 2024 action role-playing game developed by Sting, and published by Compile Heart and Idea Factory International. It is a title in the Madō Monogatari series. The game follows a new protagonist, Fia, who makes a journey to the ancient magic academy to become a great mage herself.

Fia and the Wondrous Academy was first released in Japan on 28 November 2024 for the PlayStation 4, PlayStation 5 and Nintendo Switch. An international released followed in 2025. A Microsoft Windows version was released in March 2026.

== Gameplay ==
Mado Monogatari: Fia and the Wondrous Academy is an action role-playing game where the player controls Fia, who uses items and skills for battles. She can learn abilities via a skill tree system, with advanced abilities acquired by reading coursebooks and passing exams. The game supports a photo mode.

== Development and release ==
Mado Monogatari: Fia and the Wondrous Academy was developed by Sting in cooperation with D4 Enterprise, the current intellectual property holder of the Madō Monogatari series. Many former Compile staff were involved in the game's development, including Sting's president. Sega, which held rights to the Puyo Puyo spin-off series, allowed the developer to use Madō Monogatari characters present in Puyo Puyo.

Fia and the Wondrous Academy was announced in October 2023 during the publisher Compile Heart's transition to a new management structure. At the time, the game was tentatively known as Mado Monogatari 4. It was released in Japan for PlayStation 5, PlayStation 4, and Switch on 28 November 2024. Idea Factory International published the game in the West on 29 July 2025. A limited edition that contains exclusive content was sold with the standard edition. The game was released for Microsoft Windows on 26 March 2026 through Steam.

== Reception ==
Reception

Aggregate scores
Aggregator	Score
Metacritic	69/100
OpenCritic	52%

Review scores
Publication	Score
Famitsu	29/40
Hardcore Gamer	3/5
RPGamer	3/5
RPGFan	73/100
Shacknews	8/10
RPG Site	7/10
Siliconera	6/10

Mado Monogatari: Fia and the Wondrous Academy received "mixed or average" reviews according to review aggregator Metacritic. 52% of the critics recommended the game according to OpenCritic.

The graphical presentation received criticisms. Chris Penwell of Hardcore Gamer panned the lackluster animations in cutscenes. RPGFan compared the 3D character design to that of the PlayStation 3 games, calling it unimpressive.
