= Compile Heart =

Japanese video game company

- Native name: 株式会社コンパイルハート
- Romanized name: Kabushiki gaisha Konpairu Hāto
- Type: Subsidiary
- Industry: Video games
- Predecessor: Compile
- Founded: 2 June 2006; 20 years ago
- Headquarters: Tokyo, Japan
- Parent: Idea Factory
- Website: www.compileheart.com

Compile Heart (株式会社コンパイルハート, Kabushiki gaisha Konpairu Hāto) is a Japanese video game developer founded on June 2, 2006 as a subsidiary of Idea Factory. The company was formerly managed by Compile's former executive Masamitsu "Moo" Niitani, most well known as the creator of the Madou Monogatari and Puyo Puyo series, before his retirement in December 2012. Compile Heart is primarily known for its Hyperdimension Neptunia and Record of Agarest War brands.

== History ==
Compile Heart was founded in 2006 as a subsidiary of Idea Factory.

In 2010, the company acquired a licensing deal with D4 Enterprise (the copyright holder of most property rights under Compile) to create new video games based on franchises from the defunct developer. This does not affect the rights to the Puyo Puyo series which D4 does not own and remains the property of Sega.

== Games ==
Year	Title	System	Note	Ref.
2006	Astonishia Story	PlayStation Portable	Developed by Sonnori.	
2006	Vulcanus	PlayStation Portable	Developed by Zeppeto.	
2007	Rogue Hearts Dungeon	PlayStation 2		
2007	Black Cat: Kuroneko no Concerto	Nintendo DS		
2007	Octomania	Wii	Co-developed by Idea Factory and Hyper-Devbox Japan	
2007	Quiz & Variety SukuSuku Inufuku 2 Motto SukuSuku	PlayStation 2		
2007	Oni Zero -Sengoku Ransei Hyakkaryouran-	Nintendo DS		
2007	Megazone 23: Aoi Garland	PlayStation 3		
2007	Tanoshii Youchien Kotoba to Asobo!	Nintendo DS		
2007	Jigoku Shoujo: Akekazura	Nintendo DS		
2007	Record of Agarest War	PlayStation 3	Co-developed by Idea Factory and Red Entertainment	
2007	The Frogman Show: DS Datte, Shouganaijanai.	Nintendo DS		
2008	Puzzle Mate: Oekaki Mate	Nintendo DS		
2008	Puzzle Mate: Nanpure Mate	Nintendo DS		
2008	Puzzle Mate: Crossword Mate	Nintendo DS		
2008	Dungeon of Windaria	Nintendo DS		
2008	Gakkou no Kaidan DS	Nintendo DS		
2008	DS de Yomu Series: Tezuka Osamu Hi no Tori 1	Nintendo DS		
2008	DS de Yomu Series: Tezuka Osamu Hi no Tori 2	Nintendo DS		
2008	DS de Yomu Series: Tezuka Osamu Hi no Tori 3	Nintendo DS		
2008	DS Pico Series: Sanrio no Party Heikou! Oryouri - Oshiyare - Okaimono	Nintendo DS		
2008	Majin Tantei Nougami Neuro: Battle de Yo!	PlayStation 2		
2008	Gyakkyō Burai Kaiji: Death or Survival	Nintendo DS		
2008	Cross Edge	PlayStation 3	Co-developed by Idea Factory	
2008	Sugoro Chronicle	Wii		
2008	Record of Agarest War (Reappearance)	Xbox 360	Co-developed by Idea Factory and Red Entertainment	
2009	Record of Agarest War Zero	PlayStation 3	Co-developed by Red Entertainment	
2009	Rosario to Vampire Capu 2: Koi to Yume no Rhapsodia	PlayStation 2		
2009	Jigoku Shoujo: Mioyosuga	PlayStation 2		
2009	Cross Edge Dash	Xbox 360	Co-developed by Idea Factory	
2009	Touch Takoron (Note: Out of service.)	iOS		
2010	So-Ra-No-Wo-To Otome no Gojuusou	PlayStation Portable		
2010	Record of Agarest War Zero (Dawn of War)	Xbox 360	Co-developed by Red Entertainment	
2010	Hyperdimension Neptunia	PlayStation 3	Co-developed by Idea Factory, Gust Corporation and Nippon Ichi Software	
2010	Record of Agarest War 2	PlayStation 3	Co-developed by Idea Factory and Red Entertainment	
2010	DS-Pico Series: Sanrio Puro Land - Waku Waku Okaimono - Suteki na Oheya Otsukuri Masho	Nintendo DS		
2011	Hyperdimension Neptunia mk2	PlayStation 3	Co-developed by Idea Factory, Gust Corporation, Nippon Ichi Software and 5pb.	
2012	Touch, Shot! Love Application	PlayStation 3	Co-developed by Tamsoft	
2012	Mugen Souls	PlayStation 3	Co-developed by GCrest	
2012	Travel Adventures with Hello Kitty	Nintendo 3DS		
2012	Record of Agarest War: Marriage	PlayStation Portable		
2012	Neptunia Kisakae!	Android		
2012	Hyperdimension Neptunia Victory	PlayStation 3	Co-developed by Idea Factory	
2012	Kami Jigen Appli Neptune	iOS, Android		
2013	Monster Monpiece	PlayStation Vita		
2013	Neptunia Collection	iOS, Android	Distributed through GREE	
2013	Sorcery Saga: Curse of the Great Curry God	PlayStation Vita		
2013	Mugen Souls Z	PlayStation 3	Co-developed by GCrest	
2013	Hyperdimension Idol Neptunia PP	PlayStation Vita	Co-developed by Idea Factory and Tamsoft	
2013	Date A Live: Rinne Utopia	PlayStation 3	Co-developed by Sting Entertainment	
2013	Fairy Fencer F	PlayStation 3	Co-developed by Idea Factory	
2013	Hyperdimension Neptunia Re;Birth 1	PlayStation Vita	Co-developed by Idea Factory and Felistella	
2014	Record of Agarest War	Android, iOS	Co-developed and published by HyperDevbox Japan	
2014	Hyperdimension Neptunia Re;Birth 2: Sisters Generation	PlayStation Vita	Co-developed by Idea Factory and Felistella	
2014	Moero Chronicle	PlayStation Vita	Co-developed by ZeroDiv	
2014	Hyperdevotion Noire: Goddess Black Heart	PlayStation Vita	Co-developed by Idea Factory and Sting Entertainment	
2014	Date A Live: Arusu Install	PlayStation 3	Co-developed by Sting Entertainment	
2014	Hyperdimension Neptunia U: Action Unleashed	PlayStation Vita	Co-developed by Idea Factory and Tamsoft	
2014	Omega Quintet	PlayStation 4		
2014	Hyperdimension Neptunia Re;Birth 3: V Century	PlayStation Vita	Co-developed by Idea Factory and Felistella	
2015	Record of Agarest War Zero (Dawn of War)	iOS, Android	Co-developed and published by HyperDevbox Japan	
2015	Megadimension Neptunia VII	PlayStation 4	Co-developed by Idea Factory	
2015	Trillion: God of Destruction	PlayStation Vita		
2015	Date A Live Twin Edition: Rio Reincarnation	PlayStation Vita	Co-developed by Sting Entertainment	
2015	Moero Crystal	PlayStation Vita		
2015	MegaTagmension Blanc + Neptune VS Zombies	PlayStation Vita	Co-developed by Tamsoft	
2015	Fairy Fencer F: Advent Dark Force	PlayStation 4 Microsoft Windows		
2015	Superdimension Neptune vs Sega Hard Girls	PlayStation Vita	Co-developed by Felistella	
2015	MeiQ: Labyrinth of Death	PlayStation Vita		
2016	Dark Rose Valkyrie	PlayStation 4		
2016	Genkai Tokki: Seven Pirates	PlayStation Vita	Developed by Felistella	
2016	Monster Monpiece Naked	iOS, Android		
2016	Mary Skelter: Nightmares	PlayStation Vita		
2017	Cyberdimension Neptunia: 4 Goddesses Online	PlayStation 4		
2017	Gun Gun Pixies	PlayStation Vita, Nintendo Switch		
2017	NepNep☆Connect: Chaos Chample	PlayStation Vita		
2017	Megadimension Neptunia VIIR	PlayStation 4, PlayStation VR		
2017	Genkai Tokki: Castle Panzers	PlayStation 4	Developed by Felistella	
2017	Tokyo Clanpool	PlayStation Vita		
2017	Date A Live Rio Reincarnation HD	PlayStation 4, Microsoft Windows	Co-developed by Sting Entertainment	
2018	Death end re;Quest	PlayStation 4		
2018	Mary Skelter 2	PlayStation 4, Nintendo Switch		
2018	Super Neptunia RPG	PlayStation 4, Nintendo Switch	Co-developed by Artisan Studios	
2018	Dragon Star Varnir	PlayStation 4		
2019	Arc of Alchemist	PlayStation 4, Nintendo Switch		
2020	Azur Lane: Crosswave	PlayStation 4, Microsoft Windows, Nintendo Switch		
2020	Death end re;Quest 2	PlayStation 4		
2020	Neptunia Virtual Stars	PlayStation 4		
2020	Date a Live: Ren Dystopia	PlayStation 4		
2020	Mary Skelter Finale	PlayStation 4, Nintendo Switch		
2020	Neptunia ReVerse	PlayStation 5		
2021	Neptunia X Senran Kagura: Ninja Wars	PlayStation 4, Microsoft Windows, Nintendo Switch		
2022	Hyperdimension Neptunia: Sisters vs. Sisters	PlayStation 4, PlayStation 5, Nintendo Switch, Xbox One, Xbox Series X/S, Windows		
2022	Fairy Fencer F: Refrain Chord	PlayStation 4, Nintendo Switch, PlayStation 5		
2023	Dokapon Kingdom: Connect	Nintendo Switch	Developed by Sting.	
2023	Hyperdimension Neptunia: Game Maker R:Evolution	PlayStation 4, Nintendo Switch, PlayStation 5, Xbox Series X/S, Windows		
2024	Touhou Spell Carnival	PlayStation 4, Nintendo Switch, PlayStation 5	Developed by Sting	
2024	Death end re;Quest: Code Z	PlayStation 4, Nintendo Switch, PlayStation 5, Windows		
2024	Mado Monogatari: Fia and the Wondrous Academy	PlayStation 4, Nintendo Switch, PlayStation 5		
2025	Calamity Angels: Special Delivery	PlayStation 4, Nintendo Switch, PlayStation 5		
2025	Ariana and the Elder Codex	PlayStation 4, Nintendo Switch, PlayStation 5		
2025	Scar-Lead Salvation	PlayStation 4, PlayStation 5, Windows, Xbox Series X/S		
2026	Villion:Code	PlayStation 4, Nintendo Switch, PlayStation 5, Nintendo Switch 2		
2026	Hyperdimension Neptunia Unlimited ∞	PlayStation 4, Nintendo Switch, PlayStation 5, Nintendo Switch 2		

- CH Selection (Compile Heart Selection) is similar to "The Best" (JP) or "Greatest Hits" (US), but use specially for Compile Heart's games.

== Projects ==
Compile Heart has announced a project titled Galapagos RPG, that aims to create new RPGs with a Japanese style, aimed towards Japanese gamers. The first game from this project is a "Fantasy RPG" with a dark tone called Fairy Fencer F for the PlayStation 3 followed respectively by Omega Quintet, Fairy Fencer F: Advent Dark Force, Death end re;Quest, Dragon Star Varnir, Arc of Alchemist, and Death end re;Quest 2 for the PlayStation 4, Fairy Fencer F: Refrain Chord, and Death end re;Quest: Code Z for the PlayStation 5.
