= Record of Agarest War =

2007 video game

- European cover art of the PlayStation 3 version
- Developers: Idea Factory; Red Entertainment; Compile Heart; Laughing Jackal (PC); HyperDevbox (Android, iOS)
- Publishers: JP: Compile Heart; EU: Ghostlight; NA: Aksys Games; JP: HyperDevbox (Android, iOS)
- Director: Kenta Sugano
- Composer: Kenji Kaneko
- Platforms: PlayStation 3, Xbox 360, Microsoft Windows, Android, iOS, Nintendo Switch
- Release: PlayStation 3: JP: September 27, 2007; EU: October 30, 2009; Xbox 360: JP: November 27, 2008; NA: April 27, 2010; PlayStation 3 (PSN): NA: April 27, 2010; Microsoft Windows; Standard Edition: WW: October 3, 2013; Collector's Edition: WW: February 4, 2014; Microsoft Windows (GOG.com): WW: November 27, 2014; Android: WW: December 19, 2013; iOS: WW: May 14, 2014; Nintendo Switch: WW: March 9, 2023
- Genre: Tactical role-playing
- Mode: Single-player

Record of Agarest War (アガレスト戦記, Agaresuto Senki), known in Europe as Agarest: Generations of War, is a tactical role-playing game for PlayStation 3, Xbox 360 and Microsoft Windows. The game is a collaboration between Idea Factory, Red Entertainment and Compile Heart. An updated port of the game was released in Japan for the Xbox 360 on November 27, 2008. HyperDevbox Japan released an Android port on December 19, 2013, and an iOS port on May 16, 2014. A Nintendo Switch port was released on March 9, 2023.

== Gameplay ==
The story progresses through various points plotted on a map. By visiting each point, the player has to battle the creatures, complete a quest, visit a town or go through a conversation to advance through the storyline and open up more points.

Fighting plays out like a strategic RPG where each character has his/her own set of moves, but by moving each character to an appropriate square, you can chain characters together and pull off combos. After each round of combat, each character will regenerate AP and accumulate SP points. When enough SP points have been accumulated, characters can unleash special attacks.

The game includes dating sim elements through its "Soul Breed" system in which the player creates a new character by pursuing a relationship with a female character as the game's storyline extends for five generations, each one having a different male protagonist. For the first four generations the protagonist marries one among three of his female companions and their son becomes the protagonist of the following generation who inherits stats and abilities from his parents.

== Release ==
=== Europe ===
The game was localized in Europe as Agarest: Generations of War by Ghostlight. The company planned to publish a standard retail version and a collector's edition, both released on October 30, 2009 for PlayStation 3. Initially, the game was set to use a cover art featuring a realistic version of the protagonist; however, negative feedback led to the publisher changing the cover art for one more faithful to the original. The 32 packs of DLC were put on the European PlayStation Store by Ghostlight.

The game was later ported to PC, and made available on the Steam store in North America and Europe.

=== North America ===
Aksys Games released the game in North America under the title Record of Agarest War on April 29, 2010. The game was released as a download on the PlayStation Network, and on disc for the Xbox 360. It was available as a downloadable title on the Xbox 360. The game retains the original Japanese dialogue.

=== Xbox 360 version ===
A port known as Record of Agarest War: Reappearance was released exclusively for the Xbox 360 in Japan on November 27, 2008. The Xbox 360 port featured additional voice acting, and a gallery mode. New items and a new dungeon are available over Xbox Live as downloadable content.

== Prequel ==
A prequel to the game titled Record of Agarest War Zero was released in Japan on June 25, 2009, released in the United States on June 14, 2011, and in Europe on August 26, 2011.

== Sequels ==
Record of Agarest War 2 was released in Japan in 2010 and worldwide in 2012.

Record of Agarest War: Mariage was released in Japan in 2012 on PSP and worldwide in 2019 on PC.

== Reception ==
Reception

Aggregate score
Aggregator	Score
Metacritic	PS3: 67/100; X360: 71/100; PC: 45/100

Review score
Publication	Score
TouchArcade	4/5

IGN's Daemon Hatfield gave the PS3 version a 7.5/10, stating "If you're a fan of the genre, Agarest War will provide a very long adventure that spans generations."
