= Banquet for Fools =

Banquet For Fools
- Developers: Hannah and Joseph Games
- Platform: Microsoft Windows
- Release: 5 March 2026
- Genre: Role-playing
- Mode: Single-player

Banquet for Fools is a 2026 role-playing video game by independent developer Hannah and Joseph Games for Microsoft Windows. Upon release, it received positive reviews, with critics praising its open-ended design and departure from traditional role-playing mechanics.

== Gameplay ==
Gameplay screenshot

Banquet for Fools is a role-playing game set in an open world with beat 'em up combat. Players assume the role of one of four guards of a race of Vollings, sent to investigate the disappearance of farmers on a recently colonised island. The objective of the game is to complete quests with minimal guidance other than diegetic directions from dialogue, scrolls and maps. A journal menu is included with notes that can be manually written by the player. Combat is engaged in real time, with players controlling one character at a time, and other companions fighting automatically.

== Development ==
Banquet for Fools was developed by Hannah and Joseph Games, a two-person team. The character models were built and animated from claymation.

== Reception ==
Reception

Review scores
Publication	Score
PC Gamer (US)	85%
Slant	4.5/5

Several critics praised Banquet for Fools and considered it departed from the conventional design of role-playing games. Niv M. Sultan of Slant praised the "myriad forks and hidden paths" of its "transportive" world, also commending the "nuance and dynamism" of its combat. Describing the game's world as "memorably unique", Kerry Brunskill of PC Gamer considered it encouraged exploration and enjoyed the "scrappy, improvised feel" of combat, but critiqued the vagueness of its quest directions and puzzles as "frustrating".
