= Gun Gun Pixies =

2017 video game

- Developer: Shade
- Publishers: JP: Compile Heart; WW: PQube
- Producer: Norihisa Kochiwa
- Platforms: PlayStation Vita, Nintendo Switch, Windows
- Release: PlayStation Vita: JP: April 27, 2017; Nintendo Switch, Windows: PAL: September 6, 2019; NA: September 8, 2019; JP: September 26, 2019
- Genre: Third-person shooter

Gun Gun Pixies (Japanese: ガンガンピクシーズ) is a 2017 third-person shooter, platformer and visual novel video game published by Compile Heart, released for the PlayStation Vita in Japan followed by a global Nintendo Switch and Windows release in 2019. Consisting of elements of adventure and stealth, the player controls two tiny characters from outer space on a mission on planet Earth to study human behavior.

== Gameplay ==
Promotional gameplay screenshot

The world view is that of a small alien sneaking into a human girls' dormitory to observe their private lives, thus is set in a relatively large game environment. The player is able to look at the girls from a "doll-sized perspective" at various angles. There are various goals in the gameplay such as collecting coins while avoiding being seen by the human girls; when the player fails to find the necessary information for the mission, they will be tasked to shoot at the humans with "happy bullets", which raise the endorphin levels of the human victim, depending on each body part targeted. At the end of every chapter is a Maiden Suppression Battle.

== Plot and characters ==
Kame-pon and Bee-tan (known together as the "Pixie Team") are two military school dropouts from the fictional planet Pandemo who are sent to planet Earth to observe human behavior due to an existential crisis in Pandemonian society. Guided by commander Almars, the pair are tasked to stay at a communal dorm for six months to study how humans girls relate to one another and build friendships. Despite the setting and erotic undertones, the game's plot includes more serious issues that human beings deal with, such as eating disorders. The dorm residents are sisters Misa, Kira and Eri Torii, Amayo Sato, and Kakima Minami. Neptune and Noire from Compile Heart's Hyperdimension Neptunia franchise appear as guest characters.

== Release ==
The Nintendo Switch version was also released in a Day One Edition which included the game itself and a 57-page art book.

== Reception ==
Famitsu in Japan rated the PS Vita game 29 out of 40. The reviewers gave praise to the concept, setting and interaction between the main characters, but had common criticism regarding the camera in narrow spaces. On the other hand, its reception in the West on the Nintendo Switch was mediocre with a Metacritic aggregate score of 46/100; Cubed3 positively commented on the "cheerful graphics coupled with the wicked sense of humour" of the characters, as well as the more serious human issues that are mentioned in the plot, but admitted that the "fanservice will not appeal to all players". Conversely, PJ O'Reilly of Nintendo Life gave a negative review with a score of three out of 10, concluding that it is "a terrible third-person shooter, a clunky platformer and an incompetent visual novel".
