= Ecolibrium =

2012 video game

- Developer: StormBASIC Games
- Publisher: Sony Computer Entertainment
- Platform: PlayStation Vita
- Release: PAL: September 12, 2012; NA: February 12, 2013
- Genre: Simulation
- Mode: Single-player

Ecolibrium is a simulation video game developed by Spanish studio StormBASIC games and published by Sony Computer Entertainment for the PlayStation Vita. The player controls a virtual ecosystem in which to grow and care for flora and fauna by manipulating four variables - Water, Minerals, Vegetation, and Meat - in order to create a balanced ecosystem. The player gains and spends 'ecopoints' and also tackles a series of multi-stage challenges. Ecolibrium received "mixed or average" reviews, according to video game review aggregator Metacritic.
