= HTR High Tech Racing =

2010 racing video game

- Developer: QUByte Interactive
- Publisher: QUByte Interactive
- Platforms: Microsoft Windows, Android, iOS, Nintendo 3DS
- Release: Microsoft Windows/iOS; June 24, 2010; Android; December 1, 2011; Nintendo 3DS; August 2014; Steam; May 29, 2014; Mac; May 29, 2014
- Genre: Racing
- Mode: Single-player

HTR High Tech Racing is a video game by Brazilian studio QUByte Interactive for Microsoft Windows, Android, iOS, and soon Nintendo 3DS.

== Gameplay ==
The player can customize various aspects of the game, including their car and their track. There are 18 tracks in game with the option to download other tracks as well, including those developed by the community.

== Development ==
The game was released by its Brazilian developer, QUByte Interactive. The Android version of HTR High Tech Racing was first released for Google Play in December 2011.

== Sequel ==
An enhanced port/sequel, HTR+ Slot Car Simulation, was published by Austrian publisher Libredia for Microsoft Windows and macOS on May 29, 2014. The PS Vita version was published by QUByte Interactive on November 17, 2015.
