= Fairy Fencer F =

2013 video game

- Developer: Compile Heart
- Publishers: JP: Compile Heart; WW: NIS America (PS3); WW: Idea Factory International (Windows); Advent Dark Force: JP: Compile Heart; WW: Idea Factory International; EU: Ghostlight Interactive (Switch)
- Artists: Yoshitaka Amano; Tsunako
- Writer: Toshiki Inoue
- Composers: Kenji Kaneko; Nobuo Uematsu; Yoh Ohyama; Toshiki Katoh; Yosuke Kurokawa; Michio Okamiya
- Platforms: PlayStation 3 Windows; PlayStation 4 Nintendo Switch
- Release: PlayStation 3: JP: October 10, 2013; NA: September 16, 2014; EU: September 19, 2014; AU: September 25, 2014; Windows: WW: August 4, 2015; Advent Dark Force; PlayStation 4: JP: November 5, 2015; EU: July 29, 2016; NA: July 26, 2016; Windows: WW: February 14, 2017; Nintendo Switch: WW: January 17, 2019
- Genre: Role-playing
- Mode: Single-player

Fairy Fencer F is a 2013 fantasy role-playing game under Compile Heart's Galapagos RPG brand for the PlayStation 3 and Windows. The game uses a modified version of Hyperdimension Neptunia mk2's battle system. The Windows version was released on August 4, 2015.

An expanded version, titled Fairy Fencer F: Advent Dark Force, was released in Japan in 2015 for the PlayStation 4, and was released worldwide in 2016. It received ports for Windows and Nintendo Switch in 2017 and 2019, respectively.

A spin-off, Fairy Fencer F: Refrain Chord, was released in Japan for Nintendo Switch, PlayStation 4, and PlayStation 5 on September 15, 2022. On April 25, 2023, it received a worldwide release with an addition to Windows.

== Story ==
A long time ago there was a conflict between a goddess and an evil god. The two deities didn't fight directly, but created a large number of special weapons for others to use. Eventually, these powers sealed each other and the power vanished from the world. Fast forward to modern times where these leftover weapons are called "Furies" and warriors that wield them are "Fencers." Fury weapons are said to be incredibly powerful, so Fencers constantly scramble to acquire them. By a strange coincidence, two fencers, Fang and Tiara, get caught up in the struggle between the goddess and evil god.

== Release ==
Fairy Fencer F was released on October 10, 2013, in Japan with an English version being released in North America, Europe and Australia on September 16, 19, and 25, 2014. The localization and publishing was handled by NIS America. A port for Windows was made available worldwide on August 4, 2015.

A limited Collector's Edition was produced for the English release. In addition to the game, the Limited Edition featured a hardcover art book, a copy of the game's soundtrack, and a beanie, all packed in a collectible box. This edition retailed for $74.99, and sold out before the game came out. It was available exclusively on NIS's website.

It features Yoshitaka Amano as a concept artist, Nobuo Uematsu as a co-composer, Tsunako as a character designer, Toshiki Inoue as a screenwriter and the "Neptunia Team" as some of the development team.

On August 31, 2014, an expanded version, Fairy Fencer F: Advent Dark Force was announced during Sony's Tokyo Game Show Press Conference. It is scheduled for release on the PlayStation 4 in 2015. At the time, there were no international release announced. Amano, Uematsu (composer), Tsunako, and Inoue are all returning as well.

Fairy Fencer F: Advent Dark Force has English/Japanese audio as well as traditional Chinese subtitles. Fairy Fencer F: Advent Dark Force is an enhanced remaster of the original game for PlayStation 4, Windows and Nintendo Switch. It features extended fights, updated graphics, rebalancing, new story routes and character endings. The Switch version includes all of the new DLC of the PlayStation 4 version.

== Reception ==
Reception

Aggregate score
Aggregator	Score
Metacritic	PS3: 65/100; PC: 66/100; PS4: 71/100; NS: 66/100

Review scores
Publication	Score
Destructoid	(ADF) 7/10
Famitsu	33/40
IGN	7.3/10
Nintendo World Report	(ADF) 6/10

Fairy Fencer F received mixed or average reviews. The PlayStation 3 version received an aggregated score 65/100 on Metacritic based on 31 reviews. The Windows version received an aggregated score of 66/100 on Metacritic based on 9 reviews. The PS4 version of Fairy Fencer F: Advent Dark Force received an aggregated score of 71/100 on Metacritic based on 21 reviews.
