= Mary Skelter: Nightmares =

2016 video game

- Developers: Compile Heart; Idea Factory
- Publishers: JP: Compile Heart; NA/EU: Idea Factory; WW: Ghostlight (PC)
- Platforms: PlayStation Vita; Microsoft Windows; Nintendo Switch
- Release: PlayStation Vita: JP: October 13, 2016; NA: September 19, 2017; EU: September 22, 2017; Microsoft Windows: WW: July 19, 2018; Nintendo Switch: NA: October 22, 2019
- Genres: Role-playing, dungeon crawler
- Mode: Single-player

Mary Skelter: Nightmares (Note: Japanese: 神獄塔 メアリスケルター, Hepburn: Kangokutō Mearisukerutā) is a dungeon crawler role-playing video game for the PlayStation Vita, developed and published by Compile Heart and Idea Factory in collaboration with Dengeki Bunko under the brand name "DenPile". It was released on October 13, 2016 in Japan, September 19, 2017 in North America, and September 22, 2017 in Europe. It was followed by two games: its prequel, Mary Skelter 2, which included Nightmares as a bonus remake with a new "true ending" unlocked by clearing the second game's own true end, and its climax Mary Skelter Finale.

The series also spawned a short tie-in light novel series by Dengeki Bunko acting as immediate spoiler-free prequels to each respective game (excluding Finale's book), of which was translated and printed in english special editions of Finale for the west as a box set.

== Gameplay ==
The game is a first-person dungeon crawler role playing game where the player guides a party of Blood Maidens through living dungeons in order to reach each one's boss, the titular "Nightmares." When in battle within the dungeons, each Blood Maiden has a Blood Gauge that lets her enter Massacre mode in order to temporarily raise her stats and gain bonus skills. If their stress is left unchecked however, however, the Blood Gauge will cause the Blood Maidens to go into Blood Skelter and uncontrollably attack friend, foe and self alike.

== Plot ==
The main characters Jack and Alice escape from a jail cell with the help of a group of supernaturally powerful girls called Blood Maidens. The entire city has been absorbed by a malignant being known as the Jail, and it has been releasing hostile monsters called Marchens. Realizing he has the power to assist the Blood Maidens, Jack joins their forces in order to escape the Jail.

== Reception ==
Reception

Aggregate scores
Aggregator	Score
GameRankings	70.80%
Metacritic	76/100

Review scores
Publication	Score
Hardcore Gamer	3.5/5
Push Square	7/10
RPGamer	2.0/5

Mary Skelter: Nightmares received generally favorable reviews. It received an aggregated score of 70.80% on GameRankings based on 10 reviews and 76/100 on Metacritic based on 14 reviews.

Hardcore Gamer's Chris Shive gave the game a 3.5/5, saying that while the game, "won't blow anyone away", it was still "a well put together, enjoyable experience."
