= Moero Crystal =

2015 video game

- Japanese box art
- Developer: Compile Heart
- Publishers: JP: Compile Heart; AS: Sony Computer Entertainment; WW: Eastasiasoft
- Director: Makoto Kitano
- Producer: Norihisa Kochiwa
- Designer: Katsuyuki Hirano
- Series: Genkai Tokki
- Platforms: PlayStation Vita; Nintendo Switch
- Release: PlayStation Vita: JP: September 25, 2015; AS: 2016; Nintendo Switch: JP: September 5, 2019; WW: September 17, 2020
- Genre: Role-playing

Moero Crystal, full name Genkai Tokki Moero Crystal (限界凸起 モエロクリスタル, Genkai Tokki Moero Kurisutaru; Limit Break Moero Crystal), is a 2015 dungeon crawler role-playing video game developed by Compile Heart for the PlayStation Vita. It is the third game in the Genkai Tokki series, following Monster Monpiece and Moe Chronicle, and preceding Genkai Tokki: Seven Pirates. Like the other games, Moero Crystal places emphasis on ecchi and fanservice content, and follows protagonist and "lucky lecher" Zenox as he searches for monster girl bras in order to "save the world". The game was released on September 25, 2015 in Japan and in greater Asia with Chinese subtitles in 2016. The game was released as Moero Crystal H (限界凸起 モエロクリスタル Ｈ) for the Nintendo Switch on September 5, 2019 in Japan and worldwide in September 2020.

== Gameplay ==
Moero Crystal is the direct sequel to 2014's Moe Chronicle, and contains the same ecchi-focused gameplay as its predecessor. Whereas in Chronicle players were on a journey searching for panties, in Crystal, they search for bras. Crystal also expands on the previous gameplay, with its "build up, release, and insert" battle system featuring a new "Insert" command, allowing players to change the characters' attacking order. During battles, the player will also get to help the monster girls by providing them with buffs as support. This is as the protagonist, Zenox, cannot attack and can only utilize support abilities. A team of five monster girls is required for battle. Buffs and bonuses can be utilized and the girls' costumes degrade over time. Upon defeating a monster girl, players can recruit them through the game's touchscreen "scratching" feature; a new "Double Scratch" mode allows players to "massage" and interact with up to two monster girls at a time.

50 monster girls from the previous game reappear, as well as 30 additional new ones. Crystal also features different endings specific to different monster girls, with each of the 80 girls having a separate ending. Upon meeting certain prerequisites, it is possible to go inside the heart of a specific monster girl in a dungeon called the "Depths Domain"; clearing it unlocks a variety of different things for the said character. Unlike Moero Chronicle, where character costumes of bras and panties came in a set, Crystal allows players to mix and match thus creating different costume combinations. Additionally, players can visit monster girls to gift them presents, as well as visit the in-game inn.

The game's story begins when the "Bra of Everlasting Darkness" and "Panties of Hope" are stolen, and a "Dimensional Chasm" appears in the skies. The world starts rising and pulls itself towards the rift. The protagonist is a "lucky lecher" named Zenox; Otton, a panty hunter and mascot of the series reappears from the previous games, and the game follows the characters as they search and gather monster girl bras in order to "save the world".

=== Characters ===
Main characters:

- Zenox (ゼノクス) (voiced by Yusuke Shirai), the protagonist of Moero Crystal, is nicknamed the "walking lucky pervert" and often finds himself in strange and unexpected situations with members of the opposite sex. Siliconera compared him to To Love Ru's Rito, except he is "actually capable of fighting."
- Luanna (ルアンナ) (voiced by Reina Ueda), the guardian of the great shrine that contained the "Bra of Perpetual Darkness". She is known to be oftentimes interested in the relationships between men and women.
- Lulucie (ルルシィ) (voiced by Asuka Nishi), a shrine maiden. She has the ability to be possessed by a goddess as well as the power to easily gain trust.

== Development and promotion ==
Moero Crystal was announced in May 2015 in an issue of Dengeki PlayStation. It is produced by Norihisa Kochiwa, directed by Makoto Kitano, and features character design by Katsuyuki Hirano. A website featuring character artwork and a short teaser trailer was released later that month. The game's official release date of September 25 was announced in June. A debut full-length trailer of Moero Chronicle highlighting the game's new features was released in July.

Sony Computer Entertainment Japan Asia announced in September that Moero Crystal will release in Asia with an English translation sometime in 2016, just like Moe Chronicle before it. Pre-orders of Moero Crystal include a special product code to download "Nude Flash" underwear of eight of the game's girl characters. A limited edition of the game is also available, featuring a special box illustrated by Katsuyuki Hirano, art book, and special CD containing the voices of the game's 80 monster girls.

== Reception ==
Four Famitsu reviewers all scored Moero Crystal 8 out of 10, for a total score of 32/40. The game sold 18,721 copies on its debut week, placing 7th for all software sales for that week according to Media Create.
