= Red Entertainment =

Japanese video game developer

Red Entertainment Corporation
- Native name: 株式会社レッド・エンタテインメント
- Romanized name: Kabushiki-gaisha Reddo Entateinmento
- Industry: Video games, animation, etc.
- Predecessor: Red Company (1976-2000)
- Founded: December 4, 2000
- Headquarters: Suitengu Hokushin Bldg. 1-39-5, Nihonbashi-kakigaracho, Chūō, Tokyo, Japan
- Key people: Ohji Hiroi
- Products: See product listing
- Revenue: ¥105,969,632 (capital)
- Owner: Oizumi Corporation
- Website: red-entertainment.co.jp/en/

Red Entertainment (Japanese: 株式会社レッド・エンタテインメント, Hepburn: Kabushiki-gaisha Reddo Entateinmento) is a video game developer and publisher based in Japan. Originally founded in 1976 as Red Company (レッドカンパニー, Reddo Kanpanī) (though it did not begin doing business until 1985), it was reorganized and succeeded by a new company on December 4, 2000, under its current moniker of Red Entertainment. While Red Company as a public corporation dates back to the mid-1980s, the first title released under the Red Entertainment brand was Gungrave on July 17, 2002. The name "RED" comes from "Royal Emperor Dragon". In 2011, the company was acquired by Chinese game developer UltiZen Games Limited. In 2014, Red Entertainment was sold to Oizumi Corporation.

== Partial game list ==
=== NEC ===
==== PC Engine ====
- Gate of Thunder
- Lords of Thunder
- PC-Genjin (Bonk) series
- Galaxy Fraulein Yuna series
  - Galaxy Fraulein Yuna (1992)
- Tengai Makyō (Far East of Eden) series

=== Nintendo ===
==== Super NES ====
- Chou Mahou Tairiku WOZZ
- Kabuki Rocks
- The Twisted Tales of Spike McFang
- Tengai Makyou Zero

==== GameCube ====
- Tengai Makyō II: Manjimaru (remake)

==== Wii ====
- Minon: Everyday Hero
- Sakura Wars: So Long, My Love

==== Nintendo DS ====
- Dramatic Dungeon Sakura Wars: Kimi Aru ga Tame
- Project Hacker
- Tengai Makyō II: Manjimaru (REMAKE)
- Tsunde Tsumi Kiss
- Tsumiki: Block Drop Mania
- Fossil Fighters
- Nostalgia
- Fossil Fighters: Champions
- Kenka Bancho Otome- Girl Beats Boys
- Fossil Fighters: Frontier

=== Sony ===
==== PlayStation ====
- Galaxy Fraulein Yuna 3: Final Edition
- Legend of Himiko
- Mitsumete Knight
- Thousand Arms

==== PlayStation 2 ====
- Blood Will Tell
- Bujingai
- Gungrave
- Gungrave: Overdose (publisher)
- Kidō Shinsengumi: Moeyo Ken
- Code of the Samurai
- Trigun: The Planet Gunsmoke
- Tengai Makyō II: Manjimaru (REMAKE)
- Kita e: Diamond Dust + Kiss is Beginning
- Sakura Wars: So Long, My Love
- Sakura Taisen ~Atsuki Chishio ni~
- Scared Rider Xechs

==== PlayStation Portable ====
- Record of Agarest War: Mariage (Agarest Senki: Mariage)
- Tengai Makyō: Daiyon no Mokushiroku
- Jyusaengi Engetsu Sangokuden

==== PlayStation 3 ====
- Record of Agarest War (Agarest Senki)
- Record of Agarest War Zero (Agarest Senki Zero)
- Record of Agarest War 2 (Agarest Senki 2)

==== PlayStation 4 ====
- Gungrave: G.O.R.E. (publisher)

=== Microsoft ===
==== Xbox ====
- N.U.D.E.@ Natural Ultimate Digital Experiment

==== Xbox 360 ====
- Record of Agarest War (Agarest Senki: Re-appearance)
- Record of Agarest War Zero (Agarest Senki Zero: Dawn of War)
- Record of Agarest War (Agaresuto Senki)

=== Sega ===
- Sakura Wars (Sakura Taisen) series

==== Sega CD ====
- Lords of Thunder

==== 32X ====
- Tempo

==== Game Gear ====
- Tempo Jr.

==== Sega Saturn ====
- Galaxy Fraulein Yuna Remix
- Galaxy Fraulein Yuna 3
- Sakura Taisen
- Sakura Taisen 2 ~Kimi, Shinitamou koto Nakare~
- Sakura Taisen Teigeki Graph
- Super Tempo
- Tengai Makyō: Daiyon no Mokushiroku

==== Dreamcast ====
- Sakura Taisen 3 ~Pari wa Moeteiru ka~
- Sakura Taisen 4 ~Koi Seyo, Otome~

=== With PQube ===
==== PlayStation 4, Nintendo Switch, Steam ====
- Our World Is Ended.

=== PC ===
- Sakura Taisen Taishou Roman Gakuentan (Browser game)
- Tengai Makyou JIPANG7 (Browser game)
