= List of Hyperdimension Neptunia characters =

Hyperdimension Neptunia is a video game series developed by Idea Factory and Compile Heart that features a wide array of fictional characters originally created by Naoko Mizuno and designed by Tsunako and Minamitsu. The original game centers around Neptune, one of four goddesses who adventures in a world where she can recruit other characters to form a party. Some of the supporting characters are playable depending on the title and also whether it is a remake or an option as downloadable content. Some characters also start as antagonists, and there are a regular set of villains. Most characters are based on and named after the video game consoles, video game developer companies or publishers. The characters have been commented on by game reviewers who had mixed feelings about their designs, personalities and voice acting.

== Conception and development ==
Naoko Mizuno, the creator of the Hyperdimension Neptunia series described the origins of the game and its characters: "First and foremost, I realized there were no games on the market that actually dealt with or parodied the game industry itself. The second thing is that, at the time, characters that changed—that took on different forms—were really popular, but there were none that were cute girls." She developed Neptune as a parody of the game industry with the fictional scenario where Sega was still attempting to reach the top of the console business. In looking back at the games, Mizuno said that she would have liked to have had the characters fully voiced, but that the editing in of new scenes and content made that impossible.

Executive producer Norihisa Kochiwa said that character designer Tsunako had developed some designs but had run into complications. The company considered partnering with another company but it did not work out. At the end of 2009, Tsunako had changed up the character designs and color scheme so they fit within the world's setting. Kochiwa said "Had that collaboration been realized then Neptunia would have never been born." Director Shingo Onodera said that "the game was originally supposed to be about 3 princess sisters and a main character. I came in right around when that project was halted and turned into Neptunia."

Mizuno created a new group of main characters for Mk2 in response to the moe subculture trend, especially the concept of the younger sister. "The younger sister characters, like Nepgear, are still inexperienced, and not fully grown compared to their older sisters. One of the reasons behind creating such heroines was that I wanted to depict the younger sisters' adorable efforts to grow strong and mature enough to save their older sisters and Gamindustri." She also noted there are no male main characters in the series: "I say this because I know; I'm a woman myself. It's so much fun to have private girl talks and have some girl time without boys around."

The character design was done by Tsunako, with another designer named Minamitsu joining the team starting with Victory. Minamitsu had been working on some other otome games, but regards Victory as her first major title. Kochiwa has remarked that working on Neptunia not only from the art and game system aspects, has affected Compile Heart's other titles. Tsunako said Victory was a turning point for the franchise as it helped solidify the relationships among the sisters.

The anime adaptation contributed to the Neptunia character design and development as it presented the characters from a different perspective. Tsunako said "the animators did a great job so as a designer I feel like I was able to learn from them as well." Onodera said "Being able to observe and learn how people from a different industry handled things like direction, script-writing, building tension, plus visualizing characters and their personalities helped me to see what was lacking in the original Neptunia." Onodera also credits the anime and Mk2 for inspiring them to do the Re;Birth versions.

In deciding what maker characters to include, the team worked with Compile Heart and their relations with other companies. The inclusion of Tekken allowed for more characters to cross over from other franchises such as Millionaire Arthur and God Eater.

== Main protagonists ==
The main protagonists are goddesses that represent consoles or portable hardware brands in the video game industry. Their normal interacting form is that of a girl, but during combat, they can transform into a more powerful "HDD Mode" of themselves.

=== Four CPUs ===
The Console Patron Unit (CPU) is a goddess character in the world of Gamindustri, each of whom is named after a video game system and is charge of a domain. Director Shingo Onodera said that in creating the scenario for the first game, the three goddesses had lacked something in their personalities so they gave each of them a gimmick.

Neptune (ネプテューヌ, Neputyūnu) a.k.a. Purple Heart
Voiced by: Rie Tanaka (Japanese); Melissa Fahn (English)
The primary playable character in most of the video game titles in the franchise, Neptune is the goddess of Planeptune, and is named after and represents the cancelled Sega Neptune. She has short purple hair, purple eyes, and cross-shaped hair clips that resemble the directional keypad of the console controller. In her NIS America profile, she is described as energetic and optimistic, but "tends to drag others into her problems without realizing it." However, her personality changes once she transforms into Purple Heart, taking on a much more serious and mature character with long purple hair styled in two braids, blue eyes, and a black one-piece swimsuit. In Mk2 her youthful appearance and personality in contrast to her younger sister Nepgear have strangers confusing her as the little sister.
In the first game, she is banished to the mortal world and loses her memory, and thus assembles a team of girls to fight monsters in Gamindustri. In Mk2 (and Re;Birth2), she is a supporting character who is held captive in the Gameindustri Graveyard while the player assumes her sister Nepgear's role in rescuing her. She returns to being the starter playable character in Hyperdimension Neptunia Victory where she is sent to the alternate V dimension. In MegaTagmension Blanc, she and Blanc collaborate in making a zombie film. In Neptune vs Sega Hard Girls, she is at war with Saturn (from Sega Hard Girls) when the history suddenly changes and her spirit then possesses IF's motorcycle.
Neptunia creator Mizuno said that Neptune is her favorite character from the series because she is "energetic and bright to the point of idiocy". Mizuno also liked her jumping action catchphrase "Like a kangaroo!" from the Victory title.

Noire (ノワール, Nowāru) a.k.a. Black Heart
Voiced by: Asami Imai (Japanese); Erin Fitzgerald (2011–2016), Erica Mendez (2017–present) (Note: Erin Fitzgerald tweeted that she no longer voices Noire as of Cyberdimension Neptunia: 4 Goddesses Online due to her stance of having games on SAG contracts. Erica Mendez is chosen as a new voice actress to Noire.) (English)
The goddess of Lastation, she represents the PlayStation 3. She has red eyes and long black hair styled in twin tails. According to game director Shingo Onodera, Noire's original color scheme was red, but was then changed to black. Her NIS America profile describes her as hardworking, polite, an "ideal goddess", but that she tries too hard sometimes, "cares a lot about what others think of her and seems to harbor many secrets about herself." Director Shingo Onodera said that Noire was given a gimmick of being a cosplayer. Onodera also noted Noire's remark to herself of not having any friends to form a band had resulted in being painted as the friendless character. As her transformed character Black Heart, she has long white hair, blue eyes, and a black suit. In the original game, she does not get involved in the story until the end of the game, however, in Re;Birth1 she becomes a playable character. She is described as competitive, tough, and aggressive, and is sometimes involved as an opponent to the party in the game. In Mk2 she is described as righteous but not the most flexible person, and a bit of a tsundere towards her sister Uni. In Victory, she appears in the V dimension, but has not become a CPU. She also has a friend named Plutia. In her transformed state though, she likes her newfound freedom and acts troublesome and uninhibited.: Within the "V dimension" of Victory, her appearance resembles of the original PlayStation.
In 2011, Noire won Compile Heart's Neptunia character popularity poll, and became the starring character of a spin-off game. In Hyperdevotion Noire: Goddess Black Heart, she and the other goddesses are presented in chibi style and interact with new characters in a world called Gamarket.

Blanc (ブラン, Buran) a.k.a. White Heart
Voiced by: Kana Asumi (Japanese); Wendee Lee (English)
The goddess of Lowee, she represents the Wii. She has short, light brown hair, and is described as shy and bottles her emotions, occasionally leading to violent outbursts. According to game director Shingo Onodera, Blanc's original color scheme was blue, and was then changed to white. As White Heart, she has long light blue hair in long sideburns, and a white suit. In that form, she is also quiet and inexpressive. Onodera gave Blanc a hobby of being an avid reader. Onodera had planned for Blanc to be the lonely character but reception to Noire's remark to herself about not having friends changed that direction. In the first game, she dislikes Neptune, and she does not get involved in the story until the end of the game, however, in Re;Birth1 she becomes a playable character. In Victory, Blanc appears in the alternate V dimension where she still has the same personality, and is still a CPU of Lowee, concerned about the developing nations of Lastation and Planeptune. However, her White Heart persona is angry and impulsive.
In 2014, Blanc was the winner of the second Neptunia character popularity poll. She is the starring character of MegaTagmension Blanc + Neptune VS Zombies. In that title, she and Neptune are making a zombie movie.

Vert (ベール, Bēru) a.k.a. Green Heart
Voiced by: Rina Sato (Japanese); Tara Platt (2011–2015), Carrie Keranen (2016–present) (English)
The goddess of Leanbox, she represents the Xbox. In her human form, she has long blond hair, blue eyes, and a polite, feminine personality. She is popular among her people, but is a hardcore gamer whose playing sometimes interferes with her duties. As Green Heart, she has long, light green hair styled in a ponytail, soft speech, and a laid-back attitude. In the first game, she considers Neptune her nemesis. In the original game, she does not get involved in the story until the end of the game, however, in Re;Birth1 she becomes a playable character. In Mk2 it is revealed she does not have a younger sister, and acts more maternal around the other CPUs. In Victory, she appears in the alternate V dimension, where she tries to invade the other continents while they are fighting each other. She is also more proud of her breast size. Her transformation persona Green Heart in this title is more mature than her character in the other games.

=== CPU Candidates ===
Each of the nations in Hyperdimension Neptunia mk2 has representatives of the goddesses called CPU Candidates, which turn out to be their younger sisters. Their item counterparts are portable handhelds in contrast to the home console references of the goddesses. Of the goddesses, Vert does not have a younger sister, while Blanc has two younger sisters.

Nepgear (ネプギア, Nepugia) a.k.a. Purple Sister
Voiced by: Yui Horie (Japanese); Christine Marie Cabanos (English)
The main character in Hyperdimension Neptunia mk2, she is the younger sister of Neptune. She has light purple hair, and wears a white sailor uniform with purple trim and a yellow kerchief, and a single cross-shaped hairpiece. She is described as very well-behaved and studious, in contrast to her sister who is energetic and compulsive. She transforms to Purple Sister where she wears a purple and black bikini with similar stockings (pre-Hyperdimension Neptunia Victory). She represents the Sega Game Gear. In Mk2, IF and Compa free Nepgear and they form the main adventuring party to rescue her sister from the Gamindustri Graveyard and save the world from the ASIC organization.
In Victory she follows her sister Neptune to the V/Ultra Dimension, but as she is not the main character anymore, she feels like she is a punching bag and put down by the others (as well as the game in some cutscenes). As Purple Sister, she has long purple hair and a white one-piece swimsuit-styled uniform.
Uni (ユニ, Yuni) a.k.a. Black Sister
Voiced by: Eri Kitamura (Japanese); Sarah Anne Williams (English)
Noire's little sister from Lastation. She has red eyes and has black hair styled in twin tails and black bows. Her black dress has a pleated bottom like a cheerleader outfit, mostly black with a band of light blue trim. She aspires to be like her sister, and is described as very diligent but insecure. She is also described as a tsundere-in-training. As the transformed Black Sister, she has green eyes and white hair styled in twin drills, and she wears a black bikini with long black stockings. Her name is based on the Universal Media Disc, a disc used for her console counterpart, the PlayStation Portable.
Rom (ロム, Romu) a.k.a. White Sister
Voiced by: Yui Ogura (Japanese); Carrie Keranen (English)
Also debuting in Mk2, she is the older of Blanc's two younger sisters. She has short brown hair, blue eyes, and dresses mainly in a light blue and white winter coat and hat with a pink bowtie and purse. Her name is based on Read-only memory (ROM) and her portable video game counterpart is the Nintendo DS which has twin screens. She is wary of strangers, soft spoken and quiet compared to her twin sister. Prior to her adventures in Mk2, she had never stepped outside of Lowee. When transformed into a White Sister, she wears a pink and white uniform, has pink eyes, and has blue hair that is longer on her right side.
Ram (ラム, Ramu) a.k.a. White Sister
Voiced by: Kaori Ishihara (Japanese); Shelby Lindley (English)
First appearing in Mk2, she is the younger and more dominant of Blanc's two younger sisters. She has long brown hair, blue eyes, and dresses mainly in a light pink and white winter coat and hat, with a blue bowtie and purse. She is talkative and sometimes rowdy. Her name is based on Random-access memory (RAM) and her portable video game counterpart is also the Nintendo DS. She transforms into White Sister as well, with light blue eyes and sporting pink hair in an asymmetrical bob with the left side being longer, and the same uniform as her sister but mirror imaged.

=== Other CPUs ===
Plutia (プルルート, Pururūto; also "Pururut") a.k.a. Iris Heart
Voiced by: Kana Hanazawa (Japanese); Cherami Leigh (English)
She first appears in Hyperdimension Neptunia Victory and is the second main character in that title alongside Neptune. In the V dimension she is the goddess of Planeptune. She has purple hair styled in a single long braided ponytail and light purple eyes. She wears a light aquamarine and white dress with gold trim. She is laid-back and often ignores her duties as CPU. She likes to take naps and make dolls. When she transforms into Iris Heart, she has long purple hair and red eyes, and is nicknamed Sadie for her sadistic and cold personality. She is based on the Sega Pluto, that – like the Neptune – remained at the prototype level.
Plutia has a role in MegaTagmension Blanc + Neptune VS Zombies where she swings around a plush doll and when transformed, uses whip swords.
Peashy (ピーシェ, Pīshe; also "Pish") a.k.a. Yellow Heart
Voiced by: Aoi Yūki (Japanese); Sandy Fox (games), Tia Ballard (anime) (English)
She is introduced as an infant in Victory residing in the V dimension where she is under Basilicom's day care in Planeptune along with IF and Compa. She gets along with Neptune because of their mutual dumbness. She is abducted by the Seven Sages but is able to escape from Rei Ryghts after stealing an unknown artifact from her and returns home, though Anonydeath soon brainwashes her into thinking he is her biological father. In the second half of the game she becomes Yellow Heart, a CPU for Eden, where her memories are altered and body reconstructed. In her transformed appearance, she has shoulder-length blonde hair, orange eyes, and a black and white battle suit. After Yellow Heart is defeated, Neptune is able to bring her back as Peashy, who then joins the party. As older child Peashy, she has blonde hair, a yellow and black striped jacket, black shorts, and red sneakers. She is based on the NEC's PC Engine.
Peashy also participates in MegaTagmension Blanc where Onodera said "she steps small but hits big."

== Supporting characters ==
Compa (コンパ, Kompa)
Voiced by: Kanako Sakai (Japanese); Cristina Vee (English)
Compa is a nurse-in-training who joins Neptune's party in the first game. She enjoys saving people, but is described as oblivious to her surroundings. She has light orange hair and wears a white sweater and a hairband with Pac-Man on it. She gets along well with Neptune. Her name is based from Compile Heart, one of the two major companies who developed the game. Her weapon in the game is a giant syringe that acts as a sword and gun. In Mk2 she and IF rescue Nepgear to form the starting party.
In Victory she appears as a child in the V dimension for the first half of the game, where she is in the daycare of Basilicom in Planeptune with IF and Peashy. Following a time skip, she is a teenager in the second half of the game.
IF (アイエフ, Aiefu)
Voiced by: Kana Ueda (Japanese); Megan Shipman (anime) (English)
A Guild member who joins Neptune and Compa as a core playable character in the first game. She has brown hair, green eyes, and a hair accessory made of two light green leaves. She wears a blue jacket over black clothes that sport the IF logo. Her NIS America profile describes her as being well-travelled, knowledgeable, calm, but selfish and hard-headed. In Mk2, her profile describes her as having decent social skills and realistic expectations, never getting to rest because of her companions getting into trouble. Her nickname is "Iffy" In Mk2 she and Compa rescue Nepgear to form the starting party. She also likes fiddling with her cell phones. Her name is derived from the initials for Idea Factory, one of the two primary developers of the game.
In Victory, she appears in the V dimension as a five year old in Basilicom's day care in Planeptune. Following a time skip, she is a teenager in the second half of the game.
IF has a major role in Neptune vs. Sega Hard Girls where she travels to the past where Neptune is fighting Saturn and then history changes and results in IF's motorcycle being possessed by Neptune.
Gust (がすと, Gasuto)
Voiced by: Natsuko Kuwatani (Japanese); Cassandra Lee Morris (English)
A young girl alchemist who crafts and sells items in the game. She wears a blue dress with a front pocket of items, and white hat shaped like a rabbit head with floppy ears. Her NIS America profile describes her as "fragile and makes you want to give her a warm hug." She loves money and is described as a cutthroat entrepreneur. Her name is based on Gust Corporation,
Gust reprises her role in Mk2. Gust was removed from Re;Birth1 title.
Nisa
Voiced by: Kaori Mizuhashi
A self-proclaimed "Keeper of Justice" (also "Heroine of Justice"), Nisa is training to become a hero, although she is described by her website profile as "not very good at gathering information". She has large blue hair and sports a red scarf. Her hair is tied back into a ponytail with a hair clip resembling the NIS logo. A running gag about Nisa is that she is flat-chested. Her corporate counterpart is Nippon Ichi Software and NIS America, the distributing company of the game.
Nisa has a major role in the PS3 version of Hyperdimension Neptunia, but was not present in the Re;birth1 remake. She appears early on in Mk2.
5pb.
Voiced by: nao (Japanese); Caitlin Glass (anime) (English)
A pop idol from Leanbox that appears in Mk2. She has long, blue hair and pink eyes. She wears headphones with antennae, a black top, arm bands, and a necklace with the 5pb. logo. She is energetic on stage, but very shy offstage. She represents the music company of the same name.
5pb was one of the characters that was removed in the remake Re;Birth1

Cave (ケイブ, Keibu)
Voiced by: Mayuko Takahashi
First appearing in Mk2, Cave is a sniper from the Security and Defense Organization, Leanbox Special Mission Department (Leanbox SMD). Her job is to defend Leanbox while the CPU is absent. She has red hair stylized in twin tails and black bows, green eyes, and wears a short white dress with red trim of which the torso resembles a corset. She has black with gold trim elbow and knee guards and white gloves and boots. She is regarded by others as stylish and adult, but she is self-conscious about her appearance and clothes. Her name is based on the company of the same name. In 2012, NIS America made Cave a playable character in Mk2 from purchasing her as downloadable content.
Falcom (ファルコム, Farukomu)
Voiced by: Akemi Kanda (Japanese); Xanthe Huynh (English)
First appearing in Mk2, she is an adventuress in Gameindustri who likes to meddle in others' affairs. She writes a novel series called A. Christin's Travel Records. She has short red hair and wears a grey headband. She wears a blue and white half jacket, mini-skirt, dark brown stockings, and boots, most of which have some gold trim. She carries around a violin case which holds a sword called Dragon Slayer. She represents Nihon Falcom. In 2012, NIS America made Falcom a playable character in Mk2 from purchasing her as downloadable content. Falcom was added to the Re;Birth1 title.
Red (REDちゃん, Reddo-chan)
Voiced by: Kanae Itō
Her name is directly derived from Red Entertainment. She is a young lesbian girl who constantly travels the world in search for wives, eventually running into IF and declaring her as first wife. Red was not present in mk2 as Mizuno wanted to introduce new characters such as Falcom and Cave but she was reintroduced in Re;Birth 2.
Ziege (ゼイゲ, Zeige; also "Setag")
Voiced by: Aya Endō (Japanese); Whitney Rodgers (English)
An anime-only character, she is Vert's technician. Her name is a play on Bill Gates (Ziege is Japanese pronunciation of Gates spelled backward in kana form). She has the verbal tic of adding "bill" ("biru" in the Japanese version) to the end of her sentences, and she has the Microsoft Windows logo attached to her hair.
MAGES. (メージス, Meijisu)
Voiced by: Kaori Furukawa (Japanese); Amanda Celine Miller (English)
A magician girl appearing in Hyperdimension Neptunia Victory and Hyperdimension Neptunia Re;Birth 1, who represents MAGES.
Broccoli (ブロッコリー, Burokkorī)
Voiced by: Miyuki Sawashiro
A little girl first appearing in Victory. In Re;Birth 1, she can join Neptune's party near the end of the game. She represents Broccoli.
CyberConnect2 (サイバーコネクトツー, Saibā Konekuto Tsū)
Voiced by: Masumi Asano
First appears in Victory. In Re;Birth 1, she is a friend of Financer, the chamberlain of Blanc. She can join Neptune's party in the later part of the game. She represents the CyberConnect2 video game developer.
MarvelousAQL (マーベラスAQLちゃん, MāberasuAQL-chan)
Voiced by: Hitomi Harada
Appears in Victory and Re;Birth 1. She represents Marvelous AQL.
Tekken (鉄拳)
Voiced by: Mikako Komatsu
She represents the video game franchise Tekken. Tekken does not appear in the original series but was added to Re;Birth1. She also appears in Victory. Director Shingo Onodera noted that their development team negotiated the hardest to include Tekken, and that it was one of their first "maker characters" (characters based on a video game maker instead of a platform or a company), and that it allowed them to secure other maker characters such as those in Millionaire Arthur and God Eater.

=== Oracles ===
Histoire
Voiced by: Mika Kanai (Japanese); Stephanie Sheh (English)
An advisor character who contacts Neptune telepathically and as a mysterious voice in the first game, providing the player with basic information on how to play the game as well as hints. Although her true form is that of a tome, she is able to transform into a fairy-like being once Neptune broke her seal.
In Mk2, she becomes the Oracle of Planeptune, serving as leader of Planeptune in Neptune's place. She then appears as a blonde-haired, blue-eyed fairy girl in a purple dress with blue and white trim for her wings, stockings, tie and cuffs.
In Victory, she appears in the V dimension as a little blond-haired girl with blue eyes. She wears a purple and white dress and has light purple wings. She likes to speak in emoticons. Because of her size, her processing speed is not as fast as her counterpart in the original dimension.
Kei Jinguji
Voiced by: Yūko Sanpei
Kei serves as the Oracle of Lastation, appearing mainly in Mk2. She has short, light-grey hair and wears black clothes and shorts with blue and white trim. She is described as a "clever, bold, and contract-oriented diplomat."

Mina Nishizawa
Voiced by: Asuka Nakaya
The Oracle of Lowee, appearing mainly in Mk2. She has long light blue hair and wears red rectangular-framed glasses, a red and gold robe, a short white dress, and a double-tasseled square academic cap. She watches over the Lowee twins Ram and Rom, and is described by NIS America's profile as competent yet clumsy.
Chika Hakozaki
Voiced by: Yuka Komatsu
Chika is the Oracle of Leanbox, appearing mainly in Mk2. She has long pale green hair, a brooch with the Xbox logo, red eyes, wears a black dress with green trim, and a large bow in her hair. Her NIS America profile describes her as sassy but sometimes appears sickly. She is obsessed with Vert and has claimed to be her sister.

== Antagonists ==
Arfoire
Voiced by: Chiaki Takahashi (Japanese); Laura Post (English)
Arfoire wants to defeat the four goddesses and take over Gamindustri. She wears black and purple gothic style clothes, along with a hat carrying a thorned rose, and has purple hair. She was formerly acquainted with Histoire, until Arfoire turned against her when they split Gamindustri into four parts. Her English localization name is based on the R4, a Nintendo DS flash card which allows the owner to play pirated game roms. In the Japanese version of the game her name is Magiquone (マジェコンヌ, Majekon'nu), which refers to magicom (マジコン; "magic computer"), a Japanese umbrella term for devices that enable piracy on game consoles.
In Re;Birth2: Sisters Generation, Arfoire has established herself as a deity, and there is an organization called Arfoire Syndicate of International Crime (ASIC).
In Victory, she is not the primary antagonist, but allies as a member of the Seven Sages in order to get rid of all CPUs. She wears a black witch hat and her wings aren't as prominent.
Underling
Voiced by: Junko Minagawa (Japanese); Morgan Berry (English)
Appearing in Mk2, she is a small girl with light green hair and pointy ears; she wears a grey open jacket with a hood that has round mouse ears, grey pants, and boots. She works on ASIC missions from flyer distribution to demolition operations. The Mk2 website mentions that she has a real name but no one bothers to call her by it. In the anime series, she is named Linda (リンダ, Rinda). She does not appear in Victory.
Warechu
Voiced by: Niko (Japanese); Sara Ragsdale (anime) (English)
Appearing in Mk2, he is a mouse monster with a jagged red/yellow heart symbol on his chest and a jagged black heart at the end of his tail. He is Arfoire's assistant and sometimes avoids getting assigned duties, which end up going to Underling. After he was treated by Compa, he develops a crush on her. Under NIS, Warechu was referred to as Pirachu. After NISA stopped localising the games, his name was changed to Warechu, matching the Japanese, as well as the name used in the Anime.
In Victory, he looks the same as with Mk2, and is a member of the Seven Sages. He likes to poke fun of Arfoire and Rei for being old.
Croire (クロワール, Kurowāru)
Voiced by: Mika Kanai (Japanese); Cristina Vee (English)
A fairy creature who first appears in Victory. She has short blonde hair, blue eyes, and has purple wings. She wears a purple and black cloak over a top and shorts. Croire is depicted as a rude and sadistic person that speaks in a brusque, vulgar tone and will openly mock and ridicule others, regardless of who they are. She likes to visit Rei to pick on her.
Anonydeath (アノネデス, Anonedesu)
Voiced by: Yuki Fujiwara (Japanese); David Vincent (English)
First appearing in Victory, Anonydeath is a member of the Seven Sages and the master hacker in charge of their intelligence network. He is typically seen in a multi-colored mechanical suit of mostly pink and purple colors with some light green, orange, and white. He originally joins the Seven Sages because he thought it would be fun. He works behind the scenes as he is not skilled at close combat. He behaves and talks in a feminine manner, thinking of himself as a little girl.
Rei Ryghts
Voiced by: Yū Kobayashi (Japanese); Morgan Garrett (anime) (English)
The leader of the Seven Sages and a former CPU of a now defunct nation. She is the main antagonist of Victory, and represents the Atari 2600. Rei seems to be the very sensitive, gentle type of character who somehow manages to handle being bullied, teased, and harassed on a daily basis very well. She tries to keep things in order, but she seems to be very pathetic, according to others. She has a lot of trouble speaking decently in front of people and lacks any actual powers. She has barely any confidence, possibly none at all, and is always fearful.
Originally taking the guise of an anti-goddess activist, she reveals herself as the final antagonist towards the end of the anime, being in reality the goddess of the former nation of Tari. Her plans to destroy the world are thwarted by the protagonists.

In the anime, her name is Rei Kiseijyo (キセイジョウ・レイ, Kiseijō Rei).

=== Four Felons ===
The Four Felons are members of the Arfoire Syndicate of International Crime (ASIC) who were created from the people's faith in the deity Arfoire. They debuted in Mk2. Each Felon is given the title CFW, which in the Japanese version stands for Custom firmware, which is an altered version of the original software inside a video game console. In the English version, CFW stands for Criminal of the Free World. Some of the Felons make appearances in the anime adaptation.

CFW Magic
Voiced by: Chiaki Takahashi
Magic is the leader of the Four Felons. She has pink hair styled in long twin tails, a bikini-like outfit that shows her pale skin, and pointy mechanical-appearing wings of orange, black, and pink. She also wears a patch over her right eye. She holds a blade in her right hand. At the beginning of the Mk2 story, she defeats and kidnaps the CPUs.
CFW Judge
Voiced by: Kenjiro Tsuda (Japanese); Kyle Hebert (English)
The merciless Guardian of the Gamindustri Graveyard. He is clad in black armor and wings with light blue trim, and wields a large axe. According to his NIS America profile, he was created by the hatred of game developers whose games did not sell as expected.
CFW Brave
Voiced by: Kenjiro Ito
A Felon that was created from the angst of children who could not afford to buy video games. He appears as a mecha with red and blue on its mostly silver-white body. His wings resemble those of planes, and on his chest is a gold dragon head. He is described as an honorable warrior.
CFW Trick
Voiced by: Yōji Ueda (Japanese); Jessie James Grelle (English)
Trick was created from the wrath of gamers who could not beat difficult games. He appears as a fat gold robot with green eyes, a tail, and a long red tongue that likes to lick young girls.

== Reception ==
Jack Devries of IGN described the characters as "Imagine the console wars between SEGA, Microsoft, Nintendo, and Sony, but an actual war, with each console personified by a big-breasted, scantily clad battle goddess." He wrote that the game has "some well done 3D character models, the dungeons they run around in are all dull, boring hallways." GameSpot in reviewing the first game, described the characters as "hypersexualized young girls", "key characters amount to little more than disturbing dolls wielding such weapons as a giant syringe," and regarding two of the characters IF and Compa "they're almost completely devoid of personality, existing only as depressing stereotypes of vapid, sexy cuteness." Simon Parkin of Eurogamer disliked the game's plain sexism and innuendo: the "characters make lewd comments with all the awkwardness of a children's TV presenter telling a dirty joke." Matthew Razak of Destructoid found the characters "devolve into no more than slightly veiled references to cultural gaming cliches.", and while the actual game was disappointing, he praised the voice acting, writing that despite having bad puns, the delivery was done well. Heidi Kemps of GamesRadar wrote that the main characters "come from the school of modern moe" and that the secondary characters were "just presented as generic blank silhouettes." Kallie Plagge of IGN, in reviewing Re;Birth1, found the game missed chances to use their characters to satirize the game industry and that the characters would repeatedly point out each other's obvious attributes such as tsundere.

In reviewing Mk2, Matthew Bennett, associate editor of Electronic Gaming Monthly critiqued Nepgear's character "Instead of four powerful and beautiful heroines we're left with one pre-pubescent girl who's suffering from a severe case of schizophrenia, never quite sure if she's saving the world, or writing a Dear Diary entry." and also the characters' 3D modeling, which "on paper sounds like a fantastic upgrade, but though offering more emotion, just look out of place against the 2D backgrounds."

Idea Factory business developer Damien Urvois, in promoting the Re;Birth version of Neptunia said that "Nowadays, the demand for moé is quite high overseas, so, we must quickly release the main titles." Executive producer Norihisa Kochiwa said "I think the reason why the series has lasted so long and is loved so much is due to the characters."
