= Kana Sakai =

Japanese voice actress in Japan (born 1986)

- さかい かな
- Born: 酒井 香奈子 (Kanako Sakai); November 11, 1986 (age 39); Fukuoka, Fukuoka, Japan
- Occupation: Voice actress
- Agent: freelance
- Notable credit: Rec as Aka Onda

Kanako Sakai (酒井 香奈子, Sakai Kanako) is a Japanese voice actress in Japan. She changed her stage name to Kana Sakai(さかい かな.Sakai kana) on her birthday, November 11, 2015. On May 1, 2019, she left her previous agency, Ogipro THE NEXT, and became a freelancer.

== Filmography ==
=== Anime ===
2006

- Binbō Shimai Monogatari: Shima Ōshiro
- Hell Girl: Two Mirrors: Kikuri
- Lovedol ~Lovely Idol~: Ruri Fujisawa
- Magikano: Chiaki Yoshikawa
- REC: Aka Onda

2007

- Kaze no Stigma: Ayumi Tsuwabuki
- Kisaragi: Kisaragi Miki

2008

- Hell Girl: Three Vessels: Kikuri

2009

- Miracle Train: Akari

2010

- Durarara!!

2013

- Hyperdimension Neptunia: The Animation: Compa
- Muromi-san: Harpy

=== Video games ===
- REC ☁EDokiDoki Seiyū Paradise ☁E: Aka Onda
- Ar Nosurge: Shurelia
- Ar tonelico: Melody of Elemia: Shurelia
- Ar tonelico II: Melody of Metafalica: Shurelia
- Hyperdevotion Noire: Goddess Black Heart: Compa
- Cross Edge: Shurelia
- Hyperdimension Neptunia: Compa
- Hyperdimension Neptunia Mk2: Compa
- Hyperdimension Neptunia Re;Birth1: Compa
- Hyperdimension Neptunia Re;Birth2: Sisters Generation: Compa
- Hyperdimension Neptunia Victory: Compa
- Megadimension Neptunia VII: Compa
- Memories Off: Yubikiri no Kioku: Lisa Caycy Foster

=== Drama CD ===
- REC Volume 1: Aka Onda
- REC Volume 2: Aka Onda
