= Megadimension Neptunia VII =

2015 video game

- North American cover art
- Developers: Idea Factory; Compile Heart
- Publishers: JP: Compile Heart; WW: Idea Factory International
- Artists: Tsunako; Manamitsu
- Composers: Kenji Kaneko; Yoshitaka Hiroda; Takeshi Toriumi; Tsutomu Narita; Chihiro Fujioka; Takeshi Abo; Nobuo Uematsu
- Series: Hyperdimension Neptunia
- Engine: PhyreEngine
- Platforms: PlayStation 4, Windows, Nintendo Switch
- Release: PlayStation 4: JP: April 23, 2015; NA: February 2, 2016; EU: February 12, 2016; Windows: WW: July 5, 2016; Nintendo Switch: JP: March 19, 2020; WW: July 28, 2020; VIIR; PlayStation 4: JP: August 24, 2017; NA: May 8, 2018; EU: May 11, 2018; Windows: WW: October 22, 2018
- Genre: Role-playing

Megadimension Neptunia VII is a 2015 role-playing game in the Hyperdimension Neptunia series by Idea Factory, released for PlayStation 4 and ported to Windows and later to Nintendo Switch. The sequel to Hyperdimension Neptunia Victory, it begins with Neptune and Nepgear being transported from the Hyper Dimension to the post-apocalyptic Zero Dimension, where they team up with local CPU Uzume Tennouboshi to defeat the giant Dark CPUs and return home. They eventually uncover a scheme that threatens both dimensions.

== Gameplay ==
The game features a new battle system with a different combo structure to previous games, although some similarities still exist. The gameplay places strong emphasis on the positioning of characters. Each goddess character has a "Next Form", which is an additional transformation phase on top of their existing goddess transformations; these forms cause changes to combat style, in addition to character personality changes. Battles are a four-member party "Unit Turn-based" system.

When it becomes the player's turn, they can select a character and move freely within the battlefield.

=== Guild ===
At the Guild within a city, the player can accept requests from various people as Quests. To complete a quest, one must fulfil the contents of the quest, then report back to the Guild. By completing quests, the player will receive items and Credits, as well as the shares of each nation increasing.

== Plot ==
The game is separated into three individual chapters with different stories for each dimension, each with a unique title:

=== Zero Dimension Neptunia Z: Twilight of the Desperate CPU ===
With the era of peace continuing throughout Gamindustri, Neptune, the ruling Console Patron Unit (CPU) and Nepgear, her sister and CPU Candidate of the nation of Planeptune are warned by their Oracle, Histoire, of the upcoming 'CPU Shift Period', where the public will attempt to oust their CPUs in favor of newcomers. Before they can prepare, Neptune and Nepgear stumble across an old video game console which transports them to the ruined, monster-infested Zero Dimension.

They find a survivor, Uzume Tennouboshi, who is also a CPU. The pair learn that, like Uzume, they are unable to transform to unlock their true powers in this world due to the absence of Shares (faith from the people). The trio journey to locate the Share Crystals to empower themselves enough to reclaim the land from the invading monsters.

Neptune and Nepgear learn that Uzume has unique abilities that may trigger when the party needs them most. She is also an amnesiac who remembers nothing of her people or the calamity which destroyed her world but believes it to be the work of giants known as Dark CPUs, with one of them, Dark Purple, actively wreaking havoc. Uzume's abilities grant the party Shares from friendly monsters and eventually the ability to seal Dark Purple in a pocket dimension; the Sharing Field.

Nepgear works on a device to send herself and Neptune home but the facility is attacked by Arfoire; a powerful CPU-like being with a lust for destruction. Neptune was transported home, but Nepgear jumped out to help save Uzume from Arfoire's forces. This led the two to abandon their post and retreat. Back home, Neptune finds Histoire incapacitated due to her overloading from linking dimensions to bring Neptune home. Soon, Neptune begins to restore Histoire, hoping she can bring Nepgear home.

Meanwhile, in the Zero Dimension, Nepgear and Uzume are intercepted by Arfoire. The two are saved by an alternate, older Neptune. The older Neptune reveals that she is a dimension traveler who comes from a Planeptune under the rule of Plutia (a close friend from the previous game, who rules in the Ultra Dimension) who came to the Zero Dimension with the power of Croire (a dimension-crossing antagonist, also from the previous game) after capturing her, though Croire has since escaped.

The party are unable to defeat Arfoire who has stolen power from Croire to boost her own, but recapture Croire. Arfoire frees Dark Purple from the pocket dimension and fuses with it, though the party are able to re-confine the fused deity, creating a cross-dimensional portal in the process. Neptune rejoins the party through the portal and aids the group in destroying the giant deity, though the portal's temperamental nature causes Neptune and Nepgear to return home after the battle. Uzume and her friend Umio plan to rebuild their world, though the older Neptune's fate is left uncertain.

=== Hyper Dimension Neptunia G: The Golden Leaders, Reconstructors of Gamindustri ===
Several days later, the CPUs hold a meeting to discuss the CPU Shift Period which is now in full effect. Shares are disappearing rapidly, and the CPUs will host a festival to regain public faith. A festival event is interrupted by a mysterious 4-person group known as Gold Third. They swiftly defeats the CPUs, and the world is engulfed in a white light.

The CPUs awaken several days later, only to find that the public have forgotten them and each of the four members of Gold Third now rule the four nations. The CPUs each return to their respective Basilicoms (CPU Headquarters) followed by the CPU candidates to assess each nation's situation. Though they attempt to keep in contact by cell-phone, networks prove unstable. Vicious new monsters have also been reported throughout Gamindustri, as well as four mysterious golden towers.

Neptune:

Neptune reunites with her old friend IF and joins her in investigating the new crime syndicate AffimaX. IF attempts to abandon Neptune having forgotten her entirely, though her memories return when Neptune rescues her from Arfoire, who has survived and escaped from the Zero Dimension. The two friends defeat Arfoire, however she is rescued by Steamax; a cyborg ninja from AffimaX. The two return to Planeptune as a handful of citizens regain their memories, including Neptune's other friend Compa. The three head to the Basilicom where Histoire welcomes them home and reveals that B-Sha from Gold Third is an even lazier leader than Neptune, and is also afraid of monsters.

Histoire suggests Neptune and B-Sha rule Planeptune together, with B-Sha policing the city and Neptune slaying the growing number of monsters outside. Later, the party capture and interrogate Warechu; an AffimaX thief and video-game pirate. In an effort to woo Compa, Warechu reveals the names of several AffimaX members, including himself, Arfoire, Steamax and their leader, the capitalist General Affimojas. Steamax infiltrates the Basilicom, frees Warechu and steals Neptune's dimension-crossing console. The party chase after and defeat Steamax, but are forced to join forces with him to stop a brainwashed Warechu and B-Sha who are attacking Planeptune, though Steamax escapes with the console after the battle.

Noire:

Noire returns to Lastation with her sister Uni only to find she is a wanted criminal. Noire is forced to leave Uni behind and is rescued by a girl named K-Sha. The two become best friends and K-Sha reveals Lastation's Gold Third leader resigned and a corrupt mercenary group called The Order is now in charge of Lastation. Noire tries to aid Lastation by defeating the new monsters but risks capture by being in the public eye. Eventually, Noire is tracked to K-Sha's location and K-Sha is interrogated to reveal Noire's whereabouts. Noire surrenders to save her friend, though Uni soon arrives and breaks Noire out of jail. The two return to K-Sha, who becomes increasingly jealous of Noire's close relationship with her sister.

Steamax meets Uni for the first time and takes a liking to her. After a mysterious voice persuades K-Sha to remove Uni from their relationship, K-Sha challenges Uni to a fight to the death at the golden tower, with Noire being the prize. At the tower, K-Sha reveals the truth that she is Lastation's Gold Third member and is also in love with Noire. Noire takes Uni's place in the dual to spare Uni and wins, sparing K-Sha, resulting in the two agreeing to be friends. Later, the tower is attacked by The Order, hoping to cut off K-Sha's power source; the crystal on the top floor. The three defeat the order but Uni is poisoned by a chemical weapon. K-Sha saves Uni's life by creating a vaccine from her own blood, but turns hostile again afterwards and is defeated once again. Realizing her power is driving her insane, K-Sha destroys the crystal herself and the three agree to try being friends again.

Blanc:

In Lowee, Blanc is rescued from a monster by C-Sha of Gold Third. C-Sha claims she has no memory of their prior battle and tells Blanc about the harsh class system in Lowee and the restrictive laws. Blanc joins C-Sha and becomes a hunter and helps the struggling citizens whilst searching the land for her sisters, Rom and Ram. C-Sha is approached by a politician named Azna=Leb and tasked with assassinating Blanc, but she refuses. After reuniting with Rom and Ram on a rescue mission, Blanc is approached by Azna=Leb and tasked with investigating C-Sha following troubling allegations against her. Blanc questions her friend and C-Sha apologetically reveals the truth, that she is the Gold Third leader of Lowee and is the source of the monster outbreak as her powers randomly release an uncontrollable mist which summons monsters against her will.

C-Sha is arrested by Azna=Leb's agents despite Blanc's protests of her innocence. C-Sha is sentenced to execution but releases the mist, summoning an army of monsters to attack Lowee, allowing her to escape with help from her friend Financier. Rom and Ram evacuate the citizens whilst Blanc attempts to stop the monsters alone. When all hope seems lost, Financier arrives with Rom, Ram, C-Sha and the Hunters Guild. After liberating Lowee, C-Sha reclaims her position of ruler and arrests Azna=Leb who she left in charge in her absence, and then abolishes the harsh laws and class system which he set in place. Afterwards, C-Sha climbs her golden tower and destroys the crystal at the top to remove her powers and the mist, but instead becomes possessed by the mist. After Blanc, Rom and Ram defeat her, the four return to their duties in Lowee.

Vert:

Vert, the CPU of Leanbox, returns home to learn from the new leader, S-Sha of Gold Third, that Leanbox is under attack by invaders and an army of demons. Vert immediately joins the military in order to save Leanbox and is sent to the front lines where she learns that Leanbox's entire army has been turned into pigs by a curse. After defeating an outside invader; a battle robot believed to be from Lastation, Vert is dispatched to defeat another invader but instead encounters Nepgear who offers her support. Together, the two defeat another battle robot which that was made from Lastation parts, but built within Leanbox.

The two return to S-Sha to suggest an internal rebellion but S-Sha cold-shoulders them. Later, Vert is contacted by a woman named E-Sha who begs her to stop S-Sha's scheme. S-Sha promises to return Leanbox to Vert after they defeat the demon king, but she disappears soon after the mission is accomplished. The party follow her to Leanbox's golden tower which is revealed to be the source of her power. The party battles through S-Sha's allies, including older Neptune who reveals she has joined AffimaX. E-Sha manifests as an alternate personality within S-Sha's body which S-Sha intends to create a new vessel for by sacrificing a million cursed Leanbox citizens. The ritual is secretly sabotaged by the older Neptune, and the party is able to convince S-Sha to live in harmony with E-Sha after defeating her.

Finale:

With the nations now at peace, Neptune journeys with IF and Compa to reunite the CPUs and plan their next move against AffimaX. The party infiltrate AffimaX's base of operations; an aerial fortress. AffimaX, however, is disbanded, as Affimojas refuses to hand the game console over to Arfoire, resulting in her leaving with older Neptune. Affimojas also dismisses Steamax having learned of his feelings for Uni, though Steamax stays behind to defend his oldest friend from the CPUs, but is inevitably defeated. Affimojas is able to fend off the CPUs but is then defeated by them when they transform into their 'Next Form'; a new power given to them by Gold Third.

=== Heart Dimension Neptunia H: Trilogy Finale: Into Legend ===
After returning to Planeptune with Affimojas and Steamax in tow, a wormhole opens above Gamindustri. The four CPUs explore the wormhole, followed from a distance by Nepgear and Uni. After noticing an incoming monster hoard which Neptune recognizes from Zero Dimension, she stops their advance by destroying the passageway. Suddenly, Uzume appears and summons Dark Purple, who then abducts the four CPUs. Nepgear and Uni return to Histoire to plan a rescue mission. Histoire reveals that the CPUs were taken to the Zero Dimension but the party should be able to follow by using the dimension-crossing console. After sparring with Nepgear, Uni, Ram, Rom, Compa and IF, the four members of Gold Third agree to join the rescue mission.

In Zero Dimension, the party interrogate Uzume who denies any knowledge of abducting the CPUs and joins the party to aid in the investigation. The party finds Uzume's doppelganger who reveals her plan to fuse the Zero Dimension and the Hyper Dimension by using her four golden towers as an anchor point, which would plunge the new world into ruin. She then escapes to a third dimension; Heart Dimension, by opening a portal. The party follow her through the portal where they find a fragmented world made from memories and dreams. Nepgear, Uni and Uzume leave the party to rest whilst they explore the area and rescue older Neptune from Arfoire, and destroy her once and for all.

Older Neptune reveals she was a double-agent who joined AffimaX to aid the party from the shadows by stopping S-Sha's ritual and leaving the doppelganger's portal open. The doppelganger, who older Neptune refers to a 'Kurome', ordered Arfoire to kill her after learning the truth. With older Neptune back in the party, the group explores Heart Dimension and learn that Kurome has the power to induce nightmares and false happiness, which she is using to corrupt the CPUs like she did previously to Affimojas and Gold Third. She also partially re-wrote the timeline to make the public forget, and thus weaken, the CPUs, but newly acquired Shares are cancelling its effects. The party witness the CPUs' fantasies, such as with Neptune wanting praise and her nation's happiness.

The party track down Kurome, who reveals she is a spirit of the real Uzume; an old CPU of Planeptune who volunteered to be sealed in Heart Dimension by Histoire after unintentionally harming her people having failed to control her powers. There, she came to resent humankind who shunned her and became a wandering spirit, whilst a fragment of her power; her conscience, took on a new life in the connected Zero Dimension, as the new Uzume. Kurome then unleashes the corrupted CPUs on the party who attempt to kill their own sisters but, after an intense battle, Uzume succeeds in cancelling out Kurome's mind-controlling negative energy with Share energy. Kurome reveals that Uzume's growing power also increases her own, allowing her to physically manifest in the Hyper Dimension, leaving the party to battle Dark Green, who they destroy, along with several CPU clones.

A flashback reveals that Umio is a reincarnation of the old Uzume's lover, though he retains no memories of this. The CPU candidates and Gold Third follow Kurome to Hyper Dimension whilst the CPUs, IF, Compa and older Neptune remain in Heart Dimension where they attempt to defeat Kurome by destroying her 'heart' with Share energy. Croire intervenes and summons Dark White to destroy the CPUs, though the party emerges victorious and re-captures Croire. The Hyper Dimension party are attacked by Kurome in an attempt to seize the dimension-crossing console, which she reveals contains another fragment of Uzume's soul, though the party defeat Kurome's Dark Black and chase Kurome back to the Heart Dimension. There, the two parties regroup to attack Kurome head-on, though Kurome fuses with all four Dark CPUs to become Dark Orange; the ultimate Dark CPU, who is now powerful enough to disable Uzume's Sharing Field.

Uzume is able to reopen the Sharing Field by draining power from the original Share Crystal; her and Kurome's life-force. The party destroys Dark Orange in the Sharing Field, though Kurome orders her monsters to destroy Hyper Dimension before disappearing. With Hyper Dimension facing annihilation, Uzume orders Nepgear and Neptune to destroy the original Share Crystal, which will erase herself, Kurome, Zero/Heart Dimension and the monster hoard. With no alternative, Neptune and Nepgear comply to save their world. Uzume buys the party enough time to evacuate themselves and the friendly monsters, including Umio, back to Hyper Dimension.

=== Endings ===
There are three possible endings (in VIIR, only the Revival Ending is available):

- Unnamed (Bad) Ending - If the player fails to witness the CPU dream events in Heart Dimension before encountering the mind-controlled CPUs, the party is forced to retreat. Nepgear narrates that the dimensional fusion has accelerated, while Hyper Dimension is invaded by the mind-controlled CPUs, the Dark CPUs, and an armada of monsters.
- Ascension (Normal) Ending - Following the defeat of Kurome, Zero/Heart Dimension disappears and the party return home with heavy hearts. Post credits scenes reveal that the monster hoard never reached Hyper Dimension. Later, Neptune and Nepgear are visited by Uzume's spirit, who promises to always watch over them.
- Revival (True) Ending - If the player witnesses key events throughout the Zero and Hyper Dimension arcs, following Kurome's defeat and after Zero/Heart Dimension disappears and the party return home, Histoire reveals that Uzume can be revived with share energy, but there's a chance that Kurome will be revived instead. During the revival process, the two CPUs struggle to decide whom will be revived. Uzume emerges victorious and was revived, while Zero/Heart Dimension are restored.

== Characters ==
- Uzume Tennouboshi (天王星うずめ, Ten'nōboshi uzume)/ Orange Heart Voiced by: Mariko Honda: The secondary protagonist and a mysterious tomboy who suffers amnesia like Neptune once did (represents Sega Dreamcast). Unlike Neptune, however, she's serious and straightforward but she has her dreamy side. She's later revealed to be a CPU of Planeptune in Zerodimension, much like Plutia in Ultra Dimension. She later gains the ability to transform into Orange Heart. While as Orange Heart, her personality changes from tomboyish and serious into girly and childish but she can be serious in battle nonetheless, as in contrast to Neptune's personality change during her transformation into Purple Heart. She carries a megaphone as her default weapon.
- Gold Third: (ゴールドサァド): A group consisting of four members who attempting to take over the four nations of Gamindustri in Hyperdimension. Among them are:
  - B-Sha: Represents Bandai Namco. A young girl who plays hero and loves money but is scared of monsters. She rules over Planeptune.
  - K-Sha: Represents Konami. A young girl attending Lastation's military academy, who becomes ruthless when holding a firearm and falls in love with Noire. She rules over Lastation.
  - C-Sha: The leader of the group, represents Capcom. Rules over Lowee, but later gets subjected to torture by her own corrupt government.
  - S-Sha: Represents Square Enix. Rules over Leanbox and has Vert do missions, but has another side to her.
- Kurome Ankokuboshi: The main antagonist who is the dark side of Uzume, technically the original Uzume, and one of the Dark CPUs. Her main purpose is to merge all dimensions and destroy them into nothing.

DLC characters

- Million Arthur: Represents Square Enix's free-to-play card game, Million Arthur.
- God Eater: Represents the God Eater series
- Nitroplus: Represents Nitroplus.

== Development and release ==
The game was first announced on March 16, 2014 during the "Game no Dengeki Kanshasai 2014" stage event in Akihabara, alongside Hyperdimension Neptunia U: Action Unleashed. On June 16, 2014 it was announced that the game would be a PS4 exclusive. Compile Heart initially considered releasing each of the three chapters as separate games, and as a result different title logos were created for each story. The game is produced by Naoko Mizuno, alongside director Shingo Onodera and character artist Tsunako.

As part of a promotional collaboration with Makai Shin Trillion, costume DLC for the outfits of Makai Shin Trillion characters were released for the game on July 23, 2015.

It was released in Japan on April 23, 2015, in North America on February 2, 2016, and Europe on February 12, 2016. The Windows version was released on July 5, 2016. A Nintendo Switch version was released in Japan on March 19, 2020, and was released in North America and Europe on July 28, 2020.

== VIIR ==
On March 12, 2017, Compile Heart revealed Megadimension Neptunia VIIR (pronounced as "V2-R") for the PlayStation 4, a remake of the game that changes the battle system and adds PlayStation VR functionality. The remake also uses Silicon Studio's OROCHI 4 game engine and MIZUCHI rendering engine. It was released in Japan on August 24, 2017, in North America on May 8, 2018, and in Europe on May 11, 2018. The Windows version was released via Steam on October 22, 2018, with HTC Vive and Oculus Rift functionality.

The story of the remake takes place after the original game where Histoire expresses gratitude to the player for helping with the events that took place in the original game. Events of the original game were made into a "game" by Histoire as a way for the player to "experience" the events again. The remake's story happens as a retelling of the events of the original game up to its true ending and thus removes the multiple ending and some events are slightly altered to make the story progression easier.

In addition to the story are the VR events that can be unlocked where the main four goddesses visit the player and spends time talking about themselves. The player will sometimes be given choices that will slightly affect the conversation. Another form of VR events happens during the main story as the adult version Neptune visits the player. However, unlike the unlockable VR events that happened after the main story, these ones are implied to have happened while the player was supposedly playing the original game's story.

Unlike the Re;Birth trilogy of remakes, DLC characters from the original game are absent in VIIR. Additionally, due to the complications with the SAG Contract, Erin Fitzgerald's lines as Noire are redubbed and replaced by Erica Mendez in the English dub, although Fitzgerald's voice work as Dark Black was not replaced.

== Reception ==
Reception

Aggregate score
Aggregator	Score
Metacritic	PS4: 71/100; PS4 (VIIR): 71/100

Review scores
Publication	Score
Destructoid	6.5/10
Famitsu	32/40
Nintendo World Report	6.5/10
Push Square	6/10
RPGamer	3.5/5
RPGFan	79/100
TouchArcade	3/5
Hardcore Gamer	3/5

Megadimension Neptunia VII has received mixed reviews from critics, scoring 71/100 on Metacritic.

The game received a review score of 32/40 by Famitsu. Marcus Estrada of Hardcore Gamer gave the game a 3 out of 5 saying, "Megadimension Neptunia VII is slightly refreshing, but not enough to really revitalize this aging series." CJ Andriessen from Destructoid rated the game a 6.5/10 saying, "Megadimension Neptunia VII opts not to use its transition to the new hardware as a reason to try and expand its audience beyond the current player base."

The game sold 22,609 physical retail copies within its debut week of release in Japan.

== See also ==
- Cyberdimension Neptunia: 4 Goddesses Online
