= Tsunako =

Japanese video game designer

- Born: January 28, 1986 (age 40); Okayama, Okayama Prefecture, Japan
- Occupations: Illustrator, video game artist, character designer

Tsunako (つなこ; born January 28, 1986) is a Japanese video game creator and illustrator who worked for Idea Factory. She has designed and illustrated characters for various games and print media. She is best known for illustrating the Hyperdimension Neptunia video game series, published by Idea Factory and developed by Compile Heart, as well as the Date A Live light novel series, written by Kōshi Tachibana.

== Biography ==
Tsunako joined Idea Factory in 2007, beginning as a general game sprite creator for games such as Spectral Gene and Cross Edge. She later became the lead character designer for the Hyperdimension Neptunia game series, and signed a deal with light novel author Kōshi Tachibana as the illustrator for Date A Live. She has also made guest illustrations for games such as Sei Madou Monogatari. She ranked 6th on the Kono Light Novel ga Sugoi! 2014 Top Illustrator Rankings.

On December 1, 2018, Tsunako left her role at Idea Factory and decided to move out of the city. She noted on her blog that her reasoning for this was one of her family members being in poor physical condition. She is still set to work at Idea Factory as a freelance illustrator.

== Main works ==
=== Video games ===
- Spectral Gene (2007, PS2): in-game sprite designer
- Spectral Force Genesis (2008, NDS): character designs
- Cross Edge (2008, PS3/X360): character designs, in-game sprite illustrator
- Trinity Universe (2009, PS3): character designs and official art
- Hyperdimension Neptunia (2010, PS3): character designs and official art
- Hyperdimension Neptunia Mk2 (2011, PS3)
- Hyperdimension Neptunia Victory (2012, PS3)
- Hyperdimension Idol Neptunia PP (2013, PSVita)
- Hyperdimension Neptunia Re;Birth 1 (2013, PSVita)
- Date A Live: Rinne Utopia (2013, PS3): in-game sprite illustrator
- Fairy Fencer F (2013, PS3): character designs and official art
- Hyperdevotion Noire: Goddess Black Heart (2014, PSVita)
- Hyperdimension Neptunia Re;Birth 2: Sisters Generation (2014, PSVita)
- Date A Live: Arusu Install (2014, PS3)
- Hyperdimension Neptunia U: Action Unleashed (2014, PSVita)
- Hyperdimension Neptunia Re;Birth 3: V Century (2014, PSVita)
- Fairy Fencer F: Advent Dark Force (2015, PS4)
- Megadimension Neptunia VII (2015, PS4)
- Date A Live Twin Edition: Rio Reincarnation (2015, PSVita)
- MegaTagmension Blanc + Neptune vs. Zombies (2015, PSVita)
- Superdimension Neptune vs. Sega Hard Girls (2015, PSVita)
- Cyberdimension Neptunia: 4 Goddesses Online (2017, PS4)
- Megadimension Neptunia VIIR (2017, PS4)
- Date A Live: Rio Reincarnation HD (2017, PS4)
- Super Neptunia RPG (2018, PS4, Switch)

=== Light novels ===
- Date A Live (2011–2020): character designs and novel illustrations
- Hyperdimension Neptunia: Highschool (超次元ゲイム ネプテューヌ はいすくーる; 2012): (Note: Published by Sakuranomori Bunko, ISBN 9784891990800) character designs and novel illustrations
- King's Proposal (2021–present): character design and novel illustrations

=== Anime ===
- Engage Kiss (2022): character designs

=== Manga ===
- マンガでわかる! 東大式麻雀入門 （監修:井出洋介、2007年 池田書店）
- マンガでわかる! 東大式麻雀入門 役の覚え方入門 （監修:井出洋介、2010年 池田書店）
- マンガでわかる! 東大式麻雀入門 勝つ打ち方入門 （監修:井出洋介、2010年 池田書店）
