= Hyperdimension Neptunia (video game) =

2010 video game

- Developers: Compile Heart; Felistella (Re;Birth1)
- Publishers: JP: Idea Factory; NA: NIS America (PS3); EU: Tecmo Koei (PS3); WW: Idea Factory International (Re;Birth1)
- Director: Fumihiko Tabata
- Producer: Naoko Mizuno
- Designer: Shingo Onodera
- Artist: Tsunako
- Writers: Mitsuo Oya; Shigeki Takayama; Kenji Nagata
- Series: Hyperdimension Neptunia
- Engine: PhyreEngine
- Platforms: PlayStation 3; PlayStation Vita; Microsoft Windows; PlayStation 4; PlayStation 5 Nintendo Switch
- Release: August 19, 2010: PlayStation 3; JP: August 19, 2010; NA: February 15, 2011; EU: March 4, 2011; AU: March 31, 2011 Re;Birth1 PlayStation Vita; JP: October 31, 2013; NA: August 26, 2014; PAL: August 27, 2014 Microsoft Windows; WW: January 28, 2015 Nintendo Switch; JP: May 24, 2024 PlayStation 4 Re;Birth1 Plus; JP: May 31, 2018; WW: October 28, 2025 PlayStation 5 Neptunia ReVerse; JP: December 17, 2020; NA: June 8, 2021; EU: June 11, 2021
- Genre: Role-playing
- Mode: Single-player

Hyperdimension Neptunia (超次元ゲイム ネプテューヌ, Chōjigen Geimu Neputyūnu; lit. "Super Dimension Game Neptune") is a 2010 role-playing video game developed by Idea Factory and published by Compile Heart in Japan, NIS America in North America and Tecmo Koei in Europe exclusively for Sony's PlayStation 3. It is the first installment in the Hyperdimension Neptunia franchise and is a take on the seventh generation era "console war" among the three major home video game consoles: PlayStation 3, Xbox 360 and Wii.

The game received positive reviews in Japan, while reception was more negative elsewhere; it was followed by Hyperdimension Neptunia mk2 (2011). Hyperdimension Neptunia was completely remade, subtitled Re;Birth1, released for PlayStation Vita in 2013 in Japan, and in 2014 in the West, later also for Microsoft Windows distributed via Steam. Another remake, named Neptunia ReVerse, was released for PlayStation 5 in 2020 in Japan and 2021 in the West, adding new features such as Arrange mode allowing all of the playable characters to be used from the start.

== Gameplay ==
White Heart fighting against an enemy

This game is in essence a story-based adventure game, in the sense that much of the game is spent reading the on-screen text, as in a visual novel. However, the game also features 3D-style dungeon exploration, similar to recent Final Fantasy titles since Final Fantasy XIII. Like most modern turn-based role-playing games, the dungeons feature random encounters, treasure chests, and various obstacles. These obstacles can be cleared by utilizing the various unique dungeon skills each character of Neptune's party has.

During battle, the current turn for characters and enemies are displayed at the top right, as well as upcoming turns. When it is Neptune's turn or any other supporting character's turn, they are given a set amount of AP (Ability Points), which determines how many moves they can make. Each different move consumes a set amount of AP. There is a Sword move, which has the character slash an enemy with their weapon, a Gun move, which has the character shoot the enemy with their weapon (or in Neptune and IF's case, a gun), a Physical move, which has the character go straight up to an enemy and punch and kick them, and the Defend command, which consumes no AP, but puts the character in a defending state and ends their turn.

When using a Gun move, the circle next to the Combo Counter on the right displays your current bullet. When the game starts, you will have a default bullet. However, as the game progresses, Neptune and the party will obtain other types of bullets, and you can switch between them during combat with the shoulder buttons. Different bullet types usually have special effects or elemental powers.

Each enemy has a GP gauge, as well as an HP gauge. When that enemy is attacked, the GP gauge will decrease. When the gauge is empty, Guard Break mode will activate. During this time, that enemy will receive more damage than usual until the GP gauge refills.

What sets this game apart from other RPGs is the Game Disc System, which allows Neptune and company to perform various special actions through special combos, accessible and editable through the pause menu. Neptune can summon characters from classic video games by initiating the combo assigned to that game disc, and it will inflict higher than normal damage. Neptune can also activate a transformation state, which is called HDD (Hard Drive Divinity). This transforms Neptune into a much more powerful state, and she will gain access to two additional moves, both of which deal massive damage. Although the default transformation is Purple Heart, Neptune can also install other game discs to change her transformation. Finally, she can also use the game discs to summon an image, which appears on-screen, then inflicts higher than normal damage on the opponent. Although the default image is blank, one can change the image by using pictures in the PlayStation 3 photo library.

While a player is viewing the region screen, you can shop for additional weapons and accessories, transfer to another region through a dungeon excursion, view any side quests, and enter dungeons.

== Plot ==
=== Setting ===
The game takes place in the world of Gamindustri (ゲイムギョウ界, Geimugyō-kai; a pun on ゲーム業界 Gēmu gyōkai, "game industry"), which is divided into four regions: Planeptune, Lastation, Lowee, and Leanbox. Each region is completely different from the others, and has a Basilicom where the citizens worship their country's goddess, also known as the Console Patron Units, or simply CPU.

=== Story ===
The player takes on the role of the main protagonist Neptune, one of four goddesses who is involved in a long series of conflicts known as the Console War. After an incident where Neptune is defeated following a one on three battle with the other goddesses, she loses consciousness and begins dreaming. Upon waking, she finds herself at Compa's house having crash landed earlier in front. Neptune reveals that she can't remember anything up to that point, which leads Compa to believe that Neptune is suffering from amnesia. After hearing from Compa that monsters have begun to run loose, Neptune decides to go hunt them along with Compa. During her first hunt, she suddenly transforms into her HDD form, Purple Heart, and defeats a large monster. Eventually the two meet IF, who explains that she is looking for treasure, and Neptune invites IF to join their party. After clearing another dungeon full of monsters, the party heads to the Basilicom to gain permission to travel to other landmasses to fight more monsters.

=== Ending ===
The game features three endings, which are the Normal Ending, Bad Ending and True Ending. Under the former two endings, the Console War doesn't technically end. There was a ceasefire if one or two of the other CPUs were recruited to stop the main enemy, Arfoire, but no armistice took place afterwards. There are two possible endings after the fight. If the requirements for the True Ending are fulfilled after Arfoire is defeated, the following events lead up to the end of the Console War.

== Development and release ==
The game's name is derived from the scrapped Sega Neptune which combined the Sega Mega Drive/Genesis and Sega 32X into one unit, originally scheduled for release in 1994 or 1995 before the project was dropped after the release of the Sega Saturn.

Nao from 5pb. Records performed the opening song of the game. The theme of the game, Ryuusei no Bifrost (流星のビヴロスト; lit. "Bifrost of Meteors" or "Meteor Bifrost") was released on a single album, along with the song "Sincerely". Both songs are available on the album Prismatic Infinity Carat.

Hyperdimension Neptunia was shown at a closed door event during the Game Developers Conference 2010 in March 2010. The game was released on August 19, 2010, in Japan, in North America on February 15, 2011, in Europe on March 4, 2011, and in Australia on March 31, 2011.

Various different types of downloadable content (DLC) exist for Hyperdimension Neptunia, including character, quest, and item downloads. In total, $98 of DLC was released for the game in the United States.

== Hyperdimension Neptunia Re;Birth 1 ==
In-game screenshot of the battle system of the Vita remake, demonstrating the interface changes from the original PS3 version

Hyperdimension Neptunia Re;Birth 1 (超次次元ゲイム ネプテューヌRe;Birth1), developed by Felistella and released for the PlayStation Vita and Microsoft Windows, is a full recreation of the original Hyperdimension Neptunia, bringing with it a very different take on the original core scenario, optimized performance, reworked script and voice acting, and an all-new feature dubbed the "remake system", which unlocks special game modifications such as new dungeons and in-battle perks. The remake also have some elements based on and borrowed from the then latest main game, Hyperdimension Neptunia Victory, such as the visual interface, soundtrack, map design and core gameplay mechanics. Some characters from the original game were removed, such as Gust, Nisa, 5pb. and Red, whilst new characters were added, including the CPU candidates and another series of characters representing game developer companies; Plutia and Peashy from Hyperdimension Neptunia Victory, in addition to Histoire, are playable as DLC characters.

Similarly to Hyperdimension Neptunia Victory, the battles feature a visible bar known as the "EXE drive gauge", with up to 4 stages that fills during battles within the same dungeon. Specific character abilities known as "EXE abilities" can be performed once the required gauge level is met. In addition, characters can execute "EXE finisher" attacks at the end of a combo, depending on the gauge level.

The original continent travel system involving getting through dungeons, then named "Terraportation", has been scrapped in favor of a world map screen similar to that of Hyperdimension Neptunia mk2, and the dungeon maps are based on a style reminiscent to that of Hyperdimension Neptunia Victory. During the development phase, the enhanced Vita version was intended to fill in what were identified as flaws and shortcomings of the original game. Developers aimed to address the concerns of fans, and features of the earlier PS3 version that were often subject to criticism, such as character interactions, game performance and the music, were totally changed and improved in the remake. The game's intro song is Miracle Portable Mission by nao and the ending song is Mirai Button by Afilia Saga.

Unlike the first four games in the series published by NIS America, a western localization was published by Idea Factory International and it was released on August 26, 2014, in North America, while the European version came out the following day.

An enhanced port for PlayStation 4, titled Hyperdimension Neptunia Re;Birth 1 Plus (超次次元ゲイム ネプテューヌRe;Birth1 Plus, Chōjigen Geimu Neputyūnu Re;Birth1 Plus; lit. "Super Dimension Game Neptune Re;Birth1 Plus") was announced on February 6, 2018, by Compile Heart in one of the interviews for the Dengeki PlayStation magazine. It included Dengekiko, a character in the series, as a playable character. The port launched on May 31, 2018, in Japan for 5,800 yen for the standard edition and 7,800 yen for the limited edition. Re;Birth 1 was ported to Nintendo Switch in Japan on May 23, 2024. An English release was planned for May 21, three days earlier than the Japanese version but was delayed indefinitely a day before release. On December 13, the English version was cancelled, with Idea Factory stating Nintendo had refused the release as they had "not complied with the Nintendo Guidelines. The game was release in English in 2025, with physical versions available throughout asia.

=== Neptunia ReVerse ===
An enhanced port of Hyperdimension Neptunia Re;Birth 1 Plus titled Neptunia Re★Verse (known as Go! Go! 5 Jigen Game Neptune: re★Verse in Japan) for PlayStation 5 was announced in August 2020, with pre-orders including a download code for a port of Neptunia Shooter. It features overhauled graphics, new minigames and the ability to set your party to up to 4 characters instead of 3 at a time as well as added CGs for story. It was released on December 17, 2020, in Japan, and released on June 8, 2021, and June 11, 2021, in North America and Europe, respectively.

== Reception ==
=== Hyperdimension Neptunia ===
Reception

Aggregate score
Aggregator	Score
Metacritic	45/100

Review scores
Publication	Score
Destructoid	3/10
Eurogamer	2/10
GameRevolution	D
GameSpot	3/10
GamesRadar+	2.5/5
IGN	6/10
Play	21%

The original version received favourable reviews in Japan. GameWatch notes that the gameplay is interesting and the parody aspects of the game have its appeals, although the colourfulness of the characters might suppress the plot.

However, it was panned in the West. It received an aggregated score of 45/100 on Metacritic based on 31 reviews. Eurogamer gave it a 2/10, stating that it is "a sexist, senseless, and ultimately stupid cultural curio." GameSpot gave the game a 3/10, criticizing mostly the oversexualized character design and "truly awful music". On the other hand, IGN gave the game a 6/10, praising its decent length and lack of need for level grinding, but criticizing the game's easiness and music.

=== Hyperdimension Neptunia Re;Birth 1 ===
Reception

Aggregate score
Aggregator	Score
Metacritic	VITA: 69/100; PC: 72/100

Review scores
Publication	Score
Famitsu	33/40
Hardcore Gamer	4/5
IGN	6/10

The PlayStation Vita remake Hyperdimension Neptunia Re;Birth 1 sold 31,811 physical retail copies within its first week of release in Japan. Famitsu gave Re;Birth 1 a review score of 33/40.

In the West, it received mixed reviews. Aggregating review website Metacritic gave the remake 69/100 based on 16 reviews, and the Microsoft Windows version 72/100 based on 4 reviews.

Hardcore Gamer gave the western release of Hyperdimension Neptunia Re;Birth a 4 out of 5 rating, referring to it as a significant improvement over its predecessor on the PS3, while effectively fitting a console RPG into a portable game. IGN Italy scored the game 7.4/10, referring to it as a "cheerful, alluring and pleasant" title for fans of the genre. Technology Tell gave a rating of A, referring to the game as one of the best RPG titles on the Vita alongside Persona 4 Golden, while GameZone praised the game's mechanics and new changes, giving a score of 8.5 out of 10. Just Push Start, RPG Site and Push Square all gave review scores of 8/10, noting that the improved visuals provide no framerate issues and that the game features solid Japanese and English voice acting, while Battle Screen rated the game a 7.5/10, referring to it as the best Neptunia title to date. General consensus among western reviewers is that the Vita remake improves over the flaws within the original PS3 title.
