= Trinity Universe =

2009 video game

- North American Cover Art
- Developers: Nippon Ichi Software, Gust Corporation, Idea Factory
- Publishers: JP: Idea Factory; WW: NIS America
- Artist: Tsunako
- Engine: PhyreEngine
- Platform: PlayStation 3
- Release: JP: October 1, 2009; EU: June 25, 2010; NA: June 29, 2010
- Genre: Role-playing game
- Mode: Single-player

Trinity Universe (トリニティ・ユニバース, Toriniti Yunibāsu) is a 2009 console role-playing game, co-developed by Nippon Ichi Software, Idea Factory and Gust Corporation exclusively for the PlayStation 3. The game is published by Idea Factory in Japan and NIS America in North America and Europe and was released in Japan on October 1, 2009 and in North America and Europe in June 2010. The game features characters from the Atelier and Disgaea series from Gust Corporation and Nippon Ichi Software respectively, with fully 3D character models for the first time.

== Characters ==
=== Original characters ===
- Kanata (カナタ, Kanata)

Also known as Demon Dog King Kanata (犬魔王カナタ, Inu Maō Kanata), Kanata hails from a lineage that was tasked with sacrificing themselves to become "Demon God Gems". These gems are capable of emitting energy that repels drifting objects in space, so as to prevent them from crashing into the Netheruniverse's capital, Empyria. He resists his fate during the ritual and becomes a Demon Dog King instead, his vassal Tsubaki frees him from his prison cell, and they both flee his family castle. He now lives a carefree life instead.

- Rizelea (リーゼリアル, Rīzeriaru)

Also known as Valkyrie Rizelea (戦女神リーゼリアル, Ikusa Megami Rīzeriaru), Rizelea has worked for the Goddess Union as a Valkyrie in order to keep peace and order in the universe. During her last mission to restore peace in the Netheruniverse, she decides to take action independent of the Goddess Union and starts an investigation about the drifting objects that travels towards Empyria. Prefers people to call her "Riz" (リゼリア Rizeria in the Japanese version).

- Tsubaki (ツバキ, Tsubaki)

Also known as Fox Spirit Tsubaki (妖狐ツバキ, Yōko Tsubaki), she is Kanata's caretaker that is always by his side. Always behaving like a Yamato Nadeshiko, her true, scary nature slips out occasionally when she gets angry. No one knows of her secret ambitions.

- Lucius (ルキウス, Rukiusu)

Also known as The Dark Hero Lucius (暗黒勇者ルキウス, Ankoku Yūsha Rukiusu), an arrogant human who used to be a Hero of Light, but a certain incident caused him to fall and become a Dark Hero instead. He aims to usurp the throne to the Netheruniverse. Takes pride in his ahoge (lit. "fool's hair", an antenna-like hair that is a typical anime feature), and becomes mad and needlessly defensive whenever someone makes fun of it.

- Recit (レシート, Reshīto)

Also known as Treasure Hunter Recit (トレジャーハンター・レシート, Torejā Hantā Reshīto), a Treasure Hunter who travels all over space and believes that going on adventures is the duty of all men. He is very passionate and friendly to his friends, but he has a complex over his name Recit because it sounds like 'receipt'. Designed by Kazuyuki Yoshizumi, character designer for Gust's Mana Khemia series.

- Miyu (みゆ, Miyu)

Also known as Managraphic Artist Miyu (マナグラフィッカーみゆ, Mana Gurafikkā Miyu), Miyu is a snow cat spirit whose job is to draw Managraphics, magic symbols, on weapons. She works very hard in order to send money to her poor family which lives on the other side of the universe. Cries easily in all kinds of situations, from being sad or happy, to confused or nervous. Designed by Yoshihiko Imaizumi, character designer for Nippon Ichi's Jigsaw World game.

- Mizuki (ミズキ, Mizuki)

Also known as Super Assassin Idol Mizuki (スーパーアサシンアイドル・ミズキ, Sūpā Asashin Aidoru Mizuki), Mizuki is literally a super idol and assassin combined. She can sing, dance and assassinate, and is pretty famous in the Netheruniverse. Very positive and optimistic, but a little selfish. Her catchphrase is 'Are you prepared for your beautiful assassination?!' ("覚悟せよ♪" in the Japanese version, literally "get ready!").

- Suzaku (スザク, Suzaku)

Also known as Castle Overseer (ラスボス・スザク, Rasu Bosu Suzaku) (the Japanese title, Last Boss Suzaku, is most likely a reference to Disgaea's Mid Boss Vyer). A mystic that serves at Kanata's castle. Speaks with a feminine tone (an okama accent in the Japanese version), which sometimes conflicts with his appearance. Because of his household's and castle's economic deficits, he works several jobs such as being Mizuki's manager and an Innkeeper. He juggles these jobs with fighting with Kanata and Rizelea's party as well.

- Macaroon (マカロン, Makaron)
- Shuten (酒呑童子, Shuten-dōji)
- Ashura (アシュラ, Ashura)

=== Nippon Ichi characters ===
- Flonne (フロン, Furon) from Disgaea: Hour of Darkness

Also known as Universal Witch Girl, Galaxy Flonne (宇宙魔女っ娘・ギャラクシーフロン, Uchū Majokko Gyarakushī Furon). A witch girl traveling around the universe in a spaceship on a quest to fill the world with love. She is currently chasing Etna, who stole her spaceship.

- Etna (エトナ, Etona) from Disgaea: Hour of Darkness

Also known as Galaxy Beauty Pirate Captain Etna (銀河美少女海賊・キャプテンエトナ, Ginga Bishōjo Kaizoku Kyaputen Etona). The pretty captain of a stolen ship, currently on a journey to find legendary sweets and conquer the world. The latter is her secondary goal.

- Prinny (プリニー, Purinī) from Disgaea: Hour of Darkness

Also known as Low Income Worker Prinnies (低賃金雑用使い魔・プリニー, Teichingin Zatsuyō Tsukaima Purinī). Etna's servants who toil solely for money, while continuing to work for Etna because they fear her as well. Frequently launched as cannonballs from the cannons in Etna's spaceship since they explode when thrown.

=== Gust characters ===
- Pamela Ibis (パメラ・イービス, Pamera Ībisu) from Atelier Viorate: Alchemist of Gramnad 2

Also known as Ghastly Inn Mascot, Pamela (幽霊亭の看板娘パメラ, Yūreitei no Kanban Musume Pamera), Pamela works at an inn on Empyria. As usual, she enjoys pulling pranks on people by suddenly appearing around them (especially the Prinnies and Lucius). Despite being a ghost, she is merry and cheerful all the time, though she often sounds flat or without any real opinion at all.

- Violet (Viorate) Platane (ヴィオラート・プラターネ, Viorāto Puratāne) from Atelier Viorate: Alchemist of Gramnad 2

Also known as Alchemist Violet (錬金術士ヴィオラート, Renkinjutsushi Viorāto), she prefers people to call her simply Vio (ヴィオ Vio). A cheerful and active girl, Vio is very sociable and can make friends with anyone instantly. She creates a lot of things using materials from all over the Netheruniverse, as part of her alchemy training. She thinks that carrots are the ultimate ingredients in cooking. Her goals are to become a great alchemist and to make the best food using carrots as her main, if not only, ingredient. This also marks Violet's first appearance in the U.S. since the game she originates from was not localized (much like with Marie in Cross Edge).

== Gameplay ==
In Trinity Universe's battle system, each attack uses a certain amount of AP, and skills are assigned to three different buttons, it has a very similar combat system to Hyperdimension Neptunia except without Neptunia's extensive customization. If players execute a string of skills, they can deal more damage. Time is said to be an important element, with players having a set period in which to destroy a gravitation field and escape a dungeon.

The game features two different scenarios, Goddess side which features Gust characters, and a Demon Lord side with Nippon Ichi characters. The protagonist in the Demon Lord story line is a devil dog named Kanata, while the Goddess side stars the Valkyrie Rizelea.

== Reception ==
Reception

Aggregate score
| Aggregator | Score |
|---|---|
| Metacritic | 62/100 |

Review scores
| Publication | Score |
|---|---|
| Edge | 6/10 |
| Eurogamer | 6/10 |
| Famitsu | 29/40 |
| GamePro | 3/5 |
| GamesMaster | 55% |
| GameSpot | 7/10 |
| GamesTM | 4/10 |
| Play | 61% |
| PSM3 | 42% |
| RPGamer | 2/5 |
| RPGFan | (Patrick) 73% (Andrew) 63% |
| Metro | 5/10 |

The game received "mixed" reviews according to the review aggregation website Metacritic. In Japan, Famitsu gave it a score of one six, two eights, and one seven, for a total of 29 out of 40.
