= Hyperdimension Neptunia: Producing Perfection =

2013 video game

- Developers: Compile Heart; Tamsoft
- Publishers: JP: Idea Factory; WW: NIS America
- Series: Hyperdimension Neptunia
- Platform: PlayStation Vita
- Release: JP: June 20, 2013; NA: June 3, 2014; AU: June 5, 2014; EU: June 6, 2014
- Genres: Life simulation, rhythm
- Mode: Single-player

Hyperdimension Neptunia: Producing Perfection, known in Japan as Kami Jigen Idol Neptune PP (神次元アイドル ネプテューヌＰＰ, Kami Jigen Aidoru Neputyūnu PP; lit. "Ultra Dimension Idol Neptune PP") is a life simulation and rhythm video game developed by Compile Heart and Tamsoft and published by Idea Factory in Japan and NIS America in North America, Australia and Europe exclusively for the Sony PlayStation Vita. The game is a spin-off of the Hyperdimension Neptunia game series. The game was released in Japan on June 20, 2013, in North America on June 3, 2014, in Australia on June 5, 2014, and in Europe on June 6, 2014.

== Story ==
All of a sudden an idol game appears and MOB48 (a reference to the real-world idol group AKB48) are taking shares away from the four goddesses (Console Patron Units, or simply CPUs). Players have to get shares back by earning stage points during live performances. Each show, the number of fans and haters will change depending on the show. Players can choose costumes for the idols and change the camera angle. During live events, the CPUs can transform which also transforms their singing voice.

== Characters ==
The four goddesses, Neptune, Noire, Blanc and Vert are all set to return in this game. They are in their Victory costumes according to the official website.

Their sisters, Nepgear, Uni, Ram and Rom are also set to appear in the game. Players can use them in the concerts as background dancers in unlimited live mode only.

IF and Compa are also usable as background dancers as well.

== Reception ==
Reception

Aggregate score
Aggregator	Score
Metacritic	54/100

Review scores
Publication	Score
Destructoid	6/10
Famitsu	29/40
GameZone	4.5/10
Hardcore Gamer	2.5/5
IGN	4/10
Jeuxvideo.com	12/20
Pocket Gamer	3.5/5
Push Square	4/10
USgamer	4/5

The game received "mixed" reviews according to the review aggregation website Metacritic. In Japan, Famitsu gave it a score of one eight and three sevens for a total of 29 out of 40.
