= King's Proposal =

Japanese light novel series

- First light novel cover

王様のプロポーズ (Ōsama no Puropōzu)
- Genre: Adventure, fantasy
- Light novel
- Written by: Kōshi Tachibana
- Illustrated by: Tsunako
- Published by: Fujimi Shobo
- English publisher: NA: Yen Press
- Imprint: Fujimi Fantasia Bunko
- Original run: September 18, 2021 – present
- Volumes: 8 + 1 short story
- Manga
- Written by: Kōshi Tachibana
- Illustrated by: Nemo Kurio
- Published by: Square Enix
- Imprint: Gangan Comics Online
- Magazine: Gangan Online
- Original run: February 24, 2023 – March 7, 2025
- Volumes: 6
- Anime television series
- Licensed by: NA: Aniplex of America
- Original run: 2027 – scheduled
- icon

King's Proposal (Japanese: 王様のプロポーズ, Hepburn: Ōsama no Puropōzu) is a Japanese light novel series written by Kōshi Tachibana and illustrated by Tsunako. It has been published by Fujimi Shobo's Fujimi Fantasia Bunko imprint since September 2021. A web manga adaptation illustrated by Nemo Kurio was published on Square Enix's Gangan Online website from February 2023 to March 2025. An anime television series adaptation is set to premiere in 2027.

== Plot ==
Saika Kuozaki is the headmistress of an academy for mages, the most powerful mage to exist, and the only one who can stop the world from being destroyed. She and an ordinary high school boy who stumbles upon her, Mushiki Kuga, are mortally wounded by an enemy. Saika uses her magic to try and save them, causing Mushiki to inhabit her body and inherit her responsibilities.

== Characters ==
Mushiki Kuga (玖珂 無色, Kuga Mushiki)
Voiced by: Koki Uchiyama (PV)
Saika Kuozaki (遠久崎 彩禍, Kuozaki Saika)
Voiced by: Rie Takahashi (PV, anime)
Kuroe Karasuma (烏丸 黒衣, Karasuma Kuroe)
Voiced by: Ai Kakuma (PV)
Ruri Fuyajou (不夜城 瑠璃, Fuyajou Ruri)
Voiced by: Nao Tōyama (PV)
Elluc Flaer (エルルカ・フレエラ, Eruruka Fureera)
Voiced by: Shiori Izawa (PV)
Kurara Tokishima (鴇嶋 喰良, Tokishima Kurara)
Voiced by: Fairouz Ai (PV)
Anviette Svarner (アンヴィエット・スヴァルナー, Anvietto Suvarunā)

== Media ==
=== Light novel ===
Written by Kōshi Tachibana and illustrated by Tsunako, the first King's Proposal's volume was released by Fujimi Shobo's Fujimi Fantasia Bunko imprint on September 18, 2021. As of November 2025, eight volumes and a short story volume have been released.

In April 2022, Yen Press announced that they had licensed the light novels; the first novel was released on November 22 of the same year.

| No. | Title | Original release date | English release date |
|---|---|---|---|
| 1 | The Witch of Resplendent Color 極彩の魔女 | September 18, 2021; 978-4-04-074075-1 | November 22, 2022; 978-1-9753-5150-2 |
| 2 | The Crested Ibis Demon 鴇羽の悪魔 | April 20, 2022; 978-4-04-074076-8 | April 18, 2023; 978-1-9753-5163-2 |
| 3 | The Lapis Knight 瑠璃の騎士 | September 16, 2022; 978-4-04-074686-9 | September 19, 2023; 978-1-9753-7003-9 |
| 4 | The Golden Maiden 黄金の神子 | April 20, 2023; 978-4-04-074880-1 | March 19, 2024; 978-1-9753-8051-9 |
| 5 | The Crimson Sage 真赭の賢者 | September 20, 2023; 978-4-04-075105-4 | August 20, 2024; 978-1-9753-9324-3 |
| 6 | The Silver Fairy 銀灰の妖精 | April 19, 2024; 978-4-04-075342-3 | May 27, 2025; 979-8-8554-1433-2 |
| 7 | The Raven-Black Attendant 烏黒の従者 | December 20, 2024; 978-4-04-075626-4 | January 27, 2026; 979-8-8554-2251-1 |
| 8 | The Apostle of the Rose 薔薇の使徒 | August 20, 2025; 978-4-04-075942-5 | October 13, 2026; 979-8-8554-3795-9 |
| 1B | — | November 20, 2025; 978-4-04-076176-3 | — |
| 9 | 四色の番人 | December 18, 2026; 978-4-04-076602-7 | — |

=== Manga ===
A web manga adaptation, illustrated by Nemo Kurio, was serialized on Square Enix's Gangan Online website from February 24, 2023, to March 7, 2025. Square Enix collected its chapters in six tankōbon volumes, released from September 20, 2023, to March 12, 2025.

| No. | Release date | ISBN |
|---|---|---|
| 1 | September 20, 2023 | 978-4-7575-8732-8 |
| 2 | October 12, 2023 | 978-4-7575-8856-1 |
| 3 | March 12, 2024 | 978-4-7575-9105-9 |
| 4 | August 9, 2024 | 978-4-7575-9357-2 |
| 5 | March 12, 2025 | 978-4-7575-9743-3 |
| 6 | March 12, 2025 | 978-4-7575-9744-0 |

=== Anime ===
An anime adaptation was announced during the "Fantasia Bunko Hōsōkyoku Aki no Dai Kanshasai" livestream event on October 25, 2025. It was later revealed to be a television series that is set to premiere in 2027.

Aniplex of America has licensed the series.

== Reception ==
In the 2023 edition of Takarajimasha's annual light novel guide book Kono Light Novel ga Sugoi!, King's Proposal ranked 13th in the new work category.

== See also ==
- Date A Live, another light novel series written by Kōshi Tachibana and illustrated by Tsunako
