= Super Neptunia RPG =

2018 video game

- Global Cover Art
- Developers: Artisan Studios; Compile Heart; Idea Factory
- Publishers: JP: Idea Factory; WW: Idea Factory International
- Director: Julien Bourgeois
- Artist: Tsunako
- Series: Hyperdimension Neptunia
- Engine: Unity
- Platforms: Nintendo Switch; PlayStation 4; Microsoft Windows
- Release: Nintendo Switch, PS4: JP: December 20, 2018; NA: June 25, 2019; EU: June 28, 2019; Microsoft Windows: WW: June 20, 2019
- Genre: Role-playing
- Mode: Single-player

Super Neptunia RPG (Note: Japanese: 勇者ネプテューヌ世界よ宇宙よ刮目せよ！！ アルティメットRPG宣言！！) is a 2018 side-scrolling role-playing video game in the Hyperdimension Neptunia series developed by Artisan Studios, with assistance from Idea Factory and Compile Heart. It was published by Idea Factory for the PlayStation 4, Nintendo Switch, and Microsoft Windows via Steam. In the game, Neptune, Noire, Blanc, and Vert, all suffering from amnesia, oppose Bombyx Mori, a group that forces citizens to create 2D video games while forbidding other games.

Super Neptunia RPG was first released in December 2018 in Japan, and then released by Idea Factory International worldwide in June 2019. Primarily developed by a French-Canadian studio, it is the first game in the series that has been developed by a company not located in Japan.

== Gameplay ==
In Super Neptunia RPG, the player travels a horizontal world of dungeons, cities, and more. In cities, players can buy and sell items and weapons, accept and report quests, and enter different buildings. In dungeons, monsters are roaming and treasure boxes containing items are hidden. Touching a monster begins a battle, which can be conducted with up to 4 party members. As time passes, Action Points (AP) will accumulate, and each character can use AP in order to activate their Skills. Skills have an Elemental type, and it affects the damage that enemies and allies take. Damaging enemies with the element to which they are weak will recover AP.

The game's playable characters are Gamindustri's 4 CPUs (Neptune, Noire, Blanc, and Vert), their HDD forms (Purple Heart, Black Heart, White Heart, and Green Heart) and a new character named Chrome. Additional characters IF, Compa, and Artisan (also a new character) are playable via paid downloadable content.

== Music ==
- Opening Theme: "Dia vo Lhizer" by Eri Sasaki
- Ending Theme: "Never ending true stories" by Asaka

== Reception ==
Reception

Aggregate score
Aggregator	Score
Metacritic	NS: 62/100; PS4: 60/100

Review scores
Publication	Score
Nintendo Life	7/10
Pocket Gamer	2.5/5
Push Square	6/10
RPGamer	2.5/5
RPGFan	66/100

Super Neptunia RPG received generally mixed reviews. Praise was given to its art direction and presentation, while performance and difficult platforming were cited as issues. Additional criticism was given towards Sony's decision to censor the PS4 version.
