= Felistella =

Japanese video game developer

- Industry: Video games
- Founded: July 2010
- Headquarters: Gifu, Japan
- Key people: Takayuki Kinoshita (president)
- Number of employees: 16 (as of April 2015)
- Website: http://felistella.co.jp/index.html

Felistella (Note: Felistella (FELISTELLA株式会社, Ferisutera Kabushiki-gaisha)) is a Japanese video game developer based in Gifu. It was founded in July 2010 by former Flight-Plan employees. In April 2015, Felistella and Idea Factory entered a capital tie-up agreement, in which Idea Factory acquired a portion of Felistella's stock.

== Games ==
Year	Title	Publisher	Platform
2012	Agarest Senki: Mariage (Note: Co-developed with Idea Factory and Red Entertainment)	Compile Heart	PlayStation Portable
2012	Summon Night 3 (PlayStation Portable port)	Bandai Namco Games	PlayStation Portable
2012	Summon Night 4 (PlayStation Portable port)	Bandai Namco Games	PlayStation Portable
2013	Summon Night 5	Bandai Namco Games	PlayStation Portable
2013	Hyperdimension Neptunia Re;Birth 1 (Note: Co-developed with Idea Factory and Compile Heart)	Compile Heart	PlayStation Vita
2014	Hyperdimension Neptunia Re;Birth 2: Sisters Generation	Compile Heart	PlayStation Vita
2014	Hyperdimension Neptunia Re;Birth 3: V Generation	Compile Heart	PlayStation Vita
2015	Koesta	Think & Feel	Android, iOS
2015	Luminous Arc Infinity	Marvelous	PlayStation Vita
2015	Superdimension Neptune vs Sega Hard Girls	Compile Heart	PlayStation Vita
2016	Genkai Tokki: Seven Pirates	Compile Heart	PlayStation Vita
2017	Genkai Tokki: Castle Panzers	Compile Heart	PlayStation 4
2019	Azur Lane Crosswave	Compile Heart	PlayStation 4, Nintendo Switch
2021	Maglam Lord	D3 Publisher (Japan); PQube (Worldwide)	PlayStation 4, Nintendo Switch
2022	Genkai Tokki: Seven Pirates H	Compile Heart (Japan); Eastasiasoft (Worldwide)	Nintendo Switch
