= Hyperdevotion Noire: Goddess Black Heart =

2014 video game

- Developers: Compile Heart; Sting
- Publishers: JP: Compile Heart; WW: Idea Factory International
- Artist: Tsunako
- Series: Hyperdimension Neptunia
- Platforms: PlayStation Vita, Microsoft Windows
- Release: PlayStation Vita: JP: May 29, 2014; NA: February 24, 2015; EU: February 27, 2015; AU: March 4, 2015; Microsoft Windows: WW: April 26, 2016; Nintendo Switch: JP: February 13, 2025
- Genre: Tactical role-playing
- Mode: Single-player

Hyperdevotion Noire: Goddess Black Heart (超女神信仰ノワール 激神ブラックハート, Chō Megami Shinkō Nowāru Geki-Shin Burakkuhāto; literally "Hyper-goddess faith Noire: fierce god Black heart") is a 2014 tactical role-playing game developed by Compile Heart and Sting Entertainment. The game is a spin-off title of the Hyperdimension Neptunia game series featuring Noire as the main character. The game was released in Japan on May 29, 2014, and in North America and Europe in February 2015. It was originally a PlayStation Vita exclusive. A port for Microsoft Windows was released on April 26, 2016. A Nintendo Switch port was released in Japan on February 13, 2025.

== Gameplay ==
In-game screenshot of the battle system, demonstrating how units appear on the field

The game features chibi versions of the original Hyperdimension Neptunia characters which battle against enemies on a tactical grid map. The gameplay is turn-based, and map elevation has an effect on characters' abilities and mobility; certain units are more capable of climbing to higher terrain than others, and units take damage from falling. The field maps feature various gimmicks, including rail cars, flaming pits, logs, artillery batteries, laser beams and moving platforms. Each of the playable characters move by traveling along each square of the map grid, however certain enemies are able to take up more than one square on the map grid.

Prior to beginning a mission, the player is able to select characters as participating units, equip them, and designate a mission leader. Akin to various other tactical RPG games, the battle system is separated into player and enemy phases, where each side takes turns in moving characters and executing commands. There is a new mechanic known as "Lily Boost", which involves adjacent units developing special bonds that grant special skills and abilities such as goddess transformations; kissing animations are displayed upon activation. During battle, characters can become affected by a series of status ailments which alter the state of battle, which include zombification, cowardice, turning into tofu, meganekko, becoming 8-bit, and infatuation. Items can be crafted from raw materials. The player is also able to customise Noire's room within the "Sim Noire" mode, using furniture purchasable with in-game points.

== Plot ==
Unlike previous Hyperdimension Neptunia games, Gekishin Black Heart is not set within the world of Gamindustri (ゲイムギョウ界, Geimugyōkai), but instead within a similar but separate world known as Gamarket (ゲイムシジョウ界, Geimushijōkai). The goddesses of each of the four nations battle against one another for hegemony over the world day by day, however just as Noire is one step away from complete domination, the goddesses' powers are robbed by an unknown force. In order to save the world from destruction, the four goddesses cooperate with one another with the aim of unifying Gamarket.

=== Characters ===
The game features the four main characters from previous games, in addition to a series of 18 new playable characters, each a parody (or an apotheosis) representing a game franchise, genre, or game developer.

==== Main characters ====
- Noire (ノワール): Main character central to the game, representing the PlayStation.
- Neptune (ネプテューヌ): Original protagonist of the Hyperdimension Neptunia main series, representing the Sega Neptune.
- Vert (ベール): Represents the Xbox.
- Blanc (ブラン): Represents the Wii.

New characters

- Lee-Fi (リーファイ): A girl in a China dress and hair buns, a parody to Chun-Li of Capcom's Street Fighter.
- Lid (リッド): A woman wearing a bandana and an electronic eyepatch, parody of Solid Snake from the Metal Gear Solid series. Capable of hiding within a cardboard box in-game.
- Resta (レストア): A girl who likes bananas and frequently thinks of lewd things, a parody of Record of Agarest War by Compile Heart.
- Estelle (エステル): A girl in a knight outfit, representing Dragon Quest.
- Ein Al (アイン・アル): A character that represents the Final Fantasy series of RPGs, she bears a similar design to Tidus, the main protagonist of Final Fantasy X.
- Poona (プーナ): A reference to Opoona.
- Moru (モルー): A girl with cat ears and hunter clothes, representing Monster Hunter.
- Ai Masujima (増嶋愛): A singing idol, based on The Idolmaster.
- Ryuka (リューカ): Her name refers to the Yakuza game series which is known as Ryū ga Gotoku (龍が如く) in Japan. Her name's consist from the protagonist, Kiryu Kazuma.
- Blossom Aisen (ブロッサ・愛染): Represents the Sakura Wars series of strategy games.
- Tsunemi (ツネミ): A girl wearing studio monitor speakers as hair ornaments along with a Vocaloid-style dress, and is a parody of rhythm games; her name itself consists of the three middle syllables of "Hatsune Miku" when spelled in Japanese Katakana.
- Wyn (ウィン): A sporty girl donning association football wear with a soccerball balanced on her head, and likes to place the team over herself. A parody of Konami's Winning Eleven series (Pro Evolution Soccer in the west). Her names come from Tsubasa(which translated as "Wing" thus become Wyn) from Tsubasa Oozora of Captain Tsubasa.
- Lady Wac (レディ・ワック): A parody of Pac-Man and Ms. Pac-Man. She dons various items and characters from Pac-Man as accessories, and is the oldest girl in the game. Her name is a parody of the sounds Pac-Man and Ms. Pac-Man make.
- Generia G (ジェネリア·G): A girl with military knowledge and a fascination of mechas. A parody of the Gundam and Super Robot Wars games. Her design is based on Talia Gladys from the Gundam series.
- Saori (サオリ): A girl of a bishōjo game who dreams of falling in love, despite never experiencing it. She is most likely based on Shiori Fujisaki from Tokimeki Memorial.
- Vio (ビオ): A girl with a pistol and an umbrella, a parody of Resident Evil (known as Biohazard in Japan). Her names originally came from slight change of Leon S. Kennedy spelling in katakana (Riion) of Resident Evil 4.
- Sango (サンゴ): Dresses in old fashioned Japanese clothing, a parody of the Dynasty Warriors franchise by Koei (known as Sangoku Musō in Japan).
- Little Rain (リトル·レイン): A girl based on Idea Factory's Neverland franchise, particularly Blazing Souls character Little Snow.

==== DLC characters ====
Additional playable characters can be added to the game via paid DLC.

- IF: From the previous Hyperdimension Neptunia games within the series.
- Compa: From the previous Hyperdimension Neptunia games within the series.
- Tiara: Character from Fairy Fencer F who makes a cameo appearance.
- Sting: Character representing Sting, the developer of the game.

== Development ==
The project was initially announced during the Game no Dengeki Kanshasai 2013 festival. The game is produced by series producer Naoko Mizuno, producer Higashiro, and development producer Hikaru Yasui. The opening theme song is "Jet Black Sustain" (漆黒のサステイン, Shikkoku no sasutein) performed by Asami Imai and produced by 5pb., and the ending song is "Hug" by Marina.

== Reception ==
Reception

Aggregate score
| Aggregator | Score | |
| Aggregator | PC | PS Vita |
|---|---|---|
| Metacritic | 65/100 | 68/100 |

Review scores
| Publication | Score | |
| Publication | PC | PS Vita |
|---|---|---|
| Destructoid | N/A | 4.5/10 |
| Famitsu | N/A | 31/40 |
| The Digital Fix | N/A | 7/10 |
| Slant Magazine | N/A | 3/5 |

The Vita version received positive reviews in Japan. Famitsu gave it a review score of one seven and three eights for a total of 31 out of 40. Said Vita version sold 28,397 physical retail copies within the first week of release in Japan, placing fourth place amongst the Japanese software sales charts for that particular week.

In the West, the game received "mixed or average reviews" on both platforms according to the review aggregation website Metacritic. Hardcore Gamer said that the Vita version "offers great gameplay with the unfortunate caveat that you’ll need to waste more time than expected waiting on enemies to enjoy it."
