= Hyperdimension Neptunia U: Action Unleashed =

2014 video game

- European cover art
- Developers: Compile Heart; Tamsoft
- Publishers: JP: Idea Factory; WW: Idea Factory International
- Producers: Naoko Mizuno; Damien Urvois
- Artist: Kenji Teshima
- Writer: Satoshi Tsuchiya
- Series: Hyperdimension Neptunia
- Platforms: PlayStation Vita, Microsoft Windows
- Release: PlayStation Vita: JP: August 28, 2014; NA: May 19, 2015; EU: May 22, 2015; AU: May 27, 2015; Microsoft Windows: WW: March 21, 2016
- Genres: Action role-playing, hack and slash
- Mode: Single-player

Hyperdimension Neptunia U: Action Unleashed (超次元アクション ネプテューヌU, Chō Jigen Akushon Nepute~yūnu U; lit. Super Dimension Action Neptune U) is a hack and slash video game developed by Compile Heart and Tamsoft and published by Idea Factory International. As a spin-off title in the Hyperdimension Neptunia game series, it was announced by Compile Heart at the 2014 Dengeki Stage Event when the game was being created by Tamsoft who is known for their work with the Senran Kagura and Onechanbara games. The game was released in Japan on August 28, 2014, and in North America and the PAL region in May 2015 for the PlayStation Vita.

== Setting ==
A world known as Gamindustri (ゲイムギョウ界, Geimugyō-kai; a pun on ゲーム業界 Gēmu gyōkai, "game industry") protected by the divine aegis of the four CPUs (Console Patron Units, the goddesses) and their sisters, the CPU candidates. Even in this world the seeds of evil don't die out, and since brutal enemies along with ferocious monsters that appeared were quickly defeated by the collaboration between the CPUs and the CPU candidates, not only the goddesses themselves but also the inhabitants of Gamindustri ended up very bored. Due to that, the goddesses discussed an interesting proposal.

=== Plot ===
Set during peacetime after the events of the recurring 'Console War' of the previous games (albeit in an alternate, non-canonical dimension) the CPUs (Console Patron Units) of the world of Gamindustri seek to raise awareness from non-CPU supporters and new nations by improving their public profile. They are approached by a popular journalist named Dengekiko (previously known as Dengeki Lass) who offers to report on the CPUs during guild missions.

Meanwhile, rival journalist Famitsu is assigned to report on the CPUs' sisters, the CPU candidates, though the two factions soon merge into a single group, and Dengekiko and Famitsu (based on the popular Japanese gaming magazines Dengeki and Famitsu) agree to cooperate and fight alongside the CPU team after being issued transforming combat armor by their employer, which grants them near-CPU level abilities.

The party slay countless monsters, complete several guild missions and successfully boost their popularity but are soon defeated and publicly humiliated by a mysterious new adversary known as Next Gen Mech (who represents the imminent threat of next-generation consoles to older platforms) who makes a point of shaming the party on live television by tearing off their clothes.

After a brief recovery, the party analyse their battle strategy and discover that whilst they are an immensely powerful team, their attacks are not coordinated with each-other. After undergoing training exercises to integrate their attacks, and completing further guild missions to improve their public standing, the girls challenge Next Gen Mech again and emerge victorious after breaking through its defenses by working together.

Inspired by the CPUs, Dengekiko and Famitsu agree to work together on a single article rather than publishing separate reports of the CPUs' adventures. Meanwhile, the CPUs' close friends IF and Compa arrange a friendly battle tournament for the CPUs, followed by an intense combat arena in Neptral Tower, with a rebuilt Next Gen Mech awaiting them on the top floor.

== Characters ==
The four goddesses, Neptune, Noire, Blanc and Vert, and their sisters Nepgear, Uni, Ram and Rom all appear in the game. There are also two new playable characters that will be based on Japanese Gaming magazines, Dengekiko (representing magazine like the Dengeki PlayStation magazine) and Famitsu (representing the gaming review magazines).

== Reception ==
Reception

Aggregate score
Aggregator	Score	
Aggregator	PC	PS Vita
Metacritic	50/100	71/100

Review scores
Publication	Score	
Publication	PC	PS Vita
Destructoid	N/A	8/10
Famitsu	N/A	7/10, 7/10, 7/10, 6/10
GamesTM	N/A	7/10

Hyperdimension Neptunia U: Action Unleashed received "mixed or average" reviews on both platforms according to the review aggregation website Metacritic. In Japan, Famitsu gave the Vita version a score of three sevens and one six for a total of 27 out of 40.
