= Hyperdimension Neptunia =

Video game franchise

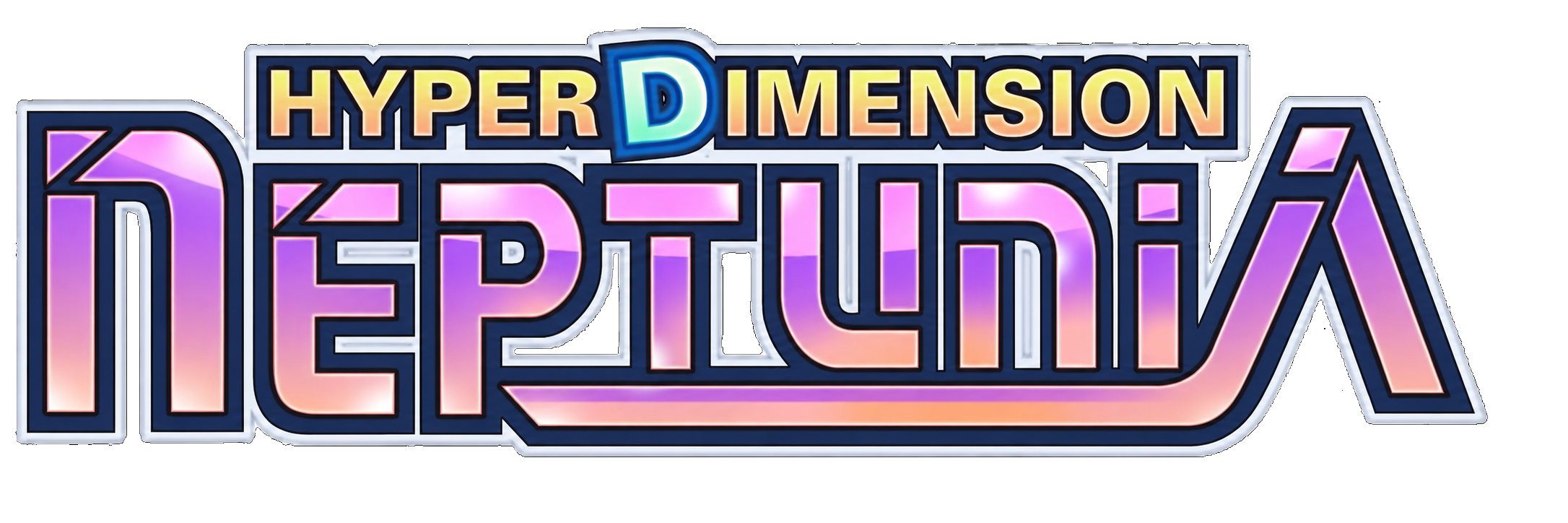
- Series logo during post-NIS America Era (2014-present)
- Genre: Role-playing
- Developers: Idea Factory; Compile Heart; Tamsoft; Felistella (PS Vita)
- Publishers: JP: Compile Heart, Idea Factory; WW: Idea Factory International (formerly NIS America and Koei Tecmo); KO: CFK (formerly Cyberfront Korea)
- Platforms: PlayStation 3, PlayStation Vita, Android, iOS, Windows, PlayStation 4, Nintendo Switch, Nintendo Switch 2, PlayStation 5, Xbox One, Xbox Series X/S
- First release: Hyperdimension Neptunia; August 19, 2010
- Latest release: Hyperspace Neptunia Unlimited; August 27, 2026

Hyperdimension Neptunia (超次元ゲイム ネプテューヌ, Chōjigen Geimu Neputyūnu; lit. 'Super Dimensional Game Neptune') is a series of role-playing video games produced by Compile Heart and Idea Factory, which revolves around and parodies the real-life video gaming industry usually from a Japanese perspective along with parodies of other forms of Japanese otaku subcultures. The series has also branched off into other forms of media, such as a manga, light novel and an anime.

The series debuted in Japan on August 19, 2010, with the video game of the same name for the PlayStation 3, and received sequels: Hyperdimension Neptunia mk2 (2011), Hyperdimension Neptunia Victory (2012), and Megadimension Neptunia VII (2015) as the last of the main series, until the release of Hyperspace Neptunia Unlimited (2026). All previously released main games have been remade at least once (such as the first three as the "Re;Birth" trilogy) and since then multiple spin-offs and crossover games have also been released for various platforms.

An anime television series adaptation, titled Hyperdimension Neptunia: The Animation, aired in Japan between July and September 2013. An OVA, titled Nepu no Natsuyasumi, was released in July 2019. A second OVA, titled Nep Nep Darake no Festival, was released in October 2022, and third OVA, titled Hidamari no Little Purple, was released in April 2023.

== Setting ==
Games within the series takes place in the world of Gamindustri (a pun on "game industry"), which is divided into four regions/nations, each ruled by one Goddess CPU: Planeptune, Lastation, Lowee, and Leanbox. Each region is completely different from the others in appearance and atmosphere, with each representing a specific video game console. Lastation represents the PlayStation, Lowee represents the Wii, and Leanbox represents the Xbox, while Planeptune represents the cancelled Sega Neptune. In the beginning of the story, the four goddesses are fighting each other for "shares" in a war known as the Console War. Shares are the manifestation of the belief citizens put into their goddess, and without shares, a goddess dies. Because some of the games feature time and/or dimension travel there are slight differences in the settings for each title.

== Development ==
Prior to Q3 2009, Compile Heart was conceptualising a new RPG project centred upon character designs by Tsunako, with the intention of collaborating with a partner company. This game was originally planned to feature three princess sisters and a protagonist. However, the partnership deal fell out, and as a result the project plans were redesigned and eventually became "Neptunia" close to the end of 2009 following the completion of Trinity Universe's development. During the early stages of the project, the characters Noire and Blanc were originally coloured red and blue respectively, however their colour schemes were changed to black and white so that they could better fit in with the new game setting and plot.

The release of the first sequel to the original game, Hyperdimension Neptunia mk2, saw the introduction of a reworked game engine and the replacement of various components such as the battle system and dungeons, which were completely rebuilt from scratch. Hyperdimension Neptunia Victory later built on this, with the parts from mk2 which were considered "weak" by the developers removed and improved, eventually setting Victory as the foundation for the design of future titles within the series. Following Compile Heart's collaboration with David Production to produce the Neptunia television animation series, the developers were able to change their approach to direction and script-writing based on their experience with the anime development staff, which resulted in the changes to the narrative found in the Re;Birth games on PlayStation Vita.

== Release history ==
Hyperdimension Neptunia is the first game within the series, with the name originally derived from the scrapped Sega Neptune which combined the Sega Mega Drive/Genesis and Sega 32X into one unit, originally scheduled for release in 1994 or 1995 before the project was dropped after the release of the Sega Saturn.

There are two sequels which have been released under the names Hyperdimension Neptunia Mk2 and Hyperdimension Neptunia Victory. Another game, titled Hyperdimension Neptunia PP (神次元アイドル ネプテューヌPP, Kamijigen Aidoru Neputyūnu PP), was released on June 20, 2013, for the PlayStation Vita in Japan and it was released in the west in June 2014 as Hyperdimension Neptunia: Producing Perfection, developed by Compile Heart, Idea Factory and Tamsoft.

During a streamed interview at Tokyo Game Show 2013, Idea Factory and Compile Heart announced that Hyperdimension Neptunia Re;Birth 2: Sisters Generation was under development. Re;Birth 2 was released on March 20, 2014. Hyperdevotion Noire: Goddess Black Heart (超女神信仰ノワール 激神ブラックハート, Chō Megami Shinkō Nowāru Geki-Shin Burakkuhāto) with Noire as the main character, was released on May 29, 2014.

On March 16, 2014, two new next-generation games were announced, titled Hyperdimension Neptunia U: Action Unleashed (超次元アクション ネプテューヌU) and Megadimension Neptunia VII (新次元ゲイム ネプテューヌVII). Hyperdimension Neptunia U: Action Unleashed is an action game spin-off exclusively for the PlayStation Vita released on August 28, 2014, in Japan, developed by Tamsoft, whilst Megadimension Neptunia VII is a main series title for the PlayStation 4.

At Tokyo Game Show 2014, an enhanced remake of Hyperdimension Neptunia Victory for the PlayStation Vita, titled Hyperdimension Neptunia Re;Birth 3: V Century, was announced.

== Games ==
Release timeline
2010	Hyperdimension Neptunia
2011	Hyperdimension Neptunia mk2
2012	Hyperdimension Neptunia Victory
2013	Hyperdimension Neptunia: Producing Perfection
2013	Hyperdimension Neptunia Re;Birth 1
2013	Neptunia Collection
2014	Hyperdimension Neptunia Re;Birth 2: Sisters Generation
2014	Hyperdevotion Noire: Goddess Black Heart
2014	Hyperdimension Neptunia U: Action Unleashed
2014	Hyperdimension Neptunia Re;Birth 3: V Generation
2015	Megadimension Neptunia VII
2015	MegaTagmension Blanc + Neptune VS Zombies
2015	Superdimension Neptune vs Sega Hard Girls
2016
2017	Cyberdimension Neptunia: 4 Goddesses Online
2017	Neptunia & Friends
2017	Nep-Nep★Connect: Chaos Champloo
2017	Megadimension Neptunia VIIR
2018	Super Neptunia RPG
2018	Hyperdimension Neptunia Re;Birth 1 Plus
2019	MegaMiracle Force
2019	Neptunia Shooter
2020	Neptunia Virtual Stars
2020	Neptunia re★Verse
2021	Neptunia x Senran Kagura: Ninja Wars
2022	Dimension Tripper Neptune: Top Nep
2022	Neptunia: Sisters VS Sisters
2023	Neptunia Game Maker R:Evolution
2024	Neptunia Riders VS Dogoos
2025
2026	Hyperspace Neptunia Unlimited

=== Main series ===
==== Hyperdimension Neptunia (2010) ====
The game that introduced the series premise. Since its release, the game's story has always remained standalone in the isolated "Superdimension", never receiving a true sequel, as the games from mk2 onwards take place in a separate "Hyperdimension" universe with its own storylines, direct sequels and connected multiverses.

The game was remade as Hyperdimension Neptunia Re;Birth 1 released in 2013 with a modestly rewritten story and a combat system inspired more by Victory, Hyperdimension Neptunia Re;Birth 1 Plus in 2018, and Neptunia re★Verse in 2020, which in itself is based on the first Re;Birth game.

==== Hyperdimension Neptunia mk2 (2011) ====
The second game in the series and first to introduce the Hyperdimension timeline. It introduced gameplay mechanics, new characters, and lore reinterpretations of the previous ones, rebooting the storyline which has since become the mainline universe for the rest of the series. The game's plot tackles more about the major consequences of video game piracy, albeit presented in a black-and-white manner, while maintaining a slightly darker tone and serious storyline, albeit occasionally interjected with moe' tropes of its era.

It was later remade as Hyperdimension Neptunia Re; Birth 2: Sisters Generation which was initially released in 2014 for PlayStation Vita and Steam with slightly more content and a revamped combat system to fall more in line with Victory.

==== Hyperdimension Neptunia Victory (2012) ====
The third game in the series, in which Hyperdimension's Neptune finds herself crashing head first into an alternate dimension called the "Ultradimension" that is based around gaming culture around the early generations until the sixth-generation era of gaming, while returning to the series more comical tone.

It received an enhanced version for the PlayStation Vita and Steam as Hyperdimension Neptunia Re;Birth 3: V Generation which was initially released in 2014 with minimal changes to combat and added story scenes for postgame and an extended prologue taking place before Neptune's comical fall into the Ultradimension.

==== Megadimension Neptunia VII (2015) ====
The first game in the series for PlayStation 4 released worldwide in 2016. The game's plot is slightly inspired by the shift from the seventh generation of consoles to the 8th generation, as well as the history of the Sega Dreamcast.

The game received a remake, framed as a retelling of the True Ending route, in 2017 as Megadimension Neptunia VIIR which featured new cutscenes with VR support. Released on the same platforms as the original (except for the Nintendo Switch, which still received the original release).

==== Hyperspace Neptunia Unlimited (2026) ====
The first new mainline game in eleven years, focusing on new CPUs based on the 9th generation consoles, with Neptune herself stuck in a time loop. The gameplay takes after Neptunia's shift to RPG-Action first introduced in Sisters vs. Sisters and a more open world/open zone style exploration with flight mechanics.

The game is set to release on PS4 (digital only), PS5, Switch, and Switch 2 in Japan by August 27, with a western release expected sometime in 2027.

=== Spin-offs ===
==== Hyperdimension Neptunia: Producing Perfection (2013) ====
An idol-raising simulator game with rhythm and dating sim elements. It is the first game in the series to be on the PlayStation Vita and was the only game in the series to not receive a port to PCs. The game is deliberately non-canon.

==== Neptunia Collection (2013) ====
An online mobile card game for Android and iOS developed by Idea Factory and hosted by GREE starting from February 15, 2013. It is a collectible card game which involves social networking elements. The game's servers shut down on July 31, 2014.

==== Hyperdevotion Noire: Goddess Black Heart (2014) ====
Turn-based tactical role-playing game which utilizes a battle grid, and stars Noire as the protagonist.

==== Hyperdimension Neptunia U: Action Unleashed (2014) ====
Musou-style action game. The game is deliberately non-canon.

==== MegaTagmension Blanc + Neptune VS Zombies (2015) ====
Spiritual sequel to Neptunia U while also featuring multiplayer game.

==== Superdimension Neptune vs Sega Hard Girls (2015) ====
Crossover RPG with the Sega Hard Girls franchise with an isolated narrative away from the main series starring IF-chan as the protagonist. The gameplay is inspired by those of the Re;Birth games.

==== Cyberdimension Neptunia: 4 Goddesses Online (2017) ====
Action RPG based on a fictional MMORPG within the series universe, in which all of the goddesses play in their freetime together. Although the game is called "online", it is a single player game with optional multiplayer missions, meaning no online requirement for its story content.

==== Neptunia & Friends (2017) ====
Interaction/Card game released in Japan for Android and iOS. The localized version was released exclusively for iOS and featured less characters and updates compared to the Japanese version.

==== Nep-Nep★Connect: Chaos Champloo (2017) ====
Free-to-play card battle game, and the first Neptunia game to not be released outside Japan. The game's support was terminated on August 8, 2018. Though it wasn't released outside Japan, the English version of Neptunia Virtual Stars gives this game the name "Nep-Nep★Connect: Chaos Champloo" when referring to characters that debuted in this game in its collectible card list.

==== Super Neptunia RPG (2018) ====
2D side-scrolling action game. First title in the series to be developed outside Japan, and the first Neptunia title that was released on a Nintendo platform.

==== Neptunia Shooter (2019) ====
2D bullet hell game. For the Neptunia series, this title is a number of firsts: first exclusively on PC, the first released worldwide on the same day, and the first to be developed by Idea Factory International, and the first game to be published by Idea Factory in Japan instead of Compile Heart. It was ported to PlayStation 5 alongside Neptunia re★Verse.

==== Neptunia Virtual Stars (2020) ====
A hack 'n' slash game with rhythm elements that tackles and parodies culture around social media, featuring various Vtubers. The first game in the series not to receive an English dub due to the amount of guest Vtubers present.

==== Neptunia x Senran Kagura: Ninja Wars (2021) ====
Isolated crossover with the Senran Kagura series that still takes after other Tamsoft Neptunia action games like Neptunia U. The second game in the series not to receive an English dub.

==== Dimension Tripper Neptune: Top Nep (2022) ====
Arcade-inspired rail shooter taking after Space Harrier, starring Ultradimension's adult Neptune and a small selection of SEGA-inspired 16-bit remixes of the main series' popular OST tracks.

The game remains exclusive to PC and was developed by Idea Factory in collaboration with Frontier Works, WSS Playground and tiny cactus studio.

Like Neptunia Shooter, it doesn't contain a story.

==== Neptunia: Sisters vs. Sisters (2022) ====
Canon side-story Action-RPG starring the CPU candidates after the events of VII as they go up against a goddess of mobile gaming while also dealing with an outbreak that kept everyone inside their homes for two years, parodying smartphone culture in the process. For the first time, the character models and assets have been remade from scratch in the Unity Engine, while also doing away with the habit of dungeon level design recycling of the earlier released Neptunia RPGs.

It was released in Japan on April 21, 2022, for PlayStation 4 and PlayStation 5. A Western version has been released in January 2023, adding PC via Steam to platforms. It also released for Xbox One and Xbox Series X/S on May 21, 2024. This is the first game to have an English dub since the release of Super Neptunia RPG, and the first to release on Xbox platforms. The Switch version also released with two exclusive playable characters.

==== Neptunia Game Maker R:Evolution (2023) ====
Canonical spin-off side-story also following the events after VII starring Ultradimension's adult Neptune in which she manages a game company to help faded goddess based on the Apple Pippin, Atari Jaguar and the 3DO. Gameplay builds on the RPG-Action mechanics introduced in Sisters vs. Sisters, while putting a somewhat stronger emphasis on game development.

First released in 2023 in Japan for PS5, PS4, and Switch, it launched worldwide on May 14, 2024, followed by an Xbox Series X/S release on October 29, 2024.

==== Neptunia Riders VS Dogoos (2024) ====
A motorcycle action game, known in Japanese as Neptunia VS Titan Dogoo. It was released in Japan for PS5, PS4, and Switch in Japan on June 27, 2024, and was released worldwide on January 28, 2025.

== Other media ==
- Hyperdimension Neptunia
- Genre: Fantasy
- Manga

Choujigen Game Neptune: Megami Tsuushin
- Magazine: Famitsu Comic Clear
- Original run: November 2010 – December 2013
- Novel series

Hyperdimension Neptunia: High School
- Written by: Okazu
- Illustrated by: Tsunako, Urimo
- Published by: Hifumi Shobo
- Imprint: Sakura no Mori Bunko
- Original run: February 2, 2012 – present
- Volumes: 5
- Novel

Hyperdimension Neptunia TGS Hono no Futsukakan
- Written by: Rentarow, Yayoi
- Imprint: MF Bunko J
- Published: May 25, 2013
- Manga

Hyperdimension Neptunia: The Animation – Hello New World
- Written by: Mikage Baku
- Magazine: Dengeki Maoh
- Original run: June 2013 – present
- Anime television series

Hyperdimension Neptunia: The Animation
- Directed by: Masahiro Mukai
- Produced by: Shinsaku Tanaka; Kōhei Miyajima; Shintarō Yoshitake; Shō Fujimaru; Takehiko Sasaki
- Written by: Shōgo Yasukawa
- Music by: Hiroaki Tsutsumi; Kenji Kaneko; Masaru Yokoyama
- Studio: David Production
- Licensed by: Crunchyroll; AUS: Madman Entertainment
- Original network: Animax, Tokyo MX, KBS Kyoto, tvk, BS11, SUN
- English network: SEA: Animax Asia; US: Funimation Channel, Crunchyroll Channel
- Original run: July 12, 2013 – September 27, 2013
- Episodes: 12 + OVA
- Original video animation

Neptune's Summer Vacation
- Directed by: Masahiro Mukai
- Written by: Shōgo Yasukawa
- Studio: Okuruto Noboru
- Released: July 8, 2019
- Runtime: 26 minutes
- Original video animation

Nep-Nep Festival
- Directed by: Masahiro Mukai
- Written by: Shōgo Yasukawa
- Studio: Okuruto Noboru
- Released: December 15, 2021
- Runtime: 25 minutes
- Original video animation

Little Purple Sunshine
- Directed by: Masahiro Mukai
- Written by: Shōgo Yasukawa
- Studio: Okuruto Noboru
- Released: July 3, 2022
- Runtime: 23 minutes

=== Manga ===
A manga series based on the game titled Choujigen Game Neptune: Megami Tsuushin (超次元ゲイム ネプテューヌ ~めがみつうしん~) began serialisation in November 2010 within the Famitsu Comic Clear.

A manga series illustrated by Mikage Baku which complements the television animation, titled Hyperdimension Neptunia: The Animation – Hello New World (超次元ゲイム ネプテューヌ THE ANIMATION はろーにゅーわーるど), began serialisation within the June 2013 issue of Dengeki Maoh. A spin-off novel of the anime, titled Hyperdimension Neptunia TGS Hono no Futsukakan, was published by MF Bunko J and released May 25, 2013.

=== Anime ===
An anime adaptation, Hyperdimension Neptunia: The Animation, was produced by David Production of Japan and directed by Masahiro Mukai. Series composition and script writing are done by Shōgo Yasukawa and a musical score composed by Hiroaki Tsutsumi, Kenji Kaneko and Masaru Yokoyama. Character designs are done by Hitomi Takechi, based on the original designs by Tsunako along with art direction by Masanobu Nomura and sound direction by Jin Aketagawa. The twelve-episode series aired on Tokyo MX on July 12, 2013, and were later aired on BS11, KBS, Sun TV and tvk then finished on September 27, 2013. The series was acquired by Funimation for online streaming in North America with both the English dub and the original Japanese dub with English subtitles. The opening theme is "Dimension tripper!!!!" by nao and the ending theme is "Neptune☆Sagashite" (ネプテューヌ☆サガして) by Afilia Saga. "Go→Love&Peace" by Ayane is used as the ending theme of episodes 3 and 4, in addition to "Ito" (糸; literally "yarn") by Afilia Saga on episode 10. It was broadcast within the United States on Funimation Channel.

A new original video animation (OVA) titled Nepu no Natsuyasumi was announced to be in production. Returning staff members include Masahiro Mukai as director, Hitomi Takechi as character designer, and Shōgo Yasukawa as scriptwriter, with animation by studio Okuruto Noboru. It premiered on July 8, 2019. A second OVA titled Nep Nep Darake no Festival was bundled with "Dimensional Traveler Neptune Generator Unit ver." 1/7 scale figure, which was released on December 15, 2021. A third OVA titled Hidamari no Little Purple was bundled with the "Neptune Little Purple ver." 1/7-scale figure, which was released on July 3, 2022.

The anime television series adaptation received a mixed response, with praise for its original story and humor revolving around video game industry in-jokes, and criticism for its use of melodrama.

=== Music ===
Most of the original soundtracks created for the Neptunia series were composed by Kenji Kaneko, with additional composers for Megadimension Neptunia VII and later games. The first, titled Hyperdimension Neptunia Sound Track CD, was released on August 19, 2010, and was bundled with a Japanese Limited Edition of the game. The soundtrack for the second game contained 13 tracks and was released in Japan with the limited edition on August 18, 2011. It was later repackaged with the western limited release on February 28, 2012, which featured 18 tracks and was titled Hyperdimension Neptunia mk2: Sounds of Gamindustri. The soundtrack for Hyperdimension Neptunia Victory was released on August 30, 2012, with the Japanese Limited Edition and contained 16 tracks. Similar to the second game, the soundtrack was released overseas with the Limited Edition of the game with 24 tracks, titled Hyperdimension Neptunia Victory Sounds of that other Gamindustri. The Megadimension VII soundtrack, MEGADIMENSION NEPTUNIA VII Dream Edition DG-ROM, was included with the Japanese Dream Edition and released in a 50 track, 3 disc format on April 23, 2015. Its overseas release, MEGADIMENSION NEPTUNIA Official Soundtrack was included exclusively with the Limited Edition online, containing only 45 tracks over 2 discs. The soundtrack for 4 Goddesses Online was released on February 9, 2017, with the Royal Edition of the game.

For each title in the Re;Birth series, the soundtracks were re-released following each game's initial release, usually with a few additional or missing tracks. Re;Birth 2's soundtrack, titled Hyperdimension Neptunia Re;Birth2: SISTERS GENERATION ~ "Sisters' Melodies" Soundtrack CD was released exclusively on Idea Factory International's website with the Limited Edition of the game and contained 19 tracks from the game. Compile Heart and Idea Factory International later made the Re;Birth series available for the PC on the Steam platform, in which DLC included digital releases of the soundtrack for each game.

In addition to the game soundtracks, there have been CD single releases for the opening and ending themes for each game. The voice actresses for each character have also released individual singles, in which they perform original in-character songs. Various Drama CD series have also been released in which voice actors perform original episodes. The anime series also released singles for the opening and ending themes, alongside a drama CD and 7 special "Animation Processor" discs, which contained a variety of different audio media including songs, voice actor commentary, and drama episodes.

A compilation of the main vocal tracks from each game (including character songs) was released as a 5 disc series on August 27, 2014.

=== Mobile applications ===
Alarm clock applications and mobile skins/themes featuring Neptunia characters have also been released for Android and iOS.

== Reception ==
Aggregate review scores
Game	Metacritic
Hyperdimension Neptunia	(PS3) 45/100
Hyperdimension Neptunia mk2	(PS3) 53/100
Hyperdimension Neptunia Victory	(PS3) 55/100
Hyperdimension Neptunia: Producing Perfection	(VITA) 54/100
Hyperdimension Neptunia Re;Birth 1	(VITA) 69/100 (PC) 72/100
Hyperdimension Neptunia Re;Birth 2: Sisters Generation	(VITA) 67/100
Hyperdevotion Noire: Goddess Black Heart	(VITA) 68/100 (PC) 65/100
Hyperdimension Neptunia U: Action Unleashed	(VITA) 71/100 (PC) 50/100
Hyperdimension Neptunia Re;Birth 3: V Generation	(VITA) 70/100
Megadimension Neptunia VII	(PS4) 71/100
MegaTagmension Blanc + Neptune VS Zombies	(VITA) 61/100
Superdimension Neptune vs Sega Hard Girls	(VITA) 72/100
Cyberdimension Neptunia: 4 Goddesses Online	(PS4) 71/100
Megadimension Neptunia VIIR	(PS4) 71/100
Super Neptunia RPG	(NS) 62/100 (PS4) 60/100 (PC) 80/100
Neptunia Virtual Stars	(PS4) 56/100
Neptunia x SENRAN KAGURA: Ninja wars	(NS) 65/100
Neptunia Sisters vs Sisters	(PS5) 65/100
Neptunia Game Maker R:Evolution	(PS5) 58/100
