= Hyperdimension Neptunia mk2 =

2011 video game

- European Box Art
- Developers: Idea Factory; Compile Heart; Felistella (Re;Birth2)
- Publishers: JP: Compile Heart; WW: NIS America (PS3); WW: Idea Factory International (Re;Birth2)
- Artist: Tsunako
- Series: Hyperdimension Neptunia
- Engine: PhyreEngine
- Platforms: PlayStation 3; PlayStation 4; PlayStation Vita; Windows; Nintendo Switch
- Release: August 18, 2011: PlayStation 3; JP: August 18, 2011; EU: February 24, 2012; NA: February 28, 2012 Re;Birth2 Vita; JP: March 20, 2014; NA: January 27, 2015; EU: January 28, 2015 Windows; WW: May 29, 2015 Nintendo Switch; JP: May 24, 2024 PlayStation 4; JP: August 7, 2024; WW: October 28, 2025
- Genre: Role-playing
- Mode: Single-player

Hyperdimension Neptunia mk2 (超次元ゲイム ネプテューヌmk2, Chōjigen Geimu Neputyūnu mk2; lit. Super Dimensional Game Neptune mk2) is a 2011 role-playing video game developed by Idea Factory and Compile Heart, the second installment in the Hyperdimension Neptunia franchise. This sequel contains both new and returning characters, and the gameplay has been updated so as to remove the random encounter feature. New maps and a brand new world are featured as well, and the cutscenes have been upgraded from the old 2D visual novel style cutscenes.

A portable remaster titled Hyperdimension Neptunia Re;Birth2: Sisters Generation was made and released for the PlayStation Vita in 2014–2015 globally, later also for Windows. Hyperdimension Neptunia mk2 was followed by Hyperdimension Neptunia Victory (2012).

== Gameplay ==
=== Dungeon gameplay ===
While in a dungeon, various actions can be performed, mainly the Treasure Search and the Symbol Attack. When the O button is pressed, the player scans the area to find hidden treasure. Enemies now wander the map, and when the player character comes within their sight range, a red exclamation point will appear (a play on Metal Gear Solid), and they will chase the player. Hitting it with a Symbol Attack gives the player's party the upper hand, and may sometimes even defeat the enemy. If the latter occurs, no rewards are gained. Likewise, if the player character is approached from behind, the battle will start with a Back Attack and the enemy will gain the advantage. Other items within dungeons include Sharicite Symbols that trigger events, Save Points, Common Items, Gathering Points that release ingredients for item synthesis, and a dungeon exit.

=== Battle gameplay ===
When the player comes in contact with an enemy on the field or during an event, battle starts. Each character's turn is gauged by their AP, or Action Points. Normal attacks and items consume AP until the points run out, after which the character's turn ends.

Each character is also assigned SP, or Skill Points, for performing skills or activating HDD (Hard Drive Divinity) in the case of the CPUs (Console Patron Units, the goddesses) or the CPU Candidates. Skills vary in range, effect, and attack power. One skill can be used per turn, after which the character's turn ends, regardless of current AP remaining. HDD requires 100 SP to activate. This is done by using the HDD ON command, and once activated, the character will regularly consume SP until it runs out, after which the character will revert. Up to 100 SP can also be carried in between battles.

Movement is gauged by a blue circle around the character. This marks the area within which the controlled character may move. Certain normal moves may shorten this circle, limiting further movement. The turn order of the battle is controlled with the Agility stat. The higher a character's Agility, the sooner their turn will come.

The command menu is used for performing various actions. The character may perform normal attacks, use skills, activate HDD (only CPUs and CPU Candidates), or end their turn. They may also switch between standby characters using AP and SP, escape from unscripted battles (dependent on Luck stat), or use items.

As in the first game, draining an enemy's GP, or Guard Points, forces that target into Guard Break mode. In this state, the defense stat and resistances of the target are significantly reduced until the enemy's GP completely recovers. GP depletes faster when a Break attack is used.

Normal combos can be edited by inserting extra commands. These commands appear after the first normal attack. Normal combos branch off into three types: Rush, Heavy Hits, and Break. Rush attacks usually involve high hit counts. Heavy Hits usually deplete enemy HP faster. Break attacks usually deplete enemy GP faster. By executing certain commands in specific patterns and consuming a set amount of AP, a combo finisher called an EX Finish is performed. The type of EX Finish is usually related to the command used to execute it.

Status conditions can affect combat. Whenever a target is affected by Poison, they continuously receive 1/16th of their max health in damage. Likewise, Heal continuously recovers 1/16th of their max health instead. When affected by Skillseal, Skills are disabled. When affected by Paralysis, the character is immobile and their turn is skipped. When a CPU or CPU Candidate is affected by Virus, the HDD ON command becomes locked, and if the target is in HDD, they forcibly revert.

=== Other elements ===
The Chirper (a play on Twitter) serves as the main communication system in each landmass. This allows the player to view what the NPCs in that landmass are talking about. NPCs with chat bubbles highlighted in purple indicate events.

When the player visits the Guild located in each landmass, they may accept quests. The quest types range between defeating a certain number of enemies to collecting a certain number of items. Once a quest is completed and reported, the player receives rewards denoted by the posted quest, and the CPU Shares for that city are altered.

Item synthesis can take place in every landmass. Once the recipe for a certain item is obtained, the player may craft that item in the synthesis shop by consuming the required ingredients that a recipe calls for. In some cases, to synthesize an item, a specific character's Lily Rank must be high enough to begin synthesis.

Shops may be used to purchase items. The inventory of a shop will increase over time as the game progresses further into the story. Shops sell a variety of items from armor to equipment to synthesis items. Items may be purchased using Credits, which are gained by certain events and winning battles.

The Lily Rank allows the player to check each character's affection level for Nepgear. Increasing Lily Rank is important, as it enables certain items to be synthesized, and in many cases, determines the ending (or endings) you receive at the end of the game. The Lily Rank system also causes certain events to occur based on a character's Lily Rank. Lily Rank may also be increased simply by viewing certain events.

Nepgear's HDD outfit can be edited with the Costume Canvas. By uploading pictures from the PS3 hard drive to the game, her outfit can be modified based on the template uploaded.

== Plot ==
=== Story ===
The year is 20XX, and in an alternate universe from the first game, where Arfoire is dead, a force known as ASIC (Arfoire Syndicate of International Crime), a group solely dedicated towards the deceased Arfoire, has risen, led by CFW Magic. Over the years, the influence of ASIC has become increasingly powerful, currently affecting many residents of Gamindustri. As such, in response to the threat, the CPUs and Nepgear travel to the Gamindustri Graveyard to combat ASIC. However, the five of them are overpowered and captured. Three years later, IF and Compa arrive to find Neptune. With the power of the Sharicite, a crystal made from the hopes of people, the two manage to free Nepgear and escape, though the Sharicite is broken in the process. Retreating to Planeptune, Nepgear must recover her strength and free Gamindustri from the influence of ASIC, though she must first locate the mascots of the landmasses, who can provide the power to potentially assist the captive CPUs.

As she travels Gamindustri to find the mascots, she crosses paths with Nisa, Gust, 5pb, Cave, and Falcom, as well as the other CPU Candidates, who she befriends. They eventually join Nepgear's party, and together with the power of the mascots, they manage to free their captive sisters. The members of ASIC fall by their hand as well, though they uncover a sinister plot to use their power to revive Arfoire. Making their way to the Gamindustri Graveyard for the last time, Nepgear's party defeats Arfoire, and the CPUs attempt to seal the entity forever.

=== Settings ===
Because of the game being in a new dimension to the first one, the four landmasses have undergone changes. Each area introduces new NPC's, and certain NPCs have moved landmasses from the first game.

==== Planeptune ====
The original hub world used in the first game, as well as Neptune's first location. The entire landmass contains more of a futuristic feel compared to the first game. Histoire, as its Oracle, has saved the landmass numerous times, and has become famous among the citizens because of it. Due to Nepgear's work, Planeptune has become the least affected of the four landmasses. Nepgear (Purple Sister), Compa, IF, Neptune (Purple Heart) and various NPC's reside here.

==== Lastation ====
A direct reference to the PlayStation series, due to the majority of the landmass's buildings being colored black. It is usually described as steampunk, and has become slightly more industrialized since the first game. Least affected by the influence of ASIC, due to preparations beforehand. Acts as a major trade center for the other landmasses. Uni (Black Sister), Nisa, Noire (Black Heart) and various NPC's reside here.

==== Lowee ====
A direct reference to the Wii, due to the majority of the landscape being colored white. Compared to the first Lowee, it seems more colorful. Highly threatened by the influence of ASIC. Houses various icons of the 2D era as well as previous CPU's of Lowee. Rom (White Sister), Ram (White Sister), Gust and Blanc (White Heart) reside here.

==== Leanbox ====
A direct reference to the Xbox, due to all the brown and bloom scenery. The buildings seem more simple, yet futuristic since the original Leanbox. They have employed a variety of countermeasures against ASIC, though it was only a temporary fix. Generally viewed as a military nation, and is a rival/trade partner of Lastation. Cave, 5pb., Vert (Green Heart) and various NPC's reside here.

==== Gamindustri Graveyard ====
This is an entirely new landmass created by Arfoire herself, due to her new powers. The landscape contains the ruins of notable artifacts in video game history, such as the Game Boy Advance. Not accessible through normal means. Three mysterious fairies, as well as ASIC (Arforie Syndicate of International Crime) reside here. This is also the location of the opening battle between the goddesses and Magic the Hard (CFW Magic in English version), though they are defeated, and the four goddesses and Nepgear are captured. However, three years later, Compa and IF help Nepgear escape.

== Characters ==
This sequel marks the first appearance of the CPU's younger sisters, the CPU Candidates. The story focuses on the younger sisters of Neptune (Purple Heart), Noire (Black Heart), and Blanc (White Heart), which are the CPU Candidates on a quest to save the goddesses (which are the CPU Candidates' older sisters) after they are defeated and captured by Arfoire. Most existing characters will return, as well as new main characters and supporting characters. The new main characters have the task of rescuing the goddesses or CPU from the first game.

- Nepgear: Known as Purple Sister, is the younger sister of Neptune (Purple Heart). Her name is a reference to the Game Gear.
- Uni: Known as Black Sister, is the younger sister of Noire (Black Heart). She is a reference to the Sony PlayStation Portable.
- Rom: Also known as White Sister, is the older one of Blanc's two younger sisters (White Heart). Her name is a reference to Read Only Memory. She and her sister are references to the two screens of a Nintendo DS.
- Ram: Known as White Sister, is the younger one of Blanc's two younger sisters (White Heart). Her name is a reference to Random Access Memory. She and her sister are references to the two screens of a Nintendo DS.

In addition to the original sisters, other characters that make return appearances include Compa, IF, 5pb,

Some of the new characters include:

Cave
Brand new NPC in mk2. She belongs to the Leanbox SMD (Special Missions Department), and is close friends with other Leanbox residents, such as 5pb. Self-conscious about herself, and has an inability to recognize faces. Representative of Cave Co., another video game company.

Falcom
New NPC representative of Nihon Falcom Corporation, a Japanese computer game company. An adventuress who travels Gamindustri and publishes books about her adventures under the alias A. Christin. She wields the sword Dragon Slayer, which is concealed in a violin case she carries on her back. Claims that she can't ignore evil. She also has a tendency to meddle with the affairs of others who cross her path.

Oracles

- Histoire (Histy): Appears in the first game; now she becomes the Oracle of Planeptune.
- Kei Jinguji (J.K.): The Oracle of Lastation.
- Mina Nishizawa: The Oracle of Lowee.
- Chika Hakozaki: The Oracle of Leanbox.

=== Appears in Mk2 ===
Nisa
Nisa appears in the original Mk2. She joins the party to stop the nefarious deeds of ASIC. Representative of Nippon Ichi Software

Gust
Gust appears in the original Mk2. She joins the party after restoring Lowee's mascot. Representative of former video game company Gust

=== Appears in Re;Birth2 Sisters Generation ===
Red
She is a young lesbian girl who constantly travels the world in search for "wifeys," eventually running into Nepgear and declaring her as first "wifey". Her name is directly derived from Red Entertainment. She takes the place of Nisa in Re;Birth2.
Broccoli
A little girl who has a sharp tongue and very intelligent. Her name is directly derived from Broccoli Co., Ltd. She takes the place of Gust in Re;Birth2.
Cyberconnect2
A girl who hails from Fukoka who joins the party in Lastation. Her name is derived from Cyberconnect2
MarvelousAQL
A busty kunoichi who joins the party in Lowee. Her name is derived from MarvelousAQL.
Tekken
A fighter who is also a masochist who joins the party in Leanbox. Her name is derived from the Tekken franchise.

=== Antagonists ===
Arfoire (the Deity of Sin)
The final boss, who is also the main antagonist in the first game of the series.

Four Felons
CFW Magic, CFW Judge, CFW Trick and CFW Brave respectively. They are members of the ASIC, whose only reason for existing is to revive Arfoire.

Linda (Underling)
Loyal soldier to ASIC, and serves under her boss, CFW Magic. No one ever really uses her real name. The official website refers to her as Underling. She willingly performs any mission handed to her, no matter how low. She repeatedly shows up to try to accomplish her goals and destroy the CPUs, though she is constantly defeated every time. She has been shown to make various allusions to games and otherwise.

Pirachu/Warechu (ワレチュー, Warechū)
A talking mouse, and member of ASIC.

== Development and release ==
The game was developed with assistance from Nippon Ichi Software, Gust Corporation, 5pb., and Comcept by Keiji Inafune. It is the sequel to the previous game named Hyperdimension Neptunia, announced on April 12, 2011 for the PlayStation 3. It was released on August 18, 2011 in Japan, and was released in February 2012 in the United States and Europe. This is the first and so far the only game in the series to receive a Mature rating from the ESRB in North America. Hyperdimension Neptunia mk2 was made available as a downloadable title on the PlayStation Network in August 2012.

=== Hyperdimension Neptunia Re;Birth2 ===
Hyperdimension Neptunia Re;Birth2: Sisters Generation is an enhanced portable version of the game for the PlayStation Vita developed by Felistella, announced by Idea Factory and Compile Heart during a streamed interview at Tokyo Game Show 2013. It was released on 20 March 2014 in Japan, and in January 2015 in North America and Europe. Re;Birth2 was released for PC on May 29, 2015. Nearly all of the original game's premises, such as story, missions and dungeons, were kept intact, however there were major changes in the game's visuals, such as the improved frame rate performance, sharper visuals and the usage of 2D character artworks in the dialogue scenes, replacing the 3D character models present in the original game. Akin to the previous PS Vita game from the series, Hyperdimension Neptunia Re;Birth 1, this game also utilises the battle system from Hyperdimension Neptunia Victory in addition to a "remake system" which unlocks special modifications to the game.

Re;Birth 2 brings a new selection of playable characters. In addition to most of the original mk2 cast, the game also features the characters representing game developer companies introduced in Hyperdimension Neptunia Victory, in addition to Cave, 5pb, Red, and the four Oracles of each continent; both Gust and Nisa have been removed from the game, however. The game also features a totally reworked English script and voice acting.

The intro theme song is "Kirihirake! Roleplay Star Girl" (きりひらけ！ロープレ☆スターガール) by Nao, and the credits theme song is "Never give up" by Ayane. Unlike the original, the ESRB rated the game with Teen.

Re;Birth 2 was ported to Nintendo Switch in Japan on May 23, 2024. An English release was planned for May 21, three days earlier than the Japanese version but was delayed indefinitely a day before release. On December 13, the English version was cancelled, with Idea Factory stating Nintendo had refused the release as they had "not complied with the Nintendo Guidelines. The game will release in English in 2025.

== Music ==
The opening theme is Kirihirake! Glazy☆Star (きりひらけ!グレイシー☆スター) performed by nao, the ending theme is GO→Love&Peace by Ayane, and an insert song is titled Crystal no Chikai (クリスタルの誓い) by YuiKaori.

== Reception ==
=== Hyperdimension Neptunia mk2 ===
Reception

Aggregate score
Aggregator	Score
Metacritic	53/100

Review scores
Publication	Score
Electronic Gaming Monthly	5/10
GamesRadar+	2.5/5 stars
RPGFan	60/100

The original version received mixed reviews. It received an aggregated score of 53/100 on Metacritic based on 16 reviews.

RPGFan said they found Hyperdiemsnion Neptunia mk2 superior to its predecessor in almost every aspect but still found it lacking in many areas. While they found the gameplay to be decent, they criticized the graphics, dialogue, humour, optimization, and level, quest, and enemy design. They also called out the game for sexualizing child characters and including child characters in sexual situations. They gave the game an overall score of 60/100.

GamesRadar+ rated the game 2.5/5 stars, criticizing its over sexualization of female characters, repetitive environments, poor camera movement, and abundance of anime tropes. Like RPGFan, they found this game improved on the gameplay compared to the original, particularly the combat and exploration. They also found the game's pacing to have somewhat improved from the first game. Despite this, they still didn't find the game to be fun.

=== Hyperdimension Neptunia Re;Birth 2: Sisters Generation ===
Reception

Aggregate scores
Aggregator	Score
GameRankings	PC: 58%
Metacritic	VITA: 67/100

Review score
Publication	Score
Famitsu	32/40

The PlayStation Vita rendition, Hyperdimension Neptunia Re;Birth2: Sisters Generation, was given a review score of 32/40 by Famitsu. During the first week of release in Japan, Re;Birth2 sold 26,845 physical retail copies.

In the West, it received mixed reviews. Aggregating review website Metacritic gave the PlayStation Vita version 67/100 based on 19 reviews, and GameRankings gave the Microsoft Windows version 58% based on 4 reviews.
