= Cyberdimension Neptunia: 4 Goddesses Online =

2017 role-playing video game

- Developers: Compile Heart; Tamsoft
- Publishers: JP: Idea Factory; WW: Idea Factory International
- Series: Hyperdimension Neptunia
- Engine: Unreal Engine 4
- Platforms: PlayStation 4, Microsoft Windows
- Release: PlayStation 4: JP: February 9, 2017; NA: October 10, 2017; PAL: October 13, 2017; Microsoft Windows: WW: February 28, 2018
- Genres: Action-adventure, hack and slash
- Modes: Single-player, multiplayer

Cyberdimension Neptunia: 4 Goddesses Online (四女神オンライン CYBER DIMENSION NEPTUNE, Yon Megami Onrain Cyber Dimension Neptune) is a 2017 action-adventure video game developed by Compile Heart and Tamsoft and published by Idea Factory International. Despite the title, the game is a single-player game with an online cooperative multiplayer option. This is the first Neptunia game to use Unreal Engine 4, as well as the first spin-off game to be released on the PlayStation 4 rather than the PlayStation Vita.

== Setting ==
A world known as Gamindustri (ゲイムギョウ界 Geimugyō-kai, a pun on ゲーム業界 Gēmu gyōkai, which is literally "game industry" in Japanese) protected by the divine aegis of the four CPUs (Console Patron Units, the goddesses) and their sisters, the CPU candidates. Most of the game takes place inside "4 Goddesses Online" a recurring fictional multiplayer online role-playing game that has been referenced throughout the series.

The setting of the game is the fantasy land of Alsgard, a vast world surrounded by verdant and gorgeous ocean.

=== Plot ===
The four CPUs were able to receive an early access code for the newest installment of the popular online game, "4 Goddesses Online", which uses the real forms of the CPUs as official models. Each CPU logs into the game with their own motives for playing the game.

Upon entering the game, they were approached by the guardian spirit, Bouquet, who is one of the game's non-playable characters that is equipped with the game's advanced artificial intelligence. They were told that they are the Chosen Ones that are tasked to save Alsgard from the Demon King Jester by awakening the four divine Goddesses of legend.

== Characters ==
Unlike the previous Tamsoft-made action games for the series, only the four CPUs, Neptune, Noire, Blanc and Vert, and their sisters Nepgear, Uni, Ram and Rom are the only ones playable, along with the four divine goddesses in the later parts of the story.

== Development ==
The game was announced in March 2016. In March 2017, the game was announced for an October 2017 release in English-speaking regions.

== Reception and sales ==
Reception

Aggregate score
Aggregator	Score
Metacritic	PS4: 71/100

The game was the third best-selling video game in Japan during its debut week, selling 42,508 copies.
