= Hyperdimension Neptunia Victory =

2012 video game

- European cover art
- Developers: Idea Factory; Compile Heart; Felistella (Re;Birth3)
- Publishers: JP: Compile Heart; WW: NIS America (PS3); WW: Idea Factory International (Re;Birth3)
- Artist: Tsunako
- Composers: Kenji Kaneko; Nobuo Uematsu; Kenji Ito
- Series: Hyperdimension Neptunia
- Platforms: PlayStation 3; PlayStation 4; PlayStation Vita; Microsoft Windows; Nintendo Switch
- Release: August 30, 2012: PlayStation 3; JP: August 30, 2012; NA: March 21, 2013; AU: March 21, 2013; EU: March 22, 2013 Re;Birth3 PlayStation Vita; JP: December 18, 2014; NA: June 30, 2015; EU: July 3, 2015 Microsoft Windows; WW: October 30, 2015 Nintendo Switch; JP: May 24, 2024 PlayStation 4; JP: August 7, 2024; WW: October 28, 2025
- Genre: Role-playing
- Mode: Single-player

Hyperdimension Neptunia Victory (神次元ゲイムネプテューヌV, Kami Jigen Game Neptune V; also known as Ultra Dimension Neptune V) is an action role-playing game developed and published by Idea Factory with the assistance of Compile Heart. It is the third installment in the Hyperdimension Neptunia franchise. Set in the year 1989, the story takes place after Hyperdimension Neptunia Mk2 in an alternate dimension to Gamindustri, bringing more insight to the "Console War" story arc. The game was released in Japan in August 2012 and in North America and Europe in 2013.

A portable remaster for the PlayStation Vita, titled Hyperdimension Neptunia Re;Birth3: V Century was released in Japan in December 2014, and worldwide under the subtitle of V Generation in 2015. It later released for Microsoft Windows and PlayStation 4. It was ported to Nintendo Switch in Japan on May 23, 2024 and though an English release was planned for May 21, three days earlier than the Japanese version it was delayed indefinitely a day before release. On December 13, the English version was cancelled, with Idea Factory stating Nintendo had refused the release as they had "not complied with the Nintendo Guidelines. The game was released in English in 2025.

== Gameplay ==
The gameplay is similar to its predecessor, Hyperdimension Neptunia Mk2, with a handful of changes. The AP bar is gone so now characters can customize their combos but they are limited to one combo per turn. CPU's and Candidates can activate Hard Drive Divinity at the cost of 20% of their SP. Also included is the EXE Drive Gauge which fills up by the number of hits in a combo. This gauge can be expanded upon three times for a total of four gauges. When the gauge is full, characters can utilize an EXE drive, which is the equivalent of a special move. Joint attacks cost more than one section of the gauge. In the remake, the EXE drive gauge is gone, so Special moves cost all SP, which is limited to 1,000.

== Music ==
The music for the game was composed by Kenji Kaneko. Nobuo Uematsu, along with his band Earthbound Papas, and Kenji Ito also contributed four songs each. The opening theme song is Kami Jigen! Fortune Material (神次元!ふぉーちゅん・まてりある) by nao of 5pb., and the ending theme is Venus Megamix! (ヴィーナス女神っくす!) by Afilia Saga.

The opening theme song of the Hyperdimension Neptunia Re;Birth 3: V Century remake is titled "Rave:tech(^_^)New;world", with vocals performed by nao and written by Shinchiro Yamashita, track composed by Ryu, and guitar by Demetori. And the ending theme is True End Player (トゥルーエンド プレイヤー) by Idol College.

== Reception ==
=== Original version ===
Reception

Aggregate score
Aggregator	Score
Metacritic	55/100

Review scores
Publication	Score
Destructoid	6.5/10
GamesRadar+	2.5/5
Hardcore Gamer	3/5
IGN	5.4/10
Push Square	6/10
RPGamer	2.5/5

The original version received mixed reviews. It received an aggregated score of 55/100 on Metacritic based on 19 reviews.

=== Remake version ===
Reception

Aggregate score
Aggregator	Score
Metacritic	VITA: 70/100

The remake received mixed reception, according to review aggregator Metacritic.

== See also ==
- Hyperdimension Neptunia: The Animation
