= Kaori Ishihara =

Japanese voice actress (born 1993)

- 石原 夏織
- Born: 6 August 1993 (age 33); Chiba, Japan
- Occupations: Voice actress; singer
- Years active: 2008–present
- Agent: Style Cube
- Notable work: Aikatsu! as Seira Otoshiro; Magi: The Labyrinth of Magic as Aladdin; Iroduku: The World in Colors as Hitomi Tsukishiro; Lagrange: The Flower of Rin-ne as Madoka Kyouno; Demon Lord, Retry! as Luna Elegant; The "Hentai" Prince and the Stony Cat. as Azusa Azuki; Sword Art Online: Alicization as Tiese Schtrinen; Our Last Crusade or the Rise of a New World as Nene Alkastone; Onimai as Mihari Oyama; Magia Record as Rena Minami
- Height: 151.7 cm (5 ft 0 in)
- Musical career
- Genres: J-Pop; Anison
- Instrument: Vocals
- Label: Pony Canyon
- Website: ishiharakaori.com

Kaori Ishihara (石原 夏織, Ishihara Kaori; born 6 August 1993) is a Japanese voice actress and singer managed by Style Cube. She was formerly part of Up-Front Agency in which she was involved with Happy! Style and Team Dekaris. She was affiliated with Sigma Seven from 2013 to 2017. She was a member of StylipS until April 2013, and YuiKaori alongside Yui Ogura. As a solo singer, she recorded several character songs for one of each characters. A couple of singles have charted on Oricon.

== Career ==
Ishihara is a member of the Japanese idol duo YuiKaori with Yui Ogura and she was also a part of the idol unit StylipS (also with Ogura, along with Arisa Noto and Maho Matsunaga), as well as pop group Happy Style Rookies. On June 30, 2017, YuiKaori suspended its musical activities to allow Ogura and Ishihara to focus on their individual careers. However, it was announced that their reunion event will be held on May 9, 2027.

Ishihara made her solo debut as a singer under Pony Canyon on March 21, 2018, with her first single "Blooming Flower". She held her first solo live titled "Sunny Spot Story" on 29 December 2018, and has continued to perform regularly, including her first overseas performance in 2025.

She released her third single titled "TEMPEST" on 17 July 2019. It was used as the opening theme song for the anime, Demon Lord, Retry!. Since then, she has continued to be in charge of theme songs for many anime series. She tried her hand at songwriting for the first time with the song "As I Am".

== Filmography ==
=== Television animation ===
Year	Title	Role	Notes
2010	Yumeiro Patissiere	Clara Hunt; Estragon	
2010	Maid-sama!	Suzuna Ayuzawa	
2010	Kissxsis	Woman	
2011	Aria the Scarlet Ammo	Reki	
2011	Double-J	Yutaka Toba	
2011	Mayo Chiki!	Miruku	
2012	Waiting in the Summer	Kanna Tanigawa	
2012	AKB0048	Himeko	
2012	Kokoro Connect	Yukina Kurihara	
2012	High School DXD	Murayama	
2012	So, I Can't Play H!	Mina Okura	
2012	Nakaimo - My Sister Is Among Them!	Konoe Tsuruma	
2012	Lagrange: The Flower of Rin-ne	Madoka Kyono	
2012	Lagrange: The Flower of Rin-ne 2	Madoka Kyono	
2012	Saki Achiga-hen Episode of Side-A	Ryūka Shimizudani	
2012	Magi: The Labyrinth of Magic	Aladdin	
2012	Campione!	Metis	
2012	Muv-Luv Alternative: Total Eclipse	Cui Yifei	
2013	AKB0048 next stage	Himeko	
2013	Aikatsu!	Seira Otoshiro	Season 2
2013	Hyperdimension Neptunia: The Animation	Ram	
2013	Teekyu	Udonko Kondo	Season 1, 2 and 3
2013	The "Hentai" Prince and the Stony Cat.	Azusa Azuki	
2013	Yuyushiki	Kōhai A	
2013	Nagi-Asu: A Lull in the Sea	Sayu Hisanuma	
2013	Magi: The Kingdom of Magic	Aladdin	
2013	Strike the Blood	Avrora Florestina	
2014	Aikatsu!	Seira Otoshiro	
2014	Z/X Ignition	Misaki Yuzuriha	
2014	Cross Ange	Rosalie	
2014	Girl Friend Beta	Yuzuko Hazuki	
2015	Baby Steps Season 2	Aki Shimizu	
2015	Gatchaman Crowds insight	Tsubasa Misudachi	
2015	Castle Town Dandelion	Kanade Sakurada	
2015	Teekyu	Udonko Kondō	Season 5 and 6
2015	Seraph of the End: Battle in Nagoya	Rika Inoue	
2015	Ultra Super Anime Time	Supica	
2016	Teekyu	Udonko Kondō	Season 7
2016	Kamisama Minarai: Himitsu no Cocotama	Nozomi Sakurai	
2016	Cardfight!! Vanguard G: Stride Gate	Lisa Ferris	
2017	Miss Kobayashi's Dragon Maid	Shouta Magatsuchi, Sasakibe	
2017	Schoolgirl Strikers	Tsubame Miyama	
2017	Akiba's Trip: The Animation	Boss	
2017	Teekyu	Udonko Kondō	Season 8 and 9
2018	Iroduku: The World in Colors	Hitomi Tsukishiro	
2018	Senran Kagura Shinovi Master -Tokyo Yōma-hen-	Yozakura	
2018	Sword Art Online: Alicization	Tiese Schtrinen	
2019	Mini Toji	Chie Setouchi	
2019	Demon Lord, Retry!	Luna Elegant	
2020	Magia Record: Puella Magi Madoka Magica Side Story	Rena Minami	
2020	If My Favorite Pop Idol Made It to the Budokan, I Would Die	Yumeri Mizumori	
2020	The Misfit of Demon King Academy	Elen Mihais	
2020	Our Last Crusade or the Rise of a New World	Nene Alkastone	
2021	Black Clover	Richita	
2021	Combatants Will Be Dispatched!	Black Lilith	
2021	Higehiro	Yuzuha Mishima	
2021	Miss Kobayashi's Dragon Maid S	Shouta Magatsuchi	
2021	Magia Record: Puella Magi Madoka Magica Side Story - The Eve of Awakening	Rena Minami	
2021	The Vampire Dies in No Time	Ta Chan	
2021	Ancient Girl's Frame	Jotis Pearl	
2022	Magia Record: Puella Magi Madoka Magica Side Story - Dawn of a Shallow Dream	Rena Minami	
2022	Miss Shachiku and the Little Baby Ghost	Lily	
2022	Vermeil in Gold	Sharol Iridescence	
2022	Tokyo Mew Mew New	Masha	
2022	Boruto: Naruto Next Generations	Mimi Inuzuka	
2023	Ningen Fushin: Adventurers Who Don't Believe in Humanity Will Save the World	Agate	
2023	Onimai: I'm Now Your Sister!	Mihari Oyama	
2023	The Dreaming Boy Is a Realist	Rin Shinomiya	
2024	The Foolish Angel Dances with the Devil	Lilia	
2024	The New Gate	Rashia Luzel	
2024	Love Is Indivisible by Twins	Shiena Amamiya	
2024	Magilumiere Magical Girls Inc.	Lily Aoi	
2024	PuniRunes Puni 2	Yuniko/Yunirun	
2025	The Water Magician	Lihya	
2025	Cultural Exchange with a Game Centre Girl	Hotaru Katsuragi	
2026	The Daughter of the Demon Lord Is Too Kind!	Melina	
2026	The Invisible Man and His Soon-to-Be Wife	Light	
2026	The 100 Girlfriends Who Really, Really, Really, Really, Really Love You	Chiyo Īn	Season 3

=== Film ===
- Pop in Q (2016) as Ruchia
- Digimon Adventure tri. (2017) as Bakumon
- Happy-Go-Lucky Days (2020) as Mika-chan
- My Tyrano: Together, Forever (2020)
- Miss Kobayashi's Dragon Maid: A Lonely Dragon Wants to Be Loved (2025) as Shouta Magatsuchi

=== OVA ===
- Code Geass: Akito the Exiled as Alice Shaing
- Senran Kagura Estival Versus OVA as Yozakura
- Kaijuu Girls (Black) as Nova

=== Video games ===
2011

- Hyperdimension Neptunia Mk2, Ram
- Food Fantasy, Candy Cane, Margarita, White Truffle

2012

- Mugen Souls, Welsh
- Hyperdimension Neptunia Victory, Ram

2013

- Disgaea D2: A Brighter Darkness, Sicily
- Exstetra, Shiho
- Fairy Fencer F, Tiara
- Mugen Souls Z, Welsh
- Hyperdimension Neptunia Re;Birth1, Ram
- Senran Kagura Shinovi Versus, Yozakura
- Sorcery Saga: Curse of the Great Curry God, Punī
- Hyperdimension Neptunia: Producing Perfection, Ram
- Ys: Memories of Celceta, Carna

2014

- Hyperdevotion Noire: Goddess Black Heart, Tiara
- Hyperdimension Neptunia Re;Birth2: Sisters Generation, Ram
- Hyperdimension Neptunia U: Action Unleashed, Ram
- Dekamori Senran Kagura, Yozakura
- Super Heroine Chronicle, Reki

2015

- Senran Kagura: Estival Versus – Yozakura
- Shironeko Project, Shizuku Enju
- Megadimension Neptunia VII, Ram
- MegaTagmension Blanc + Neptune vs Zombies, Ram
- Fairy Fencer F Advent Dark Force, Tiara

2016

- Granblue Fantasy, Juliet

2017

- Cyberdimension Neptunia: 4 Goddesses Online, Ram
- Digimon Story: Cyber Sleuth – Hacker's Memory - Wormmon/Sistermon Noir
- Magia Record: Puella Magi Madoka Magica Side Story - Rena Minami
- Xenoblade Chronicles 2 - Floren (Japanese: ホタル, Hotaru)
- School Girl/Zombie Hunter, Rei Kanazaki

2019

- Arknights, Heavyrain

2020

- Moe! Ninja Girls RPG, Oka Kazamatsuri

2022

- Fairy Fencer F: Refrain Chord, Tiara
- Goddess of Victory: Nikke, Frima
- Return to Shironagasu Island, Akira Edgworth
- Neptunia: Sisters vs Sisters, Ram

2023

- Neptunia: Game Maker R:Evolution, Ram

2024

- Zenless Zone Zero , Fairy

2025

- Umamusume: Pretty Derby, Almond Eye

2026

- Nekopara: Sekai Connect, Soufflé

2027

- Melty Blood: Twi-Lumina, Len and White Len

=== Dubbing ===
- Planzet (2010) as Koyomi Akejima
- Long Way North as Nadya

== Discography ==
=== Singles ===
Year	Title	Details	Peak Oricon chart positions	Album
2018	"Blooming Flower"	Released: 21 March 2018; Label: Pony Canyon; Catalog no.: PCCG-01661, 70417; Format: CD	12	Sunny Spot
2018	"Ray Rule"	Released: 11 July 2018; Label: Pony Canyon; Catalog no.: PCCG-01684, 70426; Format: CD	13	Sunny Spot
2019	"TEMPEST"	Released: 17 July 2019; Label: Pony Canyon; Catalog no.: PCCG-01797, 70455; Format: CD	16	Water Drop
2019	"Face to Face"	Released: 13 November 2019; Label: Pony Canyon; Catalog no.: PCCG-01831, 01832; Format: CD	10	Water Drop
2020	"Against."	Released: 4 November 2020; Label: Pony Canyon; Catalog no.: PCCG-01945, 01946; Format: CD	11	Calm Scene
2021	"Plastic Smile"	Released: 21 April 2021; Label: Pony Canyon; Catalog no.: PCCG-01967, 01968; Format: CD	14	Calm Scene
2021	"Starcast"	Released: 24 November 2021; Label: Pony Canyon; Catalog no.: PCCG-02068, 02069; Format: CD	18	Calm Scene
2022	"Cherish"	Released: 27 April 2022; Label: Pony Canyon; Catalog no.: PCCG-02108, 02109; Format: CD	15	Calm Scene
2022	"Musouteki Chronicle" (夢想的クロニクル)	Released: 3 August 2022; Label: Pony Canyon; Catalog no.: PCCG-02158, 02159; Format: CD	16	Calm Scene
2022	"Abracada-Boo"	Released: 3 August 2022; Label: Pony Canyon; Catalog no.: PCCG-02160, 02161; Format: CD	15	Calm Scene
2023	"Paraglider"	Released: 2 August 2023; Label: Pony Canyon; Catalog no.: PCCG-02265, 02266; Format: CD	15	Calm Scene

=== Albums ===
Year	Title	Details	Peak Oricon chart positions
2018	Sunny Spot	Released: 14 November 2018; Label: Pony Canyon; Catalog No.: PCCG-01720, 01721, 01722; Format: CD, CD+DVD, CD+BD	13
2020	Water Drop	Released: 5 August 2020; Label: Pony Canyon; Catalog No.: PCCG-01926, 01927, 01928; Format: CD, CD+DVD, CD+BD	9
2024	Calm Scene	Released: 24 April 2024; Label: Pony Canyon; Catalog No.: PCCG-02352, 02353, SCCG-00161; Format: CD	14

=== EPs ===
Year	Title	Details	Peak Oricon chart positions
2025	As I Am	Released: 2 July 2025; Label: Pony Canyon; Catalog No.: SCCG-00172, PCCG-02445; Format: CD, CD+DVD, CD+BD	20
2026	ASOVIVA!!!	Released: 25 March 2026; Label: Pony Canyon; Catalog No.: SCCG-00192, PCCG-02497; Format: CD	

=== Video Releases ===
Title	Details	Peak Oricon Chart Position
Ishihara Kaori 1st LIVE Sunny Spot Story	Released: 17 April 2019; Label: Pony Canyon; Catalog No.: PCXP-50640 (BD edition), PCBP-53773 (DVD edition); Format: BD, DVD	15(BD) 27(DVD)
Ishihara Kaori 1st LIVE TOUR Face to FACE	Released: 17 June 2020; Label: Pony Canyon; Catalog No.: PCXP-50775 (BD edition), PCBP-54270 (DVD edition); Format: BD, DVD	11(BD) 16(DVD)
Ishihara Kaori 2nd LIVE MAKE SMILE	Released: 7 July 2021; Label: Pony Canyon; Catalog No.: PCXP-50837 (BD edition), PCBP-54446 (DVD edition); Format: BD, DVD	
Ishihara Kaori LIVE 2022 Starcast	Released: 19 October 2022; Label: Pony Canyon; Catalog No.: PCXP-50905 (BD edition), PCBP-54462 (DVD edition); Format: BD, DVD	13(BD) 20(DVD)
Ishihara Kaori 5th Anniversary Live -bouquet-	Released: 13 December 2023; Label: Pony Canyon; Catalog No.: PCXP-51024 (Special edition), PCXP-51025; Format: BD	17
Ishihara Kaori 2nd LIVE TOUR -Calm Magic-	Released: 20 November 2024; Label: Pony Canyon; Catalog No.: PCXP-51097 (Special edition), PCXP-51098; Format: BD	15
Ishihara Kaori LIVE 2025 -As I Am- Blu-ray-	Released: 21 January 2026; Label: Pony Canyon; Catalog No.: SCXP-00202 (Special edition), PCXP-51248; Format: BD	19

== Concerts ==
=== Personal concerts ===
Date	Title	Venue	Source
29 December 2018	Ishihara Kaori 1st LIVE Sunny Spot Story	Sonic City Hall	
13 and 18 January 2020 24 February 2020	Ishihara Kaori 1st TOUR Face to Face	NHK Osaka Hall; Civil Hall; Nakano Sun Plaza	

=== Other concerts ===
Year	Title	Venue	Source
2018	AJ Night 2018	Toyosu PIT	
2018	LisAni! PARK Vol.02	Shinkiba Studio Coast	
2018	ANIMAX MUSIX 2018 YOKOHAMA	Yokohama Arena	
2019	Animelo Summer Live 2019	Saitama Super Arena	
2019	ANIMAX MUSIX 2019 KOBE	World Memorial Hall	
