= Yui Ogura =

Japanese actress and singer

- 小倉 唯
- Born: August 15, 1995 (age 31); Kasakake, Gunma Prefecture, Japan
- Education: Showa Women's University
- Occupations: Voice actress; Singer
- Years active: 2003–present
- Agent: Style Cube
- Notable work: Goblin Slayer as Priestess; The "Hentai" Prince and the Stony Cat. as Tsukiko Tsutsukakushi; Hugtto! PreCure as Homare Kagayaki / Cure Etoile; Yuuna and the Haunted Hot Springs as Yaya Fushiguro; Heaven's Memo Pad as Alice; Encouragement of Climb as Kokona Aoba; Teasing Master Takagi-san as Sanae Tsukimoto; Black Clover as Vanica Zogratis; Hatsune Miku: Colorful Stage! as Minori Hanasato; Blue Archive as Shiroko Sunaookami; Umamusume: Pretty Derby as Manhattan Cafe
- Height: 150 cm (4 ft 11 in)
- Musical career
- Genres: J-pop; Anison
- Instruments: Vocals
- Labels: King Amusement Creative (2012–2022); Nippon Columbia (2022–present)
- Formerly of: StylipS
- Website: ogurayui-official.com

Signature
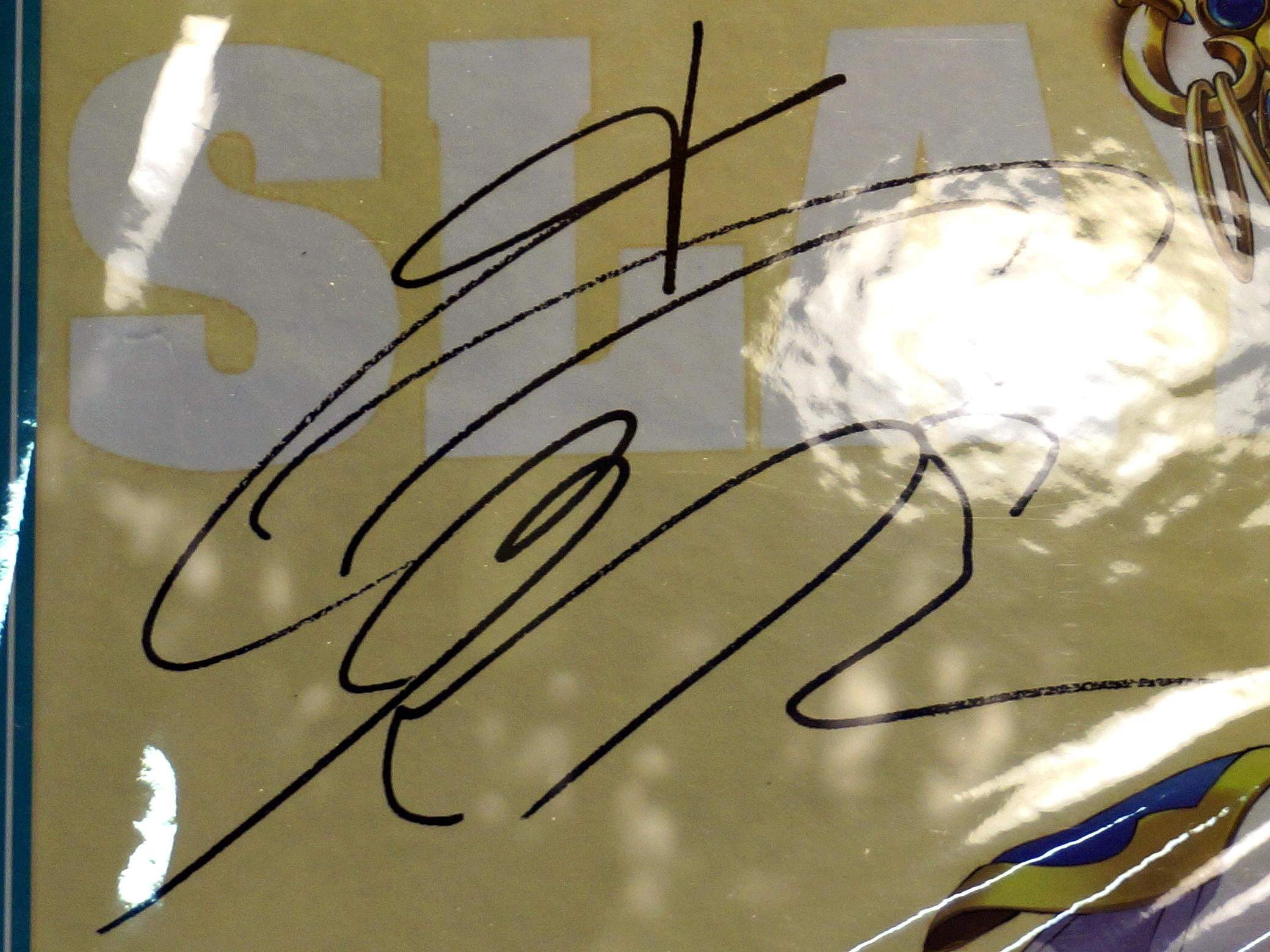

Yui Ogura (小倉 唯, Ogura Yui; born August 15, 1995) is a Japanese voice actress and singer from Gunma Prefecture. She is best known for her roles as Homare Kagayaki / Cure Etoile in Hugtto! PreCure, Sunaookami Shiroko in Blue Archive, Manhattan Cafe in Umamusume: Pretty Derby, Hanasato Minori in Hatsune Miku: Colorful Stage!, and Hanitan in Waccha PriMagi!.

== Career ==
Ogura has portrayed anime characters such as Hinata Hakamada in Ro-Kyu-Bu!, Yunoha Thru in Aquarion Evol, Kokona Aoba in Encouragement of Climb and Tsukiko Tsutsukakushi in The "Hentai" Prince and the Stony Cat and so on. In 2009, she performed the motion capture for Hatsune Miku in the game Hatsune Miku: Project DIVA.

Ogura is a member of the Japanese idol duo YuiKaori with Kaori Ishihara and she was also a part of the idol unit StylipS (also with Ishihara, along with Arisa Noto and Maho Matsunaga), as well as pop group Happy Style Rookies. On June 30, 2017, YuiKaori suspended its musical activities to allow Ogura and Ishihara to focus on their individual careers. However, it was announced that their reunion event will be held on May 9, 2027.

In addition to her voice acting career, Ogura made her solo debut as a singer under King Records on July 18, 2012, with the single "Raise", which was used as the ending theme for the anime Campione!. She has also contributed lyrics and choreography to several of her songs.

Ogura graduated Showa Women's University with a bachelor's degree in Psychology in March 2018.

On April 1, 2022, Ogura transferred to Style Cube and on August 15, Ogura announced that she switched to Nippon Columbia as her record label.

== Filmography ==
=== Anime ===
List of voice performances in anime
| Year | Title | Role | Notes | Source |
|---|---|---|---|---|
| 2009–10 | Yumeiro Patissiere | Ringo Koizumi, Mint | Also SP Professional | |
| 2010 | Kaitō Reinya | Inspector's daughter | Episodes 10-11 | |
| 2010 | Maid Sama! | Various characters | | |
| 2010–13 | Oreimo | Tamaki Goko | 2 season | |
| 2011 | Sket Dance | Suzu Chūma | Episodes 45, 58, 68, 77 | |
| 2011–13 | Ro-Kyu-Bu! series | Hinata Hakamada | Also SS and OVAs in 2013 | |
| 2011 | Heaven's Memo Pad | Alice | | |
| 2011 | Mayo Chiki! | Choco | | |
| 2011 | C³ | Kuroe Ningyohara | | |
| 2012–15 | High School D×D series | Katase | | |
| 2012 | Aquarion Evol | Yunoha Suroor | Also Love OVA in 2015 as Yuno Kawazu | |
| 2012 | Saki Achiga-hen Episode of Side-A | Toki Onjōji | | |
| 2012 | Tsuritama | Sakura Usami | | |
| 2012 | Hyouka | Kayo Zenna | | |
| 2012 | Nakaimo - My Sister is Among Them! | Yuzurina Houshou | | |
| 2012 | Campione! | Athena | Solo singing debut with ending theme song. Episodes 1–4, 8-13 | |
| 2012 | The Ambition of Oda Nobuna | Takenaka Hanbee | | |
| 2012–13 | The Pet Girl of Sakurasou | Yūko Kanda | | |
| 2013–22 | Encouragement of Climb series | Kokona Aoba | 4 seasons | |
| 2013 | The "Hentai" Prince and the Stony Cat. | Tsukiko Tsutsukakushi | | |
| 2013 | Hyperdimension Neptunia: The Animation | Rom | | |
| 2013 | Yozakura Quartet ~Hana no Uta~ | Kohime Sakurano | Episodes 4, 7-9 | |
| 2013 | Unbreakable Machine-Doll | Komurasaki | | |
| 2014 | Recently, My Sister Is Unusual | Hiyori Kotobuki | | |
| 2014 | Z/X Ignition | Azumi Kagamihara | | |
| 2014 | Inu Neko Hour: 47 Todoufuken R | Gunma Dog | | |
| 2014 | Black Bullet | Midori Fuse | | |
| 2014–15 | Cross Ange | Chris | Episodes 1–8, 10–13, 17-25 | |
| 2014 | Girl Friend Beta | Momoko Asahina | | |
| 2015 | Yurikuma Arashi | Sumika Izumino | | |
| 2015 | Dog Days | Aria | | |
| 2015 | World Break: Aria of Curse for a Holy Swordsman | Maya Shimon | | |
| 2015–17 | Teekyu series | Tomarin | Seasons 4-9 | |
| 2015 | Castle Town Dandelion | Hikari Sakurada | | |
| 2015 | Wooser's Hand-to-Mouth Life: Mugen-hen | Various characters | | |
| 2015 | Shimoneta | Binkan-chan | | |
| 2015–16 | Ultra Super Anime Time | Sumaco | Anime programming block co-host | |
| 2016 | Cardfight!! Vanguard G: Stride Gate | Remy Altena | | |
| 2016 | Twin Star Exorcists | Miku Zeze | | |
| 2016 | Regalia: The Three Sacred Stars | Tia | | |
| 2016 | Vivid Strike! | Rinne Berlinetta | | |
| 2017 | Akiba's Trip: The Animation | Pyuko | Episode 6 | |
| 2017–present | Masamune-kun's Revenge | Kinue Hayase | 2 seasons | |
| 2017 | Schoolgirl Strikers: Animation Channel | Mana Namori | | |
| 2017 | KonoSuba 2 | Axis Cultist (Classmate Impersonator) | Episodes 8-10 | |
| 2017 | Hinako Note | Mayuki Hiiragi | | |
| 2017 | Seven Mortal Sins | Beelzebub | | |
| 2017 | Hina Logi from Luck & Logic | Karin Kiritani | | |
| 2017 | Tsuredure Children | Ayaka Kamine | | |
| 2017 | My First Girlfriend Is a Gal | Nene Fujinoki | | |
| 2017 | UQ Holder! Magister Negi Magi! 2 | Karin Yuuki | | |
| 2017–18 | Hozuki's Coolheadedness 2 | Zashikiwarashi Niko | | |
| 2018 | Pop Team Epic | Sosogu Hoshifuri | | |
| 2018 | Basilisk: The Ōka Ninja Scrolls | Senhime | | |
| 2018–22 | Teasing Master Takagi-san | Sanae Tsukimoto | 3 seasons | |
| 2018 | The Ryuo's Work Is Never Done! | Charlotte Izoard | | |
| 2018–19 | Hugtto! PreCure | Homare Kagayaki / Cure Étoile | | |
| 2018 | You Don't Know Gunma Yet | Teruna "Ietty" Ieki | | |
| 2018 | Crossing Time | Tomo | | |
| 2018 | Ongaku Shōjo | Haori Mukae, Uori Mukae | | |
| 2018 | Yuuna and the Haunted Hot Springs | Yaya Fushiguro | | |
| 2018 | Boarding School Juliet | Teria Wan | | |
| 2018–present | Goblin Slayer | Priestess | | |
| 2018 | My Sister, My Writer | Mai Himuro | | |
| 2019 | Pastel Memories | Chimari Maiko | | |
| 2019 | Arifureta: From Commonplace to World's Strongest | Myu | | |
| 2019 | African Office Worker | Gorimi | | |
| 2019 | Z/X Code reunion | Azumi Kagamihara | | |
| 2020–22 | Magia Record: Puella Magi Madoka Magica Side Story | Sana Futaba | | |
| 2020 | Infinite Dendrogram | Cyco | | |
| 2020–22 | Science Fell in Love, So I Tried to Prove It | Arika Yamamoto | | |
| 2020 | A Destructive God Sits Next to Me | Chikako | | |
| 2020–21 | Shadowverse | Alice Kurobane | | |
| 2020 | Dogeza: I Tried Asking While Kowtowing | Minori Gakesaka, Yua Aneha, Ayame Omoi | | |
| 2021 | Black Clover | Vanica Zogratis | | |
| 2021 | So I'm a Spider, So What? | Sue | | |
| 2021 | My Next Life as a Villainess: All Routes Lead to Doom! X | Selena Burke | | |
| 2021 | The Great Jahy Will Not Be Defeated! | Kokoro | | |
| 2021 | Gunma-chan | Mimi | | |
| 2021–22 | Waccha PriMagi! | Hanitan | | |
| 2021–22 | Platinum End | Nasse | | |
| 2022 | Pokémon Ultimate Journeys: The Series | Marnie | | |
| 2022 | The Greatest Demon Lord Is Reborn as a Typical Nobody | Verda El Hazard | | |
| 2022 | Miss Shachiku and the Little Baby Ghost | Miko-chan | | |
| 2022 | Rent-A-Girlfriend | Shiori | | |
| 2022 | The Human Crazy University | Chie Negishi | | |
| 2022 | More Than a Married Couple, But Not Lovers | Mei Hamano | | |
| 2022 | Kantai Collection: Let's Meet at Sea | Ryuuhou | | |
| 2023 | The Reincarnation of the Strongest Exorcist in Another World | Yuki | | |
| 2023 | Yuri Is My Job! | Hime Shirasagi | | |
| 2023 | Summoned to Another World for a Second Time | Shironeko | | |
| 2023 | The Diary of Ochibi-san | Akame-chan | | |
| 2023 | Bikkuri-Men | Cross | | |
| 2024 | The Strongest Tank's Labyrinth Raids | Manicia | | |
| 2024 | Metallic Rouge | Jill Sturgeon | | |
| 2024 | Astro Note | Aoi Uemachi | | |
| 2024 | Blue Archive the Animation | Shiroko Sunaookami | | |
| 2024 | Studio Apartment, Good Lighting, Angel Included | Lilishka | | |
| 2024 | Goodbye, Dragon Life | Raphrasia | | |
| 2025 | I've Been Killing Slimes for 300 Years and Maxed Out My Level 2 | Sandora | | |
| 2025 | A Ninja and an Assassin Under One Roof | Aoko Yoshida | | |
| 2025 | Hero Without a Class: Who Even Needs Skills?! | Colette | | |
| 2026 | Mistress Kanan Is Devilishly Easy | Yuriko Yurino | | |
| 2026 | I Want to End This Love Game | Hinako Hanaba | | |
| 2026 | A Livid Lady's Guide to Getting Even | Lunoa Carlton | | |
| 2027 | The Greatest Magicmaster's Retirement Plan | Loki Leevahl | | |
| 2027 | The One. Later On... | Mear | | |

=== OVA/ONA ===
| Year | Title | Role | Source |
|---|---|---|---|
| 2011 | .hack//Quantum | Hermit | |
| 2013 | Nakaimo - My Sister is Among Them! | Perin-chan | |
| 2015–17 | Hozuki's Coolheadedness | Zashikiwarashi Niko | |
| 2017 | Encouragement of Climb: Omoide no Present | Kokona Aoba | |
| 2018 | Calamity of a Zombie Girl | Alma V | |
| 2018 | Masamune-kun's Revenge | Kinue Hayase, Haruka | |
| 2019 | Armor Shop for Ladies & Gentlemen | Emina | |
| 2020 | Mokuri | Mokuri | |
| 2023 | Pole Princess!! | Mio Tousaka | |
| 2023 | Cute Executive Officer R | Ray Okano | |
| 2024 | Babies of Bread | Cream Bun Baby 2 | |

=== Animated films ===
| Year | Title | Role | Source |
|---|---|---|---|
| 2016 | KanColle: The Movie | Amatsukaze | |
| 2018 | Precure Super Stars! | Homare Kagayaki / Cure Étoile | |
| 2018 | K: Seven Stories - Lost Small World: Ori no Mukou | Aya Oogai | |
| 2018 | Kaijuu Girls (Black) | Gatanothor | |
| 2019 | Pandora to Akubi | Pandora | |
| 2020 | Goblin Slayer: Goblin's Crown | Priestess | |
| 2020 | Over the Sky | Madoka | |
| 2022 | Teasing Master Takagi-san: The Movie | Sanae Tsukimoto | |
| 2024 | Umamusume: Pretty Derby – Beginning of a New Era | Manhattan Cafe | |
| 2025 | Colorful Stage! The Movie: A Miku Who Can't Sing | Minori Hanasato | |

=== Video games ===
List of voice performances in video games
| Year | Title | Role | Notes | Source |
|---|---|---|---|---|
| 2009 | Cleaning Squadron Kura Kappa H | Kaki かきぃ | PS1 / PS2 | |
| 2011 | Ore no Imōto ga Konna ni Kawaii Wake ga Nai Portable | Kuroneko's younger sister | PSP | |
| 2011–present | Hyperdimension Neptunia games | Rom | Starting with Mk2 | |
| 2011 | Yuu President Brave Company | Collette Kabaner コレット・カバネル | iOS,3DS | |
| 2011–14 | Ro-Kyu-Bu! games | Hinata Hakamada | | |
| 2012 | If you are in a locked room with a girl you might do. ja:女の子と密室にいたら○○しちゃうかもしれない。 | Togo Togo 東郷こころ | 3DS | |
| 2012 | Mugen Souls | Sharuru Cocott | PS3 | |
| 2012 | This department occupied the part not going home. Potabu Gakuen series | Yayoi Hiiragi | PSP | |
| 2012 | Tokyo Babel | God | PC (general) | |
| 2012 | Ys: Memories of Celceta | Calilica | PS Vita, PS4, PC | |
| 2013 | Sorcery Saga: Curse of the Great Curry God | Pupuru | PSVita | |
| 2013 | Fate/Extra CCC | Passionlip | PSP | |
| 2013 | Summon Night 5 | Exela | PSP | |
| 2013 | A piece of a wish and a contractor of silver | Patience | PC (general) | |
| 2013 | Saki - Achiga Hen episode of side - A Portable | Toki Onjōji | PSP | |
| 2013 | Girls x Magic | Nonomiya Yusuke | Other | |
| 2013 | Tears to Tiara II: Heir of the Overlord | Caris | PS3 | |
| 2013 | The "Hentai" Prince and the Stony Cat. | Tsukiko Tsutsukakushi | PSP | |
| 2014 | Schoolgirl Strikers | Mana Namori | Mobile | |
| 2014 | Hamatora: Look at Smoking World | roll ロール | DS | |
| 2014 | Dungeon Travelers 2 | Liserietta Marsh リゼリエッタ・マーシュ | PSP, PSVita | |
| 2014 | Lord of Magna: Maiden Heaven | Gabriele | DS | |
| 2014 | Chaos Rings III | Elroux | PSVita, Mobile | |
| 2014 | Dengeki Bunko Fighting Climax | Hinata Hakamada | Arcade, PS3, PSVita, PS4; Also Ignition in 2015 | |
| 2015 | Princess Connect! | Hikawa Kyouka | PC, Mobile | |
| 2015 | Xenoblade Chronicles X | Cross (Soft-spoken) | Wii U | |
| 2015 | Cross Ange | Chris クリス | PSVita | |
| 2015 | Mystery Chronicle: One Way Heroics | Fallen Angel Alma | PS4, PSVita, PC | |
| 2015 | Saki the Nationals | Toki Onjōji | PSVita | |
| 2015 | Monster Strike | Pandora | Mobile | |
| 2015–16 | Girl Friend Beta games | Momoko Asahina | Mobile, PSVita | |
| 2016 | Summon Night 6 | Am | PS4, PSVita | |
| 2016 | Star Ocean: Integrity and Faithlessness | Lilia リリア | PS3, PS4 | |
| 2016 | Zonmi-chan: Meat Pie of the Dead | Zonmi-chan | Other | |
| 2016 | Shadowverse | Luna | PC, Mobile | |
| 2016 | Granblue Fantasy | Harie, Luna | Mobile | |
| 2017 | Fate/Grand Order | Passionlip, Nezha | Mobile | |
| 2017 | Digimon Story: Cyber Sleuth – Hacker's Memory | Erika Mishima, Sistermon Blanc | PS4, PS Vita | |
| 2017 | Magia Record: Puella Magi Madoka Magica Side Story | Sana Futaba | Mobile | |
| 2018 | Azur Lane | IJN Yūbari, I-19 | Mobile | |
| 2018 | Ar:pieL | Irene | PC | |
| 2018 | Princess Connect! Re:Dive | Hikawa Kyouka, Luna | Mobile | |
| 2020 | Arknights | Rosmontis | Mobile | |
| 2020 | Hatsune Miku: Colorful Stage! | Minori Hanasato | Mobile | |
| 2020 | Girls' Frontline | M200, Desert Eagle | Mobile | |
| 2021 | Monster Hunter Rise | Rondine | | |
| 2021 | Blue Archive | Shiroko Sunaookami | PC, Mobile | |
| 2021 | Umamusume: Pretty Derby | Manhattan Cafe | Mobile | |
| 2021 | DC Super Heroes Girls: Teen Power | Lena Luthor | Nintendo Switch | |
| 2021 | Alchemy Stars | Alice, Requiem, Pepita | Mobile | |
| 2021 | Ys Online: The Ark of Napishtim | Isha | Mobile | |
| 2021 | The Legend of Heroes: Trails Through Daybreak | Feri Al-Fayed | PS4 | |
| 2022 | Monster Hunter Rise Sunbreak | Rondine | | |
| 2022 | The Legend of Heroes: Trails Through Daybreak II | Feri Al-Fayed | PS4, PS5 | |
| 2022 | Tower of Fantasy | Ruby | PC, Mobile | |
| 2022 | Goddess of Victory: Nikke | Shifty, Noah | PC, Mobile | |
| 2022 | Girls' Frontline: Project Neural Cloud | Croque | Mobile | |
| 2023 | A Certain Magical Index: Imaginary Fest | Fremea Seivelun | Mobile | |
| 2023 | Summer Time Rendering: Another Horizon | Kaori Koyuba | PS4, Nintendo Switch | |
| 2023 | 404 Game Re:set | Mappy | | |
| 2023 | Honkai: Star Rail | March 7th, Evernight | | |
| 2024 | Goblin Slayer Another Adventurer: Nightmare Feast | Priestess | | |
| 2025 | The Hundred Line: Last Defense Academy | Kurara Oosuzuki | Nintendo Switch, PC | |
| 2025 | Shine Post: Be Your Idol! | Kyoka Tamaki | Nintendo Switch 2 | |
| 2026 | Neverness to Everness | Linko | PS5, PC, Mobile | |
| 2026 | Stella Sora | Karin | PC, Mobile | |

=== Drama CDs ===
List of voice performances in drama CDs and audio recordings
| Year | Title | Role | Notes | Source |
|---|---|---|---|---|
| 2012 | There is one younger sister in this! Drama CD There are some memories this summer! | Houzousuzumina 宝生柚璃奈 | | |
| 2012 | Sound drama 101st hundred stories | Matsue Ichinoe | | |
| 2012 | Ro-Kyu-Bu! | Hinata Hakamada | | |
| 2016 | Goblin Slayer | Priestess | | |
| 2018 | Sacrificial Princess and the King of Beasts | | | |

== Discography ==
=== Singles ===
| No. | Release date | Title | Details | Peak Oricon chart positions | Album |
King Records
| 1 | July 18, 2012 | "Raise" | Catalog No.: KICM-91397, 1397; Format: CD | 8 | Strawberry Jam |
| 2 | May 8, 2013 | "Baby Sweet Berry Love" | Catalog No.: KICM-91442, 1442; Format: CD | 6 | Strawberry Jam |
| 3 | January 29, 2014 | "Charming Do!" | Catalog No.: KICM-91493, 1493; Format: CD; Ending track of "Recently, My Sister Is Unusual" anime series | 13 | Strawberry Jam |
| 4 | August 13, 2014 | "Tinkling Smile" | Catalog No.: KICM-91526, 1526; Format: CD | 12 | Strawberry Jam |
| 5 | August 12, 2015 | "Honey♥Come!!" | Catalog No.: KICM-91607, 1608; Format: CD | 13 | Cherry Passport |
| 6 | May 18, 2016 | "High Touch Memory" (ハイタッチ☆メモリー) | Catalog No.: KICM-91667, 1668; Format: CD | 9 | Cherry Passport |
| 7 | November 2, 2016 | "Future Strike" | Catalog No.: KICM-91724, 1725; Format: CD | 10 | Cherry Passport |
| 8 | March 14, 2018 | "Shiroku Saku Hana" (白く咲く花) | Catalog No.: KICM-91834, 1834; Format: CD | 13 | Hop Step Apple |
| 9 | July 25, 2018 | "Eien Shonen" (永遠少年) | Catalog No.: KICM-91856, 1857; Format: CD | 13 | Hop Step Apple |
| 10 | October 30, 2019 | "Destiny" | Catalog No.: KICM-91987, 1988; Format: CD | 7 | Tarte |
| 11 | February 12, 2020 | "I・LOVE・YOU!!" | Catalog No.: KICM-92030, 2030; Format: CD | 11 | Tarte |
| 12 | June 10, 2020 | "Happiness Sensation" (ハピネス*センセーション) | Catalog No.: KICM-92048, 2049; Format: CD | 7 | Tarte |
| 13 | March 31, 2021 | "Clear Morning" | Catalog No.: KICM-92078, 2078; Format: CD | 8 | Tarte |
| 14 | August 11, 2021 | "Fightin★Pose" | Catalog No.: KICM-92096, 2096; Format: CD; Opening track of "The Great Jahy Will Not Be Defeated!" anime series | 4 | Tarte |
Nippon Columbia
| 1 | December 21, 2022 | "Love∞Vision" | Catalog No.: COZC-1966/7,18055,18056; Format: CD, CD+DVD | | |
| 2 | April 19, 2023 | "Himitsu♡Melody" (秘密♡Melody) | Catalog No.: COZC-1994/5,18109,18110,18111; Format: CD, CD+DVD; Opening track of Yuri Is My Job! anime series | | |
| 3 | November 22, 2023 | "Empty//Princess." | Catalog No.: COZC-2057/8,18156,18157; Format: CD, CD+DVD | | |
| 4 | April 24, 2024 | "Kimiiro no Kiseki" (君色のキセキ) | Catalog No.: COZC-2087/8,18201,18202; Format: CD, CD+DVD; Opening track of "Studio Apartment, Good Lighting, Angel Included" anime series | | |
| 5 | April 23, 2025 | "So☆Lucky" | | | |
| 6 | February 11, 2026 | "Chocolate Memorial" (チョコレート・メモリアル) | | 6 | |

=== Albums ===
| No. | Release date | Title | Album details | Peak Oricon chart positions |
|---|---|---|---|---|
| 1 | March 25, 2015 | Strawberry Jam | Label: King Records; Catalog No.: KICS-3174, KIZC-276/7, KIZC-278/9; Format: CD, CD+DVD, CD+BD | 4 |
| 2 | July 26, 2017 | Cherry Passport | Label: King Records; Catalog No.: KICS-3496, KIZC-386/7, KIZC-388/9; Format: CD, CD+DVD, CD+BD | 5 |
| 3 | February 20, 2019 | Hop Step Apple (ホップ・ステップ・アップル) | Label: King Records; Catalog No.: KICS-3772, KIZC-504/5, KIZC-506/7; Format: CD, CD+DVD, CD+BD | 5 |
| 4 | February 16, 2022 | Tarte | Label: King Records; Catalog No.: KICS-4040, KIZC-660/1, KIZC-657-9; Format: CD, CD+DVD, CD+BD | 7 |
| 5 | September 18, 2024 | Bloomy | Label: Nippon Columbia; Format: CD | 11 |
| 6 | November 25, 2025 | Labo-ratory | | |

=== Live videos ===
| No. | Release date | Title | Album details | Peak Oricon chart positions |
|---|---|---|---|---|
| 1 | December 23, 2015 | Yui Ogura LIVE "HAPPY JAM" | Label: King Records; Catalog No.: KIXM-219, KIBM-535/6; Format: Blu-ray, DVD | 26 (BD); 70 (DVD) |
| 2 | February 8, 2017 | Yui Ogura LIVE "High-Touch☆Summer" | Label: King Records; Catalog No.: KIXM-264, KIBM-626/7; Format: Blu-ray, DVD | 4 (BD); 28 (DVD) |
| 3 | September 12, 2018 | Yui Ogura LIVE "Cherry×Airline" | Label: King Records; Catalog No.: KIXM-333/4, KIBM-736/7; Format: Blu-ray, DVD | 6 (BD); 24 (DVD) |
| 4 | August 7, 2019 | Yui Ogura LIVE 2019 "Step Apple" | Label: King Records; Catalog No.: KIXM-383, KIBM-795/6; Format: Blu-ray, DVD | 7 (BD); 27 (DVD) |
| 5 | December 8, 2021 | Yui Ogura LIVE 2020-2021 "LOVE ＆”Magic" | Label: King Records; Catalog No.: KIXM-471/2, KIBM-888/9; Format: Blu-ray, DVD | |
| 6 | December 13, 2023 | Yui Ogura Memorial LIVE 2023 "10th Anniversary Assemble!!" | Label: Nippon Columbia; Catalog No.: COXC1345; Format: Blu-ray | |
| 7 | July 10, 2024 | Yui Ogura Memorial LIVE 2023 "~To the 11'Eleven~" | Label: Nippon Columbia; Catalog No.: COXC1363; Format: Blu-ray | |
