= YuiKaori =

Japanese musical duo

YuiKaori ゆいかおり
- Origin: Japan
- Genres: J-pop; anison; game music
- Years active: 2008–2017, 2025-
- Label: King / MM
- Past members: Yui Ogura; Kaori Ishihara
- Website: www.yuikaori.info

YuiKaori (ゆいかおり) is a Japanese female voice actress and singing duo consisting of Yui Ogura and Kaori Ishihara. The name of the unit is a combination of their given names.

YuiKaori was formed in 2008 and made their indie CD debut in the next year. In 2010, they made their major label debut under King Records with the single “Our Steady Boy,” which was also used as the ending theme for the anime kiss×sis. Throughout the 2010s, YuiKaori released numerous singles and albums, many of which were tied to anime series. They also successfully held solo concert tours, including performances at the prestigious Nippon Budokan—an impressive feat for a voice actress unit.

On March 31, 2017, YuiKaori announced a hiatus from group activities via their official website. The reason given was to allow each member to focus on her individual career. However, YuiKaori announced that they will resume activities on May 12, 2025, which marks the 15th anniversary of their major debut.

== Discography ==
=== Albums ===
==== Studio albums ====
| Year | Album details | Catalog No. | Peak Oricon chart positions |
|---|---|---|---|
| 2011 | Puppy: Released: September 21, 2011; Label: King Records; Format: CD | KICS-91722 (Regular Edition), KICS-1722 (Limited Edition) | 40 |
| 2013 | Bunny: Released: October 23, 2013; Label: King Records; Format: (CD, CD+DVD, CD+BD) | KICS-1981 (Regular Edition); KIZC-221/22 (CD+DVD); KIZC-219/20 (CD+BD) | 15/36 |
| 2015 | Bright Canary: Released: November 4, 2015; Label: King Records; Format: (CD, CD+DVD, CD+BD) | KICS-3299 (Regular Edition); KIZC-341/42 (CD+DVD); KIZC-339/40 (CD+BD) | 7 |

==== Compilation albums ====
| Title | Album details | Catalog No. | Peak Oricon chart positions |
|---|---|---|---|
| Y & K | Released: June 21, 2017; Label: King Records; Format: (2CD, 2CD+DVD, 2CD+BD) | KICS-3502～3 (Regular Edition) KIZC-395～7 (2CD+BD) KIZC-398～400 (2CD+DVD) | 10 |

=== Singles ===
| Year | Song | Catalog No. | Peak Oricon chart positions | Album |
|---|---|---|---|---|
| 2010 | "Our Steady Boy" (Kissxsis 1st ending theme) | KIZM-49/50 | 64 | Puppy |
| 2010 | "Futari / VIVIVID PARTY! (ふたり/VIVIVID PARTY!)" | KIZM-61/62 | 91 | Puppy |
| 2010 | "HEARTBEAT ga Tomaranai! (HEARTBEATが止まらないっ!)" | KICM-91322 (Regular Edition), KICM-1322 (Limited Edition) | 83 | Puppy |
| 2011 | "Shooting☆Smile" (Game Toy Wars opening theme) | KICM-91334 (Regular Edition), KICM-1334 (Limited Edition) | 57 | Puppy |
| 2012 | "Kimi no YELL (君のYELL)" (Game Attouteki Yuugi Mugen Souls opening theme) | KICM-91385 (Regular Edition), KICM-1385 (Limited Edition) | 27 | Bunny |
| 2012 | "Wake Up!! (ウェィカッ!!)" | KICM-91417 (Regular Edition), KICM-1417 (Limited Edition) | 19 | Bunny |
| 2013 | "Shiny Blue" (Game Sei Madou Monogatari opening theme) | KICM-91438 (Regular Edition), KICM-1438 (Limited Edition) | 16 | Bunny |
| 2014 | "LUCKY DUCKY!!" | KICM-1512 (Regular Edition), KICM-91512 (Limited Edition) | 8 | Bright Canary |
| 2014 | "Intro Situation" | KICM-1523 (Regular Edition), KICM-91523 (Limited Edition) | 7 | Bright Canary |
| 2015 | "NEO SIGNALIFE" | KICM-1564 (Regular Edition), KICM-91564 (Limited Edition) | 13 | Bright Canary |
| 2015 | "Ring Ring Rainbow" (Anime "Jōkamachi no Dandelion" opening theme) | KICM-1606 (Regular Edition), KICM-91605 (Limited Edition) | 19 | Bright Canary |
| 2016 | "Promise You!!" | KICM-1698 (Regular Edition), KICM-91697 (Limited Edition) | 13 | Y & K |
