= Puppy (YuiKaori album) =

Studio album by YuiKaori
- Released: 21 September 2011
- Recorded: 2009–2011
- Genre: J-Pop
- Length: 49:10
- Label: King Records

YuiKaori chronology
Puppy (2011)	Bunny (2013)

Singles from Supernova
- 1. "Koi no Overtake" Released: September 26, 2009; 2. "Our Steady Boy" Released: May 12, 2010; 3. "Futari/Vivivid Party!" Released: July 7, 2010; 4. "Heartbeat ga Tomaranai!" Released: November 17, 2010; 5. "Shooting Smile" Released: April 6, 2011

Puppy is the debut album of J-Pop idol duo, YuiKaori. It was released on 21 September 2011.

It is composed with songs from games, anime, and insert songs, but it is also contains original songs. Many songs have been released as singles.

== Song information ==
- "Our Steady Boy" was used as the 1st ending theme to the 2010 anime television series Kissxsis.
- "Futari/Vivivid Party!" was released as a double-single, while "Futari" used as the second ending theme to the 2010 anime television series Kissxsis.
- "Shooting Smile" was used as the opening theme to the 2011 Game Toy Wars.

== Track listing ==
No.	Title	Lyrics	Music	Length
1.	"Koi no Overtake (恋のオーバーテイク)"	Ryū Toshi	Sizuk	4:10
2.	"Puppy Love!!"	Kenichi Maeyamada		4:10
3.	"Mirai Kei Idol (未来形アイドル)"	Tsukasa Nagoya	Kohei	4:10
4.	"Vivivid Party!"	Fumie Akiyoshi	Makoto Miyazaki	4:10
5.	"Kyu! Kyu! Curiosity!! (キュッ!キュッ!CURIOSITY!!)"	Kenichi Yamada		4:02
6.	"Magic starter"	Natsumi Tadano	Ryū Toshi, Gravity musik	4:01
7.	"Futari (ふたり)"	Shoko Omori	Nana Takahashi	4:02
8.	"Kake Nukete Blue (駆け抜けてBlue)"	Saori Kodama	Gravity musik	4:02
9.	"Heartbeat ga Tomaranaii! (HEARTBEATが止まらないっ!)"	Kenichi Maeyamada	Sizuk	4:00
10.	"Shooting Smile"	Kenichi Maeyamada	Sizuk	3:49
11.	"Crystal no Chikai (クリスタルの誓い)"	Kenichi Maeyamada	Makoto Miyazaki	4:03
12.	"Our Steady Boy"	Shoko Omori	Mizuki Ueki	3:59
Total length:				49:10

== Charts ==
Chart	Peak position
Oricon Weekly Albums	40
