= The "Hentai" Prince and the Stony Cat =

Japanese light novel series

- Cover of the first light novel featuring one of the main heroines, Tsukiko Tsutsukakushi

変態王子と笑わない猫。 (Hentai Ōji to Warawanai Neko)
- Genre: Harem, romantic comedy, supernatural
- Light novel
- Written by: Sou Sagara
- Illustrated by: Kantoku
- Published by: Media Factory
- Imprint: MF Bunko J
- Original run: October 25, 2010 – March 25, 2019
- Volumes: 13
- Manga
- Written by: Sou Sagara
- Illustrated by: Okomeken
- Published by: Media Factory
- English publisher: NA: Digital Manga
- Magazine: Monthly Comic Alive
- Original run: April 27, 2011 – February 27, 2018
- Volumes: 8
- Anime television series
- Directed by: Yōhei Suzuki
- Written by: Michiko Itou
- Music by: Tomoki Kikuya
- Studio: J.C.Staff
- Licensed by: AUS: Madman Entertainment; NA: Sentai Filmworks; UK: MVM Films
- Original network: Tokyo MX, TVA, MBS, BS11, RKB, TVh, Animax
- English network: SEA: Animax Asia
- Original run: April 13, 2013 – June 29, 2013
- Episodes: 12
- icon

The "Hentai" Prince and the Stony Cat (Japanese: 変態王子と笑わない猫。, Hepburn: Hentai Ōji to Warawanai Neko.; "The Pervert Prince and the Unsmiling Cat"), also known by the shorthand HenNeko (変猫。) and Towanai (とわない), is a Japanese light novel series written by Sou Sagara and illustrated by Kantoku. Media Factory published 13 volumes from October 2010 to March 2019. It was adapted into a manga series serialized in Monthly Comic Alive and a 12-episode anime television series by J.C.Staff, which aired from April to June 2013. The anime is licensed by Sentai Filmworks in North America.

== Plot ==
Yōto Yokodera is a second-year high school student who is arguably the biggest pervert at school. His problem is that he is not good at showing his real emotions. One day, his equally perverted best friend completely transforms and gets rid of his "impure thoughts"; a feat he attributes to the power of the statue of the "Stony Cat". As the rumors suggest, by wishing upon the statue and giving it an offering, one can wish to remove a personality trait from themselves that one does not wish to have anymore. However, this will remove the unwanted trait and give it to someone who does need it.

As Yōto is making his offering to the statue, a girl named Tsukiko Tsutsukakushi arrives to make her wish to be able to be more like an adult and not show her emotions so easily. Both of them wish upon the stony cat and to their surprise the next day at school, Yōto is unable to tell a single lie, and Tsukiko is unable to show any sign of emotion whatsoever. After realizing that they do not like the change that happened, they work together to try to find out who has received their trait that was taken away in order to get it back. They meet Azusa Azuki, an attractive second-year girl who has just transferred into their school. She is always being confessed to by many boys in school, but she has no friends and is always alone. Yōto finds out that Azusa is the one that received his unwanted personality trait and tries to get it back. As the two try to get back the unwanted trait, they develop feelings for each other.

== Characters ==
=== Main characters ===
Yōto Yokodera (横寺 陽人, Yokodera Yōto)
Voiced by: Yuki Kaji
Yōto is the main protagonist and a second-year in high school. He is secretly a huge pervert, yet because he is unable to say what's on his mind and so cannot truly express his inner self, his deeds are always misunderstood. He even joined the athletics club to be able to watch the girls in swimsuits. One night he heads to the Stony Cat statue to wish for it to take away his façade, since it is getting in the way of his life. However, it isn't until the Stony Cat statue grants his wish that he starts to get into trouble. The Stony Cat statue granted his wish literally, so, for a time, he lost his 'façade' (tatemae) but found that life wasn't as he had imagined it would be. He began to say everything on his mind, including all of his perverted thoughts, causing him to receive the nickname the 'Pervert Prince'. He later returns to the Stony Cat statue to recover his façade from Azusa (who had gained it). Nevertheless, over time, he becomes closer to Tsukiko, Azusa, and Tsukushi.
It is revealed that several years previously he gave up his memories of his time with Tsukasa to the Tsutsukakushi sisters so that they would have memories of their mother. He develops feelings for Tsukiko.
Tsukiko Tsutsukakushi (筒隠 月子, Tsutsukakushi Tsukiko)
Voiced by: Yui Ogura
Tsukiko is a first-year student at Yōto's high school. She shows her emotions easily and goes to the Stony Cat statue where she wishes to become more mature and less open with her emotions. The Stony Cat statue takes her words literally, and as a result, she has become unable to express any emotions on her face, regardless of the situation.
Despite Yōto's occasional perverted actions, she develops feelings for him and hopes for an advantage over the other girls who pursue him. After knowing that Yōto can't have long term memory, she prepared a diary and claimed to remember everything for him.
Azusa Azuki (小豆 梓, Azuki Azusa)
Voiced by: Kaori Ishihara
Azusa is a second-year high school student and a very popular girl, despite being flat-chested. She is a loner and has rejected all of the confessions she has received. She likes animals and tends to include bizarre animal similes in conversation. As a result of Yōto's wish on the Stony Cat statue, she temporarily becomes unable to express her honest feelings. While she pretends to be a rich elite, she actually lives in a small apartment and keeps several jobs in a neighboring town in order to be able to afford the act. Before she transferred, she was outcast and bullied in her old school; this ultimately led to her losing trust in people. After Yōto regains his façade, she begins to open up to those around her including Yōto for whom she starts to develop feelings. At his urging she reconciles with Morii and Moriya, her former friends from her old school to help her in her desperateness.
Tsukushi Tsutsukakushi (筒隠 つくし, Tsutsukakushi Tsukushi)
Voiced by: Yukari Tamura
Tsukushi is Tsukiko's older sister and the president of the track and field club, where she is referred to as the "Steel King" (鋼鉄の王, Kōtetsu no Ō). In the beginning of the story, she admires Yōto for his eagerness to join the club, and even believes him to act as a pervert because he is under too much pressure. She is deeply in love with her little sister Tsukiko, to the point that she wants to marry her. She confronts Yōto about his relationship with her sister and believes his lie that the person associating with Tsukiko is his "younger identical twin". She eventually falls in love with "Yōto's brother", still unaware of the truth, and decides that they should move to a place where polygamy is legal so that "he" can marry both her and her little sister which Yōto cannot handle.
Emi (エミ) / Emanuela Pollarola (エマヌエーラ・ポルラローラ, Emanuēra Porurarōra)
Voiced by: Aimi
Emi is a young Italian girl whom Yōto met in the past. Due to her wish on the Stony Cat statue, she temporarily acts as Ponta's sister who came back from Italy. Similarly to Azusa, Emi frequently uses strange analogies in conversation, only she uses plant similes such as calling someone a "stupid pumpkin". Her father seems to have some kind of relationship with Tsukiko's father.

=== Other characters ===
Ponta (ポン太)
Voiced by: Hirofumi Nojima
Ponta is Yōto's best childhood friend. He told Yōto about the power of the 'Stony Cat' after he himself lost his perverseness because of its power and became a selfless person who engaged in humanitarianism.
Mai Maimaki (舞牧 麻衣, Maimaki Mai)
Voiced by: Yuka Takakura
Mai is the vice president of the athletics club. She admires Tsukushi and wants to be her successor. This puts her at odds with Yōto, who is another candidate for the next club president. Her personality is cold and harsh, which isolates her from others. She is actually jealous of Yōto's ability to make friends easily and they eventually form a platonic friendship. It is hinted that she is more perverted than Yōto. She used to be friend with Azusa when they were young.
Morii (モリイ) and Moriya (モリヤ)
Voiced by: Minami Takahashi (Morii), Aya Suzaki (Moriya)
Morii and Moriya are Azusa's friends from junior-high school. They used to tease her, but were merely trying to be friendly. Azusa makes up with them after Yōto convinces them to apologize for being friendly the wrong way. They believe that Yōto and Azusa are a couple. They both often say the word "like" between words with no particular reason.
Tsukasa Tsutsukakushi (筒隠 つかさ, Tsutsukakushi Tsukasa)
Voiced by: Harumi Sakurai
Tsukasa was the mother of Tsukiko and Tsukushi, who died when they were young due to complications from an infection caused by a flood. She was a very nice person, although she sometimes sounded mean. Following her husband's death, she had her daughters move to Italy and live with her husband's parents due to her poor health. This caused a rift to form between her and Tsukushi, who believed that her mother had abandoned her and Tsukiko. While living alone, Tsukasa handmade clothes for both Tsukiko and Tsukushi, and also took care of Yōto, who would keep her company. Tsukasa was reunited with her daughters prior to her death.
Mrs. Azuki (梓の母親, Azuki no Hahaoya)
Voiced by: Aki Toyosaki
Azusa's mother, who is a very kind person and loves turtles.
The Stony Cat (笑わない猫, Warawanai Neko)
Voiced by: Yurika Kubo
The Stony Cat (also known as the Cat God) is the entity that has been worshiped by the Tsutsukakushi family for generation. It has the ability to grant and revert wishes. It also has the ability to possess people or animals, as shown when it possesses both Azusa and Ponta's rabbit. The Cat God speaks in a female voice.

== Media ==
=== Light novels ===
The "Hentai" Prince and the Stony Cat is a light novel series written by Sou Sagara, with illustrations by Kantoku. Media Factory published 13 volumes from October 25, 2010, to March 25, 2019. A drama CD was bundled with a special edition of the sixth light novel volume.

No.	Japanese release date	Japanese ISBN
1	October 25, 2010	978-4-8401-3555-9
2	January 25, 2011	978-4-8401-3800-0
3	May 25, 2011	978-4-8401-3893-2
4	September 22, 2011	978-4-8401-4207-6
5	March 23, 2012	978-4-8401-4528-2
6	March 25, 2013	978-4-8401-4686-9 (regular edition); 978-4-8401-4973-0 (special edition)
7	October 25, 2013	978-4-04-066028-8
8	April 25, 2014	978-4-04-066389-0
9	December 25, 2014	978-4-04-067316-5
10	May 25, 2015	978-4-04-067655-5
11	April 25, 2016	978-4-04-067954-9
12	March 24, 2018	978-4-04-069182-4
13	March 25, 2019	978-4-04-065624-3

=== Manga ===
A manga adaptation, illustrated by Okomeken, was serialized in Media Factory's Monthly Comic Alive magazine from the June 2011 issue to the April 2018 issue. Media Factory published the series in eight tankōbon volumes from August 23, 2011, to March 23, 2018. It was licensed in English by Digital Manga, who released the first three volumes between October 2012 and October 2014. A spin-off manga titled Hentai Ōji to Warawanai Neko. Nya! (変態王子と笑わない猫。にゃ！), illustrated by Kashi, was released in a single volume on March 23, 2013.

No.	Original release date	Original ISBN	English release date	English ISBN
1	August 23, 2011	978-4-8401-3555-9	October 31, 2012	978-1-56970-285-7
2	March 23, 2012	978-4-8401-4436-0	June 25, 2014	978-1-56970-328-1
3	October 23, 2012	978-4-8401-4736-1	October 29, 2014	978-1-56970-329-8
4	March 23, 2013	978-4-8401-5031-6	—	—
5	January 23, 2014	978-4-04-066244-2	—	—
6	March 23, 2015	978-4-04-067285-4	—	—
7	December 22, 2015	978-4-04-067859-7	—	—
8	March 23, 2018	978-4-04-069827-4	—	—

=== Anime ===
A 12-episode anime television series adaptation produced by J.C.Staff, written by Michiko Itou, and directed by Yōhei Suzuki aired between April 13 and June 29, 2013. The opening theme is "Fantastic Future" by Yukari Tamura and the ending theme is "Baby Sweet Berry Love" by Yui Ogura.

The series was simulcast by Crunchyroll. The anime is licensed by Sentai Filmworks in North America, and it was released digitally and on home video on June 3, 2014. After the acquisition of Crunchyroll by Sony Pictures Television, The "Hentai" Prince and the Stony Cat, among several Sentai Filmworks titles, was dropped from the Crunchyroll streaming service on March 31, 2022.

No.	Title	Original release date
1	"The Pervert and the Stony Cat" "Hentai-san to Warawanai Neko" (変態さんと笑わない猫)	April 13, 2013
Yōto Yokodera, a perverted schoolboy, winds up being nominated as the track and field club's president by Tsukushi Tsutsukakushi due to his inability to be honest about his perverted nature. Later that day, his friend tells him about a statue known as the 'stony cat' that allegedly granted his wish to remove his impure thoughts. Wanting to be more honest with his feelings, Yōto travels up to the hill where the stony cat lies, where he meets a girl named Tsukiko Tsutsukakushi, who also wants to wish on the stony cat so her emotions will not show easily. As they both make their wishes, a sudden flash happens, and the two of them discovers one of their belongings they had brought, a belt and a meat bun, have disappeared, but they do not think much of it. The next day, as Yōto comes across a popular transfer student Azusa Azuki, he finds himself openly stating his perverted thoughts to her, earning him the title of the "pervert prince" among his classmates. He later comes across Tsukiko, who has suddenly found herself unable to show any emotion, coming to realize this is the work of the stony cat. Realizing they need to find the people who their traits were transferred to and convince them to wish them back to their original owners, another bashful encounter leads them to deduce that Azusa now possesses Yōto's trait of holding in his true feelings. Putting this to the test, Yōto puts on a public scene of wishing to become Azusa's loyal dog, which causes Azusa, unable to go against the urge to hide her honesty, to ultimately give in.
2	"The Fairy Doesn't Get Mad" "Yōsei-san wa Okoranai" (妖精さんは怒らない)	April 20, 2013
As Yōto takes Tsukiko to an animal café to discuss their next move, they coincidentally discover that Azusa is working part-time as a maid. They intend to approach Azusa following her shift, but are forced to flee when they are reprimanded by a janitor for taking shelter from the rain near a love hotel. However, they soon find her working at yet another part-time job, later discovering she lives alone in an apartment. After Yōto confronts Azusa about this, he asks her on a date to get her away from work, with Tsukiko deciding to follow them. However, Azusa is less than happy with Yōto's choices for date venues, so Tsukiko steps in and they instead take her to an arcade game center, where Tsukiko wins Azusa a stuffed turtle. Despite managing to get along, Azusa gets a bit upset when Yōto brings up the topic of friends. Just then, the track and field president and Tsukiko's older sister, Tsukushi, shows up, forcing Yōto and Tsukiko to flee when she inquires about their 'date'. When they return to the game center, they discover Azusa being tormented by some girls from her old school, leaving her cold towards Yōto and Tsukiko, believing them to have strung her along.
3	"Speak Before Getting Sad" "Kanashimu Mae ni Koe o Dase" (哀しむ前に声を出せ)	April 27, 2013
After failing to get Azusa to talk to him, Yōto goes up to the hill, where the stony cat lies, to talk to Tsukiko about Azusa in the night on the same day. The next day, Yōto confronts her former classmates, Morii and Moyama, over what happened in the arcade game center. They had apparently teased her at her old school due to skipping it a lot, telling her their class was going on a field trip to Hokkaido when they were actually going to Okinawa, which led to her becoming distrustful of others. After hearing this, Yōto takes Azusa to the stony cat, telling her about his facade that she acquired and stating his sincere wish to become her true friend. After coming to understand his feelings, Azusa wishes on the stony cat, returning her facade to Yōto. Meanwhile, Tsukiko recalls the time when Yōto once gave her advice on how to get along with children in a dream. After showing Yōto a story presentation based on this encounter, which does not ring a bell for him, Tsukiko explains that she does not get along with Tsukushi and she believes her sister hates her.
4	"How to Defeat the Carefree King" "Kiraku na Ō no Taoshikata" (気楽な王の斃し方)	May 4, 2013
Tsukiko explains that she feels her clingy behavior drove Tsukushi away from her, which led to her making the wish on the stony cat. As Yōto tries to ask Tsukushi about this, she tells him she was the one who made the stony cat as a way of apology to Tsukiko following an argument. The next day, Tsukiko asks Yōto to help her shop for costumes for her performances with the children. Later that night, Yōto encounters Tsukushi, who states that she wants to get rid of her sisterly bonds with Tsukiko and does not believe her lack of expressions to be related to the stony cat. Afterwards, Tsukiko expresses her concerns that if she were to get her expressions back, there would be nothing connecting her to Yōto. Earnestly wanting to help Tsukiko, Yōto gets Azusa's help and calls out Tsukushi to the stony cat. There, he asks the stony cat to take away his urge to run away in exchange for his underwear. He announces that he loves Tsukiko as his little sister, leading to Tsukushi to reveal that she does love Tsukiko, albeit in a romantic way and that she wants to cut off their sisterly bonds so that they can get married in Massachusetts, a dream that is quickly shot down by Tsukiko. Tsukushi then calls out to the stony cat, who returns the meat bun containing Tsukiko's expressions, but Tsukiko decides to give it to Tsukushi instead. Some time afterwards, as the stony cat's power has apparently disappeared and Tsukiko has been rather cold towards him, Yōto is shocked to discover his house has suddenly disappeared.
5	"Goodbye, My Home" "Sayonara Mai Hōmu" (さよならマイホーム)	May 11, 2013
As Yōto asks for Tsukiko's help in determining the whereabouts of his house, Azusa becomes frustrated, having gone with Morii and Moyama to Okinawa expecting Yōto to show up as well, when he had just arranged it so they can make up. With rain settling in, Tsukiko invites Yōto to stay the night, which leads to various awkward situations when Tsukushi comes home as he comes out of the bath. While attempting to break free from a sleeping Tsukushi's grasp later that night, Yōto hears her sleep talking about her fears of Tsukiko leaving her. Meanwhile, in Okinawa, Morii suddenly collapses with a slight fever, but is helped by Azusa and Moyama. After Morii recovers, she and Azusa apologize to each other and reaffirm their friendship. Back at the Tsutsukakushi household, as Yōto hides inside the building to avoid the wrath of Tsukushi after walking in on Tsukiko naked, he discovers in their storehouse, among his house's belongings, a large stony cat statue.
6	"Welcome, My Friend" "Yōkoso Mai Furendo" (ようこそマイフレンド)	May 18, 2013
On the last night of summer vacation, Tsukiko finds Yōto sleeping in their storage room. Yōto explains that the storage room has everything found in his house and he believes the cat statue has something to do with it. The next day, Yōto asks Tsukushi about the cat statue and she tells him it is a god which their family worships. Tsukushi asks Yōto a favor to trick his "twin brother" so they can kill him, but Yōto says that Tsukiko would be sad so she must first find a way to discourage Tsukiko from liking Yōto's "twin brother". Later that night while he is in the storehouse, Azusa calls him and asks him why he did not call her and if he wants to see Azusa in her swimsuit. While talking on the phone, he says that he wishes to see Azusa in her swimsuit and she suddenly falls on top of Yōto. Later that evening after dinner, Yōto explains to Tsukiko what happened and tells her that the cat god must have been the cause. Tsukiko feels guilty and apologizes, and says that she only wished to be together with Yōto. Near bedtime while Yōto is thinking about something, Tsukushi barges in and tries to seduce Yōto in an attempt to discourage Tsukiko. In their conversation, Yōto finds out that Tsukushi only did it for Tsukiko because she was afraid that Yōto would take her away and leave her. In the heat of conversation, she wishes that the world fall into ruins, and in an instant the cat god grants her wish and the entire building comes crushing down leaving a scene of devastation.
7	"Someday, My Family" "Itsuka wa Mai Famirī" (いつかはマイファミリー)	May 25, 2013
After Yōto and Tsukushi come out from the building, the storm slowly gets stronger and Yōto suspects that Tsukushi's wish caused it. They start to move important objects to the upper level of the house in the room where Tsukushi keeps her sister's photos. Tsukiko responds by tearing down the photos. Yōto goes downstairs to carry the TV and sees Tsukiko's parents' altar and offers his prayers and thanks their daughters for their hospitality. Tsukushi comes in and comments that it is not often that people would bow before someone else's altar and thanks Yōto for praying. All of them get bored after they finish moving the important items. Tsukiko then suggests to play a card game. Later, Yōto learns that the 'storm' was wished by somebody the house and realizes the wish that Tsukushi canceled only affected the storeroom itself. Yōto confronts Tsukiko after asking Azusa to help him to make Tsukushi leave the room. After being confronted by Yōto, Tsukiko cancels her wish and the storm subsides immediately. After the incident, Yōto shows Tsukushi that his 'brother' does not exist, but Tsukushi does not believe him and confesses to "Yōto's brother". She tells him that she intends to marry both him and her sister, and kisses Yōto on the cheek. Azusa sees this and immediately runs off to the Tsutsukakushi house to make a wish onto the stony cat in the storeroom.
8	"A 100% Girl" "100% no Onna no Ko" (100%の女の子)	June 1, 2013
As they discuss their plans for their school festival, Yōto and Tsukiko stumble on a pink-haired girl named Emi. It occurs to them that Emi is Ponta's younger sister. Ponta then asks Yōto to take Emi on a tour at their school, which Yōto then agrees. Emi later discovers that Yōto is considered a huge pervert in their school and suddenly wishes upon her miniature cat statue to turn Yōto popular and their school more enjoyable. The outcome of Emi's wish turns their school's architecture into ancient Rome, and the girls wear swimsuits as uniforms while addressing Yōto as "Prince". Tsukiko later blames Yōto as the maker of the wish and prompts him to cancel it immediately. Tsukushi, on the other hand, sides with Yōto in order for her to show off her good side to Yōto's "evil-twin brother". Afterwards, at Yōto's house, as Tsukushi scavenges pictures of Yōto's "twin", Yōto realizes something about Emi, as Ponta's "little sister" is actually his pet rabbit.
9	"The Happy Prince" "Kōfuku na Ōji" (幸福な王子)	June 8, 2013
Yōto is on his way to school, still bothered by Emi's wishes and Tsukiko's cold behavior towards him, and along the way he meets Ponta, who informs him that his rabbit has gone missing. Yōto realizes that Emi's wish of being Ponta's sister has been cancelled. He makes up with Azusa at school and asks her to help him find Ponta's lost rabbit. Emi and Tsukiko have a swimming contest in which the result is a draw, and after the contest Emi cancels her wish for all the girls in the school to wear swimsuits. Ponta later reclaims his lost rabbit thanks to Azusa's efforts and remembers Emi's and Yōto's close relationship, much to Yōto's bewilderment. The following morning, Emi cancels all her wishes after badmouthing Yōto, who later realizes that not all of Emi's wishes were lifted, with parts of the school still looking Italian. Tsukushi reveals to Yōto that she is transferring to Italy. Suddenly, Emi is seen contemplating suicide at the top of the school's tower. Azusa tells Yōto how to get to the top of the tower and he speaks to Emi to appease their situation. Yōto and Emi discover that Azusa is being possessed by the cat god after Azusa's wish of becoming a new person. The cat god explains that it was all Yōto's wish of turning their school into Italy from the start and that Emi is only a minor tool for its fulfillment. Initially, Emi wishes for the cat god to go to hell, which would take Azusa's body along with it and the cat god tells Yōto he can spare Azusa by cancelling his wishes, sacrificing Emi for Azusa. Instead, Yōto forcibly kisses Azusa, removing her from the cat god's control while canceling Yōto's wish and sparing Emi in the end.
10	"The Longest" "Ichiban Nagai to Iu Koto" (一番長いということ)	June 15, 2013
As Yōto's cancellation of his wish only took a partial effect at his school along with the cat statue's sudden disappearance, Azusa becomes madly in love with Yōto, much to Mai's annoyance. Checking up on Tsukushi, Tsukushi prompts both Yōto and Mai to make amends before she leaves for Italy but fails. Later, Yōto finds Tsukiko lamenting in his room as she hides inside Yōto's hug pillow but is later found out by Yōto himself. Tsukiko later leaves Yōto's room after realizing that Yōto met Emi long before she did, despite her earlier claims that she was the one who knew Yōto the longest. Yōto finds airline tickets to Rome and a letter sent by Tsukiko's grandparents. Meanwhile, as Yōto takes Emi for a stroll, Emi notices that something is troubling Yōto and tells him to sort it out. At the Tsutsukakushi residence, Yōto (disguised as his "evil twin") and Tsukushi talk about the latter's deceased parents and disapproval of going to Italy to live with their grandparents. Tsukushi intends to look for concrete evidence of her late mother and them living together through old photos, but ends out empty-handed. Tsukushi and Tsukiko then claim that they had met Yōto in the past and then search for evidence regarding it, but only find an unfocused picture of the sibling's late mother. While tagging along with Tsukiko, Azusa comes to intervene and has a pep talk with Yōto. Afterwards, Tsukiko expresses her jealousy towards Azusa to Yōto. Claiming that meeting Yōto the longest would give her the advantage, Tsukiko wishes to see the past herself, followed by Yōto. Suddenly, a rabbit possessed by the cat god grants their wish.
11	"Inside the Tsutsukakushi Home" "Tsutsukakushi-san no Ie no Naka" (筒隠さんの家の中)	June 22, 2013
Tsukiko and Yōto are brought back ten years in the past by the cat god. As they head to the Tsutsukakushi mansion, they meet the younger Ponta, Mai, Azusa, and eventually Yōto, much to Tsukiko's amazement. Shortly thereafter, they meet Tsukiko's mother, Tsukasa, who is brash yet somehow soft towards the younger Yōto, who at the same time badmouths him. Through the younger Yōto, Yōto and Tsukiko are invited in for dinner at Tsukasa's mansion, which is in slight disarray. Here, Yōto and Tsukiko discover that Tsukasa is currently living alone and the younger Yōto constantly visits her to keep Tsukasa company, much to the shock of Yōto and Tsukiko. Meanwhile, Yōto claims that he does not remember anything about interacting with Tsukasa, and later learns that her daughters are currently living in Italy after the death of Tsukasa's husband. The following morning, Yōto stumbles on a young Tsukiko and later Tsukushi, who is deeply hurt by their mother abandoning them. Tsukasa arrives, causing Tsukushi to harshly run off, and Tsukiko then reprimands Tsukasa for being a horrible mother. Back in the mansion, a drunk Tsukasa dresses the younger Yōto in girl's clothes as a drunk Tsukiko lies atop Yōto. Some time later, Tsukiko finds Tsukasa sewing clothes for her daughters. Tsukasa laments as the results of her inability to take care of her daughters has led her to her dwindling state as she ultimately passes out.
12	"The Pervert Prince and the Memories that Don't Exist" "Hentai Ouji to Kioku no Soto" (変態王子と記憶の外)	June 29, 2013
While a sick Tsukasa is being treated by the younger Yōto, the young Tsukushi, along with Tsukiko, agrees to visit their mother once again after Yōto persuades them. At the mansion, the young Tsukushi and Tsukiko wear the clothes their mother made by hand. Knowing that their mother loved them, the young Tsukushi laments over wanting to have memories with her mother. The younger Yōto reprimands Tsukushi, but nonetheless, gives her his precious memories with Tsukasa for their sake by wishing to the cat god, resulting in the current Yōto forgetting all about meeting the Tsutsukakushis and Emi in the past. Meanwhile, Yōto and Tsukiko return to the present. After heading back to the mansion, Tsukushi decides on not going to Italy and afterwards, Yōto and Tsukiko share a kiss. Days later, Yōto, along with Tsukiko, Tsukushi, Azusa, Emi, and Mai have fun at an amusement park.

== Reception ==
The manga sold 22,076 copies in the week of August 22 to August 28, 2011.
