= Schoolgirl Strikers =

2014 video game and its franchise

- Cover of the first Blu-ray volume of Schoolgirl Strikers: Animation Channel as released by Warner Home Video in Japan.

スクールガール ストライカーズ (Sukūrugāru sutoraikāzu)
- Genre: Visual novel RPG
- Video game
- Developer: Square Enix
- Publisher: Square Enix
- Directed by: Ishiyama Takanari
- Produced by: Mizumachi Minoru Tadashi, Akashio Hiroyuki
- Genre: Action, Sci-fi, Spy, Superheroes, Visual novel-RPG
- Platform: iOS 7.0 and above, Android 2.3.3 and above
- Released: Schoolgirl Strikers: JP: April 10, 2014; Schoolgirl Strikers 2: JP: May 8, 2018
- Anime television series

Schoolgirl Strikers: Animation Channel
- Directed by: Hiroshi Nishikiori
- Produced by: Yūichirō Shiji; Ryūtarō Kawakami; Kaoru Suzuki
- Written by: Takao Yoshioka
- Music by: Mizuto Suzuki, Kengo Tokusashi
- Studio: J.C.Staff
- Licensed by: Crunchyroll
- Original network: Tokyo MX, BS11, AT-X, KBS, Sun TV
- Original run: January 7, 2017 – April 1, 2017
- Episodes: 13
- Video game

Schoolgirl Strikers: Twinkle Melodies
- Developer: Square Enix; Taito
- Publisher: Square Enix
- Music by: Rhythm, Visual novel-RPG
- Platform: iOS 7.0 and above, Android 2.3.3 and above
- Released: November 13, 2017
- Radio
- Schoolgirl Strikers: Radio Channel
- icon

Schoolgirl Strikers (スクールガールストライカーズ, Sukūrugāru Sutoraikāzu) is a Japanese social network game developed and published by Square Enix.

== Plot ==
The newly established private high school for girls, Goryoukan Academy, has a hidden face that people on the outside do not know about. The world you know is under threat by aliens, named "Oburi" (apparitions). These enemies are too strong for normal humans, and are especially threatening due to the fact that they can travel through to the 'fourth' dimension where they can be safe. For some reason, certain young girls are able to harness the power to transverse these dimensions, and enter a 'fifth' dimension - a parallel universe.

The only ones capable of fighting the enemy of mankind are girls known as "Strikers", who have the ability to sense the fifth dimension. Goryoukan Academy is actually an organization that seeks out girls who are more than meets the eye and trains them up for the "Fifth Force", a combat force created to subjugate the Oburi.

There are endless amounts of parallel universes, all of which are similar but run in their own way. The Strikers are able to fight the Oburi by searching these alternate worlds for alternative "memory cards" (Memoca) costumes that are usable by them and effective against the "Oburi".

The player has been chosen by a mysterious person to lead a group of 5 girls in defeating an enemy that is threatening to destroy the world. Why the player was chosen and who they are is a mystery.

== Characters ==
=== Fifth Force ===
==== 2nd Team - Coconut Vega ====
- Hazuki Shiranui (Leader)

Voiced by: Misako Tomioka

- Mari Yukishiro

Voiced by: Asami Tano

- Imina Ibuki

Voiced by: Yū Kobayashi

- Ryoko Shinonome

Voiced by: Nozomi Yamamoto

- Ako Takamine

Voiced by: Haruna Momono

==== 3rd Team - Procyon Pudding ====
- Amane Kyoubashi (Leader)

Voiced by: Mariya Ise

- Sasa Momokawa

Voiced by: Ai Nonaka

- Haruka Kurimoto

Voiced by: Rie Murakawa

- Rinoda Mano

Voiced by: Lynn

- Itsumi Natsume

Voiced by: Yumi Uchiyama

==== 4th Team - Biscuit Sirius ====
- Niho Hinomiya (Leader)

Voiced by: Ibuki Kido

- Isari Haishima
- Kagari Haishima

Voiced by: Rie Kugimiya

- Yukie Aoi

Voiced by: Yui Makino

- Kaede Yamabuki

Voiced by: Yasuko Fujino

==== 5th Team - Almond Fomalhaut ====
- Charlotte Weiss (Leader)

Voiced by: Kana Asumi

- Tatiana Alexandrovna Krovskaya

Voiced by: Sora Amamiya

- Faye Lee

Voiced by: Kotori Koiwai

- Monica Blueash

Voiced by: Minako Kotobuki

- Noel-Jaune Beart

Voiced by: Yui Horie

==== 6th Team - Altair Torte ====
- Tsubame Miyama (Leader)

Voiced by: Kaori Ishihara

- Satoka Sumihara

Voiced by: Rina Hidaka

- Io Yaginuma

Voiced by: Miyuki Sawashiro

- Yumi Sajima

Voiced by: Kana Hanazawa

- Mana Namori

Voiced by: Yui Ogura

==== 7th Team - Schokolad Mira ====
- Aoi Uraba (Leader)

Voiced by: Asami Seto

- Chitose Yui/Yui Chitose

Voiced by: Risa Taneda

- Hotaru Sakamiya/Sakamiya Hotaru

Voiced by: Kaori Fukuhara

- Shiori Kannagi/Kannagi Shiori

Voiced by: Haruka Tomatsu

- Chika Wakatsuki/Wakatsuki Chika

Voiced by: Miku Itō

==== Others ====
- Sachiko Tanaka

Voiced by: Chiwa Saito

- Akara Origami

Voiced by: Yuko Sanpei

- Hina Origami

Voiced by: Ayaka Asai

- Koori Origami

Voiced by: Haruka Terui

- Morgana

Voiced by: Kotono Mitsuishi

- Koharu Minato

Voiced by: Kaede Hondo

- Midori Hayakasaka

Voiced by: Haruka Shiraishi

- Tierra Sensei

Voiced by: Yū Asakawa

=== NPCs ===
- Moshune - モシュネ

Voiced by: Rie Kugimiya

- Hana-chan - ハナちゃん

Voiced by: Chiwa Saito

== Gameplay ==
Schoolgirl Strikers is a card collecting mobile game with RPG and visual novel influences. It was released in 2014 and is available for iOS and Android devices. Some of the things that make Schoolgirl Strikers different from an average card collecting game are the special story missions and the 3D battle system; along with the ability to dress the girls up as the player sees fit. The way the battle system as a whole works is also quite different; the player can choose any girls they want (limited to 5 at a time) to be in their team as long as the player has at least one card of them. Then the player adds main and sub "Memocas" to them instead of simply putting the cards themselves in a battle deck. The main Memocas also affect the girls' appearances in battle.

== Media ==
=== Anime ===
An original anime television adaption has been announced, Hiroshi Nishikiori directed the series at J.C.Staff with scripts written by Takao Yoshioka and Mizuto Suzuki and Kengo Tokusashi produced the music at Square Enix. The anime aired between January 7 to April 1, 2017, on Tokyo MX with further broadcasting on BS11, AT-X, KBS, and Sun TV; Crunchyroll streamed the series. The designs for their combat outfits as key visual were unveiled in November 2016. The series ran for 13 episodes and released across seven BD/DVD volumes.

==== Episode list ====
No.	Official English title (Note: All English titles are taken from Crunchyroll.) Original Japanese title	Original release date
1	"Deploy! Fifth Force" "Shutsugeki! Fifusu fōsu" (出撃！フィフス・フォース)	January 7, 2017
2	"Train! And Our First Victory" "Tokkun! Soshite Hajimete no shōri" (特訓！そして初めての勝利)	January 14, 2017
3	"Formed! Altair Torte" "Kessei! Arutairu torute" (結成！アルタイル・トルテ)	January 21, 2017
4	"Arrived! The Beautiful Detective Everyone's Talking About" "Tōjō! Uwasa no bishōjo tantei" (登場！ウワサの美少女探偵)	January 28, 2017
5	"White Hot! Team Battle" "Hakunetsu! Chīmu taikō-sen" (白熱！チーム対抗戦)	February 4, 2017
6	"Raid! The Super SF Plan" "Kyūshū! SF Dai Sakusen" (急襲！SF大作戦)	February 11, 2017
7	"Clash! The Two Formidable Enemies" "Gekitotsu futari no Kyōteki" (激突！二つの強敵)	February 18, 2017
8	"Showdown! The Three Origami Sisters" "Taiketsu! Origami Sanshimai" (対決！降神三姉妹)	February 25, 2017
9	"Youth! The Crimson Duel" "Seishun! Kurenai no kettō" (青春！紅の決闘)	March 4, 2017
10	"Arrived! The Lone Knight" "Sanjō! Kodoku no kishi" (参上！孤独の騎士)	March 11, 2017
11	"Hair-raising! Unidentified Creature Spotted in the Snowy Mountains" "Senritsu! Taisetsuzan ni mikakuninseibutsu o mita" (戦慄！大雪山に未確認生物を見た)	March 18, 2017
12	"Change! The Three Sisters Have Disappeared" "Kyūten! Kieta sanshimai" (急転！消えた三姉妹)	March 25, 2017
13	"Final Battle! Fifth Force Forever" "Kessen! Fifusu fōzu yo eien ni" (決戦！フィフス・フォースよ永遠に)	April 1, 2017

== Schoolgirl Strikers: Twinkle Melodies ==
Schoolgirl Strikers: Twinkle Melodies (スクールガールストライカーズ ～トゥインクルメロディーズ～, Sukurugāru Sutorāikazu ~Tuinkuru Merodīzu~) is a spin-off game also released for iPhone and Android devices. Set in the same universe as the original game, Twinkle Melodies is a rhythm game focused on a new team named Apricot Regulus, who want to be a Japanese idol group due to their abilities for singing. Characters from the original Schoolgirl Strikers appears in Twinkle Melodies, with the exception of Chocolate Mira and Almond Fomalhaut groups as the Others as well. The game features an anime opening and a new character design.
