= Nakaimo – My Sister Is Among Them! =

Japanese light novel series

- Nakaimo - My Sister Is Among Them!
- Cover of the first light novel

この中に1人、妹がいる！ (Kono Naka ni Hitori, Imouto ga Iru!)
- Genre: Romantic comedy, harem, mystery
- Light novel
- Written by: Hajime Taguchi
- Illustrated by: CUTEG
- Published by: Media Factory
- Imprint: MF Bunko J
- Original run: August 25, 2010 – March 25, 2013
- Volumes: 10
- Manga

Kono Naka ni Hitori, Imouto ga Iru! - Who is "IMOUTO"?
- Illustrated by: Mottun*
- Published by: Media Factory
- Magazine: Comic Alive
- Original run: April 2011 – December 2013
- Volumes: 5
- Anime television series

Nakaimo – My Sister is Among Them!
- Directed by: Munenori Nawa
- Produced by: Yasuhiro Kuroda; Masatoshi Ishizuka; Katsumi Koike; Gō Tanaka; Yoshiaki Uraki; Oshi Yoshinuma; Takuya Kodama
- Written by: Gō Zappa
- Music by: Hikaru Nanase
- Studio: Studio Gokumi
- Licensed by: NA: Sentai Filmworks
- Original network: TBS, MBS, CBC, BS-TBS
- Original run: July 6, 2012 – September 28, 2012
- Episodes: 12 + OVA

Nakaimo - My Sister Is Among Them! (Japanese: この中に1人、妹がいる！, Hepburn: Kono Naka ni Hitori, Imouto ga Iru!) is a Japanese light novel series by Hajime Taguchi. It was adapted into an anime television series by Studio Gokumi. The anime was aired between July 6 and September 28, 2012. The anime series is licensed by Sentai Filmworks and streamed on Crunchyroll and Anime Network.

== Synopsis ==
The Mikadono Group (帝野グループ, Mikadono Gurūpu) is a worldwide business company based in Japan and led by Kumagoro Mikadono. He names his son Shogo heir to his position in the company. However, after Kumagoro dies, his widow Kanoko becomes the new acting chairman as Shogo transfers to his father's alma mater Miryuin Private Academy. According to his father's will, Shogo will take over the company after he graduates provided that he finds a life partner before then. Fortunately, there is a large female population at Miryuin Academy to choose from. Life at the academy will not be all smooth sailing, however. He is immediately popular because of his name and position as heir to Kumagoro's company and has caught the eye of several female students. To complicate matters further, although he was raised as an only child, Shogo apparently has a younger half-sister who was raised separately who also goes to the same school and intends to get closer to him without revealing her true identity. How will he act knowing that any girl he chooses to be his life partner may also be his sister?

== Characters ==
=== Main characters ===
Shogo Mikadono (帝野 将悟, Mikadono Shōgo)
Voiced by: Takahiro Sakurai (Japanese); Clint Bickham (English)
The male protagonist who is the heir of the Mikadono Group. For him to take over as chairman of the Group, he needs to graduate from school as well as find a life partner. However, things become complicated when he learns that his father, Kumagoro, had an illegitimate daughter who is watching over him as well as attending the same school. This leads to Shogo trying to find his sister. He has a scar on his forehead from an accident when he was kid that caused him to lose some of his memories. Eventually Shogo chooses Konoe to be his lover but she is revealed to be Kumagoro's illegitimate daughter. Eventually, it is revealed that he is not Kumagoro's biological son and thus they are not related.

Konoe Tsuruma (鶴眞 心乃枝, Tsuruma Konoe)
Voiced by: Kaori Ishihara (Japanese); Monica Rial (English)
A black-haired young girl who attends the same school as Shogo and also the first friend he makes on his first day of his new life. Very curious and believing in destined meetings, she is in the same class as Shogo as well as the class representative. She loves creme puffs. She revealed later that she was Shogo's childhood friend and feels responsible for the accident which landed him in hospital. She has the same phone as the mysterious shadowy figure shown once calling Shogo. It is later revealed that she was also the one who sent him the cake, photo, and action figure on his birthday. She initially called him using the voice of Perin a character from "Transforming Warrior Granberion". She is in love with Shogo. This is underscored when she tells Shogo, "When we were kids, I wanted to be your sister. I figured we could be together forever that way." The phone she used was a prototype developed by her father with a rare voice changer feature. Eventually she becomes Shogo's lover but also reveals that she is Kumagoro's illegitimate daughter. However, in volume 9 it is discovered that Shogo is not Kumagoro's biological son and thus she is not really Shogo's sister.

Miyabi Kannagi (神凪 雅, Kannagi Miyabi)
Voiced by: Ayane Sakura (Japanese); Brittney Karbowski (English)
Another classmate of Shogo and a member of the swimming club. Miyabi revealed that she met Shogo at the hospital where he was recovering from his accident—whenever her father went in for treatments, she would play outside with him. When Shogo first attempted to speak to her upon meeting her in class, she refused to talk to him. After that, she overheard his conversation with Konoe and after seeing them almost kiss, demands that he kiss her. She reasons that after Shogo calls Konoe "just a classmate," it should be fine for him to kiss her as well. When she tells Shogo of their previous relationship together, she also confesses (with Konoe present) that she fell in love with Shogo as a child and along with Konoe was elated upon learning of his transfer to their school. She is competitive with Konoe about wanting to marry Shogo, to the point where they will argue about it in front of him. As the story progresses, she often interrupts romantic moments between Shogo and Konoe. At the end of the anime and in volume 4 of the novel, she is believed to be his sister. However, in volume 8, after another DNA test it is discovered that she is actually his cousin. Eventually, Miyabi becomes Shogo's stepsister when her father and Kanoko marry.

Rinka Kunitachi (国立 凜香, Kunitachi Rinka)
Voiced by: Ayana Taketatsu (Japanese); Maggie Flecknoe (English)
Rinka is the blonde first-year student council vice-president of Miryuin Private Academy and it is implied that she was brought up in a noble family. After Shogo transferred into Miryuin, Konoe calls her "a princess to the core." Rinka keeps Mana in line and is shown to be very good at dancing. She is a distant character who has a tendency to be competitive. Rinka reveals that school director Genda asked her to find Shogo's sister so that he would have leverage when working with the Mikadono Group. Rinka uses Sagara's phone to make her fake sister announcement to threaten the director. Shogo was able to figure out her scheme and subsequently volunteered to pretend to be her lover to invalidate her engagement to director Genda's son. Thereafter, Rinka decided to pursue Shogo as her true boyfriend.

Mana Tendou (天導 愛菜, Tendō Mana)
Voiced by: Asuka Ōgame (Japanese); Emily Neves (English)
The student council president of Miryuin Private Academy. She has a childish personality, and is generally on the quieter side except for big events, where she gets really excited and tends to be more outgoing and loud.

Mei Sagara (嵯峨良 芽依, Sagara Mei)
Voiced by: Rina Hidaka (Japanese); Meg McDonald (English)
A third-year silver-haired bespectacled girl who dresses as a witch. She runs the Lyrical Sister Café which she describes as "a dream-like café where anyone can become an older brother or older sister!" Prior to the story, her biological parents abandoned her as a toddler because of her mathematical intellect and she was adopted by a university professor. She lived with her adoptive mother who owned and ran the café until she died. Afterwards Mei lived with her father in Massachusetts until she earned enough money to buy back the café. She and Konoe have the same brand phone. It is later revealed that she knows the identity of Shogo's sister, but does not want to expose her to the Mikadono family because she is an illegitimate child. After Shogo promises to protect her, she responds that she will reveal his sister's identity if he proves that he can be a good older brother.

Yuzurina Houshou (宝生 柚璃奈, Hōshō Yuzurina)
Voiced by: Yui Ogura (Japanese); Meaghan Avocato (English)
A mysterious girl who poses as Shogo's real sister. However she is revealed to be responsible for the incidents that have occurred around him at the school. Her real name is Nayuri Danno (檀埜 那百合, Danno Nayuri), a famous former child actress who starred as Perin in "Transforming Warrior Granberion", Shogo's favorite show during his childhood. It is revealed that she is in allegiance with rivals of the Mikadono Group to cause a scandal for Shogo.

=== Supporting characters ===
Ikusu Mizutani (水谷 衣楠, Mizutani Ikusu)
Voiced by: Ami Koshimizu (Japanese); Kara Greenberg (English)
A member of the Seiryu Association. Initially introduced as "Mister X", she was sent to investigate on the identity of Shogo's younger sister while disguising herself as a male student in Miryuin Private Academy. She often sneaks into Shogo's apartment to use his shower as part of her routine. She is trying to become a modern day ninja, and as the Seiryu Association is men-only, she disguised herself as a guy to become part of the association. She often puts Shogo in awkward situations.

Kumagoro Mikadono (帝野 熊五郎, Mikadono Kumagorō)
Voiced by: Rikiya Koyama (Japanese); John Swasey (English)
Shogo's father, who was the chairman of the Mikadono Group. He is also a friend of Konoe's father. He is assumed to have fathered an illegitimate daughter but Kanoko does not want anything to do with the child, thus Shogo has no leads as to who the girl's identity is.

Kanoko Mikadono (帝野 鹿野子, Mikadono Kanoko)
Voiced by: Aya Hisakawa (Japanese); Shelley Calene-Black (English)
Shogo's mother. She becomes the acting chairman of the Mikadono Group until Shogo is ready to take over.

Risa Seri (瀬利 吏沙, Seri Risa)
Voiced by: Ayako Kawasumi (Japanese); Kaytha Coker (English)
Secretary and a close aide of Kanoko. Shogo entrusted her help to perform a DNA test to verify his real sister. However, she was discovered by Ikusu to be in allegiance with Yuzurina to invalidate Shogo's bid to take over the Mikadono Group.

Kurumi Kashinoki (樫木 来実, Kashinoki Kurumi)
Voiced by: Maho Matsunaga (Japanese); Brittany Deans (English)
A first year student and a waitress at Lyrical Sisters Café. She is also cheerful and cute.

Maiko Kotori (小都里 まい子, Kotori Maiko)
Voiced by: Arisa Noto (Japanese); Tiffany Grant (English)
She is the diminutive homeroom teacher in the class Shogo attends. Her personality is very aggressive, and she hates people who ask stupid questions. On top of that, she looks like a child due to her small stature.

== Media ==
=== Anime ===
Nakaimo - My Sister Is Among Them!, was adapted into a twelve episode anime with a special OVA episode. In April, 2012 it was announced that Studio Gokumi would be adapting the light novel series into an anime for an airing sometime in June. Between April 5, and June 28 promotional ads were streamed announcing the anime's start date to be July 6, 2012 by TBS. In September 2012 Japanese production company Media factory released the entire series on DVD and Blu-ray, a special unaired OVA entitled "Brother, Sister, Lover" was bundled with the release. In addition to the OVA, bonus material included footage from a special event that took place on July 16. The Blu-ray's jacket also features cover art done by the illustrator of the light novel series.

Shortly after its first airing in Japan, Crunchyroll announced in July of that year that it would stream live a subtitled version of the series with the new episodes that come out. In addition, Anime Network also streamed episodes alongside crunchyroll. Sentai Filmworks later announced during Otakon 2012 that took place in late July, that it had acquired the license to the series. Sentai confirmed the cast for the English dub in October 2013. The following month, the series was released in North America on November 12, 2013.

No.	Title	Original airdate^{α}
1	"The Voice of My Unfamiliar Little Sister" "Mishiranu Imōto kara no Koe" (見知らぬ妹からの声)	July 6, 2012
Shogo Mikadono, heir to the Mikadono Group, enrolls in Miryuin Private Academy, also having to find his potential wife there. He saves a girl named Konoe Tsuruma from a oncoming truck outside a bakery, and she later shows him to his homeroom class after they briefly share cream puffs at a park. Shogo explains to Konoe that he received a scar on his forehead after an accident as a child. After Konoe is summoned to a student council meeting, Miyabi Kannagi tries to make a move on Shogo, but he backs out of it. Later at night, he receives a birthday cake and an action figure by mail. After seeing a photo of him as a child being kissed by an unknown girl at an amusement park, he receives a phone call from this girl confirming this. The next morning, he ponders if the girl who chooses to marry will end up being his little sister.
2	"My Sister and the Moonlit Dance" "Imōto to Tsukiyo no Dansu" (妹と月夜のダンス)	July 13, 2012
On the school rooftop, he finds Mei Sagara, an upperclasswoman that dresses as a witch, who reveals that she works at a cosplay café. Later on, he encounters Ikusu Mizutani, a member of the Seiryu Association and initially introduced as Mister X, who explains that his father, Kumagoro Mikadono, had an illegitimate daughter after an affair, and it would be a scandal if Shogo were to marry this girl. Ikusu later transfers into the academy as a male student to keep an eye on him, and then stops by at his place to take a shower. At the student council dance party, after Shogo has a dance with Konoe, a confident Rinka Kunitachi, the student council vice president, challenges him to a dance, receiving quite an applause from the onlookers. Shogo finds a timid Miyabi outside, and he asks to have a dance with her, but the top of her dress later becomes undone. Luckily, Konoe finds the two, and she helps fix Miyabi's dress, much to Shogo's relief.
3	"My Sister's Seduction" "Imōto-tachi no Yūwaku" (妹たちの誘惑)	July 20, 2012
Konoe and Miyabi visit Shogo to teach him to love women, after they mistakenly saw Ikusu on top of Shogo the day before. The two girls treat Shogo as their older brother, clinging to him throughout the day. At night, they undress from their pajamas on his bed, making him so uncomfortable that he is unable to sleep. The next day at school, he tries to avoid them and hides in the student council office. Mana Tendou, the student council president, suggests Shogo to become friends with Konoe and Miyabi, since he cannot date either one. Later on, after accompanying Miyabi to shop for a bathing suit for her, they run back to her place soaking wet from the rain. While he prepares to take a bath, he suspects that Miyabi may be his little sister, after taking notice of the toy shampoo bottle. She admits wanting to marry him, but he turns her down due to the suspicion.
4	"My Sister's Hero is Her Big Brother!" "Imōto no Hīrō wa Onīsama!" (妹のヒーローはお兄さま！)	July 27, 2012
The following day at school, things get awkward between Shogo and Miyabi, which brings concern for Konoe. Shogo tells Konoe that Miyabi may be his little sister. Ikusu later contacts Shogo to inform him of a prototype phone, having voice-changing capabilities, which may have connections to the calls he receives from the mysterious girl who claims to be his sister. After realizing that Konoe might have that phone, he searches everywhere for her, finally finding her at a park holding the phone. She reveals that she was the one kissing him in the photo he received, and she explains that they were childhood friends when his father was alive then. She then also says that Shogo injured his head while saving her at a crosswalk from an oncoming car. Konoe confesses that she used the altered voice as a prank, not realizing how much trouble she has caused for Shogo. When Miyabi finds the two, she reveals that she and Shogo used to pretend to get married in the courtyard of the hospital during her visits. Since both Konoe and Miyabi want to become his wife, they decide to start a battle to see who would be the better wife.
5	"My Little Sister Won't Let Me Sleep" "Imōto ga Nekasete Kurenai" (妹が寝かせてくれない)	August 17, 2012
Shogo is constantly being awoken by his supposed little sister every early morning on a daily basis, much to his annoyance. Sleep deprived, Shogo is unwittingly invited by Mei to sleep with her in her secret room at school, much to his uneasiness. Later on, after Shogo waits for Miyabi during her swim practice, they go on a date to the Lyrical Sisters Café, being greeted and served by the waitress Kurumi Kashinoki, but his order does not go well. While resting in Mei's room at school the next day, Shogo learns that Mei is an adopted child of a college professor from Massachusetts and is running her shop for the sake of her late mother. Shogo then discovers the prototype phone in Mei's room, and while later reporting this to Ikusu, Shogo learns that Mei is closing the shop for her leave to Massachusetts.
6	"My Maid Sisters Have Cat Ears" "Nekomimi Meido na Imōto-tachi" (猫耳メイドな妹たち)	August 24, 2012
Due to her shop failing, Mei is told by her adoptive father to come back to Massachusetts. In response to this, Shogo tells Mei he is willing to get her shop back on track, with the help from all of his friends. After a successful advertising made by Shogo, Mei's shop earns much more and is now able to stand on its own. Mei tried to seduce Shogo later that night, but Shogo gets an interrupted phone call from Ikusu, who discovers that Mei might be the girl that calls Shogo every morning. Shogo confronts Mei because of this, and she admits that she was distracting him from knowing his real little sister to prevent any torment by his family and scandals from his company. However, Shogo firmly declares that he will do anything in his power to protect his little sister. In exchange, Mei promises him to introduce him to her if he is able enough to do so, as Shogo asks Mei for her to take care of his little sister.
7	"My Little Sister is Disciplined and Beautiful!" "Imōto wa, Kiritsu Tadashiku Utsukushiku!" (妹は、規律正しく美しく！)	August 24, 2012
Konoe and Miyabi became increasingly intimate with Shogo, as the latter fears of whoever he chooses between the two as his wife could be his biological little sister. As a precaution, Ikusu suggests of applying a DNA test on both of them, to which Shogo complies, with the help of Risa Seri, his mother's secretary. While Konoe agrees on taking the test, Miyabi strongly declines for mistaking Shogo as a fetishist. Afterwards, a board of directors come to inspect the academy's performance. While they have a meeting with Shogo, a person who claims herself as his little sister makes an announcement over the intercom and blackmails Shogo, threatening to expose his secrets if he tries to find her but also telling him to be wary of his surroundings. Finding this to be in bad taste by the board, as a response, the academy's student council appoints Shogo as their morality officer. As student council members act more strict over the students for their misconduct, Ikusu suspects Rinka as the one behind the blackmailing incident.
8	"My Sister Resisted" "Imōto wa Aragatteita" (妹はあらがっていた)	August 31, 2012
Shogo gets himself admonished by Rinka for not properly acting as a morality officer. Afterwards, Shogo and Ikusu have a double-date with Rinka and Mana at an amusement park for the purpose of thoroughly investigating Rinka as suggested by Ikusu. After their date, Shogo takes notice of a phone accessory he bought from the park, resembling one that Mei had, which Rinka once noted she had seen it before. Shogo confronts Rinka, concluding her to be the one who blackmailed him. Although admitting this, she solely wanted to warn him that Genda, one of the board members whose son is betrothed to Rinka, tasked her to investigate information on the illegitimate daughter to ultimately blackmail the Mikadono Group. Against with the scheme and the engagement, Rinka used Mei's phone and its voice-changing function as a means to express her contradiction. Reflecting on the time they spent during their date, Shogo volunteers to become Rinka's fake boyfriend to call off her engagement, which turn out to be successful. Afterwards, Rinka pursues Shogo to become her true boyfriend.
9	"Surprise Attack! Little Sister Warning!!" "Kyūshū! Imōto Chūihō!!" (急襲!妹注意報!!)	September 7, 2012
A girl named Yuzurina Houshou moves next door to Shogo and introduces herself as his little sister. After Yuzurina explains to him the situation, Shogo receives a call from his mother, Kanoko Mikadono, and tells him on bringing with him a female accomplice during the Mikadono Group party. While frolicking in the swimming pool, the girls close to Shogo learn of Yuzurina's sibling relationship with him, much to their disbelief. After Yuzurina agrees to take a DNA test, the other girls argue on who will Shogo choose as his accomplice to the party. Later at his apartment, Konoe makes dinner for Shogo and later presents herself as his "dessert". While Shogo teases Konoe, a bewildered Yuzurina overhears them. Shogo then sees Konoe off to her place, and when she tells him to kiss her, a shocked Miyabi witnesses this. Afterwards, Shogo receives the result from the DNA test, confirming his sibling relationship with Yuzurina.
10	"My Blooming Sisters" "Hanasaku Imōto-tachi" (花咲く妹たち)	September 14, 2012
With the help of Yuzurina's influence, Shogo invites the five girls to the Mikadono Group party. Miyabi has been acting indifferently during the party and has sudden gone missing. While looking for her, Shogo and Ikusu reveal that Seri is in allegiance with someone who is plotting to remove Shogo's candidacy as the next head of the Mikadono Group via a scandal, and Ikusu advises Shogo to lie low for the time being. Afterwards, Shogo reports his findings to Yuzurina, who has found Miyabi in the hotel, and while dismayed about Seri's scheme, he adds that she is fine with publicizing herself as Shogo's little sister. After being told to live a virtuous life by Yuzurina, Shogo heads back to the party. However, he is lunged by a drunk Miyabi who is eventually rendered unconscious, taking her to a hotel room and waiting for her to wake up. After taking a shower, Miyabi attempts to have sex with Shogo, but she then cries, asking Shogo to never leave her. Later, after seeing the other girls off, Kanoko discusses with Shogo about what has happened and discovers that Seri is actually responsible for inviting the girls.
11	"My Sister's Trap" "Imōto no Wana" (妹の罠)	September 21, 2012
While having breakfast with Shogo, Yuzurina reveals that she is not the person who says that she married Shogo during his father's funeral. After being absent from class, Miyabi receives a visit from Shogo and Konoe, but the latter leaves abruptly to get some tea for them. After a moment of awkward silence, Miyabi proposes to go on a date with Shogo, much to his shock. That evening, Yuzurina apprises Shogo that Konoe was the person who came to his father's funeral asking for marriage, much to his disbelief. The next day, Miyabi returns to class much livelier yet Konoe worries for her. Realizing something, Shogo barges into the student council office and asks Rinka for information. Days later, Shogo and Miyabi head out on their date while Ikusu caught a glimpse of Yuzurina as a character in "Transforming Warrior Granberion", Shogo's favorite show during his childhood.
12	"My Sister Was Always Beside Me" "Imōto wa Zutto, Soba ni Ita" (妹はずっと、そばにいた)	September 28, 2012
After their date, Miyabi, kissing him by surprise, asks Shogo to be her boyfriend, but he turns her down and she tearfully storms off. Shogo and Ikusu later turn to Yuzurina, who is really a child actress named Nayuri Danno, who played as Perin in "Transforming Warrior Granberion", learning that she is working with Seri to alter the results of the DNA tests to create a scandal since Miyabi is his true younger sister. Shogo hears word from Mei that Miyabi had an accident during her pool practice and was sent to the school's infirmary. When he goes to see Miyabi, she reveals that she was the one who asked Shogo to marry her back at the funeral, and she was only trying to hide her sibling relationship with him so that they could be lovers. Yuzurina was the one who coerced Miyabi to dispose of a letter containing evidence of her sibling relationship with Shogo, deceiving Miyabi to convince Shogo to be with her. Shogo reveals Yuzurina's true identity and nature to Miyabi, but he also reassures that they will remain as siblings, forgiving her for all what has happened. Some time later, Shogo and the other girls congratulate Miyabi over her performance during a swim match, while Ikusu fails to locate Yuzurina. Then, Shogo gets chased again by the girls after their argument over him.
OVA	"Brother, Sister, Lover" "Ani, Imōto, Koibito" (兄、妹、恋人)	March 27, 2013
Miyabi takes advantage of Shogo over the girls who wish to get close with him under the pretense of being siblings and adds that she will decide on who she will approve as Shogo's girlfriend and future partner. In response to this Mei and Ikusu hold a dating contest on Shogo where Miyabi will choose the most suitable partner for her brother from Konoe, Rinka, Mana, Mei and Ikusu. During the dates, Miyabi continuously distracts and drags Shogo away from the girls out of jealousy. Meanwhile, in Konoe's turn, she takes both Miyabi and Shogo out to an amusement park. Ultimately, Konoe brings the group to a bridal experience fair where the girls wear wedding dresses to get a first-hand experience of being brides. On Konoe and Shogo's wedding photo, the pseudo-couple allow Miyabi to be with them at the picture. Afterwards, the other girls, donning their wedding outfits, ask on who will Shogo choose next to take a wedding picture with.

== Reception ==
The English language adaptation of the anime, released in North America received mixed reviews. Allen Moody from THEM anime reviews, gave the series one star out of five. He called the plot a simple mystery that isn't challenging, and pointed out multiple anime clichés such as the loss of important childhood memories. Andy Hanley from UK Anime Network gave the first four episodes of the series a 2/10 rating citing many plot holes, and "wafer thin" characters. He goes on to say good things though about the character designs and animation as the only redeeming qualities. Chris Beveridge from the Fandom Post gave the series a more positive review saying that there are likeable main characters, with each earning "their time in the sun". Chris had previously given the first two episodes a C rating calling the animation "very cheap and stiff" in a lot of scenes, and Shogo's character "bland". Active Anime also gave the series a good review, describing it as good for people who love romantic comedies with fan service. The review also points out that they left the anime ending on a "pretty good" spot in the story as the light novel series hadn't finished in Japan. Jeff Chuang from Japanator called the series "above average" for its harem genre, but also said it isn't an anime for those who cannot handle the intense sex jokes.

== Notes ==
^α The dates in the source used go by Japanese Standard Time.
