= Girl Friend Beta =

Japanese smartphone game

- Game cover for Girl Friend Beta: Summer Vacation Spent With You

ガールフレンド（仮） (Gāru Furendo Kakko Kari)
- Genre: Romance
- Video game
- Developer: CyberAgent
- Publisher: Ameba
- Genre: Dating simulation, online social, card game
- Platform: iOS, Android
- Released: JP: October 29, 2012
- Manga
- Girl Friend (Kari): Shiina Kokomi-hen ~Koishite Madonna~; Girl Friend (Kari): Murakami Fumio-hen ~Secret Smile~; Girl Friend (Kari): Chloe Lemarie-hen ~Chole to Nihon to Mirai no Tobira~; Girl Friend (Kari): Sakurai Akane-hen ~Kokoro o Komete, Yūki no On Air!~; Girl Friend (Kari) ~Seiō Gakuen Girl's Diary~
- Anime television series
- Directed by: Naotaka Hayashi
- Produced by: Nobuyuki Hosoya; Eiji Katou; Masakazu Nobuyama
- Written by: Michiko Yokote
- Music by: Kenji Kawai
- Studio: Silver Link (Note: Production assistance (制作協力) for all episodes provided by C-Station.)
- Licensed by: Crunchyroll
- Original network: TX Network (TV Tokyo)
- Original run: October 13, 2014 – December 29, 2014
- Episodes: 12
- Video game

Girl Friend Beta: Summer Vacation Spent With You
- Developer: CyberAgent
- Publisher: Bandai Namco Entertainment; Kadokawa Games
- Platform: PlayStation Vita
- Released: JP: November 19, 2015
- Original net animation

Girl Friend Note
- Directed by: Daisuke Tsukushi
- Written by: Michiko Yokote
- Studio: Encourage Films
- Released: October 14, 2016 – October 21, 2016
- Runtime: 10 minutes
- Episodes: 3

Girl Friend Beta (ガールフレンド（仮）, Gāru Furendo Kakko Kari; literally "Girlfriend (provisional)") (Note: "Kari" (仮), alternatively pronounced as kakko kari (かっこかり; lit. "bracket, provisional"), is a permanent part of the actual title. Translating to roughly "provisional title" or "working title", it is often used to denote works-in-progress, however in this case it is used as a joke, since the player's "girlfriends" are not real. Despite the title Girl Friend Beta, the franchise is not actually undergoing beta testing.) is a 2012 Japanese smartphone game developed by CyberAgent for iOS and Android devices. As of June 2014, it had over 5.3 million users. An anime television series produced by Silver Link aired in Japan between October and December 2014. There are also five manga adaptations based on the game, and a PlayStation Vita spin-off game was released in November 2015.

== Gameplay ==
The game is a dating simulator which features over 100 different virtual girls, each with a unique voice actress. The player progresses their relationship with the virtual girlfriend by taking her on dates. The game is free-to-play, however the player pays real-world money to gain premium services. The game features various events that occur, including battle events when bad guys appear. The player can engage in club activities and school class events to solicit romance and increase intimacy with female students. There is a card-based system within the game, where the player collects different cards of varying rarity; each card has different attributes, such as attack and defense costs. Cards can be enhanced by engaging in a part-time job.

== Characters ==
=== Main characters ===
Kokomi Shiina (椎名心実, Shiina Kokomi)
Voiced by: Satomi Satō
A second-year high school student belonging to the rhythmic gymnastics club. She has shoulder-length brown hair and brown eyes. She is said to be the ace of the club and is extremely popular.
Akane Sakurai (櫻井明音, Sakurai Akane)
Voiced by: Rina Satō
A second-year student in the school's broadcasting committee. She has red hair styled in a ponytail and brown eyes. She is a cheerful and kind girl. She has a rather close friendship with fellow club member Tomo Oshii.
Fumio Murakami (村上文緒, Murakami Fumio)
Voiced by: Kaori Nazuka
A third-year student in the book committee. She has silvery-blue hair that is partly braided.
Chloe Lemaire (クロエ・ルメール, Kuroe Rumēru)
Voiced by: Sakura Tange
A third-year French exchange student in the Japanese Culture Research Society. She has long blonde hair and blue eyes.
Erena Mochizuki (望月エレナ, Mochizuki Erena)
Voiced by: Hitomi Harada
A third-year student in the photography club. She also has long blonde hair but wears purple bows, and has green eyes. She is best friends with Fumio Murakami.

=== Other characters ===
- Nonoka Sasahara (笹原野々花, Sasahara Nonoka; Voiced by: Haruka Tomatsu): A third-year student and a member of the pottery club. Her grandfather runs a cake shop, where she becomes a part-time worker.
- Yuzuko Hazuki (葉月柚子, Hazuki Yuzuko; Voiced by: Kaori Ishihara): A first-year student belonging to the Lacrosse Club. She has impressive reflexes and is always in a lively, cheerful mood, often making noise when everyone is gathered around. However, in reality she is lonely. She is Momoko's childhood friend.
- Kanata Amatsu (天都かなた, Amatsu Kanata; Voiced by: Kikuko Inoue): The president of the student council. She appears to be ditzy and sometimes unknowingly becomes a hindrance to other members, with her only known talent is serving tea. Due to her personality, her position as the president makes it questionable to other members.
- Isuzu Shiranui (不知火五十鈴, Shiranui Isuzu; Voiced by: Aoi Yūki): A second-year student who is a member of the Flower Arrangement Club.
- Koruri Tokitani (時谷 小瑠璃, Tokitani Koruri; Voiced by: Yukari Tamura): A third-year student who is a member of the Handicrafts Club.
- Mahiro Natsume (夏目 真尋, Natsume Mahiro; Voiced by: Minori Chihara): A second-year student belonging to the Literature Club.
- Saya Kagurazaka (神楽坂 砂夜, Kagurazaka Saya; Voiced by: Minako Kotobuki): A third-year student belonging to the newspaper club.
- Mutsumi Shigino (鴫野 睦, Shigino Mutsumi; Voiced by: Minami Tsuda)
- Nao Miyoshi (見吉 奈央, Miyoshi Nao; Voiced by: Maaya Uchida)
- Matsuri Kagami (加賀美 茉莉, Kagami Matsuri; Voiced by: Rie Kugimiya): A second-year student who belongs to the Tennis Club.
- Rino Suzukawa (鈴河 凛乃, Suzukawa Rino; Voiced by: Emiri Katō)
- Shinobu Kokonoe (九重 忍, Kokonoe Shinobu; Voiced by: Houko Kuwashima)
- Remi Tamai (玉井 麗巳, Tamai Remi; Voiced by: Noriko Shitaya)
- Tsugumi Harumiya (春宮 つぐみ, Harumiya Tsugumi; Voiced by: Ayahi Takagaki)
- Haruko Yumesaki (夢前 春瑚, Yumesaki Haruko; Voiced by: Ai Kayano)
- Momoko Asahina (朝比奈 桃子, Asahina Momoko; Voiced by: Yui Ogura)
- Kinoko Himejima (姫島 木乃子, Himejima Kinoko; Voiced by: Kaori Mizuhashi)
- Haruka Kazemachi (風町 陽歌, Kazemachi Haruka; Voiced by: Saori Hayami): A second-year student belonging to the Light Music Club. She is the vocalist of the all-girls' band called "Neuron★Cream Soft", although she is also seen playing a guitar or composing music.
- Kyoko Tachibana (橘響子, Tachibana Kyoko; Voiced by: Ryoko Shintani): A Japanese teacher.
- Raimu Nejikawa (螺子川来夢, Nejikawa Raimu; Voiced by: Aki Toyosaki): A second-year student and a member of the Robots Research Club. Unlike other students, she wears a rainbow-colored blazer. She also sparks an interest in Monochrome for being an android.
- Tomo Oshii (押井知, Oshii Tomo; Voiced by: Saki Fujita): A second–year student in the broadcasting committee. However, she prefers to work mostly behind the scenes, unlike her other club members, which explains why she hardly does any kind of open broadcast.
- Akiho Shigetō (重藤秋穂, Shigeto Akiho; Voiced by: Megumi Toyoguchi)
- Ichigo Kohinata (小日向いちご, Kohinata Ichigo; Voiced by: Ayana Taketatsu): A first-year student belonging to the Art Club. Loves fruits so much that she draws them in her paintings, with a desire to taste every kind in the world except for Durian which she dislikes the most.
- Nae Yuki (優木苗, Yuki Nae; Voiced by: Rina Hidaka): A first-year student who is a member of the Handicrafts Club.
- Akari Amari (甘利燈, Amari Akari; Voiced by: Chinatsu Akasaki)
- Chizuru Onodera (小野寺千鶴, Onodera Chizuru; Voiced by: Yuko Gibu)
- Marika Saeki (佐伯鞠香, Saeki Marika; Voiced by: Kanae Ito)
- Yulia Valkova (ユーリヤ・ヴャルコワ, Varukova Yuria; Voiced by: Sumire Uesaka): A Russian exchange student.
- Michiru Tomura (戸村美知留, Tomura Michiru; Voiced by: Kana Asumi): A second-year student belonging to the Go Home Club.
- Risa Shinomiya (篠宮りさ, Shinomiya Risa; Voiced by: Yoko Hikasa)
- Nagiko Kurokawa (黒川凪子, Kurokawa Nagiko; Voiced by: Saori Goto): A second-year student belonging to the Light Music Club. She is the bassist of the all-girls' band "Neuron ★ Cream Soft."
- Kurumi Eto (江藤くるみ, Eto Kurumi; Voiced by: Aya Suzaki)
- Sumire Yomogida (蓬田菫, Yomogida Sumire; Voiced by: Hiromi Igarashi)
- Rei Shinonome (東雲レイ, Shinonome Rei; Voiced by: Eri Kitamura)
- Satoru Kimijima (君嶋里琉, Kimijima Satoru; Voiced by: Mutsumi Tamura)
- Miss Monochrome (ミス・モノクローム, Misu Monokurōmu; Voiced by: Yui Horie): An original character designed by Yui Horie herself.
- Rui Kamijo (上条るい, Kamijo Rui; Voiced by: Yui Watanabe)
- Kise Yukawa (湯川基世, Yukawa Kise; Voiced by: Hisako Kanemoto)
- Yuzuki Kiriyama (桐山優月, Kiriyama Yuzuki; Voiced by: Mai Kadowaki)
- Hina Nigaki (新垣雛菜, Nigaki Hina; Voiced by: Madoka Yonezawa)
- Kazuha Kumada (熊田一葉, Kumada Kazuha; Voiced by: Ayane Sakura)
- Nozomi Miyauchi (宮内希, Miyauchi Nozomi; Voiced by: Ryo Hirohashi): A member of the Movie Study Group. She wears a green scarf around her neck in a similar manner to the Kamen Rider and likes tokusatsu films.
- Otome Kayashima (栢嶋乙女, Kayashima Otome; Voiced by: Yumi Uchiyama)
- Yukie Yatsuka (八束由紀恵, Yatsuka Yukie; Voiced by: Asami Imai)

== Related media ==
=== Print media ===
A manga adaptation illustrated by Tsukako Akina titled Girl Friend (Kari): Shiina Kokomi-hen ~Koishite Madonna~ (ガールフレンド(仮) 椎名心実編 ～恋してマドンナ～, Girl Friend Beta: Kokomi Shiina Stories ~Fall in Love Madonna~) began serialization in the September 2014 issue of ASCII Media Works's Dengeki Maoh magazine, released on July 26, 2014.

The first issue of the official Girl Friend Beta Magazine was released by ASCII Media Works on August 22, 2014, and four different manga series that cover specific characters began serialization in that issue. The first manga is illustrated by Takahiro Seguchi and is titled Girl Friend (Kari): Murakami Fumio-hen ~Secret Smile~ (ガールフレンド（仮）村上文緒編 ～Secret Smile～). The second manga is illustrated by Sawayoshi Azuma and is titled Girl Friend (Kari): Chloe Lemarie-hen ~Chole to Nihon to Mirai no Tobira~ (ガールフレンド（仮）クロエ・ルメール編 ～クロエと日本と未来のトビラ～). The third manga is illustrated by Kakao and is titled Girl Friend (Kari): Sakurai Akane-hen ~Kokoro o Komete, Yūki no On Air!~ (ガールフレンド（仮）櫻井明音編 ～心を込めて、勇気のOn Air!～). The fourth manga is illustrated by Na! and is titled Girl Friend (Kari) ~Seiō Gakuen Girl's Diary~ (があるふれんど（かり）～聖櫻学園 girl's diary～).

=== Anime ===
An anime television series based on the original smartphone game was announced in June 2014, with an official announcement press conference taking place at the Akihabara UDX Theater. Produced by Silver Link, the series was directed by Naotaka Hayashi, with anime character designs by Noriko Tsutsumitani based on the original designs by QP:flapper, and story written by Michiko Yokote. The series began airing in Japan on TX Network (TV Tokyo) from October 13 to December 29, 2014. It was simulcasted by Crunchyroll. The opening theme is "Tanoshiki Tokimeki" (楽しきトキメキ) by Neuron★Creamsoft (main vocalist Haruka Kazemachi (voiced by Saori Hayami)), and the ending theme is "Hareru kana" (はれるかなぁ) by Satomi Satō as Kokomi Shiina.

An original net animation adaptation of Girl Friend Note, produced by Encourage Films, was released from October 14 to 21, 2016.

| No. | Title | Original release date |
|---|---|---|
| 1 | "Our First Promise"; Transliteration: "Hajimete no Yakusoku" (Japanese: はじめての約束) | October 13, 2014 |
Kokomi Shiina searches all over school for exchange student Chloe Lemaire after she drops a photo of her family.
| 2 | "Blue Melon Buns"; Transliteration: "Burū Meron Pan" (Japanese: ブルー・メロンパン) | October 20, 2014 |
While preparing for a rhythmic gymnastics tournament, Kokomi becomes concerned about her weight and decides to go on a diet, receiving help from her fellow students.
| 3 | "Cameras and Shortcake"; Transliteration: "Kamera to Shōtokēki" (Japanese: カメラとショートケーキ) | October 27, 2014 |
Kokomi is curious about Erena and Fumio, so Erena narrates the story about how she and Fumio met.
| 4 | "Cats and a Rainy Night"; Transliteration: "Neko to Ame no Yoru" (Japanese: 猫と雨の夜) | November 3, 2014 |
After a group of abandoned kittens are found, a group of potential owners must first increase their grades in order to keep them.
| 5 | "Darjeeling with Everyone"; Transliteration: "Dājirin o Minna to" (Japanese: ダージリンをみんなと) | November 10, 2014 |
When the cafeteria staff end up stranded on vacation due to weather, the student council steps in to run the cafeteria.
| 6 | "Sweet Bitter Potato"; Transliteration: "Suīto Bitā Poteto" (Japanese: スイート・ビター・ポテト) | November 17, 2014 |
| 7 | "Doggy and Scramble"; Transliteration: "Dogī & Sukuranburu" (Japanese: ドギー&スクランブル) | November 24, 2014 |
| 8 | "On the Other Side of the Cream Soda"; Transliteration: "Kurīmu Sōda no Mukō" (Japanese: クリームソーダの向こう) | December 1, 2014 |
| 9 | "Evolutionary Girl"; Transliteration: "Shinkakei Gāru" (Japanese: 進化系Girl) | December 8, 2014 |
| 10 | "Princess & Pride"; Transliteration: "Purinsesu & Puraido" (Japanese: プリンセス&プライド) | December 15, 2014 |
| 11 | "Goodbye à la Mode"; Transliteration: "Sayonara a·ra·Mōdo" (Japanese: さよならア・ラ・モード) | December 22, 2014 |
Chloe felt depressed after her father decided to get her back to France during the New Year. Chloe's friends help her, and in the end, it was revealed that the whole thing was from a huge misunderstanding about the New Year's Eve culture in Japan, partly due to Chloe still had a long way to learn, therefore allowing Chloe to stay in Japan.
| 12 | "Girlfriend xxx" Transliteration: "Gārufurendo xxx" (Japanese: ガールフレンド xxx) | December 29, 2014 |
Kokomi Shiina, Fumio, and Akane show Chloe Lemaire and Yulia how the Japanese celebrate New Year's. They participate in traditional Japanese activities, wear kimono, and count down until the New Year.

=== Other ===
Girl Friend Beta: Summer Vacation Spent With You (ガールフレンド（仮） きみと過ごす夏休み, Girl Friend (Kari): Kimi to Sugosu Natsuyasumi) is a spin-off adventure visual novel game developed by CyberAgent and published by Bandai Namco Games for the PlayStation Vita, released on November 19, 2015. The game involves the player romantically interacting with eight different characters from the original smartphone game. Game features include Live2D character movements, binaural voices, touchscreen events and microphone voice communication, and involves an original story.

An Internet radio show began broadcasting weekly from October 8, 2013 onwards, hosted by voice actors involved in the game. A similar smartphone game targeted at females, titled Boy Friend Beta (ボーイフレンド（仮）), was released by the same developers.

Girl Friend Note (ガールフレンド（♪）, Girl Friend (Onpu)) is a spin-off rhythm game developed by R-Force Entertainment and published by CyberAgent for Android and iOS. Released on December 1, 2015, the game underwent a two-week long maintenance due to unforeseen complications regarding various game systems. Maintenance ended on December 16, 2015 for Android and December 17, 2015 for iOS. It got a web anime adaptation in October 2016.

In July 2018, a stageshow will be held in Shinagawa Prince Hotel and the main cast is portrayed by the idol group =Love (イコールラブ, Ikō Rabu), with an original character named Tomoe Ichinose (一ノ瀬 友恵, Ichinose Tomoe).

== Reception ==
There are over 5.3 million users of the smartphone game as of June 2014. Virtual currency expenditures within March 2014 were valued at 1.8 billion yen, accounting for over 40% of Ameba's entire smartphone division earnings.

During the New Year celebratory period in early 2014, a promotional commercial for the game featured a handful of character introductions, including the character Chloe Lemaire (クロエ・ルメール); her self-introduction became an Internet meme on Niconico due to her awkward-sounding speech. More than 100 parody remixes of the original video were created on Niconico, with some reaching over 660,000 hits within the few days following the initial release.
