= Z/X =

Japanese media franchise

- Cover of Z/X Zillions of enemy X volume 1 by Shueisha
- Manga

Z/X Zillions of enemy X
- Written by: Broccoli
- Illustrated by: Karegashi Tsuchiya
- Published by: Shueisha
- Magazine: V Jump
- Original run: September 2012 – October 2016
- Volumes: 6
- Video game

Z/X Zillions of enemy X: Zekkai no Crusade
- Developer: Broccoli
- Publisher: Nippon Ichi Software
- Genre: Collectible card game
- Platform: PlayStation 3
- Released: JP: May 23, 2013
- Anime television series

Z/X Ignition
- Directed by: Yūji Yamaguchi
- Written by: Kurasumi Sunayama
- Music by: Yasuharu Takanashi
- Studio: Telecom Animation Film
- Licensed by: NA: Discotek Media
- Original network: TXN (TV Tokyo), AT-X
- Original run: January 9, 2014 – March 27, 2014
- Episodes: 12
- Manga

Z/X Code reunion
- Written by: Tatsuhiko Urahata
- Illustrated by: Takuya Fujima
- Published by: Shueisha
- Magazine: V Jump
- Original run: September 2017 – July 21, 2020
- Volumes: 2
- Anime television series

Z/X Code reunion
- Directed by: Yoshifumi Sueda
- Produced by: Masanobu Arakawa; Hiroshi Kawamura; Kazuhiro Saitou; Shunsuke Kubota
- Written by: Tatsuhiko Urahata
- Music by: Satoru Kuwabara
- Studio: Passione
- Licensed by: NA: Sentai Filmworks
- Original network: Tokyo MX, AT-X
- Original run: October 8, 2019 – December 24, 2019
- Episodes: 12

Z/X (ゼクス, Zekusu), also known as Z/X Zillions of enemy X, is a collectible card game produced by Nippon Ichi Software and Broccoli. It is marketed as the first "free" collectible card game, with a free deck offered to players at card shops and events in Japan. A PlayStation 3 game titled Z/X Zillions of enemy X: Zekkai no Crusade, developed by Nippon Ichi Software and produced by Broccoli was released in Japan on May 23, 2013. A manga adaptation written by Broccoli with art by Karegashi Tsuchiya began serialization in Shueisha's V Jump from September 2012. A 12-episode anime television series adaptation titled Z/X Ignition aired between January 9, 2014, and March 27, 2014.

A new anime series was announced in February 2015, which was later revealed to be an adaptation of a new manga series titled Z/X Code reunion. It is written by Tatsuhiko Urahata with art by Takuya Fujima, and it began serialization in V Jump from September 2017. The anime adaptation is produced by Passione and aired between October 8, 2019, and December 24, 2019. The anime is licensed in North America by Sentai Filmworks.

== Characters ==
=== Anime characters ===
Asuka Tennōji (天王寺 飛鳥, Tennōji Asuka)
Voiced by: Hiro Shimono
The main protagonist of Z/X: Ignition. He is kind and helpful, and lives in the dorm of his school. He captures the wounded angel Fierte with his card device which he got from a shrine priestess.
Ayase Kamiyugi (上柚木 綾瀬, Kamiyugi Ayase)
Voiced by: Miyuki Sawashiro
Ayase is from the Black World and is half-Japanese and half-German. Her parents were brutally murdered by White World's angels so she decided to help the Black World out of revenge.
Azumi Kagamihara (各務原 あづみ, Kagamihara Azumi)
Voiced by: Yui Ogura
The main protagonist of Z/X: Code Reunion. Azumi is from the Blue World. She was on the verge of death due to an unknown disease but her life was extended with the help of the Blue World's technology. In exchange, she has to fight together with others against the other worlds. She is a shy character but she has a very strong will to live, especially since she already came so close to death before. Her Z/X is Rigel.
Mikado Kurosaki (黒崎 神門, Kurosaki Mikado)
Voiced by: Yuichi Nakamura
Alexander's strategist, from the Red World. He protects Sera because she reminds him of his younger sister.
Chitose Aoba (青葉 千歳, Aoba Chitose)
Voiced by: Maaya Uchida
Chitose is from the Green World and was a former member of the Self-Defence Force. She has a soft-hearted nature even towards the monsters who are supposed to be her enemies.
Sera Kurashiki (倉敷 世羅, Kurashiki Sera)
Voiced by: Hisako Kanemoto
Sera is from the Red World, she lost her mother who was a reporter by the Z/X but she believes she's still alive and wants to find her. Her Z/X is Orichalcum Tyranno.
Misaki Yuzuriha (弓弦羽 ミサキ, Yuzuriha Misaki)
Voiced by: Kaori Ishihara

Misaki is one of the main protagonists in Z/X -Zillions of enemy X-.

Aina Mikage (御影 藍那, Mikage Aina)
Voiced by: Yurika Endō
Asuka's classmate, she also lost her parents to the Z/X and has an unconscious hatred towards them. This hatred was the reason why the Z/X Audium manipulated her.
Fierte (フィエリテ, Fierite)
Voiced by: M・A・O
An Angel who was wounded by Ayase. Asuka protected her from Angel killer Ayase and later captured by Asuka.
Sieger (ズィーガー, Zīgā)
Voiced by: Kazuhiko Inoue
Ayase's Z/X. A giant flying Panther from the Black World. He is brutal and bloodthirsty. Tries to peep Ayase from time to time.
Rigel (リゲル, Rigeru)
Voiced by: Aya Uchida
Azumi's Z/X, a Sword Sniper from the Blue World. She wishes to save Azumi at all costs, even going against the will of her world.
Alexander (アレキサンダー, Arekizanda)
Voiced by: Nobuyuki Hiyama
One of the nine worthies. Alexander is trying to conquer the world with his strategist Mikado.
Rindou (龍膽, Rindō)
Voiced by: Shintaro Asanuma
A Samurai from the Green World and Chitose's Z/X.
Dragon's Priestess (竜の巫女, Ryu no Miko)
Voiced by: Houko Kuwashima
Gambiel (ガムビエル, Gamubieru)
Voiced by: Satomi Satō
One on the Twelve Apostles from the White World, she is the Angel who ordered the murder of every person in Ayase's village, for the only reason of covering the fact that an Angel accidentally killed someone.
Quon (Cait Sith) (クゥン〈ケット・シー〉, Kuon (Ketto Shi))
Voiced by: Rie Murakawa
Gambiel's helper.
Michael (ミカエル, Mikaeru)
Voiced by: Yoko Hikasa
One of the archangels from White World heaven.
Gabriel (ガブリエル, Gaburieru)
Voiced by: Jurota Kosugi
Another one of the archangels from White World heaven, his servant killed few of heaven's soldiers who saw Fierte on earth to restrain them from telling to Michael that they saw her.
Sir Garmata (サー・ガルマータ, Saa Garumata)
Voiced by: Junji Majima
He is one of the Guardians of the White World. He opposed Gambiel in her plan of murdering the innocent people of Ayase's village from the beginning and defied his orders by rescuing Ayase from his own kind. He is Misaki's Z/X.
Ena Soranokawa (天ノ川衣奈, Soranokawa Era)
Voiced by: Inori Minase
Shuri Kijino (鬼神野シュリ, Kijino Shuri)
Voiced by: Aina Suzuki
Matoi Shinonome (東雲纏, Shinonome Matoi)
Voiced by: Maria Naganawa
Yuni Tsukigata (月形由仁, Tsukigata Yuni)
Voiced by: Miyu Tomita
Ira (イラ)
Voiced by: Momoko Soyama
Nephrite (ネフライト)
Voiced by: Yusuke Shirai
Muramasa (ムラマサ)
Voiced by: Megumi Yamaguchi
Zonne (ゾンネ)
Voiced by: Mio Hoshitani
Amrita (アムリタ)
Voiced by: Nana Harumura

=== Other characters ===
Reia Sento (戦斗 怜亜, Sento Reia)
Voiced by: Sumire Uesaka
Yamato Tennōji (天王寺 大和, Tennōji Yamato)
Voiced by: Kishō Taniyama
Sōma Kenbuchi (剣淵 相馬, Kenbuchi Sōma)
Voiced by: Yoshimasa Hosoya

=== Video game characters ===
Kaede Kaga (加賀 楓, Kaga Kaede)
Voiced by: Yoshitsugu Matsuoka
Cecile Royale (セシル・ロワイヤル, Seshiru Rowaiyaru)
Voiced by: Shizuka Ito
Steve Shibaya (スティーブ・シバヤ, Stiipu Shibaya)
Voiced by: Anri Katsu
Natalia Cambiasso (ナタリア・カンビアッソ, Nataria Kanbiaaso)
Voiced by: Ayumi Fujimura
Quinn Forsythe (クイン・フォーサイス, Kuin Fosaizu)
Voiced by: Takuo Kawamura
Skull Vicious (スカルヴィシャス, Sukaru Bishasu)
Voiced by: Keichiiro Satomi
Mouflon (ムフロン, Mufuron)
Voiced by: Motoki Takagi
Isis (イシス, Ishisu)
Voiced by: Masami Katou
Lhotse (ローツェ, Rotse)
Voiced by: Ryoko Nakata
Shaula (シャウラ, Shaura)
Voiced by: Miyuki Sano
Chloe (クロエ, Kuroe)
Voiced by: Hitomi
Samejima (鮫島, Samejima)
Voiced by: Shizuka Arai
Jose (ホセ, Hose)
Voiced by: Kazuya Ichijo

== Media ==
=== Manga ===
| No. | Title | Release date | ISBN |
|---|---|---|---|
| 1 | Z/X 01 (Z / X 第1) | July 4, 2013 | 978-4-08-870779-2 |
| 2 | Z/X 02 (Z / X 第2) | February 4, 2014 | 978-4-08-880019-6 |
| 3 | Z/X 03 (Z / X 第3) | November 4, 2014 | 978-4-08-880183-4 |
| 4 | Z/X 04 (Z / X 第4) | July 3, 2015 | 978-4-08-880433-0 |
| 5 | Z/X 05 (Z / X 第5) | May 2, 2016 | 978-4-08-880679-2 |
| 6 | Z/X 06 (Z / X 第6) | December 31, 2016 | 978-4-08-880893-2 |

=== Anime ===
A 12-episode anime television series adaptation titled Z/X Ignition aired between January 9, 2014, and March 27, 2014.

A new anime adaptation was announced in February 2015. It was later revealed at the Z/Xtreme 2017 Autumn event on September 17, 2017, to be an adaptation of a new manga series titled Z/X Code reunion. It is animated by Passione and aired between October 8, 2019, and December 24, 2019.

| No. | Title (Note: All English titles are taken from Hidive.) | Original release date |
|---|---|---|
| 1 | "Blossom Adorned Campus"; Transliteration: "Sakuramau Gakuen e" (Japanese: 桜舞う学園へ) | October 8, 2019 |
| 2 | "Drive Shaft Ignition!"; Transliteration: "Doraibu Shafuto Igunisshon !" (Japanese: ドライブシャフト起動！) | October 15, 2019 |
| 3 | "Branded E"; Transliteration: "E no Rakuin" (Japanese: Eの烙印) | October 22, 2019 |
| 4 | "The Guardian and the Guarded"; Transliteration: "Mamoru Mono Mamorareru Mono" (Japanese: 守る者 守られる者) | October 29, 2019 |
| 5 | "Overboost"; Transliteration: "Ōbābūsuto" (Japanese: オーバーブースト) | November 5, 2019 |
| 6 | "Slacker Z/X"; Transliteration: "Hatarakanai Zekusu" (Japanese: はたらかないゼクス) | November 12, 2019 |
| 7 | "Vow to the Blue Skies"; Transliteration: "Aozora e no Chikai" (Japanese: 青空への誓い) | November 19, 2019 |
| 8 | "Summer Vacation!"; Transliteration: "Natsu Yasumi!" (Japanese: なつやすみっ!) | November 26, 2019 |
| 9 | "Never Say Goodbye?"; Transliteration: "Sayonara wa Iwanai yo?" (Japanese: さよならは言わないよ？) | December 3, 2019 |
| 10 | "Inerma & Dunamis"; Transliteration: "Ineruma to Dyunamisu" (Japanese: 異存在と神域) | December 10, 2019 |
| 11 | "Fabricated Life"; Transliteration: "Itsuwari no Inochi" (Japanese: イツワリノイノチ) | December 17, 2019 |
| 12 | "Code Reunion"; Transliteration: "Kōdo Riyunion" (Japanese: コードリユニオン) | December 24, 2019 |

=== Video games ===
A PlayStation 3 game titled Z/X Zekkai no Crusade (Z/X 絶界の聖戦) published by Nippon Ichi Software was released on May 23, 2013; a PlayStation Vita version was also announced but ultimately canceled. A mobile game titled Z/X Code OverBoost was released on iOS and Android devices on October 8, 2019, and will end service on July 20, 2020.
