= Maho Matsunaga =

Japanese voice actress and singer

- 松永 真穂
- Born: January 23, 1993 (age 33); Tokyo, Japan
- Occupations: Voice actress; singer
- Years active: 2010–2016

Maho Matsunaga (松永 真穂, Matsunaga Maho; born January 23, 1993) is a former Japanese voice actress and singer from Tokyo. She was a member of the pop idol unit StylipS. She is currently retired from her voice acting career and graduated from StylipS in May 2016.

== Filmography ==
Bold denotes leading roles.

=== Anime ===
- Hanamaru Kindergarten (2010) as Yuna
- High School DxD as Li
- Kono Naka ni Hitori, Imōto ga Iru! (2012) as Kurumi Kashinoki
- Saki Achiga-hen episode of Side-A (2012) as Izumi Nijō
- Love Live! School Idol Project - Erena Toudou (2013)
- Love Live! School Idol Project 2nd Season - Erena Toudou (2014)
- Love Live! The School Idol Movie - Erena Toudou (2015)
