= Sorcery Saga: Curse of the Great Curry God =

2013 video game

- North American boxart
- Developers: Compile Heart; ZeroDiv
- Publishers: JP: Compile Heart; NA: Aksys Games; EU: Rising Star Games; WW: Ghostlight; Microsoft Windows: WW: Ghostlight
- Series: Madou Monogatari
- Platforms: PlayStation Vita; Microsoft Windows
- Release: PlayStation Vita: JP: 28 March 2013; NA: 10 December 2013; EU: 21 February 2014; Microsoft Windows: WW: 4 June 2018
- Genre: Role-playing

Sorcery Saga: Curse of the Great Curry God (Note: Known in Japan as Sei Madou Monogatari (聖魔導物語, Sei Madō Monogatari; Story of Holy Sorcery).) is a video game developed by Compile Heart for the PlayStation Vita. It is based on the original Madou Monogatari released in 1989. The game was released on 28 March 2013 in Japan, 10 December in North America via Aksys Games, and on 21 February 2014 in Europe via Rising Star Games. A Microsoft Windows version, produced and published by Ghostlight, was released on 4 June 2018.

== Gameplay ==
Sorcery Saga: Curse of the Great Curry God is a dungeon crawler video game set in a large world with a number of diverse dungeons. The dungeons are automatically and randomly generated. The game also features various cities, which have various events. Gamers who pre-ordered the game could obtain a "bikini download code". Aksys released the game as a standalone game, in addition to a limited edition package titled "Hot and Spicy, Everything Nicey Limited Edition". The Limited Edition copy sold in North America includes a specially designed bib, plastic spoon and plate.

== Reception ==
Reception

Aggregate scores
Aggregator	Score
GameRankings	69.20%
Metacritic	65/100

Review scores
Publication	Score
Destructoid	6/10
IGN	7.5/10
Polygon	5/10
Hardcore Gamer	4/5
USGamer	4/5

Bradly Hale of Hardcore Gamer gave the game a 4/5, calling it "without a doubt one of the most traditional roguelikes to come out in a while". Wesley Ruscher of Destructoid awarded Sorcery Saga a 6/10, summarising it as "a title that took me by surprise. It may not the best of games, but it's far from the worst. Its lighthearted nature is hard to recommend if you're not a fan of the genre, but if you're willing to try something a little different, there's enough delicious pleasantries served throughout to satisfy anyone's dungeon-crawling cravings".

IGN's Meghan Sullivan rated the game 7.5/10, stating that "although Sorcery Saga's roguelike elements and minor glitches made me feel incredibly frustrated at times, I still enjoyed the story and characters enough to power through its multileveled dungeons just to see what happened once the credits rolled. If you're looking to expand your gaming palette, Sorcery Saga is a tasty little morsel for the Vita that offers both plenty of challenges and lots of laughs" and that "if you've never played a roguelike RPG, Sorcery Saga is a nice, bite-sized entry point into the genre".

Danielle Riendeau of Polygon was more critical of the game, criticising the "tedious mechanics, arbitrary deaths and disturbing, off-putting writing", and said that "Sorcery Saga: Curse of the Great Curry God treated me like a bad pet, whacking my nose with a newspaper without ever showing me what I did wrong. I like difficult games, but it was impossible to feel like I was progressing", scoring Sorcery Saga 5/10. US Gamer's Cassandra Khaw gave Sorcery Saga a positive review, claiming "Sorcery Saga: Curse of the Great Curry God is excellent albeit not terribly inspired. It keeps to traditional motifs, eschewing more grandiose ideas in favour of a more familiar flavor" and rewarding it four stars out of five.
