= 2017 in anime =

Events in 2017 in anime. This year is known as the Anime Centennial Year, and was celebrated as its 100th anniversary to commemorate the ending of the Heisei era.

== Awards ==
- 1st Crunchyroll Anime Awards
- 11th Seiyu Awards

== Releases ==
=== Films ===
A list of anime that debuted in theaters between 1 January and 31 December 2017.

Release date	Title	Studio	Director	Running time (minutes)	Notes	Ref
6 January	Kizumonogatari III: Reiketsu-hen	Shaft	Akiyuki Shinbo; Tatsuya Oishi	83		
7 January	Kabaneri of the Iron Fortress - Part 2: Burning Life	Wit Studio	Tetsurō Araki	104		
21 January	Black Butler: Book of the Atlantic	A-1 Pictures	Noriyuki Abe	100		
3 February	Genocidal Organ	Manglobe	Shukō Murase	114		
11 February	Ao Oni: The Animation	Studio Deen	Toshirō Hamamura	60		
18 February	Sword Art Online The Movie: Ordinal Scale	A-1 Pictures	Tomohiko Itō	120		
25 February	Digimon Adventure tri. Loss	Toei Animation	Keitaro Motonaga	78		
4 March	Doraemon the Movie 2017: Great Adventure in the Antarctic Kachi Kochi	Shin-Ei Animation	Atsushi Takahashi	101		
10 March	Shimajirō to Niji no Oashisu	Benesse Corporation	Isamu Hirabayashi	54		
18 March	Kuroko's Basketball The Movie: Last Game	Production I.G	Shunsuke Tada	90		
7 April	The Night Is Short, Walk On Girl	Science Saru	Masaaki Yuasa	93		
15 April	Crayon Shin-chan: Invasion!! Alien Shiriri	TMS Entertainment	Masakazu Hashimoto	103		
15 April	Detective Conan: Crimson Love Letter	TMS Entertainment	Kobun Shizuno	112		
6 May	Fairy Tail: Dragon Cry	A-1 Pictures	Shōji Yonemura	85		
19 May	Lu over the Wall	Science Saru	Masaaki Yuasa	112		
17 June	The Irregular at Magic High School: The Movie – The Girl Who Summons the Stars	Eight Bit	Risako Yoshida	90		
15 July	No Game No Life: Zero	Kadokawa Animation	Atsuko Ishizuka	105		
15 July	Pokémon the Movie: I Choose You!	OLM	Kunihiko Yuyama	97		
18 August	Fireworks, Should We See It from the Side or the Bottom?	Shaft	Akiyuki Shinbo; Nobuyuki Takeuchi	90		
26 August	Fate/kaleid liner Prisma Illya: Vow in the Snow	Silver Link	Shin Ōnuma	90		
30 September	Digimon Adventure tri. Coexistence	Toei Animation	Keitaro Motonaga	85		
14 October	Fate/stay night: Heaven's Feel I. presage flower	Ufotable	Tomonori Sudō	120		
11 November	Gekijōban Haikara-san ga Tōru Zenpen - Benio, Hana no 17-sai	Nippon Animation	Kazuhiro Furuhashi	97		
17 November	Godzilla: Planet of the Monsters	Polygon Pictures	Kōbun Shizuno	88		
9 December	Girls und Panzer das Finale: Part 1	Actas	Tsutomu Mizushima	47		

=== Television series ===
A list of anime television series that debuted between 1 January and 31 December 2017.

First run start and end dates	Title	Episodes	Studio	Director	Original title	Ref
3 January – 21 March	Ai Mai Mi Surgical Friends	12	Seven	Itsuki Imazaki		
4 January – 29 March	Akiba's Trip: The Animation	13	Gonzo	Hiroshi Ikehata		
5 January – 23 March	Masamune-kun's Revenge	12	Silver Link	Mirai Minato	Masamune-kun no Revenge	
5 January – 23 March	Seiren	12	Studio Gokumi; AXsiZ	Tomoki Kobayashi		
5 January – 23 March	Urara Meirocho	12	J.C.Staff	Youhei Suzuki		
6 January – 24 March	Fuuka	12	Diomedéa	Keizō Kusakawa		
6 January – 15 May	Minami Kamakura High School Girls Cycling Club	13	J.C.Staff; A.C.G.T	Susumu Kudo	Minami Kamakura Kōkō Joshi Jitensha-Bu	
6 January – 31 March	Saga of Tanya the Evil	12	NUT	Yutaka Uemura	Yōjo Senki	
7 January – 25 March	Blue Exorcist: Kyoto Saga	12	A-1 Pictures	Koichi Hatsumi	Ao no Exorcist: Kyoto Fujouou-hen	
7 January – 26 March	Interviews with Monster Girls	12	A-1 Pictures	Ryou Andou	Demi-chan wa Kataritai	
8 January – 25 March	Chain Chronicle	12	Telecom Animation Film; Graphinica	Masashi Kudō		
8 January – 26 March	ēlDLIVE	12	Pierrot	Takeshi Furuta; Tomoya Tanaka		
8 January – 27 March	Idol Incidents	12	MAPPA; Studio VOLN	Daisuke Yoshida	Idol Jihen	
8 January – 26 March	Nyanko Days	12	EMT Squared	Yoshimasa Hiraike		
8 January – 29 April	Tales of Zestiria the X (season 2)	13	Ufotable	Haruo Sotozaki		
9 January – 26 June	Little Witch Academia	25	Trigger	Yoh Yoshinari		
9 January – 27 March	Gabriel DropOut	12	Doga Kobo	Masahiko Ohta		
10 January – 28 March	ACCA: 13-Territory Inspection Dept.	12	Madhouse	Shingo Natsume		
10 January – 28 March	Hand Shakers	12	GoHands	Shingo Suzuki; Hiromichi Kanazawa		
10 January – 28 March	Kemono Friends	12	Yaoyorozu	Tatsuki		
10 January – 26 June	Yowamushi Pedal: New Generation	25	TMS/8PAN	Osamu Nabeshima		
11 January – 29 March	Chaos;Child	12	Silver Link	Masato Jinbo		
11 January – 29 March	One Room	12	Typhoon Graphics			
11 January – 29 March	Piacevole!	12	Zero-G	Hiroaki Sakurai		
11 January – 1 April	Schoolgirl Strikers	13	J.C.Staff	Hiroshi Nishikiori		
12 January – April 6	Miss Kobayashi's Dragon Maid	13	Kyoto Animation	Yasuhiro Takato	Kobayashi-san Chi no Maid Dragon	
12 January – 30 March	Scum's Wish	12	Lerche	Masaomi Ando	Kuzu no Honkai	
21 January – 22 April	BanG Dream!	13	Issen; Xebec	Atsushi Ootsuki		
5 February – 28 January 2018	Kirakira PreCure a la Mode	49	Toei Animation	Kohei Kureta; Yukio Kaizawa		
18 February – 25 February	Dragon Dentist	2				
1 April – 17 June	Attack on Titan (season 2)	12	Wit Studio; Production I.G	Tetsurō Araki; Masashi Koizuka	Shingeki no Kyojin	
1 April –	Future Card Buddyfight X		OLM, Inc. Xebec			
1 April – 30 September	My Hero Academia (season 2)	25	Bones	Kenji Nagasaki	Boku no Hero Academia	
1 April –	The Silver Guardian		Haoliners Animation League	Masahiko Ohkura	Gin no Guardian	
2 April – 25 June	Alice & Zouroku	12	J.C.Staff	Katsushi Sakurabi		
2 April – 25 June	Granblue Fantasy The Animation	12	A-1 Pictures	Ayako Kurata; Yuuki Itoh		
3 April – 26 March 2018	Beyblade Burst Evolution	51	OLM	Katsuhito Akiyama		
3 April – 19 June	Frame Arms Girl	12	Zexcs; Studio A-Cat	Keiichiro Kawaguchi		
3 April – 19 June	The Laughing Salesman NEW	12	Shin-Ei Animation	Hirofumi Ogura		
3 April – 19 June	Tsugumomo	12	Zero-G	Ryōichi Kuraya		
4 April – 20 June	Akashic Records of Bastard Magic Instructor	12	Liden Films	Minato Kazuto		
4 April – 27 March 2018	Idol Time PriPara	51	Tatsunoko Production; DongWoo A&E	Makoto Moriwaki		
4 April – 20 June	The Royal Tutor	12	Bridge	Katsuya Kikuchi	Ōshitsu Kyōshi Haine	
5 April – 21 June	Armed Girl's Machiavellism	12	Silver Link	Hideki Tachibana	Busō Shōjo Machiavellism	
5 April – 26 March 2023	Boruto: Naruto Next Generations		Pierrot	Noriyuki Abe; Hiroyuki Yamashita		
5 April – 13 September	Sagrada Reset	24	David Production	Shinya Kawatsura	Sakurada Reset	
5 April – 20 September	Sakura Quest	25	P.A. Works	Soichi Masui		
6 April – 22 June	Clockwork Planet	12	Xebec	Tsuyoshi Nagasawa		
6 April – 22 June	Kabukibu!	12	Studio Deen	Kazuhiro Yoneda		
6 April – 22 June	Love Tyrant	12	EMT Squared	Atsushi Nigorikawa	Ren'ai Bōkun	
6 April – 29 June	Tsuki ga Kirei	12	Feel	Seiji Kishi		
7 April – 23 June	Hinako Note	12	Passione	Takeo Takahashi; Toru Kitahata		
7 April – 30 June	Kado: The Right Answer	12	Toei Animation	Kazuya Murata	Seikai Suru Kado	
7 April – 29 September	Rage of Bahamut: Virgin Soul (season 2)	24	MAPPA	Keiichi Sato	Shingeki no Bahamut: Virgin Soul	
7 April – 30 March 2018	Rilu Rilu Fairilu: Maho no Kagami	51	Studio Deen	Nana Imanaka; Sakura Gojo		
7 April – 23 June	Twin Angel Break	12	J.C.Staff	Yoshiaki Iwasaki		
8 April – 24 June	Eromanga Sensei	12	A-1 Pictures	Ryohei Takeshita		
8 April – 16 September	Re:Creators	22	Troyca	Ei Aoki		
9 April – 25 June	ID-0	12	Sanzigen	Gorō Taniguchi		
9 April – 25 June	The Eccentric Family (season 2)	12	P.A. Works	Masayuki Yoshihara	Uchōten Kazoku	
10 April – 26 June	Grimoire of Zero	12	White Fox	Tetsuo Hirakawa	Zero kara Hajimeru Mahō no Sho	
11 April – 27 June	Anonymous Noise	12	Brain's Base	Hideya Takahashi		
11 April – 27 June	WorldEnd	12	Satelight; C2C		Shūmatsu Nani Shitemasu ka? Isogashii Desu ka? Sukutte Moratte Ii Desu ka?	
12 April – 28 June	Kenka Bancho Otome: Girl Beats Boys	12	A-Real; Project No.9	Noriaki Saito		
12 April – 28 June	Room Mate	12	Typhoon Graphics			
13 April – 28 September	Gamers!	12	Pine Jam	Manabu Okamoto		
14 April – 23 June	Saekano: How to Raise a Boring Girlfriend Flat	11	A-1 Pictures	Kanta Kamei	Saenai Heroine no Sodatekata Flat	
14 April – 30 June	Is It Wrong to Try to Pick Up Girls in a Dungeon?: Sword Oratoria	12	J.C.Staff	Yōhei Suzuki	Dungeon ni Deai o Motomeru no wa Machigatteiru Darō ka Gaiden: Sword Oratoria	
14 April – 29 July	Seven Mortal Sins	12	Artland; TNK	Kinji Yoshimoto	sin Nanatsu no Taizai	
15 April – 16 December	100% Pascal-sensei	36	OLM	Yo Miura		
15 April – 8 July	Atom: The Beginning	12	OLM; Production I.G; Signal.MD	Katsuyuki Motohiro; Tatsuo Satō		
15 April – 16 December	PriPri Chi-chan!!	36	OLM, Inc.	Takahiro Ikezoe		
15 April – 23 December	Tomica Hyper Rescue Drive Head Kidō Kyūkyū Keisatsu	37	OLM; Xebec	Takao Kato		
10 May – 25 September 2019	Yu-Gi-Oh! VRAINS	120	Gallop	Masahiro Hosoda; Katsuya Asano		
1 July – 23 September	Hina Logi: From Luck & Logic	12	Doga Kobo	Hiroaki Akagi		
1 July – 23 September	Kakegurui – Compulsive Gambler	12	MAPPA	Yuichiro Hayashi		
1 July – 23 September	Katsugeki/Touken Ranbu	13	Ufotable	Toshiyuki Shirai		
1 July – 30 September	Senki Zesshō Symphogear AXZ	13	Satelight	Katsumi Ono		
2 July – 17 September	Battle Girl High School	12	Silver Link	Noriaki Akitaya		
2 July – 17 September	Clean Freak! Aoyama kun	12	Studio Hibari	Kazuya Ichikawa	Keppeki Danshi! Aoyama-kun	
2 July – 30 December	Fate/Apocrypha	25	A-1 Pictures	Yoshiyuki Asai		
2 July – 24 September	Knight's & Magic	13	8-Bit	Yusuke Yamamoto		
3 July – 25 December	Elegant Yokai Apartment Life	26	Shin-Ei Animation	Mitsuo Hashimoto	Yōkai Apāto no Yūga na Nichijō	
3 July – 18 September	Restaurant to Another World	12	Silver Link	Masato Jinbo	Isekai Shokudō	
4 July – 19 September	Aho-Girl	12	Diomedéa	Keizō Kusakawa; Shingo Tamaki		
4 July – 19 September	Love and Lies	12	Liden Films	Seiki Takuno	Koi to Uso	
4 July – 19 September	Nana Maru San Batsu	12	TMS Entertainment	Masaki Ōzora	7O3X; Fastest Finger First	
4 July – 19 September	Tsuredure Children	12	Studio Gokumi	Hiraku Kaneko		
5 July – 20 September	NTR: Netsuzou Trap	12	Creators in Pack	Hisayoshi Hirasawa		
5 July – 20 September	Saiyuki Reload Blast	12	Platinum Vision	Hideaki Nakano		
6 July – 28 September	Convenience Store Boy Friends	12	Pierrot	Hayato Date	Konbini Kareshi	
6 July – 21 September	Dive!!	12	Zero-G	Kaoru Suzuki		
7 July – 29 September	18if	13	Gonzo	Kōji Morimoto		
7 July – 29 September	Action Heroine Cheer Fruits	12	Diomedéa	Keizō Kusakawa		
7 July – 22 December	Altair: A Record of Battles	24	MAPPA	Kazuhiro Furuhashi	Shōkoku no Altair	
7 July – 29 September	Chronos Ruler	13	Project No.9	Masato Matsune		
7 July – 29 September	Made in Abyss	13	Kinema Citrus	Masayuki Kojima		
7 July – 22 September	Vatican Miracle Examiner	12	J.C.Staff	Yoshitomo Yonetani		
8 July – 23 September	Hitorijime My Hero	12	Encourage Films	Yukina Hiiro		
8 July – 17 December	Welcome to the Ballroom	24	Production I.G	Yoshimi Itazu	Ballroom e Yōkoso	
9 July – 24 September	A Centaur's Life	12	Haoliners Animation League	Fumitoshi Oizaki; Naoyuki Konno	Centaur no Nayami	
9 July – 24 September	Princess Principal	12	Studio 3Hz; Actas	Masaki Tachibana		
10 July – 25 September	Angel's 3Piece!	12	Project No.9	Shinsuke Yanagi	Tenshi no 3P!	
11 July – 26 September	In Another World With My Smartphone	12	Production Reed	Takeyuki Yanase	Isekai wa Smartphone to Tomo ni	
11 July – 19 December	Magical Circle Guru Guru	24	Production I.G	Hiroshi Ikehata	Mahōjin Guru Guru	
11 July – 26 September	New Game!!	12	Doga Kobo	Yoshiyuki Fujiwara		
11 July – 26 September	Musekinin Galaxy Tylor	12	Seven	Hiroshi Kimura		
12 July – 27 September	Classroom of the Elite	12	Lerche	Seiji Kishi; Hiroyuki Hashimoto	Yōkoso Jitsuryoku Shijō Shugi no Kyōshitsu e	
12 July – 27 September	Clione no Akari	12	Drop	Naoya Ishikawa		
12 July – 27 September	Teekyu (season 9)	12	Millepensee	Shin Itagaki		
12 July – 13 September	My First Girlfriend Is a Gal	10	NAZ	Hiroyuki Furukawa	Hajimete no Gal	
12 July – 27 September	Nora, Princess, and Stray Cat	12	DMM.futureworks; W-Toon Studio	Kenshirō Morii	Nora to Ōjo to Noraneko Heart	
14 July – 29 September	Hell Girl: The Fourth Twilight	12	Studio Deen	Takahiro Omori	Jigoku Shōjo: Yoi no Togi	
22 July – 7 October	The Reflection	12	Studio Deen	Hiroshi Nagahama		
2 October – 18 December	UQ Holder!	12	J.C.Staff	Youhei Suzuki		
3 October – 30 March 2021	Black Clover	170	Pierrot	Tatsuya Yoshihara		
3 October – 20 December	Food Wars!: Shokugeki no Soma (season 3)	12	J.C.Staff	Yoshitomo Yonetani		
3 October – 26 December	Infini-T Force	12	Tatsunoko; Digital Frontier	Kiyotaka Suzuki		
3 October – 19 December	Juni Taisen: Zodiac War	12	Graphinica	Naoto Hosoda		
3 October – 26 December	Osake wa Fūfu ni Natte kara	13	Creators in Pack	Hisayoshi Hirasawa; Saori Tachibana		
3 October – 26 December	Sengoku Night Blood	12	Typhoon Graphics	Katsuya Kikuchi		
4 October – 20 December	Konohana Kitan	12	Lerche	Hideki Okamoto		
4 October – 20 December	Urahara	12	EMT Squared	Amika Kubo		
5 October – 22 December	Dynamic Chord	12	Pierrot	Shigenori Kageyama		
5 October – 28 December	Just Because!	12	Pine Jam	Atsushi Kobayashi		
5 October – 21 December	King's Game The Animation	12	Seven	Noriyoshi Sasaki		
6 October – 22 December	Girls' Last Tour	12	White Fox	Takaharu Ozaki	Shōjo Shūmatsu Ryokō	
6 October – 22 December	Kino's Journey ~The Beautiful World~ The Animated Series	12	Lerche (studio)	Tomohisa Taguchi		
6 October – 8 December	Recovery of an MMO Junkie	10	Signal.MD	Kazuyoshi Yaginuma	Netojū no Susume	
6 October – 17 November	Yuki Yuna is a Hero: Washio Sumi Chapter	7	Studio Gokumi	Seiji Kishi; Daisei Fukuoka		
7 October – 23 December	Blood Blockade Battlefront & Beyond	12	Bones	Shigehito Takayanagi	Kekkai Sensen & Beyond	
7 October –	ClassicaLoid (season 2)		Sunrise	Yoichi Fujita		
7 October – 23 December	Code: Realize − Guardian of Rebirth	12	M.S.C	Hideyo Yamamoto		
7 October – 23 December	Dies Irae	18	A.C.G.T	Susumu Kudo		
7 October – 30 March 2018	Garo: Vanishing Line	24	MAPPA	Sunghoo Park		
7 October – 31 December	Hozuki's Coolheadedness (season 2)	13	Studio Deen	Kazuhiro Yoneda	Hōzuki no Reitetsu	
7 October – 23 December	Land of the Lustrous	12	Orange	Takahiko Kyōgoku	Hōseki no Kuni	
7 October – 30 December	Love Live! Sunshine!! (season 2)	13	Sunrise	Kazuo Sakai		
7 October – 30 March 2019	Pingu in the City	52		Naomi Iwata	Pingū in za Shiti	
7 October – 24 March 2018	The Ancient Magus' Bride	24	Wit Studio	Norihiro Naganuma	Mahō Tsukai no Yome	
7 October – 30 December	The Idolmaster SideM	13	A-1 Pictures	Miyuki Kuroki; Takahiro Harada		
7 October – 24 March 2018	Time Bokan: The Villains' Strike Back	24	Tatsunoko Productions	Takayuki Inagaki		
7 October – 23 December	Two Car	12	Silver Link	Masafumi Tamura		
8 October – 24 December	Anime-Gataris	12	Wao World	Kenshirō Morii		
8 October – 24 December	A Sister's All You Need	12	Silver Link	Shin Ōnuma	Imōto Sae Ireba Ii.	
8 October – 24 December	Blend S	12	A-1 Pictures	Ryōji Masuyama		
8 October –	Cardfight!! Vanguard G: Z		OLM, Inc.	Nobuhiro Kondo		
8 October – 24 December	Children of the Whales	12	J.C.Staff	Kyōhei Ishiguro	Kujira no Kora wa Sajō ni Utau	
8 October – 24 December	Himouto! Umaru-chan R (season 2)	12	Doga Kobo	Masahiko Ohta		
9 October – 7 January 2018	Wake Up, Girls! New Chapter	12	Millepensee	Shin Itagaki	Wake Up, Girls! Shin Shō	
12 October – 22 December	Inuyashiki	11	MAPPA	Keiichi Sato; Shuhei Yabuta		
12 October – 13 December	My Girlfriend is Shobitch	10	Diomedéa; Studio Blanc	Nobuyoshi Nagayama	Boku no Kanojo ga Majime Sugiru Shojo Bitch na Ken	
24 November – 5 January 2018	Yuki Yuna is a Hero: Hero Chapter	6	Studio Gokumi	Seiji Kishi; Daisei Fukuoka		

=== ONAs/OVAs ===
Release date	Title	Episodes	Studio	Director
12 January	Chōyū Sekai	20	Asahi Production	Hatsuki Tsuji
12 April	Augmented Reality Girls Trinary	34	Feel	Keiichiro Kawaguchi

== Highest-grossing films ==
The following are the 10 highest-grossing anime films of 2017.

Rank	Title	Gross	Ref.
1	Detective Conan: Crimson Love Letter	$65,807,130	
2	Doraemon the Movie 2017: Great Adventure in the Antarctic Kachi Kochi	$63,796,378	(Note: Doraemon the Movie 2017 box office: Japan – ¥4.43 billion ($40,364,465); China – CN¥149 million ($22,045,333); South Korea & Turkey – $1,117,335; Hong Kong – HK$8.16 million (US$1,047,067); Italy – $92,755)
3	Mary and the Witch's Flower	$41,978,431	
4	Pokémon the Movie: I Choose You!	$37,552,407	
5	Sword Art Online The Movie: Ordinal Scale	$29,322,339	(Note: By October 1, 2017, Sword Art Online The Movie had grossed a total of over ¥4.3 billion worldwide. After October 5, 2017, the film grossed a further $41,652 in China, and $14,702 in Argentina.)
6	Fireworks, Should We See It from the Side or the Bottom?	$26,630,702	(Note: Fireworks had grossed $26 million by 3 December 2017, including $10.7 million in China, Singapore, Malaysia, and the United Kingdom, and $15.3 million in other territories including Japan. The film went on gross $11,943,229 in China, $525,280 in the United States and Canada, $46,664 in Thailand and Bolivia, $191,137 in South Korea, and $91,155 in Spain and the United Kingdom.)
7	Crayon Shin-chan: Invasion!! Alien Shiriri	$16,145,597	
8	Kuroko's Basketball The Movie:Last Game	$7,313,308	
9	Fate/stay night: Heaven's Feel Ch.1 - Presage Flower	$6,763,368	
10	No Game No Life: Zero	$6,356,284	(Note: The original release of the film in 2017-18 grossed a total of $4,386,487 worldwide and the 2019 re-release in China grossed a further $1,969,797. Therefore, including all releases, the total gross becomes $6,356,284.)
