= Orion Pitts =

American voice actor

- Born: Orion Ryan Pitts; March 18, 1980 (age 46); Jackson, Mississippi, United States
- Other name: Ryan Pitts
- Education: Newman Smith High School
- Occupation: Voice actor
- Years active: 1998–present

Orion Ryan Pitts (born March 18, 1980) is an American voice actor who provides voices for English versions of Japanese anime series. He is known for his anime roles as Hyakunosuke Ogata from Golden Kamuy, Rintaro Kira from Kenka Bancho Otome: Girl Beats Boys, Akira from Afterlost, Daisuke Hiyama from Arifureta: From Commonplace to World's Strongest, Taichi Nanao from A3!, Jun Sazanami from Ensemble Stars!, and Ranta from Grimgar of Fantasy and Ash. He also voiced Aram from Chain Chronicle, Chihiro Kamina from Lord of Vermilion: The Crimson King and Nozomu Nanashima from Kiss Him, Not Me.

== Biography ==
He started voicing in 1998 and is associated with Funimation.

Theron Martin of Anime News Network called his role as Ranta in the English dub of Grimgar of Fantasy and Ash "the strongest casting choice and performance".

== Filmography ==
=== Anime ===
List of dubbing performances in anime
Year	Title	Role	Notes	Source
1999	One Piece	Saldeath / Billy		
2000	Initial D	Sakamoto		
2001	YuYu Hakusho	Shu		
2002	Kiddy Grade	Teenager kid		
2003	The Galaxy Railways	Hijackar		
2004	AM Driver	Shin Pius		
2004	Beck: Mongolian Chop Squad	Togo	English dub	
School Rumble	Takeichi Fuyuki			
2005	Tsubasa: Reservoir Chronicle	Ryuuou		
2005	Mushishi	Taku		
2005	Black Cat	Emilio Lowe		
2006	School Rumble: 2nd Semester	Takeichi Fuyuki		
2006	Jyu-Oh-Sei	Assassin		
2006	Tsubasa Reservoir Chronicle 2nd Season	Ryuuou		
2007	Peach Girl	Kairi Okayasu		
2007	SoltyRei	Andy Anderson		
2007	Hell Girl	Koukichi		
2007	Witchblade	Doctor		
2007	Ragnarok the Animation	Rai		
2007	Suzuka	Kazuki Tsuda		
2007	2008	School Rumble: 3rd Semester	Takeichi Fuyuki	
Corpse Princess	2008	Nakamura		
Ghost Hunt	2008	Sakauchi Tomoaki		
2009	Birdy the Mighty: Decode 2	Yuuichi Kagami		
2009	Kenichi: The Mightiest Disciple	Yoshi Tanaka		
2009	Blassreiter	Leo		
2009	Big Windup!	Takehiko Aoki		
2010	Cat Planet Cuties	Satoshi Fukuhara	Funimation Dub	
2010	Sekirei Season 2	Ashikabi		
2010	The Legend of the Legendary Heroes	Moe Velariore		
2011	Baka and Test	Student, Teacher		
2012	Hyouka	Tayama Kazuya		
2013	Attack on Titan	Keiji	Funimation Dub	
2014	Tokyo Ghoul	Shuu		
2014	Noragami	Hashimoto		
2014	Tokyo ESP	Segawa		
2015	Concrete Revolutio	Molly		
2015	Kamisama Kiss 2nd Season	Year God		
2015	Dragon Ball Super	Arak		
2015	Aria the Scarlet Ammo AA	Boy student, Banker robber		
2015	Assassination Classroom	Taisei Yoshida		
2015	The Rolling Girls	Noboru		
2015	World Break: Aria of Curse for a Holy Swordsman	Takenaka		
2016	All Out!!	Masaru Ebumi	Funimation Dub	
2016	Izetta: The Last Witch	Thomas		
2016	Assassination Classroom Season 2	Taisei Yoshida		
2016	Chaos Dragon	Swallow Cratsvalley		
2016	Trickster	Hide		
2016	Grimgar of Fantasy and Ash	Ranta		
2016	Kiss Him, Not Me	Nozomu Nanashima / Shion		
2017	Chain Chronicle	Aram, Olzada		
2017	Attack on Titan Season 2	Keiji	Funimation Dub	
2017	Star Blazers: Space Battleship Yamato 2199	Koji Saeki		
2017	In Another World with My Smartphone	Masakage Yamagata		
2017	Black Clover	Goht	English dub	
2017	Nanbaka 2nd Season	Daisen Kokoriki		
2017	Classroom of the Elite	Yahiko Totsuka		
2017	Blood Blockade Battlefront	Deldro Brody & Dog Hummer		
2017	King's Game The Animation	Toshifumi Sakakibara		
2017	Sakura Quest	Kinoshita		
2017	Kenka Bancho Otome: Girl Beats Boys	Rintaro Kira		
2017	Akashic Records of Bastard Magic Instructor	Rito Librio		
2017	Tsugumomo	Kotetsu		
2017	ACCA: 13-Territory Inspection Dept.	Koruri		
2018	Dances with the Dragons	Maslow Gossum		
2018	Golden Kamuy	Hyakunosuke Ogata		
2018	Tokyo Ghoul:re	Yoshiki Okura		
2018	High School DxD Hero	Connla	English dub	
2018	Hoshin Engi Season 2	Nentou Doujin		
2018	Chio's School Road	Kohai / Biker		
2018	Black Clover Season 2	Goth / Vetto (Young)	English dub	
2018	Kakuriyo: Bed and Breakfast for Spirits	Akatsuki		
2018	Yamada-kun and the Seven Witches	Kentaro Tsubaki		
2018	My Hero Academia Season 3	Yosetsu Awase		
2018	Legend of the Galactic Heroes	Olivier Poplan		
2018	Golden Kamuy Season 2	Hyakunosuke Ogata		
2018	Attack on Titan Season 3	Keiji	Funimation Dub	
2018	A Certain Magical Index	Copilot	English version	
2018	Lord of Vermilion: The Crimson King	Chihiro Kamina		
2019	Ensemble Stars!	Jun Sazanami		
2019	Mix	Fumimura		
2019	Afterlost	Akira		
2019	Endro!	Desuyochan B		
2019	My Hero Academia Season 4	Yosetsu Awase		
2019	Stars Align	Takeru Tanaka	English dub	
2019	The Morose Mononokean Season 2	Norito Saga		
2019	Boogiepop and Others	Shinjirō Ano		
2019	Arifureta: From Commonplace to World's Strongest	Daisuke Hiyama		
2019	The Ones Within	Kenya Kudō	English dub	
2019	Wise Man's Grandchild	Mark Bean		
2020	Infinite Dendrogram	Mohawk X		
2020	Golden Kamuy Season 3	Hyakunosuke Ogata		
2021	A3!	Taichi Nanao		
2021	My Hero Academia Season 5	Yosetsu Awase		
2022	Arifureta: From Commonplace to World's Strongest Season 2	Daisuke Hiyama		
2022	Tomodachi Game	Hyakutarō Onigawara		
2022	Golden Kamuy Season 4	Hyakunosuke Ogata		
2023	In Another World With My Smartphone 2	Yamagata Masakage		
2023	Sacrificial Princess and the King of Beasts	Lanteveldt		
2023	Frieren	Kraft		
2024	Classroom of the Elite Season 3	Yahiko Totsuka		
2024	Wind Breaker	Kyōtarō Sugishita		
2024	Fairy Tail: 100 Years Quest	Nebaru		
2025	Yakuza Fiancé: Raise wa Tanin ga Ii	Ryuichi Minami		
2025	Gachiakuta	Hell Guard Instructor		
2025	Kakuriyo: Bed & Breakfast for Spirits	Akatsuki		

=== Film ===
List of voice performances in films
Year	Title	Role	Notes	Source
2007	One Piece: Episode of Alabasta - The Desert Princess and the Pirates	Duck D / Villagers		
2011	Fullmetal Alchemist: The Sacred Star of Milos	Student	Additional voices	
2015	The Empire of Corpses	Teenager / Child		
2016	Chain Chronicle: The Light of Haecceitas - Movie 1	Aram		
2016	Assassination Classroom The Movie: 365 Days' Time	Taisei Yoshida		
2017	Chain Chronicle: The Light of Haecceitas - Movie 2	Aram, Olzada		
2017	Chain Chronicle: The Light of Haecceitas - Movie 3	Aram, Olzada		
2018	Attack on Titan Movie 3: The Roar of Awakening	Keiji	English dub	
2022	Ginga Eiyuu Densetsu: Die Neue These - Gekitotsu	Olivier Poplan		
2022	One Piece Film: Red	Eboshi	English dub	

=== Web series ===
Year	Title	Role	Notes	Source
2011	Hetalia: Axis Powers	Students		
2016	Koro Sensei Quest	Taisei Yoshida		
2017	Nanbaka	Daisen Kokoriki	English version	

=== Video games ===
List of voice performances in video games
Year	Title	Role	Notes	Source
2020	Dragon Ball Z: Kakarot	Z-fighter / Time traveller	PlayStation 4	
