= The Invisible Man and His Soon-to-Be Wife =

Japanese manga series

- First wideban volume cover, featuring Akira Tounome (left) and Shizuka Yakou (right)

透明男と人間女～そのうち夫婦になるふたり～ (Tōmei Otoko to Ningen Onna: Sonouchi Fūfu ni Naru Futari)
- Genre: Romantic comedy; Supernatural
- Manga
- Written by: Iwatobineko
- Published by: Futabasha
- English publisher: NA: Seven Seas Entertainment
- Imprint: Action Comics
- Magazine: Web Action
- Original run: September 4, 2021 – present
- Volumes: 10
- Anime television series
- Directed by: Mitsuho Seta
- Written by: Mitsuho Seta
- Music by: Ruka Kawada
- Studio: Project No.9
- Licensed by: Crunchyroll: SEA: Plus Media Networks Asia
- Original network: Tokyo MX, BS NTV, SUN, KBS Kyoto
- Original run: January 8, 2026 – March 26, 2026
- Episodes: 12
- icon

The Invisible Man and His Soon-to-Be Wife (Japanese: 透明男と人間女～そのうち夫婦になるふたり～, Hepburn: Tōmei Otoko to Ningen Onna: Sonouchi Fūfu ni Naru Futari) is a Japanese manga series written and illustrated by Iwatobineko. It originally began as a webcomic published on the author's Twitter account in March 2021. It was later acquired by Futabasha who began serializing it on the Pixiv Comic website under their Web Action brand in September that year. An anime television series adaptation produced by Project No.9 aired from January to March 2026.

== Plot ==
In a world where humans, demi-humans and monsters co-exist, Shizuka Yakou is a quiet and bashful woman who works at a small detective agency. Her employer, Tounome, is the refined and courteous owner of the agency, who possesses the unusual ability to turn invisible. While his power is invaluable for investigative work, it proves ineffective on Yakou, who is blind, yet can always sense Tounome's presence. Intrigued and charmed by her perceptiveness and gentle nature, Tounome develops romantic feelings for her and begins looking for opportunities to grow closer. As Yakou navigates her daily work, she is supported by the agency's eccentric staff, including Kikira, a blunt and unsociable human man, and Jarashi, a warm and protective beast woman.

== Characters ==
Shizuka Yakou (夜香 しずか, Yakō Shizuka)
Voiced by: Hina Yōmiya (voice comic), Yuka Nukui (anime)
Akira Tounome (透乃眼 あきら, Tōnome Akira)
Voiced by: Yūichirō Umehara (voice comic), Yōhei Azakami (anime)
Luna Jarashi (写螺子 ルナ, Jarashi Runa)
Voiced by: Riho Sugiyama
Daichi Kikira (鬼木羅 だいち, Kikira Daichi)
Voiced by: Masaya Fukunishi
Karma (カルマ, Karuma)
Voiced by: Tomohiro Ōno
Light (ライト, Raito)
Voiced by: Kaori Ishihara
Kousuke Madaraito (斑糸 コウスケ, Madaraito Kōsuke)
Voiced by: Junya Enoki
Twin (トゥイン, Tuin)
Voiced by: Shinnosuke Tachibana

== Media ==
=== Manga ===
Written and illustrated by Iwatobineko, The Invisible Man and His Soon-to-Be Wife began as a webcomic published on the author's Twitter account on March 1, 2021. It was later acquired by Futabasha who began serializing it on the Pixiv Comic website under their Web Action brand on September 4, 2021. Futabasha began releasing it in wideban volumes on November 28, 2021, with ten volumes released as of October 30, 2026.

During their panel at Anime Expo 2022, Seven Seas Entertainment announced that they had licensed the series for English publication beginning in February 2023.

No.	Original release date	Original ISBN	North American release date	North American ISBN
1	November 28, 2021	978-4-575-44010-2	February 28, 2023	978-1-68579-465-1
1. "The Soon-to-Be Couple"; 2. "Getting Over the Jitters"; 3. "Tounome Detective Agency"; 4. "Yakou's Workday"; 5. "Dark Elf Can't Read the Room"; 6. "Operation "Date""; 7. "All-Out War"; 8. "A Tough Call"; 9. "Pitch Black"; 10. "Tounome and Yakou"; Bonus: "Soon-to-Be 1–3"
2	September 28, 2022	978-4-575-44028-7	August 8, 2023	978-1-68579-460-6
11. "The First Week Together"; 12. "Found Out"; 13. "Couple Things"; 14. "Office Intervention"; 15. "A Sudden Cold"; 16. "An Invisible Client"; 17. "Company Retreat"; Bonus: "In the Mountains"; Bonus: "Swimsuits..."; Bonus: "At night..."; Bonus: "Detective Tales"
3	March 30, 2023	978-4-575-44035-5	February 27, 2024	979-8-88843-392-8
18. "The First Time"; 19. "Meeting Her Mother: Take Two"; 20. "Karuma and Tounome Out of Sorts"; 21. "Donuts Time!"; 22. "An Interracial Couple"; 23. "Different Couples, Different Stories"; 24. "Career Exploration"; 25. "Why Be a Detective?"; 26. "The Fragrance of the Moon"; 27. "And Then"; Bonus: "When It Comes to Oysters... (in Kikira and Madaraito's Case)"; Bonus: "When It Comes to Fur... (in Jarashi and Yakou's Case)"; Bonus: "When It Comes to Dates... (in Yakou and Tounome's Case)"
4	September 29, 2023	978-4-575-44044-7	September 10, 2024	979-8-89160-494-0
28. "Their First Sleepover"; 29. "A Fun Way to Ring in the New Year"; 30. "Jarashi's Melancholy"; 31. "Yakou and Kikira"; 32. "Trust"; 33. "Ghost Hunt Amidst the Hot Spring Haze"; 34. "Accident"; 35. "The Ghost's True Identity"; 36. "Revealed"; Bonus: "Jarashi's Shopping Trip"; Bonus: "Reunion with the Elf Couple"; Bonus: "After the Hot Springs Stay"
5	March 29, 2024	978-4-575-44052-2	March 4, 2025	979-8-89373-173-6
37. "Meeting the Yakou Family"; 38. "Greeting Yakou's Father"; 39. "Greeting the Tounome Family"; 40. "The Tounome Family"; 41. "Reminiscing"; 42. "Different Daily Lives"; 43. "Can't Fool Fuuta"; 44. "Fuuta's Final Verdict"; 45. "After Sleeping Over"; Bonus: "An Anecdote from Tounome's Stay at Yakou's Home 1–2"; Bonus: "Kinguro's Past"; Bonus: "A Christmas Together"
6	November 29, 2024	978-4-575-44069-0	December 30, 2025	979-8-89561-451-8
46. "A New Life With Twins"; 47. "Moving"; 48. "Crush"; 49. "Does Sharing a House Mean Sharing a Bed?"; 50. "Living Together"; 51. "Karuma and Light"; 52. "Kikira's Babysitting Challenge"; 53. "Yuu Makes Things Right"; 54. "Fuuta Comes Over to Hang Out"; 55. "A Veranda Chat While the Brother's Away"; Bonus: "The Couple Who Came to Buy a Table"; Bonus: "Oni, Love, and Flowers"; Bonus: "Near Miss"; Bonus: "Boyfriend Shirt"; Bonus: "Shall We Dance?"
7	July 14, 2025	978-4-575-44092-8	June 16, 2026	979-8-89765-369-0
56. "Goodbye Kiss"; 57. "Thinking About Marriage"; 58. "What Do You Mean "Thinking"?"; 59. "The Two at the Bar"; 60. "After Cooking Off"; 61. "I Don't Like It"; 62. "Opening Party"; 63. "Akou and Fashion"; 64. "A Hot Boss"; 65. "A Hot Lover"; Bonus: "The Two at the Bar, Part 2"; Bonus: "Yuu's Growth Spurt"; Bonus: "Luna and Akou"; Bonus: "Cohabitation Challenge: Bathtime"
8	December 25, 2025	978-4-575-44107-9	December 22, 2026	979-8-89863-247-2
9	April 10, 2026	978-4-575-44113-0	June 22, 2027	979-8-90209-048-9
10	October 30, 2026	978-4-575-44133-8	—	—

=== Anime ===
An anime television series adaptation was announced on November 27, 2024. It is produced by Project No.9 and directed and written by Mitsuho Seta, with character designs by Kairi Unabara and music composed by Ruka Kawada. The series was initially scheduled for 2025, but was later delayed, and eventually aired from January 8 to March 26, 2026, on Tokyo MX and other networks. The opening theme song is "Ding-dong", performed by Mao Abe, while the ending theme song is "Hoshimegane" (星眼鏡; 'Star Glasses), performed by Kaori Ishihara. Crunchyroll is streaming the series. Plus Media Networks Asia licensed the series in Southeast Asia and broadcasts it on Aniplus Asia.

==== Episodes ====
Every episode is written by Mitsuho Seta.

No.	Title	Directed by (Note: Production staff information is taken from the ending credits of each episode.)	Storyboarded by	Original release date
1	"The Soon-to-be Couple"; Transliteration: "Sonōchi Fūfu ni Naru Futari" (Japanese: そのうち夫婦になるふたり)	Tomoya Takashima	Mitsuho Seta	January 8, 2026
2	"The Great Date Plan"; Transliteration: "Dēto Dai Sakusen" (Japanese: デート大作戦)	Asahi Yoshimura	Mitsuho Seta	January 15, 2026
3	"Dating For a Week"; Transliteration: "Tsukiai Hajimete 1-Shūkan" (Japanese: 付き合いはじめて1週間)	Masato Takeuchi	Masato Takeuchi	January 22, 2026
4	"Don't Let Them Expose You"; Transliteration: "Abaka Secha Iyadesu" (Japanese: 暴かせちゃイヤです)	Tomoka Takashima	Mitsuho Seta	January 29, 2026
5	"It Was My First, So..."; Transliteration: "Hajimete Datta no de" (Japanese: 初めてだったので)	Asahi Yoshimura	Mitsuho Seta	February 5, 2026
6	"A Place Where I (You) Belong"; Transliteration: "Watashi no (Kimino) Ibasho" (Japanese: わたしの（きみの）居場所)	Asahi Yoshimura	Mitsuho Seta	February 12, 2026
7	"I Want You By My Side"; Transliteration: "Soba ni Ite Hoshīdesu" (Japanese: そばにいてほしいです)	Tomoka Takashima	Mitsuho Seta	February 19, 2026
8	"I Guess I'm Being Selfish"; Transliteration: "Wagamama, desu yo ne" (Japanese: わがまま、ですよね)	Asahi Yoshimura	Mitsuho Seta; Satoshi Takahara & Tora Jun	February 26, 2026
9	"Being Who I Am"; Transliteration: "Arinomama de Iru Koto" (Japanese: ありのままでいること)	Taiki Nishimura	Kenta Yoyoka	March 5, 2026
10	"Before We Move in Together..."; Transliteration: "Dōsei Suru Mae ni…" (Japanese: 同棲する前に…)	Tomoka Takashima	Tomoka Takashima	March 12, 2026
11	"The Invisible Person Village"; Transliteration: "Tōmei Ningen no Sato" (Japanese: 透明人間の里)	CHAFIK	CHAFIK	March 19, 2026
12	"A Big Moment"; Transliteration: "Iyoiyo" (Japanese: いよいよ)	Mitsuho Seta	Yūya Fukuda	March 26, 2026

=== Other ===
In commemoration of the release of its fourth volume on September 29, 2023, a voice comic adaptation was released on Futabasha's YouTube channel that same day. It featured the voice performances of Yūichirō Umehara and Hina Yōmiya.

== Reception ==
The Encyclopedia of Science Fiction described The Invisible Man and His Soon-to-Be Wife as a likeable, gentle romantic comedy, praising its charming central relationship and relaxed atmosphere, although noting that some viewers might find it excessively sentimental. It observed that the series' fantasy, science fiction and detective elements remained secondary to the protagonists' developing romance, but highlighted its exploration of perception, communication, social marginalization and discrimination. The encyclopedia particularly praised the eleventh episode, in which the blind protagonist visits a village inhabited by invisible people, contrasting her perception of its bustling streets with the apparently deserted environment seen by viewers. It also commended the episode's animation and its exploration of the distinctive social experiences of invisible people.

== See also ==
- The Country Without Humans, another manga series by the same creator
