= The Fledgling Demon Lord's Starter Shop =

Japanese manga series

- First tankōbon volume cover, featuring Villager (front) and Mao (background)

すだちの魔王城 (Sudachi no Maōjō)
- Genre: Fantasy comedy
- Manga
- Written by: Makoto Morishita
- Published by: Kodansha
- English publisher: Kodansha (digital)
- Imprint: Monthly Shōnen Magazine Comics
- Magazine: Monthly Shōnen Magazine
- Original run: October 6, 2021 – present
- Volumes: 14
- Anime television series
- Directed by: Jun Hira
- Written by: Keiichirō Ōchi
- Music by: Takurō Iga
- Studio: Project No.9
- Original network: Tokyo MX, MBS, BS11
- Original run: January 2027 – scheduled
- icon

The Fledgling Demon Lord's Starter Shop (Japanese: すだちの魔王城, Hepburn: Sudachi no Maōjō) is a Japanese manga series written and illustrated by Makoto Morishita. It has been serialized in Kodansha's shōnen manga magazine Monthly Shōnen Magazine since October 2021. An anime television series adaptation produced by Project No.9 is set to premiere in January 2027.

== Plot ==
Following the Demon Lord's defeat, peace leaves a young boy named Villager adrift. With no more battles to fight, demand for potions and adventuring gear vanishes, and his shop, The Nest, stands nearly empty. Facing closure, he struggles to find purpose in a world that no longer needs his trade. One day, a mysterious girl named Mao arrives, bringing unexpected change. Her presence disrupts the quiet stagnation of the shop, and her enigmatic nature hints at deeper secrets. Though the world believes the age of conflict has ended, her arrival suggests that new challenges may yet emerge, forcing Villager to reconsider his role in a changing land.

== Characters ==
Villager (ムラビト, Murabito)
Voiced by: Reiji Kawashima
Mao (マオ)
Voiced by: Rumi Okubo
Ash (アッシュ, Asshu)
Voiced by: Yōhei Azakami

== Media ==
=== Manga ===
Written and illustrated by Makoto Morishita, The Fledgling Demon Lord's Starter Shop started in Kodansha's shōnen manga magazine Monthly Shōnen Magazine on October 6, 2021. Kodansha has collected its chapters into individual tankōbon volumes. The first volume was released on May 17, 2022. As of October 16, 2026, fourteen volumes have been released.

In August 2025, Kodansha added the series to its K Manga digital platform.

==== Volumes ====
No.	Japanese release date	Japanese ISBN
1	May 17, 2022	978-4-06-527557-3
2	July 14, 2022	978-4-06-528069-0
3	November 16, 2022	978-4-06-529467-3
4	March 16, 2023	978-4-06-530799-1
5	July 14, 2023	978-4-06-531992-5
6	November 16, 2023	978-4-06-533420-1
7	March 15, 2024	978-4-06-535080-5
8	July 17, 2024	978-4-06-535835-1
9	November 15, 2024	978-4-06-537783-3
10	April 16, 2025	978-4-06-538288-2
11	August 12, 2025	978-4-06-540501-7
12	January 16, 2026	978-4-06-542032-4
13	July 16, 2026	978-4-06-543479-6
14	October 16, 2026	978-4-06-544992-9

=== Anime ===
In June 2026, an anime television series adaptation was announced. The series will be produced by Project No.9 and directed by Jun Hira, with series composition by Keiichirō Ōchi, character designs by Katsuyuki Sato, and music composed by Takurō Iga. It is set to premiere in January 2027 on Tokyo MX and other networks.

== Reception ==
The series ranked 12th in the 2022 Next Manga Award in the print manga category; it placed fifth in the 2023 edition.

== See also ==
- Im: Great Priest Imhotep, another manga series by the same author
