= Ro-Kyu-Bu! =

Japanese light novel series

- Cover of the first light novel featuring Tomoka Minato

ロウきゅーぶ! (Rōkyū Bu)
- Genre: Comedy, sports (basketball)
- Light novel
- Written by: Sagu Aoyama
- Illustrated by: Tinkle
- Published by: ASCII Media Works
- Imprint: Dengeki Bunko
- Magazine: Dengeki Bunko Magazine
- Original run: February 10, 2009 – July 10, 2015
- Volumes: 15
- Manga
- Written by: Sagu Aoyama
- Illustrated by: Yūki Takami
- Published by: ASCII Media Works
- Magazine: Dengeki G's Magazine; Dengeki G's Comic
- Original run: August 30, 2010 – January 30, 2017
- Volumes: 12
- Manga

Ro-Kyu-Bu! Yonkoma
- Written by: Sagu Aoyama
- Illustrated by: Futaba Miwa
- Published by: ASCII Media Works
- Magazine: Dengeki Moeoh
- Original run: June 2011 – October 2013
- Volumes: 2
- Anime television series
- Directed by: Keizō Kusakawa
- Produced by: Satoshi Fujita; Jun Fukuda; Atsushi Wada
- Written by: Michiko Itō
- Music by: Takeshi Watanabe
- Studio: Project No.9; Studio Blanc
- Licensed by: NA: Sentai Filmworks
- Original network: AT-X, KBS Kyoto, Tokyo MX, TV Kanagawa, Sun TV, Chiba TV, TV Aichi, Teletama
- English network: US: Anime Network
- Original run: July 1, 2011 – September 24, 2011
- Episodes: 12
- Video game
- Developer: Vridge
- Publisher: ASCII Media Works; Kadokawa Games
- Genre: Visual novel
- Platform: PlayStation Portable
- Released: October 27, 2011
- Manga

Ro-Kyu-Bu! Halftime
- Written by: Sagu Aoyama
- Illustrated by: Yūki Takami
- Published by: ASCII Media Works
- Magazine: Dengeki G's Festival! Comic
- Original run: October 26, 2012 – August 29, 2015
- Volumes: 3
- Video game

Ro-Kyu-Bu! Himitsu no Otoshimono
- Developer: Vridge
- Publisher: ASCII Media Works; Kadokawa Games
- Genre: Visual novel
- Platform: PlayStation Portable
- Released: June 20, 2013
- Original animation DVD

Ro-Kyu-Bu!: Tomoka no Ichigo Sundae
- Directed by: Keizō Kusakawa (Chief); Shinsuke Yanagi
- Produced by: Satoshi Fujita; Jun Fukuda; Atsushi Wada; Nobuhiro Nakayama
- Written by: Michiko Itō
- Music by: Takeshi Watanabe
- Studio: Project No.9
- Released: June 20, 2013
- Runtime: 25 minutes
- Anime television series

Ro-Kyu-Bu! SS
- Directed by: Keizō Kusakawa (Chief); Shinsuke Yanagi
- Produced by: Satoshi Fujita; Jun Fukuda; Atsushi Wada; Nobuhiro Nakayama
- Written by: Michiko Itō
- Music by: Takeshi Watanabe
- Studio: Project No.9
- Original network: AT-X, Tokyo MX, Sun TV, KBS Kyoto, TV Aichi, BS11
- Original run: July 5, 2013 – September 27, 2013
- Episodes: 12
- Video game

Ro-Kyu-Bu! Naisho no Shutter Chance
- Developer: Vridge
- Publisher: ASCII Media Works; Kadokawa Games
- Genre: Visual novel
- Platform: PlayStation Vita
- Released: March 27, 2014

Ro-Kyu-Bu! (Japanese: ロウきゅーぶ!, Hepburn: Rōkyū Bu) is a Japanese light novel series written by Sagu Aoyama and illustrated by Tinkle. ASCII Media Works published 15 novels between February 2009 to July 2015. The series follows a high school freshman Subaru Hasegawa who becomes the coach of a grade school's girls' basketball team after his own basketball club is disbanded for a year due to a scandal. Three manga adaptations and three PlayStation Portable visual novel games were produced. A 12-episode anime television series, animated by Project No.9 and Studio Blanc, aired between July and September 2011. A 12-episode second season titled Ro-Kyu-Bu! SS, animated solely by Project No.9, aired between July and September 2013.

== Plot ==
High school freshman Subaru Hasegawa is forced to stop playing basketball at his school for a while when the team captain gets himself involved in a scandal for being suspected of sexually abusing a little girl, and the club is disbanded for a year. His aunt, Mihoshi Takamura, then assigns him to be an elementary school girls' basketball team coach. Initially, he agreed to train the girls just for three days, but after learning of their circumstances, he decided to keep coaching them. Thanks to the girls, Subaru's passion for basketball is reignited as his efforts to improve their skills come to fruition and he becomes close friends with them.

== Characters ==
=== Keishin Academy ===
==== Coaching staff ====
Subaru Hasegawa (長谷川 昴, Hasegawa Subaru)
Voiced by: Yuki Kaji
The main protagonist and a high school student who is tasked by his aunt to coach an all female sixth grade school basketball team. Currently, his school's basketball club had its activities suspended after its team captain got himself involved in a scandal for being suspected of being a child molester. He reluctantly accepts Mihoshi's offer for him to train the girls for only three days initially, until he learns that the club is at the brink of being disbanded without his help, realizing how important it is to Tomoka and her friends. After helping save the basketball team, Subaru ends up agreeing to be their trainer until they graduate.
Aoi Ogiyama (荻山 葵, Ogiyama Aoi)
Voiced by: Kanae Itō
Aoi is Subaru's childhood friend and also a former member of his school's basketball club, who displays feelings for him despite refusing to admit them. She is always prone to help Subaru when he is in trouble or depressed, but for some reason he avoids telling her he is coaching a team of elementary schoolgirls, until she follows him and finds it by herself. She later becomes Subaru's assistant coach and then becomes the coach for the fifth grade team upon its formation, and then again Subaru's assistant coach once the two teams are united.
Mihoshi Takamura (篁 美星, Takamura Mihoshi)
Voiced by: Shizuka Itō
Subaru's aunt who was chosen as the adviser of the basketball team despite having no knowledge of the sport at all. She blackmailed Subaru by threatening to expose embarrassing moments of his childhood if he would not help her with the club. Despite her age, she strongly resembles a little girl.
Touko Hatano (羽多野 冬子, Hatano Tōko)
Voiced by: Rina Satō
Touko is the School nurse in Keishin Academy. She is the one who gave nicknames to each of the girls, except for Tomoka, whose nickname was chosen by Subaru himself. She seems to have yuri tendencies to Mihoshi, which annoys the other.

==== Sixth graders ====
Tomoka Minato (湊 智花, Minato Tomoka)
Team Jersey Number: 4
Position: Shooting Guard
Voiced by: Kana Hanazawa
The heroine of the series, the best player of the team and the only one who had played basketball before. It does not take long for Subaru to find great potential in her, and thanks to her talent and dedication he decides to keep coaching them. She has not been in Keishin Academy for long, in her previous school she became so obsessed with winning that it caused her to become isolated and was forced to transfer. In Keishin Academy, she found new friends and realized that winning is not everything. Despite the fact that she still loves basketball, Tomoka is not willing to play without having her friends with her. Of all the girls, Tomoka is the one who gets closest to Subaru and seems to be the one who likes him the most. Due to her talent in basketball, Subaru nicknamed her "Shiny Gift" (シャイニー・ギフト, Shainī Gifuto; lit. 'Flowers, that bloom in the rain').
Maho Misawa (三沢 真帆, Misawa Maho)
Team Jersey Number: 5
Position: Power Forward
Voiced by: Yuka Iguchi
Coming from an extremely wealthy family, Maho is the most energetic member of the team, who is always coming up with ideas that always seem to cause embarrassment for the other girls. She was the first of the girls to befriend Tomoka, as well as the reason Tomoka decided to form the girls' basketball club. She is afraid of the dark. She is also described by Takenaka to be a genius, quickly adapting to any sport she gains interest in. Unfortunately she also loses interest just as fast, which is the source of her split with him due to his seriousness of basketball and her developing interest. Due to her hyperactive nature, Touko-sensei nicknamed her "Fire Works" (ファイヤー・ワークス, Faiyā Wākusu).
Saki Nagatsuka (永塚 紗季, Nagatsuka Saki)
Team Jersey Number: 6
Position: Shooting Guard, Point Guard
Voiced by: Yoko Hikasa
The bespectacled and level-headed member of the team, who keeps Maho in check whenever the latter goes overboard with her enthusiasm. She also stops Maho and Takenaka from fighting as well. She works with her father in an okonomiyaki shop, and whenever they start to cook okonomiyaki, Saki becomes serious at it. Due to her solid personality and composure, Touko-sensei nicknamed her "Ice Age" (アイス・エイジ, Aisu Eiji; lit. 'Snow Queen').
Airi Kashii (香椎 愛莉, Kashii Airi)
Team Jersey Number: 7
Position: Center
Voiced by: Rina Hidaka
The most quiet and shy girl of the five. Due to being too tall and well endowed for her age, she has an extreme complex about her height, which causes her to burst into tears whenever any mention of it is being made. Though midway through the second season she seems to have overcome it, not even turning a hair when Aya Miyakoōji calls her tall. In fact, she even encourages Aya on the benefits of being the tallest on the court. She happens to be the oldest girl in the group as well, being born in April. When younger, she fell from a boat into a lake and since then developed a mild case of aquaphobia that prevents her from swimming, though she overcame this too and can now swim like a pro. Due to her timidity and extreme shyness, Touko-sensei nicknamed her "Prismatic Bird" (プリズマティック・バド, Purizumatikku bado; lit. 'Two colors of seven birds').
Hinata Hakamada (袴田 ひなた, Hakamada Hinata)
Team Jersey Number: 8
Position: Point Guard, Small Forward
Voiced by: Yui Ogura
The smallest of the girls who often speaks in a polite manner and has a large collection of plush toys. Despite looking like she is the most innocent and naive of the team, sometimes her behavior suggests otherwise. She is the youngest of the girls, being born in March (due to the fact that in Japan, schools start term in April). Due to being favored by all boys in her class and her innocent looks and love and naivete, Touko-sensei nicknamed her "Innocent Charm" (イノセント・チャーム, Inosento Chāmu; lit. 'Naive devilish innocence'). Hinata has an overprotective, younger sister named Kagetsu who is significantly taller and more physically developed than she is, and eventually joins the basketball club alongside her.

==== Fifth graders ====
Kagetsu Hakamada (袴田 かげつ, Hakamada Kagetsu)
Team Jersey Number: 9
Position: Forward-center
Voiced by: Asami Seto
Hinata's younger sister. Unlike the frail Hinata who has just recently learned basketball, Kagetsu has incredible stamina and is a marathon runner in school. One snowy day, while asleep alone at home, she did not notice Hinata coming back from school. When she woke up, she was horrified to find her freezing with cold outside their door. She believed that it severely weakened her body, and blamed herself for it. Since then, she worries about Hinata whenever she engages in physical activity.
When Hinata's team went to the beach, Kagetsu followed her there with the help of the school nurse Touko Hatano, and was shocked to see that their basketball coach is a high school boy. She was initially wary of Subaru, but toned down a little when he helped her mend her strained relationship with her sister. Kagetsu eventually joins her sister Hinata's basketball team and trains as a forward-center.
Mimi Balguerie (ミミ・バルゲリー, Mimi Barugerī)
Team Jersey Number: 10
Position: Small Forward
Voiced by: Misaki Kuno
Mimi's height appearance is the same or higher than Hinata's. She sometimes wears an expressionless face and has yet to show her feelings, especially when playing basketball. Mimi used to be a member of a club during her time in France and in Hawaii learned how to play basketball. Her basketball skills are on a higher level than Tomoka's. Having been born from a French father and Japanese mother, she frequently mixes French phrases into her speech. Her family couldn't adapt to the environment of Hawaii and due to her father's work for the Japanese laboratory to be done in Hawaii, Mimi transferred to Keishin Academy and placed into Kagetsu's class. Her jersey number while playing in France is 33.
Tsubaki Takenaka (竹中 椿, Takenaka Tsubaki) and Hiiragi Takenaka (竹中 柊, Takenaka Hīragi)
Team Jersey Number: 11 (Tsubaki); 12 (Hiiragi)
Position: Power Forward (Tsubaki); Guard-Forward (Hiiragi)
Voiced by: Minami Tsuda (Tsubaki); Aya Suzaki (Hiiragi)
Natsuhi's little twin sisters. Even if the twins practice basketball with Natsuhi, Natsuhi himself does not acknowledge their talent. They are very fond of their brother and are jealous of the attention he gives towards Hinata. The combination of the twins is so strong that draws their opponents into confusion. Due to the combination and the fact that they share the same personality and thoughts, they are nicknamed "TsubaHii" (つばひー, Tsuba hi ̄), sharing the first parts of their names. To avoid confusion, Tsubaki wears a yellow hairpin on the left side of her hair while Hiiragi wears a purple hairpin on the right side of her hair.
Masami Fujii (藤井 雅美, Fujii Masami)
Team Jersey Number: 13
Position: Shooting Guard
Voiced by: Risa Taneda
A very stubborn girl and a childhood acquaintance of Saki. She is also Saki's rival because both their families own restaurants and, before the start of the series, Masami's store lost to Saki's to be featured in a magazine.

=== Suzuridani Academy ===
Miyu Aida (藍田 未有, Aida Miyu)
Team Jersey Number: 4
Position: Point Guard
Voiced by: Mariya Ise
Miyu is a sixth grader and is the ace of the basketball team who maintains a friendly rivalry with Tomoka. She requested for Rena to be included in the final tournament knowing her talent, despite Rena's poor attitude towards her teammates. Maho calls her "Little Girl with the Ribbon" (ちびリボン, Chibi Ribon).
Aya Miyakoōji (都大路 綾, Miyakoōji Aya)
Team Jersey Number: 12
Position: Center
Voiced by: Yumi Hara
Formerly of their school's gymnastics team, she is drafted into the basketball team when her height became a detriment to her routines. She has forged a friendship with Airi, told to her by her teammates to be taller than her.
Rena Ashihara (葦原 怜那, Ashihara Rena)
Team Jersey Number: 13
Voiced by: Akiko Hasegawa
She first made herself known to the Takenaka twins with a braggart swagger and beat them in a 2-on-1 basketball game. The deal between them is supposed to be amongst themselves, but dealing with her has become an affair for the whole team, particularly Masami, when she accidentally messes up with her operations during the food festival. She is used to, and is excellent in, 1-on-1 basketball, but she was forced to play 5-on-5 during an important tournament, something she is not accustomed to, and against Keishin—the very team she crossed.

=== Others ===
Kazunari Uehara (上原 一成, Uehara Kazunari)
Voiced by: Yoshitsugu Matsuoka
Kazunari is Subaru's friends since middle school. He has an ordinary appearance with short hair and rimless glasses. An intellectual who aspired to the University of Tokyo, he was ranked first in his class in junior high school even without studying. Although he often angers Subaru and Aoi with his insensitive remarks and gets beaten up, he firmly understands the line that must not be crossed, and even though he uses a teasing tone, he worries about Subaru who has lost his place in club activities. There are also parts of him that care about his friends, such as memorizing Town magazine articles about their accomplishments. He proposed the formation of a basketball club, and a number of himself joined. Subaru is also secretly grateful for that, but since he ruins it with his own usual remarks, it is a bit tricky.
Natsuhi Takenaka (竹中 夏陽, Takenaka Natsuhi)
Voiced by: Minako Kotobuki
He is the captain of the boys' basketball team and is Tsubaki and Hiiragi's older brother. He initially believed that the girls' basketball club should be disbanded as, to him, its members are only playing around instead of truly competing unlike his club. He harbors a crush on Hinata, a fact known by all his classmates. He is also childhood friends with both Maho and Saki, and fell out with Maho over basketball, although they eventually make up.
Nayu Hasegawa (長谷川 七夕, Hasegawa Nayu)
Voiced by: Mamiko Noto
Nayu is Subaru's mother and Mihoshi's elder sister. She was worried about her son after he was forced to stop playing basketball at school, and was relieved knowing that his enthusiasm was renewed after he became the girls' coach.
Ginga Hasegawa (長谷川 銀河, Hasegawa Ginga)
Voiced by: Takehito Koyasu
An archeologist who is Subaru's father and Nayu's husband. Ginga is also a skilled basketball player who is friends with Mimi's father and is taking care of her during her stay in Japan by his request.
Shinobu Minato (湊 忍, Minato Shinobu)
Voiced by: Ryotaro Okiayu
Tomoka's father who opposes his daughter playing basketball at first due to the incident with her at her previous school, until he is convinced by Subaru to reconsider.
Kaori Minato (湊 花織, Minato Kaori)
Voiced by: Yumi Uchiyama
Tomoka's mother and Shinobu's wife who first appears by surprise at Subaru's house to thank him and his mother for taking care of her daughter.
Banri Kashii (香椎 万里, Kashii Banri)
Voiced by: Kenji Hamada
Airi's older brother who studies at Subaru's school and usually scares her due to his serious and imposing figure, to the point that she starts avoiding him. Thanks to Subaru and the other girls, he eventually mends his relationship with his sister and joins Subaru's effort to revive their school's basketball team.
Ryuuichi Suga (須賀竜一, Suga Ryūichi)
Voiced by: Shintarō Asanuma
An old rival of Subaru who always defeated him until he starts to get used to his techniques. When playing, he'd rather force his teammates to follow his own pace instead of cooperating with them.
Ogasawara (小笠原)
Voiced by: Ryo Iwasaki
The coach of Keishin Academy's boys' basketball team. He and Mihoshi are considered rivals, and is often called "Mantis" by her much to his dismay.

== Media ==
=== Light novels ===
Ro-Kyu-Bu! began as a light novel series written by Sagu Aoyama with illustrations by Tinkle. Originally, Aoyama entered the first novel in the series into ASCII Media Works' 15th Dengeki Novel Prize in 2008 and the novel won the Silver Prize. ASCII Media Works published 15 novels under their Dengeki Bunko imprint between February 10, 2009, and July 10, 2015.

=== Manga ===
A manga adaptation, illustrated by Yūki Takami, began serialization in the October 2010 issue of ASCII Media Works' Dengeki G's Magazine. The manga ended serialization in the magazine's May 2014 issue and was transferred to Dengeki G's Comic starting with the June 2014 issue. The first tankōbon volume was released on April 27, 2011; 12 volumes were released in total. A four-panel comic strip manga, titled Ro-Kyu-Bu! Yonkoma (ロウきゅーぶ! よんこま) and illustrated by Futaba Miwa, was serialized from June 2011 to October 2013 issues of ASCII Media Works' Dengeki Moeoh magazine and compiled into two volumes. The first tankōbon volume was released on April 27, 2012; the second followed on September 27, 2013. A spin-off manga, titled Ro-Kyu-Bu! Halftime (ロウきゅーぶ! は〜ふたいむ) and illustrated by Yūki Takami, began serialization in volume 26 of ASCII Media Works' Dengeki G's Festival! Comic on October 26, 2012, and ended on August 29, 2015. It was compiled into three volumes. The first tankōbon volume was released on August 27, 2013.

=== Anime ===
A 12-episode anime television series, animated by Project No.9 and Studio Blanc, aired in Japan between July 1 and September 24, 2011, on the AT-X network, and was later rebroadcast on KBS Kyoto, Tokyo MX, TV Kanagawa, Sun TV, Chiba TV, TV Aichi, and Teletama. The series is directed by Keizō Kusakawa with Michiko Itō as script supervisor. The opening theme is "Shoot!" and the ending theme is "Party Love (Okkiku Naritai)" (Party Love〜おっきくなりたい〜); both songs are sung by Ro-Kyu-Bu!, a five-member group consisting of Kana Hanazawa, Yuka Iguchi, Rina Hidaka, Yui Ogura, and Yōko Hikasa. Sentai Filmworks licensed the anime for simulcast, though were later requested by the production committee to relinquish home video rights. The Anime Network aired the series in the United States. An original video animation, titled Ro-Kyu-Bu!: Tomoka no Ichigo Sundae, was bundled with the release of the PlayStation Portable game Ro-Kyu-Bu!: Himitsu no Otoshimono on June 20, 2013.

A 12-episode second season titled Ro-Kyu-Bu! SS, animated by Project No.9 and directed by Shinsuke Yanagi, aired between July 5 and September 27, 2013. The opening theme is "Get goal!" and the ending theme is "Rolling! Rolling!"; both songs are sung by the five-member group Ro-Kyu-Bu!.

=== Video games ===
Two PlayStation Portable (PSP) visual novels were developed by Vridge and published by ASCII Media Works and Kadokawa Games. The first, titled Ro-Kyu-Bu!, was released on October 27, 2011. The second, titled Ro-Kyu-Bu! Himitsu no Otoshimono (ロウきゅーぶ! ひみつのおとしもの), was released on June 20, 2013. A PlayStation Vita game titled Ro-Kyu-Bu! Naisho no Shutter Chance (ロウきゅーぶ! ないしょのシャッターチャンス) developed by Vridge was released on March 27, 2014, release. According to the announcement, the genre of the game is "loli sports shooting adventure".

== See also ==
- Angel's 3Piece! — Another light novel series by the same author.
