= Im: Great Priest Imhotep =

Japanese manga series

- Cover of the first volume, featuring Imhotep

Im～イム～
- Genre: Action, supernatural
- Manga
- Written by: Makoto Morishita
- Published by: Square Enix
- English publisher: NA: Yen Press
- Magazine: Monthly Shōnen Gangan
- Original run: January 10, 2015 – August 10, 2018
- Volumes: 11
- icon

Im: Great Priest Imhotep (Im～イム～) is a Japanese manga series written and illustrated by Makoto Morishita. It was serialized in Square Enix's Monthly Shōnen Gangan from January 2015 to August 2018 and published in eleven volumes.

== Publication ==
Written and illustrated by Makoto Morishita, the series originated as a one-shot, before beginning serialization as a full series in Square Enix's Monthly Shōnen Gangan on January 10, 2015. The series completed its serialization on August 10, 2018. The series' individual chapters were collected into 11 tankōbon volumes.

In June 2017, Yen Press announced that they licensed the series for English publication digitally. A print release was announced at Anime Expo 2019. The manga is also licensed by Elex Media Komputindo in Indonesia.

=== Volumes ===
No.	Original release date	Original ISBN	English release date	English ISBN
1	July 22, 2015	978-4-75-754689-9	February 4, 2020	978-1-97-533282-2
2	September 19, 2015	978-4-75-754737-7	March 31, 2020	978-1-97-539945-0
3	January 22, 2016	978-4-75-754857-2	May 26, 2020	978-1-97-531144-5
4	May 21, 2016	978-4-75-754975-3	August 25, 2020	978-1-97-531145-2
5	September 21, 2016	978-4-75-755118-3	November 17, 2020	978-1-97-531146-9
6	January 21, 2017	978-4-75-755217-3	December 1, 2020	978-1-97-531147-6
7	May 22, 2017	978-4-75-755342-2	January 26, 2021	978-1-97-531148-3
8	September 22, 2017	978-4-75-755474-0	March 30, 2021	978-1-97-531149-0
9	January 22, 2018	978-4-75-755584-6	June 1, 2021	978-1-97-531150-6
10	May 22, 2018	978-4-75-755714-7	July 27, 2021	978-1-97-531151-3
11	September 21, 2018	978-4-75-755843-4	October 5, 2021	978-1-97-531152-0

== Reception ==
Rebecca Silverman of Anime News Network praised the use of mythology and genre stereotypes, though she felt the story dragged in the middle. Leroy Douresseaux of Comic Book Bin praised the action scenes and some of the characters, though he felt some of the characters were also underutilized.

In AnimeJapan 2019's Most Wanted Anime Adaptation Poll, the series ranked first.

== See also ==
- The Fledgling Demon Lord's Starter Shop, another manga series by the same author
