= The Country Without Humans =

Japanese manga series

- First tankōbon volume cover

人間のいない国 (Ningen no Inai Kuni)
- Genre: Drama; Science fiction; Supernatural
- Manga
- Written by: Iwatobineko
- Published by: Futabasha
- English publisher: NA: Seven Seas Entertainment
- Imprint: Action Comics
- Magazine: Monthly Action
- Original run: October 25, 2019 – May 25, 2023
- Volumes: 5

The Country Without Humans (人間のいない国, Ningen no Inai Kuni) is a Japanese manga series written and illustrated by Iwatobineko. It was serialized in Futabasha's Monthly Action magazine from October 2019 to May 2023.

== Synopsis ==
The series is set in a world occupied only by artificially-made beings known as golems. Shii is a human girl who after running away from golems named Triangle Heads, meets a golem named Bulb and seeks to become friends with him.

== Publication ==
Written and illustrated by Iwatobineko, The Country Without Humans was serialized in Futabasha's seinen manga magazine Monthly Action from October 25, 2019, to May 25, 2023. The series' chapters were collected into five tankōbon volumes released from April 10, 2020, to August 9, 2023. The series is licensed in English by Seven Seas Entertainment.

No.	Original release date	Original ISBN	North American release date	North American ISBN
1	April 10, 2020	978-4-575-85430-5	December 21, 2021	978-1-64827-844-0
2	November 12, 2020	978-4-575-85513-5	March 22, 2022	978-1-63858-161-1
3	September 9, 2021	978-4-575-85635-4	December 27, 2022	978-1-63858-360-8
4	August 10, 2022	978-4-575-85743-6	September 12, 2023	978-1-63858-983-9
5	August 9, 2023	978-4-575-85871-6	May 28, 2024	979-8-88843-774-2

== See also ==
- The Invisible Man and His Soon-to-Be Wife, another manga series by the same creator
