= Bottom-tier Character Tomozaki =

Japanese light novel series and its adaptations

- First light novel volume cover, featuring Aoi Hinami

弱キャラ友崎くん (Jaku-kyara Tomozaki-kun)
- Genre: Romantic comedy
- Light novel
- Written by: Yūki Yaku
- Illustrated by: Fly
- Published by: Shogakukan
- English publisher: NA: Yen Press
- Imprint: Gagaga Bunko
- Original run: May 18, 2016 – October 16, 2026
- Volumes: 12 (Note: 14 light novels in total have been released including two short story collections.)
- Manga
- Written by: Yūki Yaku
- Illustrated by: Eight Chida
- Published by: Square Enix
- English publisher: NA: Comikey (digital)
- Magazine: Monthly Gangan Joker
- Original run: December 22, 2017 – February 22, 2021
- Volumes: 6
- Manga

Minami Nanami Wants to Shine
- Written by: Yūki Yaku
- Illustrated by: Bana Yoshida
- Published by: Shogakukan
- English publisher: NA: Yen Press
- Magazine: MangaONE; Monthly Sunday Gene-X
- Original run: July 18, 2020 – January 19, 2023
- Volumes: 3
- Anime television series
- Directed by: Shinsuke Yanagi
- Written by: Fumihiko Shimo
- Music by: Hiromi Mizutani
- Studio: Project No.9
- Licensed by: Crunchyroll (Note: In North America through Crunchyroll, LLC (formerly known as Funimation).); SEA: Plus Media Networks Asia
- Original network: AT-X, Tokyo MX, BS11
- English network: SEA: Aniplus Asia
- Original run: January 8, 2021 – March 27, 2024
- Episodes: 27
- icon

Bottom-tier Character Tomozaki (Japanese: 弱キャラ友崎くん, Hepburn: Jaku-kyara Tomozaki-kun), also known as The Low Tier Character "Tomozaki-kun", (Note: This title is seen on the cover of the Japanese version of the light novel.) is a Japanese light novel series written by Yūki Yaku and illustrated by Fly. Shogakukan published the series in 12 volumes from May 2016 to October 2026 under their Gagaga Bunko imprint. A manga adaptation with art by Eight Chida was serialized in Square Enix's shōnen manga magazine Monthly Gangan Joker from December 2017 to February 2021. It has been collected in six tankōbon volumes. The light novel is licensed in North America by Yen Press. An anime television series adaptation produced by Project No.9 aired from January to March 2021. A second season aired from January to March 2024.

== Plot ==
Fumiya Tomozaki is a high school student who is on top of the leaderboards of the popular online game Attack Families under the in-game handle "nanashi". A social outcast, he regards Attack Families as a "godly game" that has perfect balance where equal amounts of effort is rewarded with equal amounts of success. In contrast, he considers real life to be a "trash game". One day following a match against the number two player "NO NAME", they agree to meet in person. When they do so, Tomozaki is surprised to find out NO NAME is actually a classmate of his named Aoi Hinami. Taken aback that Tomozaki is nanashi, Hinami decides to help him overcome his issues.

== Characters ==
Fumiya Tomozaki (友崎 文也, Tomozaki Fumiya)
Voiced by: Yoshitsugu Matsuoka (commercial), Gen Satō (anime) (Japanese); Adam Gibbs (English)
Tomozaki is a high school student who has been living as a social outcast at school. Due to his success in Attack Families, he often compares both his real life and gaming life. His perspectives begins to change as it is revealed to him that his perfect classmate Aoi Hinami, who all along has been trailing behind him at second place on Attack Families' leaderboards, regards real life as a winnable game and offers to be his walkthrough. He has a younger sister.
Aoi Hinami (日南 葵, Hinami Aoi)
Voiced by: Haruka Tomatsu (commercial), Hisako Kanemoto (anime) (Japanese); Faye Mata (English)
Hinami is Tomozaki's classmate who has been regarded as a perfect existence. She essentially excels at everything she does, whether socially, academically or in sports by leading her own class clique, topping the school in grades and excelling at track and field competitions, all while maintaining a likable personality. Behind the scenes, she puts in a terrifying amount of hard work, and is a strong believer of concrete, dedicated effort in order to succeed at everything. Hinami is also an avid fan of Attack Families, where she goes by "NO NAME", and hugely respects "nanashi" who she could not surpass despite her efforts in analyzing his playstyle and perfecting her defense techniques. She later becomes the student council president of their school.
Minami Nanami (七海 みなみ, Nanami Minami)
Voiced by: Ikumi Hasegawa (Japanese); Christina Kelly (English)
Nicknamed "Mimimi" by her friends and "Minmi" by Tama, she is an energetic, mischievous and popular classmate of Tomozaki who is in the track and field club with Hinami. While maintaining a cheerful demeanor, she has insecurities about herself and her personality that gives in easily to not ruin the mood. Mimimi has been persistent in pestering the lonely Tama into being her friend, and thus eventually established a close friendship with her. Despite her goofy appearance, she also excels at both studies and sports, yet is unable to dethrone Hinami, who perpetually holds first place. She ran against Hinami in the student council election but lost.
Fūka Kikuchi (菊池 風香, Kikuchi Fūka)
Voiced by: Ai Kayano (Japanese); Natalie Hoover (English)
Fūka is a reserved and book-loving classmate of Tomozaki who often spends time at the library. She initially took interest in Tomozaki under the misunderstanding that they both share an interest in the same author, whereas Tomozaki only used those books as a cover while doing strategic reviews on Attack Families in the library. Tomozaki comes forward and admits the misunderstanding, and despite that still resolves to try to read and understand the books Fūka loves, as they develop a friendship on it. Hinami initially identifies Fūka as the best prospect for Tomozaki to capture as a girlfriend, and has created multiple situations in order for Tomozaki to confess to clear his goal. She and Tomozaki end up dating.
Hanabi Natsubayashi (夏林 花火, Natsubayashi Hanabi)
Voiced by: Ryōko Maekawa (Japanese); Amber Connor (English)
Nicknamed "Tama" by her friends, she is a blunt and unsociable classmate of Tomozaki. Tama is especially close to Mimimi as Mimimi was the first to try and break through her barriers and befriend her, and they hold each other dear. Her blunt nature often leaves her disliked and, once, got her into trouble as she openly condemned Erika's actions of harassment and bullying, thus making her the target of bullying herself. As she suffers from bullying, Tomozaki, Mizusawa, Takei and Fūka, among others, decided to step in to help her develop social skills.
Yuzu Izumi (泉 優鈴, Izumi Yuzu)
Voiced by: Nene Hieda (Japanese); Kate Bristol (English)
Izumi is a social and empathetic classmate of Tomozaki who is a part of Erika's clique. As someone who dislikes conflict, she is often unwilling to stand up to Erika's unreasonable actions. Izumi was Tomozaki's first target to befriend to grow his interpersonal skills as she sits beside him in class. Izumi is in love with Nakamura, and has enlisted Tomozaki's help to teach her how to play Attack Families in order to become Nakamura's practice partner.
Takahiro Mizusawa (水沢 孝弘, Mizusawa Takahiro)
Voiced by: Nobunaga Shimazaki (Japanese); Stephen Fu (English)
Mizusawa is a popular, gregarious and good-looking classmate of Tomozaki who is a part of Nakamura's clique, as is often considered as the smartest and most level-headed member of the group. He often attracts the attention of girls and is an extremely smooth talker, as he is Tomozaki's role model on the way he speaks.
Shūji Nakamura (中村 修二, Nakamura Shūji)
Voiced by: Nobuhiko Okamoto (Japanese); Chris Hackney (English)
Nakamura is a domineering classmate of Tomozaki, who is the de facto leader of his own clique. He is overly competitive and petty when he loses, as shown when he loses to Tomozaki on Attack Families, dismissing his loss as a stroke of bad luck while practicing hard in order to win in a revenge match. He eventually accepts Tomozaki as part of his clique after acknowledging his strengths.
Takei (竹井)
Voiced by: Shuntarō Mizuno (Japanese); Matt Shipman (English)
Takei is a cheerful and airheaded classmate of Tomozaki, who is often the mood maker of Nakamura's clique. Considered as the densest member of the clique, he is often excluded from strategic meetings such as when they were planning a camping trip to get Nakamura and Izumi together. He loves to take the center of attention as he often volunteers to take class positions, and often entertains others with his spontaneous acts.
Erika Konno (紺野 エリカ, Kon'no Erika)
Voiced by: Sayaka Kaneko^{Ep. 2 credits} (Japanese); AmaLee (English)
Erika is a classmate of Tomozaki's who is the queen bee of the class. Once someone gets on her bad side, she will start to bully them.
Tsugumi Narita (成田 つぐみ, Narita Tsugumi)
Voiced by: Akane Fujita (Japanese); Sarah Wiedenheft (English)
Narita is a coworker of Tomozaki and Mizusawa's who has a lazy personality.

== Media ==
=== Light novels ===
Bottom-tier Character Tomozaki is written by Yūki Yaku and illustrated by Fly. Shogakukan published the series under their Gagaga Bunko imprint, with 12 volumes released from May 18, 2016, to October 16, 2026.

Yen Press has licensed the series in North America. The first volume was published on July 30, 2019. The English translation was done by Winifred Bird. Starting with volume 9, the novels were translated by Jennifer Ward.

==== Volumes ====
No.	Original release date	Original ISBN	English release date	English ISBN
1	May 18, 2016	978-4-09-451610-4	July 30, 2019	978-1-9753-5825-9
0. "I always feel kind of down when I watch the opening after I beat a game"; 1. "Say what you want, famous games are usually fun"; 2. "It feels awesome to gain a bunch of levels after a battle"; 3. "Hunting solo nets you a surprising number of experience points"; 4. "When a girl's your first friend, life feels like a date for a while"; 5. "Powerful techniques and equipment make it fun and easy to progress"; 6. "Sometimes you conquer a dungeon only to find a strong boss back in your village"; 7. "I always want a sequel when the final credits end"
2	September 16, 2016	978-4-09-451631-9	November 26, 2019	978-1-9753-8458-6
1. "The characters who become your friends after you clear a hard event usually have high stats"; 2. "When there's only one low-level character in the party, his level is gonna skyrocket"; 3. "Once you start speedrunning the minigames, you seriously can't stop"; 4. "When a mentor character becomes a boss, they'll push you to the edge"; 5. "It's hard not to give up on training characters who just won't improve"; 6. "There are some problems a bottom-tier character can't fix alone"; 7. "Accessories are the only equipment every character can share"
3	January 18, 2017	978-4-09-451655-5	April 21, 2020	978-1-9753-8459-3
1. "When you go back to the starter town with the full party, new stuff tends to happen"; 2. "The EXP you need for each level up changes constantly"; 3. "Multiplayer games have their own special appeal"; 4. "A single choice can change everything"; 5. "Sometimes the characters closest to you end up holding the keys to the toughest dungeons"; 6. "Equipment for girls has special effects"
4	June 20, 2017	978-4-09-451683-8	August 18, 2020	978-1-9753-5825-9
1. "When your regular attacks improve, adventures get way easier"; 2. "The best games make reconnaissance fun"; 3. "After a difficult quest, your latent abilities rise to the surface"; 4. "Even seemingly unbeatable bosses have weak points"; 5. "Sometimes you'll trigger a flag you've been ignoring when you least expect it"; 6. "A happy ending doesn't mean this game is over"
5	November 17, 2017	978-4-09-451709-5	December 1, 2020	978-1-9753-8461-6
1. "Even with good stats, quests can be tough without armor"; 2. "Battles go better when you're fighting alongside someone whose signature move is the opposite of yours"; 3. "Villagers have their own way of life"; 4. "Sometimes the victory flag and white flag are both just pieces of paper"; 5. "If you keep upgrading your initial equipment, they'll usually become your most powerful weapon"
6	May 18, 2018	978-4-09-451733-0	March 23, 2021	978-1-9753-8462-3
1. "Everyone has different expectations about a big event"; 2. "Even fetch quests raise your level"; 3. "Important items are usually lying around in enchanted forests"; 4. "Sometimes the main character can't enter the village of another species on his own"; 5. "If you don't make up your mind, the story won't advance"
6.5	October 18, 2018	978-4-09-451757-6	August 17, 2021	978-1-9753-2038-6
1. "The melancholy of the pre-perfect heroine"; 2. "A shopping trip"; 3. "Girl talk"; 4. "The color of words"; 5. "A diary from May of second year"; 6. "One cold morning at the station"; 7. "Fast enough to leave it all behind"; 8. "Pot stickers"; 9. "Drunk on nonalcoholic cocktails"; 10. "What happened next"
7	April 18, 2019	978-4-09-451785-9; 978-4-09-451789-7 (SE)	January 11, 2022	978-1-9753-3346-1
1. "You can't undo an event once it happens"; 2. "When you know what items you need, your destination decides itself"; 3. "The patterns carved into the stone-paved hill are connected to the mysteries of the world"; 4. "TFW the heroine turns out to be stronger than the hero"; 5. "Sometimes the final boss has gone through things that only a final boss could have gone through"; 6. "Even fairies feel lonely when they're away from their spring by themselves"; 7. "Some spells don't use MP"; 8. "You're sure to find what you want on the other side of the magic door"
8	October 18, 2019	978-4-09-451815-3	April 19, 2022	978-1-9753-3550-2
1. "New stories always start in the first town"; 2. "The adventure only begins for real when you can choose the destination yourself"; 3. "When you're fighting in your element, you hardly ever lose"; 4. "Ultimately, the people in front of the screen determine the outcome of the game"; 5. "The most important thing in any game is whether you can genuinely enjoy it"; 6. "Whenever you trigger one flag, another one always seems to break"
8.5	April 17, 2020	978-4-09-451840-5; 978-4-09-451850-4 (SE)	October 4, 2022	978-1-9753-3840-4
1. "First Christmas"; 2. "A nameless flower"; 3. "The girlfriend of the guy I like"; 4. "Lies and morning glow"; 5. "All together now"; 6. "An angel in the kotatsu"; Bonus Track: "The virtual reality adventure of Tomozaki the Warrior"
9	January 19, 2021	978-4-09-451878-8	January 17, 2023	978-1-9753-3926-5
1. "If you walk around while poisoned, eventually you're going to pass out"; 2. "Often, you only realize how important your friends are once they've left the party"; 3. "A hero with both physical attacks and healing can adventure alone"; 4. "An elven bow pierces weaknesses with high accuracy"; 5. "There's always a price to pay for a secret ability"; 6. "When you try to throw away something important, someone will always come stop you"; 7. "You can't change your base stats so easily"
10	January 18, 2022	978-4-09-453045-2	June 20, 2023	978-1-9753-6028-3
1. "Events that only happen on certain days are generally important"; 2. "When another party member specializes in an opposing element, you might get a powerful new move"; 3. "Mastering Gadabout enables you to switch to a surprisingly strong job class"; 4. "A boss that won't take damage no matter what you do is often weak to healing"; 5. "Even when you think you've won, the demon lord often has another form"
11	January 18, 2024	978-4-09-453114-5	April 29, 2025	979-8-8554-1270-3
1. "Put down the controller, and you'll never get anywhere in the story"; 2. "If you're sent to a new world, your party members will often land in different spots"; 3. "Casting a revival spell on you when you're cursed makes it instant death"; 4. "No matter how leveled you are, it's game over if you get bad RNG"; 5. "A magic mirror will always reflect the dark lord's true form"
12	October 16, 2026	978-4-09-453114-5	—	—

=== Manga ===
A manga adaptation illustrated by Eight Chida was serialized in Square Enix's Monthly Gangan Joker from December 22, 2017, to February 22, 2021. Its chapters were collected in six tankōbon volumes. The manga adaptation is licensed digitally in North America by Comikey.

A spin-off manga series, illustrated by Bana Yoshida, titled Minami Nanami Wants to Shine (七海みなみは輝きたい, Nanami Minami wa Kagayakitai), started in Shogakukan's MangaONE app and Monthly Sunday Gene-X magazine on July 18, 2020. The series focuses on the character Minami Nanami. It finished in Monthly Sunday Gene-X on January 19, 2023. Its chapters were collected in three tankōbon volumes. The series is also licensed in English by Yen Press.

==== Volumes ====
===== Bottom-tier Character Tomozaki =====
No.	Japanese release date	Japanese ISBN
1	May 18, 2018	978-4-7575-5713-0
2	October 18, 2018	978-4-7575-5871-7
3	April 17, 2020	978-4-7575-6619-4
4	December 18, 2020	978-4-7575-7010-8
5	February 22, 2021	978-4-7575-7099-3
6	April 22, 2021	978-4-7575-7209-6

===== Minami Nanami Wants to Shine =====
No.	Original release date	Original ISBN	English release date	English ISBN
1	December 18, 2020	978-4-09-157618-7	March 22, 2022	978-1-9753-3898-5
2	September 17, 2021	978-4-09-157640-8	July 26, 2022	978-1-9753-4791-8
3	January 19, 2023	978-4-09-157719-1	February 20, 2024	978-1-9753-7648-2

=== Anime ===
An anime adaptation was announced by Yūki Yaku and Gagaga Bunko on October 11, 2019, which was later confirmed to be a television series on March 21, 2020. The series was animated by Project No.9 and directed by Shinsuke Yanagi, with Fumihiko Shimo handling series composition, and Akane Yano designing the characters. Hiromi Mizutani composed the music.

The 12-episode series aired from January 8 to March 26, 2021, on AT-X, Tokyo MX, and BS11. The opening theme song is "Life Easy?" (人生イージー？, Jinsei Ījī?), while the ending theme song is "Ayafuwa Asterisk" (あやふわアスタリスク, Ayafuwa Asutarisuku), both performed by Dialogue+. An OVA is bundled with the third Blu-ray and DVD volume of the series, which was released on May 7, 2021. Another OVA is bundled with the fourth Blu-ray and DVD volume of the series, which was released on June 2, 2021.

Funimation licensed the series and streamed it on its website in North America and the British Isles, in Europe through Wakanim, and in Australia and New Zealand through AnimeLab. On March 11, 2021, Funimation announced the series would receive an English dub, with the first episode premiering the next day. Following Sony's acquisition of Crunchyroll, the series was moved to Crunchyroll. In Southeast Asia, the series has been simulcast on Aniplus Asia.

On January 14, 2022, it was announced that a new anime project was green-lit, which was later confirmed to be a 13-episode second season, titled Bottom-tier Character Tomozaki 2nd Stage, with the cast and staff from the previous season reprising their roles. It aired from January 3 to March 27, 2024. The opening theme song is "Easy? Hard? But Let's Move On!" (イージー？ハード？しかして進めっ！, Ījī? Hādo? Shikashite Susume!), while the ending theme song is "Because It's Not Someone" (誰かじゃないから, Dareka Janai Kara), both performed again by Dialogue+. Part of the story in the fourth volume of the novel series was trimmed to leave more time for the story afterwards.

==== Episodes ====
===== Season 1 (2021) =====
No. overall	No. in season	Title (Note: All English titles are taken from Funimation.)	Directed by	Written by	Storyboarded by	Original release date
1	1	"Say what you want; famous games are usually fun" Transliteration: "Nandakanda Itte Yūmei na Gēmu wa Daitai Omoshiroi" (Japanese: なんだかんだ言って 有名なゲームは大体おもしろい)	Haruo Ōgawara	Fumihiko Shimo	Shinsuke Yanagi	January 8, 2021
Fumiya Tomozaki, a self-proclaimed bottom-tier character who views the real world as a trash game and spends most of his time playing video games, has a match in the Yontendo Smotch game Attack Families against a player called NO NAME and wins. After the match, NO NAME asks Tomozaki to meet up. To his surprise, NO NAME turns out to be his classmate and model student Aoi Hinami. Hinami brings Tomozaki to her house and worried about his well-being, Hinami becomes his guide to life by structuring it as a game walkthrough with a series of missions to give it the appearance of a god-tier game. Hinami's first mission has Tomozaki wearing a mask to get him to become conscious of his appearance.
2	2	"It feels awesome to gain a bunch of levels after a battle" Transliteration: "Ikkai no Sentō de Reberu ga Renzoku de Agaru to Metcha Kimochi ii" (Japanese: 一回の戦闘でレベルが連続で上がるとめっちゃ気持ちいい)	Kana Kawana	Fumihiko Shimo	Keiichi Ishikura	January 15, 2021
Tomozaki is tasked with talking to three girls he has never conversed with before while wearing a mask. The first girl is the one sitting next to him in homeroom Yuki Izumi, and he asks her for a tissue. He also speaks with the girl behind her, Fūka Kikuchi. Next, he has an awkward conversation with Minami "Mimimi" Nanami in his home economics class, drawing the attention of her friend Hanabi "Tama" Natsubayashi and Tomozaki's gaming buddy Shūji Nakamura. Nakamura picks on Tomozaki, but Hinami intervenes and teases him in return. After school, Hinami lets Tomozaki know that Nakamura holds a grudge against him for losing to him in Attack Families. The next day, Tomozaki takes the mask off and is tasked with improving his posture and having a conversation with Mimimi after school. The two have a much more normal conversation while heading home from school. The next day, Hinami praises Tomozaki for his improved conversational skills and gives him some flash cards and a pocket recorder to help him continue to improving them. Hinami then assigns Tomozaki to spend the next day on a date with her.
3	3	"When a girl's your first friend, life feels like a date for a while" Transliteration: "Hitorime no Nakama ga On'na no Ko da to Shibaraku Dēto Kibun de Bōken Dekiru" (Japanese: 一人目の仲間が女の子だとしばらくデート気分で冒険できる)	Masahiro Okamura	Satoru Sugisawa	Takafumi Hoshikawa	January 22, 2021
After meeting up, Hinami takes Tomozaki to the mall in order to teach him how to change his appearance. The two shop at an apparel store, and Tomozaki's communication is still awkward when he asks the salesman for the mannequin rather than trying out the clothes on it. The two then have lunch and run into Fūka, who works as a part-time waitress. On the following Monday, Hinami tasks Tomozaki with talking to Izumi at least twice a day for the week, as well as to go on a date with another girl. During the week, Tomozaki has brief and awkward conversations with Izumi, struggling to come up with things to talk about. At the end of the week having barely fulfilled the quota, Tomozaki visits the library and is approached by Fūka, who asks Tomozaki to read a novel she is writing, and Hinami suggests that Tomozaki dates her, though Tomozaki is hesitant for being insincere. After leaving the school, Tomozaki meets up with Izumi, who asks him to teach her how to play Attack Families.
4	4	"Sometimes you conquer a dungeon only to find a strong boss back in your village" Transliteration: "Danjon Kōryaku-go ni Mura ni Kaeru to Tsuyoi Bosu ga Itari Suru" (Japanese: ダンジョン攻略後に村に帰ると強いボスがいたりする)	Haruo Ōgawara	Fumihiko Shimo	Hiroyuki Shimazu	January 29, 2021
Izumi brings Tomozaki to her house to have him teach how to play Attack Families due to her crush Nakamura spending more of his time playing the game. Afterwards, Hinami gives Tomozaki a pair of tickets for a movie preview screening to ask Fūka out on a date. On the following school day, Tomozaki converses with Fūka in the library, but does not ask her to go to the movies. As Tomozaki is about to leave school for the day, Nakamura's clique forces Tomozaki to stay and play Attack Families against a vengeful Nakamura with Hinami, Izumi, and a clique led by Erika Konno watching. Tomozaki and Nakamura play several rounds with Tomozaki winning every time. Nakamura's losing streak causes Erika to criticize Nakamura for wasting his effort in the game, but Tomozaki stands up for him telling Erika to not mock somebody else's effort when she did not put in any of her own. Sometime later, Tomozaki asks Hinami to see the movie together and she agrees to do so, albeit a different movie due to scheduling conflicts.
5	5	"The characters who become your friends after you clear a hard event usually have high stats" Transliteration: "Nankan Ibento Kōryaku-go ni Nakama ni Naru Kyara wa Daitai Nōryoku-chi Takai" (Japanese: 難関イベント攻略後に仲間になるキャラはだいたい能力値高い)	Toshiaki Kanbara	Shingo Nagai	Yoshihiro Takamoto	February 5, 2021
With Nakamura's birthday coming up, Tomozaki asks Izumi to go shopping for a present. Hinami and Nakamura's friend Takahiro Mizusawa tag along on the shopping trip to the mall. While at the mall, Tomozaki is tasked by Hinami with making two successful group suggestions, which he is struggling to do. Mizusawa brings the group a store where he applies a hair salon product on Tomozaki's hair to improve his appearance, while Izumi buys her present for Nakamura. Tomozaki then buys his present from an electronics store. The group has a meal at a pizzeria suggested by Mizusawa before going home. The next day, Hinami criticizes Tomozaki for making only one group suggestion and not putting much thought into it, while lecturing him about how to make a successful suggestion, which is to make something appear good even if it is not, like the pizza. In homeroom, Hinami and Mimimi decide to run for student council president.
6	6	"Once you start speedrunning the minigames, you seriously can't stop" Transliteration: "Gēmu-nai Gēmu o Yari Dasu to Maji de Tomaranai" (Japanese: ゲーム内ゲームをやり出すとマジで止まらない)	Kazuto Fujiwara	Shingo Nagai	Atsushi Satō	February 12, 2021
Hinami pauses her counseling sessions for the student council election and suggests that Tomozaki become Mimimi's campaign manager. Mimimi initially refuses his offer until he points out some key mistakes in her campaign. Tomozaki explains his motivation in that he sees Hinami as a video game boss that he wants to defeat. In aiding Mimimi's campaign, Tomozaki takes her to see the volleyball club, and after licking Tama's bellybutton, she asks her friend Shiori to get the sports clubs to support her. After school, Mimimi explains that her reason for running is to finally beat Hinami as she finished second to her in everything. After studying Hinami's campaign more, Tomozaki asks Tama to help out in Mimimi's campaign. Tomozaki then comes up with the main focal point of the campaign by installing air conditioners in every classroom to get the votes of the first years. Tomozaki and Mimimi then come up with a campaign speech.
7	7	"When a mentor character becomes a boss, they'll push you to the edge" Transliteration: "Shishō Kyara ga Bosu ni Naru to Tsumu Kurai Tsuyokattari Suru" (Japanese: 師匠キャラがボスになると詰むくらい強かったりする)	Isamu Yamaguchi	Shingo Nagai	Hiroaki Shimura	February 19, 2021
Tomozaki and Hinami are walking in the hallway where Tomozaki admits that he is treating the election like it is one of their online battles. During her campaign speech, Hinami reveals that she plans to install air conditioners in every classroom, which catches Tomozaki and Mimimi off guard. When it is Mimimi's turn, Tomozaki decides to help her by having her ad-lib her speech. Once the campaign is over with, it is revealed that Hinami won the election. Afterwards, Mimimi thanks Tomozaki for helping her. Later, Hinami praises Tomozaki for his effort despite the loss. She then has him meet Fūka at the library. There, he asks an elated Fūka if she wants to see a movie. The next day, Tama tells Tomozaki how she and Mimimi first met and why she admires her. After school, Tomozaki, Hinami, Mimimi, and Tama hang out together where Tomozaki notices something is off with Mimimi.
8	8	"There are some problems a bottom-tier character can't fix alone" Transliteration: "Tei-reberu no Kyara Dake ja Kaiketsu Dekinai Mondai mo Aru" (Japanese: 低レベルのキャラだけじゃ解決できない問題もある)	Project No.9	Shingo Nagai	Keiichi Ishikura	February 26, 2021
Mimimi reminisces about her time in middle school when Hinami's school defeated hers in a basketball game during round two of the Saitama Prefectural Tournament. At school, everyone is worried that Mimimi has been overworking herself following the election. When Tomozaki expresses his concern to her after school, Mimimi appeals to his nature as a gamer. Later, Tomozaki learns how Hinami and Mimimi's rivalry started. Two days later, Tomozaki notices that Mimimi has skipped track practice. Once he catches up with her, she reveals the reason why she pushes herself against Hinami. The class soon discovers that Mimimi has quit the club. As such, Tomozaki and Tama decide to walk home together with Mimimi. While they are alone, a distraught Mimimi admits that she quit because she has conflicted feelings towards Hinami. Tama then comforts her, which helps Mimimi overcome her issues. Afterwards, she apologizes to Tomozaki, Tama, and Hinami and she gives them matching gifts.
9	9	"When you go back to the starter town with the full party, new stuff tends to happen" Transliteration: "Nakama o Soroete Saisho no Machi ni Modoru to Atarashii Ibento ga Okitari Suru" (Japanese: 仲間を揃えて最初の街に戻ると新しいイベントが起きたりする)	Project No.9; Yoshihisa Matsumoto	Yuka Yamada	Kazuya Iwata	March 5, 2021
At the start of summer break, Tomozaki meets up with Hinami at the mall. Hinami criticizes Tomozaki's sloppy appearance, while also assigning him to go on a date with Fūka. In preparation for the date, Hinami has Tomozaki dating her as a dress rehearsal for it, all while helping him buy clothes and other things to improve his appearance. The next day, Tomozaki, Hinami, Mimimi and Mizusawa come over to Tomozaki's house to discuss plans for their upcoming trip. Mizusawa also shows Tomozaki how to properly use the hair salon products he bought at the mall. Sometime later, Tomozaki and Fūka go on their date to see a movie, and it goes relatively smoothly. Wanting to go out with Fūka again, Tomozaki takes Hinami's suggestion to watch the upcoming fireworks show with her and she accepts. In the meantime, Tomozaki packs his bags in preparation for the trip.
10	10	"Multiplayer games have their own special appeal" Transliteration: "Taninzū Purei ni wa Taninzū Purei Nari no Yosa ga Aru" (Japanese: 多人数プレイには多人数プレイなりのよさがある)	Akira Kato	Yuka Yamada	Hiroyuki Shimazu	March 12, 2021
Tomozaki heads to the trip with Hinami, Mimimi, Izumi, Nakamura, Mizusawa, and Takei. While they are alone, Hinami instructs Tomozaki to interact with Nakamura three times. She also instructs him to become friendly with Mizusawa as well. At the camp, everyone enjoy themselves. Tomozaki later hangs out with the guys and he begins the first task. They then head to the girls' room to play the card game Tycoon. Afterwards, Tomozaki completes the second task concerning Mizusawa. At the hot springs, he completes the first task while the guys are goofing around. Later that night, everyone decides to split up into teams to take a test of courage, which allows Hinami to tease a flustered Tomozaki while they are alone. When he tries to return the favor, it leads to an awkward moment between the two.
11	11	"A single choice can change everything" Transliteration: "Tatta Hitotsu no Sentakushi ga Subete o Kaete Shimau Koto mo Aru" (Japanese: たった一つの選択肢がすべてを変えてしまうこともある)	Kazuto Fujiwara	Yuka Yamada	Yoshihiro Takamoto	March 19, 2021
In the middle of the night, Hinami asks Tomozaki to meet with her privately to check up on his progress. He tells her that he interacted with Nakamura three times to clear the task. But before they can finish their conversation, Tomozaki hides when they see Mizusawa come by. Mizusawa confesses his love for Hinami, which leads to an awkward reaction from Tomozaki. The next day, the trip ends with everybody returning home. On the day of the summer festival, Tomozaki goes out on a date with Fūka as planned. While the date goes off without any problems, Tomozaki fails to confess his love to her, as Hinami had ordered him to do. Afterward, Tomozaki and Hinami meet up at the station on the way home to talk about the date, and Tomozaki tells her that he did not feel comfortable confessing to Fūka, as he was not sure that was actually what he wanted. Hinami responds by criticizing him for his lack of resolve, expresses disdain for the principle of trying to find "what he really wants", and writes him off as a loser.
12	12	"Equipment for girls has special effects" Transliteration: "Hiroin ni Shika Sōbi Dekinai Aitemu ni wa Tokubetsu na Kōka ga Aru" (Japanese: ヒロインにしか装備できないアイテムには特別な効果がある)	Project No.9	Fumihiko Shimo	Keiichi Ishikura	March 26, 2021
Dejected by Hinami's criticism, Tomozaki goes back to his old ways. With his sister noticing how much he has regressed, she convinces him to reply to the text messages he has been receiving, among them being a date request from Fūka he received two days ago. He accepts her request and goes on a date, and much like the previous date, there is no confession, though he reveals to her that he has been taking lessons on how to improve his life and is cheered up by her approval. Sometime later, Tomozaki asks Hinami to meet him at the place they first met as nanashi and NO NAME. There, he tells her that while he agrees with her original assertion that one cannot properly judge a game without playing it, he defies her cynicism with his own belief that the only way to really win is to find what you want in life, and challenges her to learn from him how to do that. Intrigued, Hinami accepts and agrees to continue tutoring Tomozaki. His next mission is to get a part-time job, and he works as a waiter at a karaoke parlor that Mizusawa works at.
13	OVA–1	"Post-game equipment for girls is a little different than usual" Transliteration: "Endingu-go no Hiroin no Ishō wa Fudan to Chotto Chigattari Suru" (Japanese: エンディング後のヒロインの衣装は普段とちょっと違ったりする)	Takeyuki Sashihara	Yūki Yaku	Keiichi Ishikura	May 7, 2021
While taking a break at work, Fūka becomes concern when Tomozaki has not responded to her text message. Just as she is about to return to her shift, Fūka notices her classmates are sitting at a table and she asks her manager and one of her coworkers to cover for her. Meanwhile, her classmates have a conversation about their respective crushes. When Fūka heads home later that night, she receives a text from Tomozaki, much to her elation.
14	OVA–2	"Most strange spell names have unknown origins" Transliteration: "Hen na Jumon no Namae ni wa Daitai Shirarezaru Yurai ga Aru" (Japanese: 変な呪文の名前にはだいたい知られざる由来がある)	Project No.9	Yūki Yaku	Keiichi Ishikura	June 2, 2021
Hinami, Mimimi, and Tama are lighting some sparklers when they reminisce about going to the fireworks festival a year prior. A flashback shows Mimimi was in class when she noticed Tama was isolating herself. Following Hinami's advice, Mimimi began talking to Tama. After a while, Hinami secretly approached Tama and she revealed the truth as to why Mimimi was bothering her. Later on, Mimimi invited Hinami and Tama to the festival. At the festival, while the girls were watching the fireworks, Mimimi gave Tama her nickname. Back in the present, the girls head home.

===== Season 2: 2nd Stage (2024) =====
No. overall	No. in season	Title (Note: All English titles are taken from Crunchyroll.)	Directed by	Written by	Storyboarded by	Original release date
15	1	"The best games make reconnaissance fun" Transliteration: "Jōhō Shūshū Pāto ga Taikutsu Janai Gēmu wa Meisaku" (Japanese: 情報収集パートが退屈じゃないゲームは名作)	Shōto Shinkai	Fumihiko Shimo	Shinsuke Yanagi	January 3, 2024
16	2	"A happy ending doesn't mean this game is over" Transliteration: "Happīendo o Mukaeta Ato mo Jinsei wa Tsudzuku" (Japanese: ハッピーエンドを迎えたあとも人生は続く)	Takeyuki Sadohara	Fumihiko Shimo	Keiichi Ishikura	January 10, 2024
17	3	"Battles go better when you're fighting alongside someone whose signature move is the opposite of yours" Transliteration: "Tokui Waza ga Magyaku no Kyarakutā ga Ita Kata ga Sentō wa Antei Suru" (Japanese: 得意技が真逆のキャラクターがいた方が戦闘は安定する)	Yoshihisa Matsumoto	Fumihiko Shimo	Akira Nishimori	January 17, 2024
18	4	"Villagers have their own way of life" Transliteration: "Murabitotachi ni mo Kitto Murabitotachi Nari no Seikatsu ga Aru" (Japanese: 村人たちにもきっと村人たちなりの生活がある)	Norihiko Nagahama	Fumihiko Shimo	Atsushi Satō	January 24, 2024
19	5	"If you keep upgrading your initial equipment, it'll usually become your most powerful weapon" Transliteration: "Shoki Sōbi o Kitae Tsudzuketara, Daitai Saikyō no Ken ni Naru" (Japanese: 初期装備を鍛え続けたら、だいたい最強の剣になる)	Project No.9	Yūki Yaku	Shiyo Hatsumida	January 31, 2024
20	6	"Everyone has different expectations about a big event" Transliteration: "Ōkina Ibento no Ura ni wa Sorezore no Omowaku ga Aru" (Japanese: 大きなイベントの裏にはそれぞれの思惑がある)	Yoshihisa Matsumoto	Yuka Yamada	Akira Nishimori	February 7, 2024
21	7	"Important items are usually lying around in enchanted forests" Transliteration: "Yōsei ga Sumu Mori ni wa Daitai Taisetsuna Aitemu ga Ochite Iru" (Japanese: 妖精が住む森にはだいたい大切なアイテムが落ちている)	Takanori Yano	Shingo Nagai	Keiichi Ishikura	February 14, 2024
22	8	"Sometimes the main character can't enter the village of another species on his own" Transliteration: "Ta Shuzoku no Sumu Mura wa Shujinkō Dake ja Irenaka Tari Suru" (Japanese: 他種族の住む村は主人公だけじゃ入れなかったりする)	Masayuki Matsumoto	Yuka Yamada	Atsushi Satō	February 21, 2024
23	9	"If you don't make up your mind, the story won't advance" Transliteration: "Sentakushi no Mae de Mayoi Tsuzukete mo Monogatari wa Susumanai" (Japanese: 選択肢の前で迷い続けても物語は進まない)	Project No.9	Yuka Yamada	Akira Nishimori	February 28, 2024
24	10	"The patterns carved into the stone tablet are connected to the mysteries of the world" Transliteration: "Sekiban ni Kizama Reta Mon'yō wa Sekai no Nazo to Tsunagatte Iru" (Japanese: 石板に刻まれた紋様は世界の謎と繋がっている)	Masayuki Matsumoto	Yūki Yaku	Keiichi Ishikura	March 6, 2024
25	11	"Even fairies feel lonely when they're away from their spring by themselves" Transliteration: "Yōsei mo Izumi no Soto de Hitoribotchi da to Sabishī" (Japanese: 妖精も泉の外で一人ぼっちだと寂しい)	Project No.9	Yuka Yamada	Keiichi Ishikura	March 13, 2024
26	12	"Sometimes the ancient tome in the first town is the key to the final dungeon" Transliteration: "Saisho no Machi ni Aru Komonjo ga, Rasutodanjon no Kagidattari Suru" (Japanese: 最初の街にある古文書が、ラストダンジョンの鍵だったりする)	Project No.9	Shingo Nagai	Keiichi Ishikura	March 20, 2024
27	13	"You're sure to find what you want on the other side of the magic door" Transliteration: "Mahō no Tobira no Sakini wa Kitto, Hoshikatta Mono ga Korogatte Iru" (Japanese: 魔法の扉の先にはきっと、欲しかったものが転がっている)	Project No.9	Fumihiko Shimo	Shiyo Hatsumida	March 27, 2024

== Reception ==
The light novel series ranked eighth in 2017, seventh in 2018 and third in 2019 and 2020 in Takarajimasha's annual light novel guide book Kono Light Novel ga Sugoi!, in the bunkobon category.

== See also ==
- Jellyfish Can't Swim in the Night, an original anime television series written by Yūki Yaku
- Iroduku: The World in Colors, an original anime television series with character designs by Fly
- The Girl I Saved on the Train Turned Out to Be My Childhood Friend, another light novel series illustrated by Fly
- Chasing After Aoi Koshiba, a manga series illustrated by Fly
