= Angel's 3Piece! =

Japanese light novel series

- First light novel volume cover

天使の3P! (Tenshi no 3P!)
- Genre: Comedy drama
- Light novel
- Written by: Sagu Aoyama
- Illustrated by: Tinkle
- Published by: ASCII Media Works
- Imprint: Dengeki Bunko
- Original run: June 10, 2012 – February 10, 2018
- Volumes: 11
- Manga

Tenshi no 3P! no 3P!!
- Illustrated by: Omiya
- Published by: ASCII Media Works
- Magazine: Dengeki Moeoh
- Original run: December 2013 – present
- Volumes: 2
- Manga
- Illustrated by: Yuzu Mizutani
- Published by: ASCII Media Works
- Magazine: Dengeki G's Comic
- Original run: July 2014 – December 2018
- Volumes: 6
- Anime television series
- Directed by: Shinsuke Yanagi
- Written by: Gō Zappa
- Music by: Akito Matsuda
- Studio: Project No.9
- Licensed by: NA: Crunchyroll (streaming) Discotek Media (home video)
- Original network: AT-X, Tokyo MX, Sun TV, KBS, BS Fuji, tvk
- Original run: July 10, 2017 – September 25, 2017
- Episodes: 12

Angel's 3Piece! (天使の3P!, Tenshi no 3P!; lit. Here Comes the Three Angels) is a Japanese light novel series written by Sagu Aoyama and illustrated by Tinkle. ASCII Media Works published eleven volumes from June 2012 to February 2018 under their Dengeki Bunko imprint. The light novel has received a manga adaptation and a separate spin-off manga series titled Tenshi no 3P! no 3P!!. A 12-episode anime television series adaptation by Project No.9 aired between July and September 2017.

== Plot ==
Kyō Nukui is a teenager who refuses to go to school and spends his days composing songs and publishing them online. One day, he is approached by a trio of orphaned little girls who ask for his help to hold a performance at the church/orphanage where they live. Intrigued by their request and impressed with their skills, Kyō decides to help them.

== Characters ==
=== Protagonists ===
Kyō Nukui (貫井 響, Nukui Kyō)
Voiced by: Yūki Inoue
The main protagonist of the series. A shut-in high schooler, he has a love for music and publishes his songs online under the fake name of HibikiP.

=== Lien de famille ===
Jun Gotō (五島 潤, Gotō Jun)
Voiced by: Yūko Ōno
Jun is the youngest of the band girls and the guitarist. She is the most innocent and shy one, having trouble expressing herself.
Nozomi Momijidani (紅葉谷 希美, Momijidani Nozomi)
Voiced by: Yurika Endō
The oldest girl of the band and the bassist, she takes it upon herself to lead the group and thus is mostly the one in charge, addressing them as "little sisters".
Sora Kaneshiro (金城そら, Kaneshiro Sora)
Voiced by: Aoi Koga
Sora is the band's drummer and the second oldest of the trio. She is the most passive girl, always sleepy with a vacant expression on her face.

==== Little Wings Orphanage ====
Sakura Toriumi (鳥海桜花, Toriumi Sakura)
Voiced by: Kanae Itō
One of Kyō's classmates and a childhood friend of his, she is also an orphan from Little Wing and acts as the girls' older sister. She secretly likes him and supports his efforts to return to school and reassume his student life.
Masayoshi Sawatari (佐渡正義, Sawatari Masayoshi)
Voiced by: Toru Ōkawa
A former priest who is the owner of the Little Wings Orphanage, where the girls live.

=== DragonNuts ===
Kurumi Nukui (貫井 くるみ, Nukui Kurumi)
Voiced by: Rina Hidaka
Kyō's little sister, who usually berates him for his decision not to go to school, but loves to be by his side. She is also a classmate of Jun and the others and is a little jealous of them getting along with her brother.
Koume Ogi (尾城小梅, Ogi Koume)
Voiced by: Kana Hanazawa
Yuzuha Aigae (相ヶ江柚葉, Aigae Yuzuha)
Voiced by: Yuka Iguchi

== Media ==
=== Print ===
Angel's 3Piece! is written by Sagu Aoyama and illustrated by Tinkle. Eleven volumes were released between June 10, 2012, and February 10, 2018, on ASCII Media Works' Dengeki Bunko imprint.

A manga adaptation illustrated by Yuzu Mizutani began serialization in ASCII Media Works' seinen manga magazine Dengeki G's Comic from the July 2014 issue. The first tankōbon volume was released on November 10, 2014; six volumes have been published as of September 8, 2017. A spin-off manga series titled Tenshi no 3P! no 3P!! illustrated by Omiya began serialization in ASCII Media Works' magazine Dengeki Moeoh from the December 2013 issue. The first volume of the spin-off manga was released on July 10, 2015.

=== Anime ===
A 12-episode anime television series adaptation by Project No.9 aired from July 10 to September 25, 2017. The series is directed by Shinsuke Yanagi, with scripts written by Gō Zappa, and the music is composed by Akito Matsuda. Crunchyroll streamed the anime. The series' opening theme is "Habataki no Birthday" (羽ばたきのバースデイ) and the ending theme is "Kusabi" (楔); both songs are performed by Yūko Ōno, Yurika Endō, and Aoi Koga under the name Baby's breath.

No.	Title (Note: All English episode titles are taken from Crunchyroll.)	Original release date
1	"Heart Throbbing for Elementary School Kids!" "Shōgakusei ni Dokkiri!" (Japanese: 小学生にドッキリ!)	July 10, 2017
Kyō Nukui is a shut-in high schooler with a love for music, often posting his music online under the fake name of HibikiP. One day, an anonymous sender wants to meet him at a park, to which Kyō agrees, thinking it to be a middle-aged man interested in discussing music like him. However, the anonymous sender turns out to be three elementary school girls, Jūn Goto, Nozomi Momijidani, and Sora Kaneshiro, who request that he play his music with their band in an upcoming concert. They perform first for him, and despite being highly impressed with their musical skills and vintage instruments, he is still unsure about his decision.
2	"A Desire to Do It Together" "Issho ni Yaritai Kimochi" (Japanese: いっしょにやりたい気持ち)	July 17, 2017
Kyō agrees to help the girls with the concert, but Masayoshi Sawatari, the head of the orphanage where they live, asks him to dissuade them.
3	"The Boy on Hiatus Descends and Flees, and the Girls from the Church" "Teitaisuru Shōnen no Kakō to Tōsō, Soshite Kyōkai kara Kita Shōjotachi" (Japanese: 停滞する少年の下降と逃走、そして教会から来た少女達)	July 24, 2017
Kyō discovers that Jun and the others are classmates of his younger sister Kurumi, but for some reason do not get along well with the other kids at school. He also finds out that his childhood friend, Sakura Toriumi, is also an orphan from Little Wing, and asks him to keep it a secret.
4	"The World is but Rock n' Roll" "Kono Yo wa Subete Rokkunrōru" (Japanese: この世はすべてロックンロール)	July 31, 2017
Kyō and the girls have no success at all in gathering attendants to the concert, and he then decides to return to school and ask for his classmates' help, while suggesting that the girls do the same at theirs.
5	"It's so Fun Taking Pictures of You, Because You Don't Realize How Cute You Are" "Kimi no Sugata o Toru no ga Tanoshiin da. Nazenara Kimi wa Totemo Kawaii no ni Sore ni Mattaku Ki ga Tsuiteinai kara" (Japanese: 君の姿を撮るのが楽しいんだ.なぜなら君はとても可愛いのにそれに全く気がついていないから)	August 7, 2017
The concert is a success, and Kyō and the girls' next step is to gather more public to make a steady income from their gigs. By the suggestion of a friend, Kyō decides to make a PV of them for advertising.
6	"Don't Take the Bassist!" "Bēshisuto o Tsureteku na!" (Japanese: ベーシストを連れてくな!)	August 14, 2017
Nozomi meets her grandfather, who wants to adopt her and take her to England. Kyō and the others decide not to ask her to stay in order not to influence her decision, until Kyō's sister Kurumi gives him a piece of her mind.
7	"Surprise Invitation" "Bikkuri Shōtaijō" (Japanese: びっくり招待状)	August 21, 2017
Kyō is invited along with the girls of Lien de Famille by his online friend Yuzuha Aigae to hold a concert on a resort island, unaware of her true intentions.
8	"The Girl in the Mural" "Hekiga no Bishōjo" (Japanese: 壁画の美少女)	August 28, 2017
Uneasy with Kyō's closeness with the girls, Yuzuha comes up with several ploys against them, just to be exposed by Sakura. When a storm approaches the island, Yuzuha disappears, and after finding her, Kyō discovers her secret.
9	"The Grade School Kids Might've Not Been Able to Save the Drowning God if They Hadn't Gotten There in Time" "Tadoritsuku no ga Osokatta Oboreru Kami-sama o Sukuenakatta Kamoshirenai Shōgakuseitachi" (Japanese: たどりつくのが遅かったら溺れる神様を救えなかったかもしれない小学生達)	September 4, 2017
Kyō discovers that his online friend was not Yuzuha, but Kiryu Yume, and Yuzuha was acting in her stead. When Kiryu decides to cease all connections with Kyō and the others, they decide to find a way to cheer her up.
10	"Totally a Date" "Marukkiri Dēto" (Japanese: まるっきりデート)	September 11, 2017
Kiryu and Yuzuha gain permission to leave the island and transfer to the local school. While helping Yuzuha around the city, Kyō ends up spending some quality time with her, triggering the other girls' jealousy.
11	"Band Battles and Melodies" "Taiban to senritsu" (Japanese: 対バンと旋律)	September 18, 2017
Enraged with how much time Kyō spends with the girls of Lien de Famille, Kiryu decides to form her act with Yuzuha and Kurumi's help and challenge them to a duel. On the occasion, Jun expresses her wish to write music of her own, and Kyō agrees to help her with it.
12	"Can't Help but Love the Music" "Ongaku o Suki ni Narazu ni Irarenai" (Japanese: 音楽を好きにならずにいられない)	September 25, 2017
After finishing their preparations, the time has come for Lien de Famille and Kiryu's band to perform together.

== See also ==
- Ro-Kyu-Bu! — Another light novel series by the same author.
