= Chronos Ruler =

Chinese manhua

- Cover of the first volume as released in Japan by Shueisha on July 4, 2017

時間支配者 Shijian Zhipei Zhe
- Genre: Action
- Author: Jea Pon
- Publisher: OK!COMIC
- Magazine: Manhua Xing
- Original run: May 2014 – present
- Anime television series
- Directed by: Masato Matsune
- Written by: Michiko Yokote
- Music by: Evan Call
- Studio: Project No.9
- Licensed by: NA: Funimation
- Original network: Tokyo MX, BS11, Sun TV, KBS
- Original run: July 7, 2017 – September 29, 2017
- Episodes: 13

Chronos Ruler
- Traditional Chinese: 時間支配者
- Simplified Chinese: 時间支配者
- Literal meaning: Chronos Ruler
Transcriptions
Standard Mandarin
- Hanyu Pinyin: Shí Jiān Zhī Pèi Zhě

Chronos Ruler is a Taiwanese manhua series written and illustrated by Ponjea. It has also been serialized online via Shueisha's digital publication Shōnen Jump+ from March 2015 to February 2018. An anime television series adaptation by Project No.9 aired from July 7 to September 29, 2017.

== Plot ==
The story centers on "Chronos Rulers," those who fight the time-eating demons that appear when people wish they could turn back time. The Chronos Rulers fight a time-manipulation battle against these demons.

== Characters ==
Victo Putin (ヴィクト・プーチン, Vikuto Pūchin)
Voiced by: Jun Fukuyama (Japanese); Jerry Jewell (English)
Victo is a 39 year old man who looks a lot younger as after the supposed death of his wife he made a deal with a Horologue, losing part of his time. That is why he now seeks to recover his lost time. At first he did not believe that Mina is his wife but then begins to suspect that she could in fact be his wife. As Chronos Ruler he is able to control the cards at will, he is also in a UNIQUE position that allows him to use his powers without exhausting his time, due to the curse that the Horologue put on him when making the deal.
Kiri Putin (霧・プーチン, Kiri Pūchin)
Voiced by: Kaito Ishikawa (Japanese); Chris Wehkamp (English)
Kiri is the son of Victor Putin and Mina Putin, he helps his father to recover his lost time. Like his father he did not believe that Mina could be his mother because he remembered his mother like Nana not Mina, but then like Victor he begins to suspect that she could be his mother. As Chronos Ruler, he is able to control water and he is also able to use a sword as a personal weapon. Due to him being the son of Mina, since she is a descendant of Chronos, he will not grow old.
Mīna Putin (ミーナ・プーチン, Mīna Pūchin)
Voiced by: Rie Kugimiya (Japanese); Jad Saxton (English)
She is married to Victor Putin and mother of Kiri Putin, she believed herself dead but due to Victor's treatment she returns to life but like him she loses part of her time. At first she thought that she was only Victor's lover because she did not remember that she was married to him, nor did she remember that Kiri was her son, even though she cared about him. As a Chronos Ruler she is able to control the air. Due to being a direct descendant of Chronos her appearance does not change, even after having her time stolen, and why she looks like a young woman of 18 (although in the manga she looks younger) but then it is discovered that she may not have wasted her time after all.
Blaze (ブレイズ, Bureizu)
Voiced by: Kenji Akabane (Japanese); Austin Tindle (English)
Blaze is 16, but in the manga he is 25, as a child he was a kind child who tried to help others but because his childhood friend was deceived, the villagers they thought that he was pretending to be a good boy, that's why he became the most evil person in the world, even though he is still young who likes to help his friends when necessary, he considers himself as Kiri's older brother, as Chronos Ruler is able to control the fire.
Ice Radar (アイスレーダー, Aisu Rēdā)
Voiced by: Shizuka Itō (Japanese); Monica Rial (English)
Snake (スネーク, Sunēku)
Voiced by: Tomokazu Sugita (Japanese); Brian Olvera (English)

== Media ==
=== Anime ===
On December 17, 2016, it was announced that an anime television series adaptation would be produced by Project No.9. It aired from July 7 to September 29, 2017. The series is directed by Masato Matsune and Michiko Yokote handled the series composition. Hiroya Iijima designed the characters, while Haruo Miyagawa is the prop designer. The opening theme is "RULER GAME" by Fo'xTails while the ending theme is "Jikan wa Mado no Mukōgawa" (時間は窓の向こう側, lit. 'Time is Beyond the Window') by Nagi Yanagi. Crunchyroll streamed the series. Funimation has licensed the series.

| No. | Title (Note: All English episode titles are taken from Crunchyroll.) | Original release date |
|---|---|---|
| 1 | "Existence and Nothingness"; Transliteration: "Sonzai to Kyomu" (Japanese: 存在と虚無) | July 7, 2017 |
| 2 | "Memory and Recollection"; Transliteration: "Kioku to Sōki" (Japanese: 記憶と想起) | July 14, 2017 |
| 3 | "Twilight of the Idol"; Transliteration: "Gūzō no Tasogare" (Japanese: 偶像の黄昏) | July 21, 2017 |
| 4 | "The Concept of Anxiety"; Transliteration: "Fuan no Gainen" (Japanese: 不安の概念) | July 28, 2017 |
| 5 | "Beyond Good and Evil"; Transliteration: "Zen'aku no Higan" (Japanese: 善悪の彼岸) | August 4, 2017 |
| 6 | "Will and Representation"; Transliteration: "Ishi to Hyōshō" (Japanese: 意思と表象) | August 11, 2017 |
| 7 | "The Poverty of Philosophy"; Transliteration: "Tetsugaku no Hinkon" (Japanese: 哲学の貧困) | August 18, 2017 |
| 8 | "Fact and Fiction"; Transliteration: "Jijitsu to Kyokō" (Japanese: 事実と虚構) | August 25, 2017 |
| 9 | "Responsibility and Principle"; Transliteration: "Sekinin to Genri" (Japanese: 責任と原理) | September 1, 2017 |
| 10 | "Conjectures and Refutations"; Transliteration: "Suisoku to Hanbaku" (Japanese: 推測と反駁) | September 8, 2017 |
| 11 | "The Transcendence of the Ego"; Transliteration: "Jiga no Chōetsu" (Japanese: 自我の超越) | September 15, 2017 |
| 12 | "Process and Reality"; Transliteration: "Katei to Jitsuzai" (Japanese: 過程と実在) | September 22, 2017 |
| 13 | "Fantasy Future"; Transliteration: "Gensō no Mirai" (Japanese: 幻想の未来) | September 29, 2017 |
