= Kenka Bancho Otome: Girl Beats Boys =

Japanese anime television series

- Genre: Otome, romance
- Manga

Kenka Bancho Otome: Love's Battle Royale
- Written by: Chie Shimada
- Published by: Hakusensha
- English publisher: NA: Viz Media
- Magazine: The Hana to Yume
- Original run: July 4, 2015 – February 1, 2017
- Volumes: 2
- Video game

Kenka Bancho Otome
- Developer: RED Entertainment
- Publisher: Spike Chunsoft
- Genre: Visual novel
- Platform: PlayStation Vita
- Released: JP: May 19, 2016
- Anime television series
- Directed by: Noriaki Saito
- Written by: Natsuko Takahashi
- Studio: A-Real; Project No.9
- Licensed by: Crunchyroll
- Original network: Tokyo MX
- Original run: April 12, 2017 – June 28, 2017
- Episodes: 12
- Video game

Kenka Bancho Otome: Kanzenmuketsu no My Honey
- Developer: RED Entertainment
- Publisher: Spike Chunsoft
- Genre: Visual novel
- Platform: PlayStation Vita
- Released: JP: July 27, 2017
- Video game

Kenka Banchō Otome: 2nd Rumble!!
- Developer: RED Entertainment
- Publisher: Spike Chunsoft
- Genre: Visual novel
- Platform: PlayStation Vita
- Released: JP: March 14, 2019
- Related media
- Kenka Bancho: Badass Rumble

Kenka Bancho Otome: Girl Beats Boys (喧嘩番長乙女-Girl Beats Boys-, Kenka Banchō Otome; "Fighting Delinquents Girl Leader") is a Japanese anime television series co-produced by A-Real and Project No.9. It aired from April to June 2017. It is based on the PlayStation Vita video game Kenka Banchō Otome, which itself is an otome spin-off of the Kenka Banchō game series. A sequel to the game, Kenka Banchō Otome: 2nd Rumble!! was released on March 14, 2019. All three otome games were announced for release on Nintendo Switch in Asia, with plans to begin releasing them in 2024.

== Plot ==
Growing up as an orphan, Hinako is shocked to learn that she has an older twin brother called Hikaru. Born as a yakuza, Hikaru requests Hinako to switch places with him at Shishiku Academy, an all-boys school overrun with Japan's toughest delinquents, and become the new yakuza boss.

== Cast ==
Characters	Japanese	English
Hinako Nakayama	Hibiku Yamamura	Apphia Yu
Totomaru Minowa	KENN	Austin Tindle
Haruo Sakaguchi	Takashi Kondō	Christopher Wehkamp
Houoh Onigashima	Tomoaki Maeno	Jarrod Greene
Takayuki Konparu	Shouta Aoi	Joel McDonald
Rintaro Kira	Yoshimasa Hosoya	Orion Pitts
Yuta Mirako	Tetsuya Kakihara	Ricco Fajardo
Hikaru Onigashima	Tsubasa Yonaga	Terri Doty
Toshiya Murata	Toshiyan	Alejandro Saab
Kenta Shimamura	kenty	Brandon McInnis
Tora Tanaka	Tora*	Stephen Fu
Sakuya Nakajima	sakuya.	Daman Mills

== Production and development ==
Production of the anime was announced in December 2016. The opening theme song is "Love Sniper" and the ending theme song "Gankō Signal" was performed by Love Desire. Crunchyroll streamed the series. Funimation licensed the series and premiered the dub on May 11, 2017.

== Episode list ==
No.	Official English title Original Japanese title	Original release date	English release date
1	"One Fist"; Transliteration: "Ichigeki Ichie" (Japanese: 一撃一会)	April 12, 2017	May 11, 2017
Hinako Nakayama is an orphan and a martial arts expert, who was living her life in a fuzzy haze when she finds herself attending a new school. While the new outlook she gets from her new surroundings is great, there's a few problems: 1) It is an all-boys school 2) Its student body is nearly 100% punks who are ready to brawl at a moment's notice and 3) She is attending under an assumed identity that ensures the toughest are all going to be gunning for her!
2	"The Road to Conquering Shishiku"; Transliteration: "Shishiku Seiha e no Michi" (Japanese: 獅子吼制覇への道)	April 19, 2017	May 18, 2017
Hinako is now cross-dressing in order to attend the extremely roughneck Shishiku Academy as Hikaru Onigashima. How exactly did she get into this mess?
3	"The Supremely Stoic Punk"; Transliteration: "Saikyou no Stoic Yankee" (Japanese: 最強のストイックヤンキー)	April 26, 2017	May 25, 2017
Hinako reaches the next hurdle in her quest to take over Shishiku Academy: Takayuki Konparu. The only problem? The steely first-year has no interest in fighting her!
4	"Fight In the Rain"; Transliteration: "Ame no Hatashiai" (Japanese: 雨の果し合い)	May 3, 2017	June 1, 2017
Konparu has sent a letter of challenge to Hinako and is now out for her blood. Why is he suddenly ready to fight her? And can Hinako win the fight when she learns the truth?
5	"Show 'Em What You're Made Of! The Great Study Session"; Transliteration: "Otokogi Bakasero! Dai Benkyoukai" (Japanese: 漢魂(オトコギ)魅せろ！ 大勉強会)	May 10, 2017	June 8, 2017
With her control over the first-years secured Konparu and Totomaru head to Hinako's house for a study session to prepare for mid-terms.
6	"The Idol Punk Arrives!"; Transliteration: "Idol Yankee Toujou!" (Japanese: 愛怒溜(アイドル)ヤンキー登場！)	May 17, 2017	June 15, 2017
One of the two top second-years, Yuuta Mirako, is both an idol and a brawler. An upcoming concert at Shishiku Academy brings him into conflict with Hinako.
7	"Concert Brawl"; Transliteration: "Rantou Life" (Japanese: 乱闘来武(ライブ)	May 24, 2017	June 22, 2017
Mirako's disgust at the concept of friendship has Hinako curious, and after hearing about his troubled past from Kira, she decides to help him.
8	"Alas! Such Kind Fists..."; Transliteration: "Aa! Yasashiki Kobushi...," (Japanese: 嗚呼！ 優しき拳…、)	May 31, 2017	June 29, 2017
The other top second-year student, Rintarou Kira, seems to know Hinako's real identity. How does he know, and what will it mean for her conquest of Shishiku Academy?
9	"Passionate Feelings, Determined Fists..."; Transliteration: "Awaki Omoi, Ketsui no Kobushi...," (Japanese: 淡き想い、決意の拳…、)	June 7, 2017	July 6, 2017
Hinako is unsure what to do now that she remembers who Kira is. Will Hinako continue her attempt to take the school over?
10	"Beyond Our Feelings"; Transliteration: "Omoi no Hate ni" (Japanese: 想いの果てに)	June 14, 2017	July 13, 2017
Kira seems to know who Hinako really is, and wants her to give up her conquest of the school. It seems the only way for her to convince him otherwise is to fight him... and win.
11	"The Witch Trial Begins"; Transliteration: "Majo Saiban Kaitei" (Japanese: 魔女裁判開廷)	June 21, 2017	July 20, 2017
12	"Taking On All Comers! Love, Fists, and Best Bros"; Transliteration: "Kenka Joutou! Ai to Kobushi to Mabudachi to" (Japanese: 喧嘩上等! 愛と拳とマブダチと)	June 28, 2017	July 27, 2017
