= Project No.9 =

Japanese animation studio

Project No.9, Inc.
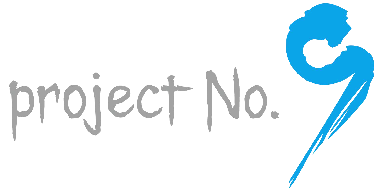
- Native name: 株式会社project No.9
- Romanized name: Kabushiki-gaisha Purojekuto Nanbā Nain
- Type: Kabushiki gaisha
- Industry: Japanese animation
- Founded: February 9, 2009; 17 years ago
- Headquarters: Wagahara, Tokorozawa, Saitama Prefecture, Japan
- Key people: Tomoji Kōjiya (president)
- Number of employees: 30 (As of January 2022)
- Website: www.project-no9.com

Project No.9, Inc. (Japanese: 株式会社project No.9, Hepburn: Kabushiki-gaisha Purojekuto Nanbā Nain), is a Japanese animation studio established on February 9, 2009.

== Works ==
=== Television series ===
Title	First Run Start Date	First Run End Date	Eps	Note(s)	Ref.
Ro-Kyu-Bu!	July 1, 2011	September 24, 2011	12	Adapted from a light novel written by Sagu Aoyama. Co-animated with Studio Blanc.	
Ro-Kyu-Bu! SS	July 5, 2013	September 27, 2013	12	Sequel to Ro-Kyu-Bu!. No co-animating companies.	
Recently, My Sister Is Unusual	January 4, 2014	March 22, 2014	12	Adapted from a manga written by Mari Matsuzawa.	
Momo Kyun Sword	July 8, 2014	September 23, 2014	12	Adapted from a light novel written by Kibidango Project. Co-animated with Tri-Slash.	
Girls Beyond the Wasteland	January 7, 2016	March 24, 2016	12	Adapted from a visual novel by Minato Soft.	
And You Thought There Is Never a Girl Online?	April 7, 2016	June 23, 2016	12	Adapted from a light novel written by Shibai Kineko.	
Kenka Bancho Otome: Girl Beats Boys	April 12, 2017	June 28, 2017	12	Adapted from a video game by Spike Chunsoft. Co-animated with A-Real.	
Chronos Ruler	July 7, 2017	September 30, 2017	13	Adapted from a manhua written by Jea Pon.	
Angel's 3Piece!	July 10, 2017	September 25, 2017	12	Adapted from a light novel written by Sagu Aoyama.	
The Ryuo's Work Is Never Done!	January 8, 2018	March 26, 2018	12	Adapted from a light novel written by Shirow Shiratori.	
100 Sleeping Princes and the Kingdom of Dreams	July 5, 2018	September 20, 2018	12	Adapted from a video game by GCrest.	
Pastel Memories	January 8, 2019	March 26, 2019	12	Adapted from a video game by FuRyu.	
Mini Toji	January 12, 2019	March 16, 2019	10	Related to Toji no Miko.	
High School Prodigies Have It Easy Even In Another World	October 3, 2019	December 19, 2019	12	Adapted from a light novel written by Riku Misora.	
Didn't I Say to Make My Abilities Average in the Next Life?!	October 7, 2019	December 23, 2019	12	Adapted from a light novel written by FUNA.	
White Cat Project: Zero Chronicle	April 6, 2020	June 22, 2020	12	Adapted from a video game by Colopl.	
Super HxEros	July 4, 2020	September 26, 2020	12	Adapted from a manga written by Ryōma Kitada.	
Bottom-tier Character Tomozaki	January 8, 2021	March 26, 2021	12	Adapted from a light novel written by Yūki Yaku.	
Higehiro	April 5, 2021	June 28, 2021	13	Adapted from a light novel written by Shimesaba.	
Miss Shachiku and the Little Baby Ghost	April 7, 2022	June 23, 2022	12	Adapted from a manga written by Imari Arita.	
Love After World Domination	April 8, 2022	June 24, 2022	12	Adapted from a manga written by Hiroshi Noda.	
My Stepmom's Daughter Is My Ex	July 6, 2022	September 21, 2022	12	Adapted from a light novel written by Kyōsuke Kamishiro.	
The Angel Next Door Spoils Me Rotten	January 7, 2023	March 25, 2023	12	Adapted from a light novel written by Saekisan.	
My Tiny Senpai	July 2, 2023	October 1, 2023	12	Adapted from a manga written by Saisou.	
A Girl & Her Guard Dog	September 29, 2023	December 22, 2023	13	Adapted from a manga written by Hatsuharu.	
The Vexations of a Shut-In Vampire Princess	October 7, 2023	December 30, 2023	12	Adapted from a light novel written by Kotei Kobayashi.	
Butareba: The Story of a Man Turned into a Pig	October 8, 2023	February 6, 2024	12	Adapted from a light novel written by Takuma Sakai.	
Bottom-tier Character Tomozaki 2nd Stage	January 3, 2024	March 27, 2024	13	Sequel to Bottom-tier Character Tomozaki.	
Senpai Is an Otokonoko	July 5, 2024	September 27, 2024	12	Adapted from a manga written by Pom.	
Why Does Nobody Remember Me in This World?	July 13, 2024	September 28, 2024	12	Adapted from a light novel written by Kei Sazane.	
Ameku M.D.: Doctor Detective	January 2, 2025	April 3, 2025	12	Adapted from a novel written by Mikito Chinen.	
The Invisible Man and His Soon-to-Be Wife	January 8, 2026	March 26, 2026	12	Adapted from a manga written by Iwatobineko.	
The Angel Next Door Spoils Me Rotten 2	April 3, 2026	June 19, 2026	12	Sequel to The Angel Next Door Spoils Me Rotten.	
Oh Boy, Was I Wrong About Her	July 6, 2026	September 21, 2026	12	Adapted from a light novel written by Yu Hibari.	
The Fledgling Demon Lord's Starter Shop	January 2027	TBA	TBA	Adapted from a manga written by Makoto Morishita.	
My Crush's Crush	April 2027	TBA	TBA	Adapted from a manga written by Sekina Aoi.	
Heir to a Monstermancer	TBA	TBA	TBA	Adapted from a light novel written by Damu Amato.	

=== ONAs ===
Title	Date Released	Eps	Note(s)	Ref.
Cute Executive Officer	January 1, 2021	13	Adapted from a manga written by Odeko Fujii.	
Cute Executive Officer R	July 1, 2023 – September 23, 2023	13	Sequel to Cute Executive Officer.	

=== OVAs ===
Year	Title	Date Released	Note(s)	Ref.
2012	Zettai Junpaku: Mahō Shōjo	August 12, 2012	Adapted from a dōjinshi.	
2013	Ro-Kyu-Bu!: Tomoka no Ichigo Sundae	June 20, 2013		
2014	Recently, My Sister Is Unusual	June 30, 2014	Sequel to Recently, My Sister is Unusual.	
2016	Girls Beyond the Wasteland	March 25, 2016		
2020	Katana Maidens – Tomoshibi	October 25, 2020 – November 29, 2020	Adapted from a video game by Square Enix. 2 episodes.	
2021	Bottom-tier Character Tomozaki	May 7, 2021 – June 2, 2021	Adapted from a light novel written by Yūki Yaku. 2 episodes.	
