= List of role-playing video games: 2002 to 2003 =

This is a comprehensive index of commercial role-playing video games (RPGs), sorted chronologically by year. Information regarding release platform, release type, RPG subgenre, game setting, developers, publishers, and country of origin is provided where available. The table can be sorted by clicking on the small boxes next to the column headings.

This list includes all RPG subgenres, including MMORPGs, Action RPGs and Tactical RPGs. This list does not include MUDs and Roguelikes by default, unless they have an additional RPG subgenre. For standalone lists on these subgenres, see List of MUDs and List of roguelikes

== Legend ==
Video game platforms
DC	Dreamcast	GBA	Game Boy Advance, iQue GBA	GBC	Game Boy Color
GCN	GameCube	LIN	Linux, SteamOS	MAC	Classic Mac OS, 2001 and before
MOBI	Mobile phone	NX	(replace with NS)	OSX	macOS
PS1	PlayStation 1	PS2	PlayStation 2	PS4	PlayStation 4
Wii	Wii, WiiWare, Wii Virtual Console	WIN	Windows, all versions Windows 95 and up	WSC	WonderSwan Color
XBOX	(replace with XB)	XOne	(replace with XBO)		

Types of releases
Compilation	A compilation, anthology or collection of several titles, usually (but not always) belonging to the same series
Early access	A game launched in early access is unfinished and thus might contain bugs and glitches or have some of the content missing
Episodic	An episodic video game that is released in batches over a period of time
Expansion	A large-scale DLC to an already existing game that adds new story, areas and additions and/or changes to the game's mechanics
Full release	A full release of a game that launched in early access first
Limited	A special release (often called "Limited" or "Collector's Edition") with bonus collector's material. Often provided to people who pre-order a game
Port	The game first appeared on a different platform and a port was made. The game is like the original, with few or no differences
Remake	The game is an enhanced remake of an original, made using a new engine and/or assets and thus containing completely new sound, graphics and possibly changes to the story and/or gameplay
Remaster	The game is a remaster of an original, released on the same or different platform, with (usually minor) changes to graphics, sound and/or gameplay
Rerelease	The game was re-released on the same platform with no or only minor changes

Video game genres
Action RPG	Action role-playing game	Dungeon crawl	Dungeon crawl	JRPG	Japanese-style role-playing game
MMORPG	Massively multiplayer online RPG	Monster tamer	Monster-taming game	MUD	Multi-user dungeon
Real-time	Real-time game	Roguelike	Roguelike, Roguelite	Sandbox	Sandbox game
Soulslike	Soulslike	Tactical RPG	Tactical role-playing game	Turn-based	Turn-based game

== List ==
Year	Title	Developer	Publisher	Setting	Platform	Subgenre	Series/Notes	COO
2002 (JP); 2003 (NA); 2004 (EU)	.hack//Infection	CyberConnect2	Bandai	Sci-Fi; Fantasy	PS2	Action RPG	.hack	JP
2002 (JP); 2003 (NA); 2004 (EU)	.hack//Mutation	CyberConnect2	Bandai	Sci-Fi; Fantasy	PS2	Action RPG	Sequel to .hack//Infection.	JP
2002 (JP); 2003 (NA); 2004 (EU)	.hack//Outbreak	CyberConnect2	Bandai	Sci-Fi; Fantasy	PS2	Action RPG	Sequel to .hack//Mutation.	JP
2002 (NA)	Aaron Hall's Dungeon Odyssey	Malfador	Shrapnel	Fantasy				
2002 (JP)	Arc the Lad: Kijin Fukkatsu	Bandai	Bandai	Fantasy	WSC	Tactical RPG	Arc the Lad	JP
2002 (NA)	Arc the Lad Collection	Working Designs	Working Designs	Fantasy	PS1 (Rerel)	Tactical RPG	Re-release, compilation and English translation of Arc the Lad, Arc the Lad II and Arc the Lad III.	JP
2002 (NA/EU)	Archangel	Metropolis Software	JoWooD Productions	Horror, Science Fiction, Adventure	WIN	Action RPG		PL
2002 (EU/NA)	Arx Fatalis	Arkane	JoWood; Dreamcatcher	Fantasy	WIN			FR
2002 (JP)	Atelier Judie: The Alchemist of Gramnad	Gust		Fantasy	PS2		Atelier	JP
2002 (NA)	Avernum 3	Spiderweb	Spiderweb	Fantasy	MAC, WIN		Sequel to Avernum 2.	US
2002 (NA/EU)	Baldur's Gate II: The Collection	BioWare	Interplay	Fantasy	WIN (Comp)		Compilation of Baldur's Gate II: Shadows of Amn and its expansion.	CA
2002 (NA); 2003 (EU)	Baldur's Gate: Dark Alliance	Snowblind	Vivendi	Fantasy	GCN (Port)	Action RPG	Port of Baldur's Gate: Dark Alliance for PS2. Spin-off of the Baldur's Gate series.	US
2002 (NA); 2003 (EU)	Baldur's Gate: Dark Alliance	Snowblind	Vivendi	Fantasy	Xbox (Port)	Action RPG	Port of Baldur's Gate: Dark Alliance for PS2. Spin-off of the Baldur's Gate series.	US
2002 (DE)	Black Isle Compilation	Black Isle	Interplay	Fantasy	WIN (Comp)		Compilation of Baldur's Gate, Icewind Dale, their expansions, and Planescape: Torment.	US
2002 (JP)	Black/Matrix II	Flight-Plan	NEC	Fantasy	PS2	Tactical RPG	Sequel to Black/Matrix.	JP
2002 (JP)	Black Matrix Zero	Flight-Plan	NEC	Fantasy	GBA	Tactical RPG	Prequel to Black/Matrix.	JP
2002 (JP); 2003 (NA/EU)	Breath of Fire: Dragon Quarter	Capcom	Capcom	Fantasy	PS2		Sequel to Breath of Fire IV.	JP
2002 (JP)	Custom Robo GX	Noise	Nintendo	Robotics	GBA	Action RPG	Part of Custom Robo series	JP
2002 (JP); 2003 (NA/EU)	Dark Chronicle; Dark Cloud 2	Level-5	SCE	Fantasy	PS2		Sequel to Dark Cloud.	JP
2002 (JP); 2003 (NA)	DemiKids - Light Version	MIT	Atlus	Fantasy	GBA			JP
2002 (JP); 2003 (NA)	DemiKids - Dark Version	MIT	Atlus	Fantasy	GBA			JP
2002 (NA/EU)	Deus Ex	Ion Storm	Eidos	Sci-Fi	PS2	Action RPG		US
2002 (JP/NA/EU)	Digimon World 3	Bandai	Bandai	Sci-Fi; Fantasy	PS1	Monster raising	Sequel to Digimon World 2.	JP
2002 (DE/UK/NA)	Divine Divinity	Larian Park	CDV	Fantasy	WIN	Action RPG	Series debuts.	BE
2002 (JP/NA/EU)	Dragon Ball Z: Legendary Super Warriors	Banpresto	Banpresto; Infogrames	Sci-Fi; Fantasy	GBC	Tactical RPG		JP
2002 (NA/EU)	Dragon Ball Z: The Legacy of Goku	Webfoot	Infogrames	Sci-Fi; Fantasy	GBA	Action RPG		JP
2002 (JP)	Dragon Quest Monsters 1+2	TOSE	Enix	Fantasy	PS1 (Remake)	Monster raising	Remake of Dragon Quest Monsters, Dragon Warrior Monsters 2: Cobi's Journey and Dragon Warrior Monsters 2: Tara's Adventure.	JP
2002 (NA)	Dungeon Siege	Gas Powered	Microsoft	Fantasy	WIN	Action RPG	Series debuts. Represents Chris Taylor's entry into the RPG market.	US
2002 (NA/EU)	Dungeons & Dragons: Eye of the Beholder	Pronto	Infogrames	Fantasy	GBA	Tactical RPG		
2002 (NA/EU); 2004 (AU)	The Elder Scrolls III: Morrowind	Bethesda	Bethesda; Ubisoft; 1C Company	Fantasy	WIN	Action RPG	Sequel to The Elder Scrolls II: Daggerfall.	US
2002 (NA/EU)	The Elder Scrolls III: Morrowind	Bethesda	Bethesda; ZeniMax Media; Ubisoft	Fantasy	Xbox (Port)	Action RPG	Port of Elder Scrolls III: Morrowind for PC.	US
2002 (NA); 2006 (EU)	The Elder Scrolls III: Morrowind – Collector's Edition	Bethesda	Bethesda; Ubisoft	Fantasy	WIN (Limit)	Action RPG	Rerelease of The Elder Scrolls III: Morrowind for WIN. Sequel to The Elder Scrolls II: Daggerfall.	US
2002 (NA); 2003 (EU)	The Elder Scrolls III: Tribunal	Bethesda	Bethesda	Fantasy	WIN	Action RPG	Expansion to The Elder Scrolls III: Morrowind.	US
2002 (UK)	Enclave	Starbreeze Studios	EU: Swing! Entertainment, Atari Europe S.A.S.U., TopWare Interactive; NA: Conspiracy Games, Black Label Games	Fantasy	WIN, MAC, LIN, XBOX, WII, NX, PS4, XONE	Action RPG		SE
2002 (JP/NA); 2003 (PAL)	Evolution Worlds	Sting	ESP; Ubisoft	Sci-Fi; Fantasy	GCN (Port)		Port and compilation of Evolution: The World of Sacred Device and Evolution 2: Far Off Promise for DC.	JP
2002 (UK)	Fallout	Interplay	Sold Out	Post-apocalyptic	WIN (Rerel)		Rerelease of Fallout for WIN. Series debuts.	US
2002 (NA)	Fallout	Omni	MacPlay	Post-apocalyptic	OSX (Port)		Port of Fallout for DOS. Series debuts.	US
2002 (NA/EU)	Fallout 2	Black Isle	MacPlay	Post-apocalyptic	OSX (Port)		Port of Fallout 2 for WIN. Sequel to Fallout.	US
2002 (NA); 2006 (UK)	Fallout: The Ultimate Collection	Black Isle; 14° East; Micro Forté	Interplay	Post-apocalyptic	WIN (Comp)		Compilation of Fallout, Fallout 2 and Fallout Tactics.	US
2002 (JP)	Final Fantasy	Square; TOSE	Square Enix	Fantasy	PS1 (Port)	JRPG	Port of Final Fantasy for NES.	JP
2002 (JP); 2003 (EU/NA)	Final Fantasy I & II Premium Package; Final Fantasy Origins	Square; TOSE	Square Enix	Fantasy	PS1 (Port)	JRPG	Port of Final Fantasy and Final Fantasy II for NES.	JP
2002 (JP)	Final Fantasy II	Square; TOSE	Square Enix	Fantasy	PS1 (Port)	JRPG	Port of Final Fantasy II for NES.	JP
2002 (JP)	Final Fantasy IV	Square	Square	Fantasy	WSC (Port)	JRPG	Port of Final Fantasy IV. Sequel to Final Fantasy III for SNES.	JP
2002 (JP)	Final Fantasy Legend	Square	Square	Fantasy	WSC (Port)	JRPG	Port of Final Fantasy Legend for Game Boy.	JP
2002 (JP); 2003 (NA/EU)	Final Fantasy Origins	TOSE	Infogrames; Square Enix	Fantasy	PS1 (Port; Re-release)		Re-release of Final Fantasy I & II Premium Package for PS1. Port and compilation of Final Fantasy and Final Fantasy II for NES.	JP
2002 (JP); 2004 (NA)	Final Fantasy XI; Final Fantasy XI Online	Square	SCE	Fantasy	PS2	MMORPG		JP
2002 (JP)	Fire Emblem: Fūin no Tsurugi	Intelligent	Nintendo	Fantasy	GBA	Tactical RPG		JP
2002 (NA)	Freedom Force	Irrational	Crave; EA; MacPlay	Superhero	WIN, OSX	Tactical RPG	Series debuts.	US
2002 (JP/NA)	Forever Kingdom	From	Agetec	Fantasy	PS2		Prequel to Evergrace.	JP
2002 (JP)	Front Mission	Square	Square	Sci-Fi	WSC (Remake)	Tactical RPG	Remake of Front Mission for SNES. Series debuts.	JP
2002 (INT)	Geneforge	Spiderweb	Spiderweb	Fantasy	WIN (Port)		Port of Geneforge for MAC. Series debuts.	US
2002 (JP); 2003 (NA/EU)	Golden Sun: The Lost Age	Camelot	Nintendo	Fantasy	GBA		Sequel to Golden Sun.	JP
2002 (DE)	Gorky 17; Odium	Metropolis	1C Company; TopWare; Monolith	Fantasy; Sci-Fi	OSX (Port)	Tactical RPG	Port of Gorky 17 for WIN.	PL
2002 (DE); 2003 (NA/UK/AU)	Gothic II	Piranha Bytes	JoWood	Fantasy	WIN	Action RPG	Sequel to Gothic.	DE
2002 (JP/NA/EU)	Grandia II	Game Arts	Sega; Enix; Ubisoft	Fantasy	PS2 (Port)		Port of Grandia II for DC. Sequel to Grandia.	JP
2002 (JP/NA)	Grandia Xtreme	Game Arts	Enix	Fantasy	PS2			JP
2002 (NA/PAL/JP)	Harry Potter and the Chamber of Secrets	Eurocom	EA; Warner Bros.	Fantasy	GCN, PS2, Xbox			US
2002 (NA/PAL/JP)	Harry Potter and the Chamber of Secrets	Amaze	EA; Warner Bros.	Fantasy	GBC			US
2002 (NA/PAL/JP)	Harry Potter and the Chamber of Secrets	Argonaut	EA; Warner Bros.	Fantasy	PS1			US
2002 (NA/EU)	Icewind Dale	Black Isle	MacPlay	Fantasy	OSX (Port)		Port of Icewind Dalefor WIN. Series debuts.	US
2002 (NA/UK)	Icewind Dale II	Black Isle	Interplay	Fantasy	WIN		Sequel to Icewind Dale. Black Isle Studios' final CRPG. Uses the D&D 3rd Edition ruleset.	US
2002 (NA)	Icewind Dale II: Collector's Edition	Black Isle	Interplay	Fantasy	WIN (Limit)		Rerelease of Icewind Dale II for WIN. Sequel to Icewind Dale.	US
2002 (NA)	Icewind Dale: The Collection	Black Isle	Interplay	Fantasy	WIN (Comp)		Compilation of Icewind Dale and its expansions for WIN.	US
2002 (EU)	Icewind Dale: Complete	Black Isle	Interplay	Fantasy	WIN (Comp)		Compilation of Icewind Dale and its expansions for WIN.	US
2002 (JP)	Innocent Tears	Global A		Modern; Fantasy	Xbox (Port)	Tactical RPG	Port of Innocent Tears for DC.	JP
2002 (NA)	Jagged Alliance 2: Gold Pack	Sir-Tech	Strategy First	Modern	WIN (Comp)	Tactical RPG	Compilation of Jagged Alliance 2 and Jagged Alliance 2: Unfinished Business.	CA
2002 (JP/NA/EU/AU)	Kingdom Hearts	Square	Square; Square EA; Disney; SCEE	Fantasy	PS2	Action RPG	Features Walt Disney and Final Fantasy characters.	JP
2002 (JP)	Kingdom Hearts Final Mix	Square	Square	Fantasy	PS2 (Rerel)	Action RPG	Re-release of Kingdom Hearts for PS2. Features Walt Disney and Final Fantasy characters.	JP
2002 (JP); 2004 (NA); 2005 (EU/AU)	La Pucelle: Tactics ラ・ピュセル 光の聖女伝説	Nippon Ichi	Nippon Ichi; Mastiff; Koei	Fantasy	PS2	Tactical RPG		JP
2002 (JP/NA/EU)	Lost Kingdoms; Rune	From	Activision	Fantasy	GCN	Action RPG	Series debuts.	JP
2002 (JP); 2003 (NA)	Lufia: The Ruins of Lore; Estpolis Gaiden: Chinmoku no Iseki エストポリス外伝 沈黙の遺跡	Taito	Taito; Atlus	Fantasy	GBA		Spin-off of the Lufia series.	JP
2002 (JP/EU); 2003 (NA)	Medabots: Metabee	Natsume Co., Ltd.	Natsume Co., Ltd.	Robotics	GBA	Action RPG	Medabots	JP
2002 (JP/EU); 2003 (NA)	Medabots: Rokusho	Natsume Co., Ltd.	Natsume Co., Ltd.	Robotics	GBA	Action RPG	Medabots	JP
2002 (JP); 2003 (NA/PAL)	Mega Man Battle Network 3 - White Version	Capcom	Capcom	Sci-Fi	GBA		Sequel to Mega Man Battle Network 2.	JP
2002 (NA/EU/JP)	Might and Magic IX	New World	3DO	Fantasy	WIN		Sequel to Might and Magic VIII: Day of the Destroyer.	US
2002 (NA)	Might and Magic: Platinum Edition	New World	3DO	Fantasy	WIN (Comp)		Compilation of Might and Magic VI through Might and Magic IX.	US
2002 (NA/AU)	Neverwinter Nights	BioWare	Atari; MacSoft	Fantasy	WIN		Designed as essentially a PnP game to be played online with a dungeon master, it demonstrates the potential power of regular user-made content.	CA
2002 (NA/AU)	Neverwinter Nights: Collector's Edition	BioWare	Infogrames	Fantasy	WIN (Limit)		Rerelease of Neverwinter Nights: Collector's Edition for WIN.	CA
2002 (RU); 2003 (UK/NA)	Paradise Cracked	MiST Land South	Buka; JoWood	Cyberpunk	WIN	Tactical RPG		RU
2002 (JP)	Phantasy Star Collection			Sci-Fi	GBA (Port)		Port of Phantasy Star Collection for SAT, minus Phantasy Star IV.	JP
2002 (JP); 2003 (NA/EU/AU)	Pokémon Ruby	Game Freak	Nintendo	Modern; Fantasy	GBA	Monster raising		JP
2002 (JP); 2003 (NA/EU/AU)	Pokémon Sapphire	Game Freak	Nintendo	Modern; Fantasy	GBA	Monster raising		JP
2002 (JP)	Popolocrois: Adventure of Beginnings	SCE	SCE	Fantasy	PS2			JP
2002 (NA)	Pyrrhic Tales: Prelude to Darkness	Zero Sum	Zero Sum	Fantasy	WIN		Released as freeware after a period of several years.	US
2002 (JP)	Riviera: The Promised Land	Sting	Bandai	Fantasy	WSC			JP
2002 (JP); 2003 (NA)	RPG Maker 2	Kuusou Kagaku	Enterbrain; Agetec	Fantasy	PS2	Development tool	Sequel to RPG Maker.	JP
2002 (JP); 2003 (NA)	RPG Maker 3	Run Time	Enterbrain; Agetec	Fantasy	PS2	Development tool	Sequel to RPG Maker 2.	JP
2002 (JP)	Sakura Taisen 4: Koi Seyo, Otome	Red; Overworks	Sega	Steampunk	DC	Tactical RPG	Sequel to Sakura Taisen 3.	JP
2002 (JP)	Sakura Taisen Complete Box	Sega	Sega; Red Ent.	Steampunk	DC (Port)	Tactical RPG	Port and compilation of Sakura Taisen 1 through Sakura Taisen 4.	JP
2002 (WW)	Shifters	The 3DO Company	The 3DO Company	Fantasy	PS2	Action RPG	Direct sequel to Warriors of Might and Magic, part of the Might and Magic series.	US
2002 (JP)	Shin Megami Tensei II	Atlus	Atlus	Fantasy	PS1 (Remake)	JRPG	Remake of Shin Megami Tensei II for SNES. Sequel to Shin Megami Tensei.	JP
2002 (JP); 2003 (NA/EU)	Shining Soul	Nex	Atlus	Fantasy	GBA		Part of the Shining Force series.	JP
2002 (JP); 2003 (NA/EU)	Skies of Arcadia Legends	Overworks	Sega	Fantasy	GCN (Remake)		Remake of Skies of Arcadia for DC.	JP
2002 (RU)	Space Rangers; Космические рейнджеры	Elemental	1C Company	Sci-Fi	WIN	Adventure/RPG/Strategy hybrid.	Series debuts.	RU
2002 (JP/NA)	Suikoden III	Konami	Konami	Fantasy	PS2		Sequel to Suikoden II.	JP
2002 (NA/EU)	Summoner 2	Volition	THQ	Fantasy	PS2		Sequel to Summoner.	US
2002 (JP)	Sunrise Eiyuutan 2 サンライズ英雄譚2	Sunrise		Fantasy	PS2		Sequel to Sunrise Eiyuutan.	JP
2002 (JP); 2006 (NA)	Super Robot Wars: Original Generation	Banpresto; Atlus	Banpresto; Atlus	Sci-Fi	GBA	Tactical RPG	First game in the series to be published outside Japan.	JP
2002 (JP)	Super Robot Wars R	Banpresto	Banpresto	Sci-Fi	GBA	Tactical RPG		JP
2002 (JP); 2003 (CN)	Tales of Destiny 2	Telenet Japan; Wolf Team	Namco	Fantasy	PS2	Action RPG	Sequel to Tales of Destiny.	JP
2002 (JP)	Tales of Fandom Vol.1	Namco	Namco	Fantasy	PS2		Spin-off of the Tales series.	JP
2002 (JP)	Tales of the World: Narikiri Dungeon 2	Wolf Team; Alfa System	Namco	Fantasy	GBA		Sequel to Tales of Phantasia: Narikiri Dungeon.	JP
2002 (JP)	Tomato Adventure	AlphaDream	Nintendo	Fantasy	GBA			JP
2002 (JP); 2003 (NA/EU)	Unlimited SaGa	Square	Square; Square Enix; Atari	Fantasy	PS2			JP
2002 (EU); 2003 (NA)	Valhalla Chronicles	Paradox; Oblivion	Big City	Fantasy	WIN	Action RPG		SE
2002 (JP)	Vantage Master: Mystic Far East; VM Japan	Nihon Falcom	Nihon Falcom	Fantasy	WIN	Tactical RPG	Sequel to Vantage Master V2.	JP
2002 (JP)	Vantage Master: Mystic Far East; VM Japan	Nihon Falcom	Nihon Falcom	Fantasy	PS2 (Port)	Tactical RPG	Port of Vantage Master: Mystic Far East for WIN.	JP
2002 (JP/NA); 2003 (EU)	Wild Arms 3	Media.Vision	SCE	Steampunk	PS2		Sequel to Wild Arms 2.	JP
2002 (JP); 2003 (NA)	Xenosaga Episode I: Der Wille zur Macht	Monolith	Namco	Fantasy	PS2			JP
2002 (TW)	Xuan-Yuan Sword 4: The Black Dragon Dances as the Storm Rages	DOMO Studio	Softstar Entertainment	Fantasy	WIN	Action RPG	Xuan-Yuan Sword	TW
2003 (JP); 2004 (NA/EU)	.hack//Quarantine	CyberConnect2	Bandai	Sci-Fi	PS2		Sequel to .hack//Outbreak.	JP
2003 (JP)	2nd Super Robot Wars Alpha	Banpresto	Banpresto	Sci-Fi	PS2	Tactical RPG	Sequel to Super Robot Wars Alpha Gaiden.	JP
2003 (JP/NA); 2004 (EU/AU)	Arc the Lad: Twilight of the Spirits; Arc: Twilight of the Spirits	Cattle Call	SCE	Fantasy	PS2	Tactical RPG		JP
2003 (NA); 2004 (EU)	Arx Fatalis	Arkane	Dreamcatcher	Fantasy	Xbox (Port)		Port of Arx Fatalis for Windows.	EU
2003 (JP)	Atelier Marie, Elie, and Anise	Gust		Fantasy	GBA (Port or remake)			JP
2003 (JP)	Atelier Viorate: The Alchemist of Gramnad 2	Gust		Fantasy	PS2		Sequel to Atelier Judie: The Alchemist of Gramnad.	JP
2003 (NA)	Baldur's Gate II: Throne of Bhaal	BioWare; Black Isle	MacPlay	Fantasy	OSX (Port)		Port of Baldur's Gate II: Throne of Bhaal for WIN. Expansion for Baldur's Gate II: Shadows of Amn.	CA
2003 (JP); 2004 (NA); 2005 (EU)	Baten Kaitos: Eternal Wings and the Lost Ocean	tri-Crescendo; Monolith	Namco	Fantasy	GCN			JP
2003 (JP)	Black Stone: Magic & Steel			Fantasy	Xbox			JP
2003 (JP/NA); 2004 (EU)	Boktai: The Sun Is in Your Hand	Konami	Konami	Fantasy	GBA			JP
2003 (JP/EU)	Breath of Fire IV	Capcom	Capcom; Sourcenext	Fantasy	WIN		Port of Breath of Fire IV.	JP
2003 (CN)	Chinese Paladin 3	Softstar Technology (Shanghai) Co., Ltd.	Softstar Entertainment Inc. Unistar	Fantasy	WIN	Action RPG	Part of The Legend of Sword and Fairy series.	CN
2003 (NA); 2005 (JP)	CIMA: The Enemy	Neverland	Natsume Inc.	Fantasy	GBA			JP
2003 (NA); 2004 (EU)	Deus Ex: Invisible War	Ion Storm	Eidos Interactive	Science Fiction	WIN, XBOX	Action RPG	Deus Ex	JP
2003 (JP/NA); 2004 (EU)	Disgaea: Hour of Darkness 魔界戦記ディスガイア	Nippon Ichi	Nippon Ichi; Atlus; Koei	Fantasy	PS2	Tactical RPG.		JP
2003 (NA/EU)	Dragon Ball Z: The Legacy of Goku 2	Webfoot	Atari	Sci-Fi; Fantasy	GBA	Action RPG	Sequel to Dragon Ball Z: The Legacy of Goku.	US
2003 (JP)	Dragon Quest Monsters: Caravan Heart	TOSE	Enix	Fantasy	GBA	Monster raising	Sequel to Dragon Warrior Monsters 2.	JP
2003 (JP); 2004 (NA/EU)	Drakengard	cavia	Square Enix; Take-Two	Fantasy	PS2			JP
2003 (NA)	Dungeon Siege	Westlake	MacSoft	Fantasy	OSX (Port)	Action RPG	Port of Dungeon Siege for WIN.	US
2003 (NA/AU)	Dungeon Siege: Legends of Aranna	Gas Powered; Mad Doc Software	Microsoft	Fantasy	WIN	Action RPG	Expansion to Dungeon Siege.	US
2003 (NA/EU/AU)	Dungeons & Dragons: Heroes	Atari	Atari	Fantasy	Xbox	Action RPG		US
2003 (NA/EU)	The Elder Scrolls III: Bloodmoon	Bethesda	Bethesda; Ubisoft; 1C Company	Fantasy	WIN	Action RPG	Expansion to The Elder Scrolls III: Morrowind.	US
2003 (EU)	The Elder Scrolls III: Bloodmoon and Tribunal Duopack	Bethesda	Ubisoft	Fantasy	WIN (Comp)	Action RPG	Compilation of both expansions for The Elder Scrolls III: Morrowind.	US
2003 (NA); 2004 (EU)	The Elder Scrolls III: Morrowind – Game of the Year Edition	Bethesda	Bethesda; Ubisoft; CD Projekt	Fantasy	WIN (Comp)		Rerelease of The Elder Scrolls III: Morrowind for WIN, including both expansions. Sequel to The Elder Scrolls II: Daggerfall.	US
2003 (??)	The Elder Scrolls Travels: Stormhold		Bethesda	Fantasy	MOBI			US
2003 (NA/PAL)	EverQuest Online Adventures	SOE	SOE	Fantasy	PS2	MMORPG		US
2003 (NA)	EverQuest Online Adventures: Frontiers	SOE	SOE	Fantasy	PS2	MMORPG	Expansion to EverQuest Online Adventures for PS2.	US
2003 (UK)	Fallout 2	Black Isle	Sold Out	Post-apocalyptic	WIN (Rerel)		Rerelease of Fallout 2 for WIN. Sequel to Fallout.	US
2003 (CN)	Fantasia Sango	UserJoy Technology	Unistar	Fantasy	WIN		Series debuts.	TW
2003 (JP); 2004 (NA/EU/NZ)	Final Fantasy Crystal Chronicles	The Game Designers Studio	Square Enix; Nintendo	Fantasy	GCN	Action RPG		JP
2003 (JP/NA/PAL)	Final Fantasy Tactics Advance ファイナルファンタジータクティクスアドバンス	Square	Square; Nintendo	Fantasy	GBA	Tactical RPG		JP
2003 (JP/NA); 2004 (EU/AU)	Final Fantasy X-2	Square	Square; Square Enix	Fantasy	PS2		Sequel to Final Fantasy X JRPG.	JP
2003 (JP/NA); 2004 (EU)	Fire Emblem	Intelligent	Nintendo	Fantasy	GBA	Tactical RPG	Prequel to Fire Emblem: Fūin no Tsurugi. First game in the series to be released outside Japan.	JP
2003 (JP)	Front Mission	Square	Square	Sci-Fi	PS1 (Remake)	Tactical RPG	Remake of Front Mission for SNES. Series debuts.	JP
2003 (JP); 2004 (NA)	Front Mission 4	Square Enix	Square Enix	Sci-Fi	PS2	Tactical RPG	Sequel to Front Mission 3.	JP
2003 (JP); 2005 (NA)	Fullmetal Alchemist and the Broken Angel	Racjin	Square Enix	Fantasy	PS2	Action RPG	Based on the Fullmetal Alchemist manga.	JP
2003 (INT)	Geneforge 2	Spiderweb	Spiderweb	Fantasy	MAC, WIN		Sequel to Geneforge.	US
2003 (JP)	Generation of Chaos Exceed: Yami no Miko Rose ジェネレーション・オブ・カオスイクシード 闇の皇女ロゼ	Idea Factory	Idea Factory	Fantasy	GCN	Tactical RPG		JP
2003 (JP)	Generation of Chaos III: Toki no Fuuin ジェネレーションオブカオスIII 〜時の封印〜	Idea Factory	Idea Factory	Fantasy	PS2	Tactical RPG	Sequel to Generation of Next.	JP
2003 (JP)	Giftpia ギフトピア	skip	Nintendo	Fantasy	GCN			JP
2003 (NA/EU)	Gladius	LucasArts	LucasArts; Activision	Fantasy	GCN, PS2, Xbox	Tactical RPG		JP
2003 (DE)	Gothic II: Night of the Raven	Piranha Bytes	JoWood	Fantasy	WIN	Action RPG	Expansion to Gothic II.	DE
2003 (JP); 2004 (NA)	Growlanser Generations	CareerSoft; Atlus	Atlus; Working Designs	Sci-Fi	PS2 (Comp)	Tactical RPG; Real-time.	Compilation of Growlanser II and Growlanser III.	JP
2003 (JP)	Growlanser IV: Wayfarer of Time グローランサーIV	Atlus	Atlus	Fantasy	PS2	Tactical RPG	Sequel to Growlanser III: The Dual Darkness.	JP
2003 (NA)	Harry Potter and the Philosophers Stone	Warthog	EA	Fantasy	GCN (Port), PS2 (Port), Xbox (Port)			US
2003 (NA)	Icewind Dale: The Ultimate Collection	Black Isle	Interplay	Fantasy	WIN (Comp)		Compilation of Icewind Dale, its first expansion and Icewind Dale II for WIN.	US
2003 (NA/UK)	Lionheart: Legacy of the Crusader	Reflexive; Black Isle	Interplay	Fantasy; Alternate history	WIN		Uses the SPECIAL system of Fallout and Fallout 2.	US
2003 (RU); 2004 (NA)	Konung 2: Blood of Titans	1C		Fantasy	WIN			RU
2003 (TW/CN)	The Legend of Sword and Fairy 2	Softstar Entertainment Inc.	Softstar Entertainment Inc.	Fantasy	WIN	Turn-based	The Legend of Sword and Fairy	TW
2003 (JP/NA/EU)	Lost Kingdoms II; Rune II	From	Activision	Fantasy	GCN	Action RPG	Sequel to Lost Kingdoms.	JP
2003 (JP)	Magic Pengel: The Quest for Color			Fantasy	PS2			JP
2003 (JP/NA/EU)	Mario & Luigi: Superstar Saga	AlphaDream	Nintendo	Fantasy	GBA	JRPG		JP
2003 (JP/NA); 2004 (EU)	Medabots Infinity	Natsume Co., Ltd.	Natsume Co., Ltd.	Robotics	GCN	Action RPG	Medabots	JP
2003 (JP/NA/PAL)	Mega Man Battle Network 3 - Blue Version	Capcom	Capcom	Sci-Fi	GBA	Action RPG	Sequel to Mega Man Battle Network 2.	JP
2003 (JP); 2004 (NA/PAL)	Mega Man Battle Network 4 - Red Sun	Capcom	Capcom	Fantasy	GBA	Action RPG	Sequel to Mega Man Battle Network 3.	JP
2003 (JP); 2004 (NA/PAL)	Mega Man Battle Network 4 - Blue Moon	Capcom	Capcom	Fantasy	GBA	Action RPG	Sequel to Mega Man Battle Network 3.	JP
2003 (NA)	Mistmare	Arxel Tribe	Strategy First	Fantasy	WIN	Action RPG		SL
2003 (NA)	Morrowind: Game of the Year Edition	Bethesda	Bethesda; ZeniMax Media; Ubisoft	Fantasy	Xbox (Port; Re-release)	Action RPG	Port and Re-release of Elder Scrolls III: Morrowind for PC.	US
2003 (NA)	Neverwinter Nights	BioWare	MacSoft	Fantasy	OSX (Port)		Port of Neverwinter Nights for WIN.	CA
2003 (NA)	Neverwinter Nights	BioWare	BioWare	Fantasy	LIN (Port)		Port of Neverwinter Nights for WIN.	CA
2003 (NA/AU)	Neverwinter Nights: Gold	BioWare	Atari	Fantasy	WIN (Rerel)		Rerelease of Neverwinter Nights, including the first expansion.	CA
2003 (NA/AU)	Neverwinter Nights: Hordes of the Underdark	BioWare; Floodgate	Atari	Fantasy	WIN		Expansion for Neverwinter Nights.	CA
2003 (NA)	Neverwinter Nights: Hordes of the Underdark	BioWare; Floodgate	Atari	Fantasy	LIN (Port)		Port of Neverwinter Nights: Hordes of the Underdark for WIN. Expansion for Neverwinter Nights.	CA
2003 (NA)	Neverwinter Nights: Shadows of Undrentide	BioWare; Floodgate	Atari	Fantasy	WIN		Expansion for Neverwinter Nights.	CA
2003 (NA)	Neverwinter Nights: Shadows of Undrentide	BioWare	Atari	Fantasy	LIN (Port)		Port of Neverwinter Nights: Shadows of Undrentide for WIN.	CA
2003 (JP/NA/EU)	Onimusha Tactics	Capcom	Capcom	Fantasy	GBA	Tactical RPG	Part of the Onimusha series.	JP
2003 (JP)	Oriental Blue: Ao no Tengai	Red Ent.	Hudson Soft	Fantasy	GBA	JRPG		JP
2003 (JP/NA/EU)	Phantasy Star Online Episode I & II			Sci-Fi	Xbox (Port)	MMORPG		JP
2003 (JP); 2004 (NA)	Phantasy Star Online Episode I & II Plus			Sci-Fi	GCN (Port)	MMORPG		JP
2003 (JP); 2004 (NA/EU)	Phantasy Star Online Episode III: C.A.R.D. Revolution	Sonic Team	Sega	Sci-Fi	GCN	MMORPG		JP
2003 (JP)	Phantasy Star Generation 1	Sega	Sega	Sci-Fi	PS2 (Remake)		Remake of Phantasy Star.	JP
2003 (JP); 2004 (NA/EU/AU)	Pokémon Colosseum	Genius Sonority	Nintendo	Modern; Fantasy	GCN			JP
2003 (JP)	RPG Maker 2003	Enterbrain	ASCII	N/A	WIN	Development tool	Sequel to RPG Maker 2000.	JP
2003 (JP)	Sakura Taisen	Red; Overworks	Sega	Steampunk	PS2 (Remake)	Tactical RPG	Remake of Sakura Taisen for SAT. Series debuts.	JP
2003 (JP)	Sakura Taisen 3: Pari wa Moeteiru ka	Red; Overworks	Sega; Red Ent.	Steampunk	WIN (Port)	Tactical RPG	Port of Sakura Taisen 3: Pari wa Moeteiru ka for DC. Sequel to Sakura Taisen 2: Kimi, Shinitamou koto Nakare.	JP
2003 (JP)	Sakura Taisen: Atsuki Chishio ni	Overworks	Sega	Steampunk	PS2 (Remake)	Tactical RPG	Remake of Sakura Taisen 2: Kimi, Shinitamou koto Nakare for SAT. Sequel to Sakura Taisen.	JP
2003 (JP)	SD Gundam G Generation Advance	Bandai		Sci-Fi	GBA	Tactical RPG		JP
2003 (NA)	Septerra Core (Dual Jewel version)	Valkyrie	Monolith	Sci-Fi; Fantasy	WIN (Rerel)		Rerelease of Septerra Core for WIN.	US
2003 (JP)	Shin Megami Tensei II	Atlus	Atlus	Fantasy	GBA (Remake)	JRPG	Remake of Shin Megami Tensei II for SNES. Sequel to Shin Megami Tensei.	JP
2003 (JP); 2004 (NA); 2005 (EU)	Shin Megami Tensei III: Nocturne	Atlus	Atlus; Ghostlight; Ubisoft	Modern; Fantasy	PS2	JRPG	Sequel to Shin Megami Tensei II.	JP
2003 (JP); 2004 (NA/EU)	Shining Soul II	Sega; Grasshopper	Sega; Atlus; THQ	Fantasy	GBA	Action RPG	Sequel to Shining Soul.	JP
2003 (JP)	Shinseiki Genso: Spectral Souls 新紀幻想スペクトラルソウルズ	Idea Factory	Idea Factory	Fantasy	PS2	Tactical RPG		JP
2003 (EU); 2004 (NA)	Silent Storm	Nival	1C Company; JoWood; Encore	Sci-Fi; Historical	WIN	Tactical RPG	Series debuts.	RU
2003 (EU); 2004 (NA)	SpellForce: The Order of Dawn	Phenomic Game Development	Encore, Inc. (The Order of Dawn): AU: Auran	Fantasy	WIN	Action RPG	SpellForce.	DE
2003 (JP); 2004 (JP/NA/EU)	Star Ocean: Till the End of Time	tri-Ace	Enix; Square Enix; Ubisoft	Fantasy	PS2	Action RPG	Sequel to Star Ocean: The Second Story.	JP
2003 (NA)	Star Wars: Knights of the Old Republic	BioWare	LucasArts	Sci-Fi	WIN, Xbox		Series debuts.	CA
2003 (JP)	Summon Night 3	Flight-Plan	Banpresto	Steampunk	PS2	Tactical RPG	Sequel to Summon Night 2.	JP
2003 (JP); 2006 (NA)	Summon Night: Swordcraft Story	Flight-Plan	Banpresto; Atlus	Steampunk	GBA	Action RPG		JP
2003 (NA/EU)	Summoner: A Goddess Reborn	Volition	THQ	Fantasy	GCN (Port)		Port of Summoner 2 for PS2.	US
2003 (JP)	Super Robot Wars Destiny	Banpresto	Banpresto	Sci-Fi	GBA	Tactical RPG		JP
2003 (JP/NA); 2004 (EU)	Sword of Mana	Brownie Brown	Square Enix; Nintendo	Fantasy	GBA (Remake)		Remake of Final Fantasy Adventure for GB.	JP
2003 (JP); 2006 (NA/EU)	Tales of Phantasia	Wolf Team; Namco Tales	Namco; Nintendo	Fantasy	GBA (Remake)	Action RPG	Remake of Tales of Phantasia for SNES. Series debuts.	JP
2003 (JP); 2004 (NA/EU)	Tales of Symphonia	Namco	Namco	Fantasy	GCN	Action RPG	Distant prequel to Tales of Phantasia.	JP
2003 (JP)	Tales of the World: Summoners Lineage	Namco	Namco	Fantasy	GBA	Tactical RPG	Sequel to Tales of Phantasia: Narikiri Dungeon.	JP
2003 (JP)	Tengai Makyō II: Manjimaru	Red Ent.	Hudson Soft	Fantasy	GCN (Remake)	JRPG	Remake of Tengai Makyō II: Manjimaru for PCE. Sequel to Tengai Makyō: Ziria.	JP
2003 (NA/EU/AU)	Temple of Elemental Evil, The	Troika	Atari	Fantasy	WIN		Uses D&D 3.5 Edition rules, Greyhawk campaign setting.	US
2003 (JP/CN)	Venus & Braves: Majo no Megami to Horobi no Yogen ヴィーナス＆ブレイブス ～魔女と女神と滅びの予言～	Namco		Fantasy	PS2	Tactical RPG; Real-time.		JP
2003 (JP); 2005 (NA)	Wild Arms: Alter Code F	Media.Vision	SCE	Steampunk	PS2 (Remake)		Remake of Wild Arms for PS1.	JP
2003 (JP)	Wizardry: Proving Grounds of the Mad Overlord	Sting	Bandai	Fantasy	WSC (Port)		Port of Wizardry: Proving Grounds of the Mad Overlord for Apple II. Series debuts.	JP
2003 (NA)	Yu Yu Hakusho: Spirit Detective	Sensory Sweep	Atari	Fantasy	GBA	Tactical RPG		US
2003 (JP)	Ys VI: The Ark of Napishtim	Nihon Falcom	Konami	Fantasy	WIN	Action RPG; JRPG		JP
