= List of tactical role-playing video games: 2000 to 2004 =

This is a comprehensive index of commercial tactical role-playing games (Tactical RPGs), sorted chronologically by year. Information regarding release platform, release type, game setting, developers, publishers, and country of origin is provided where available. The table can be sorted by clicking on the small boxes next to the column headings.

== Legend ==
Video game platforms
DC	Dreamcast	GBA	Game Boy Advance, iQue GBA	GBC	Game Boy Color
GCN	GameCube	LIN	Linux	MOBI	Mobile phone
OSX	macOS	PS1	PlayStation 1	PS2	PlayStation 2
WIN	Microsoft Windows, all versions Windows 95 and up	WS	WonderSwan	WSC	WonderSwan Color
XBOX	(replace with XB)				

Types of releases
Compilation	A compilation, anthology or collection of several titles, usually (but not always) belonging to the same series
Early access	A game launched in early access is unfinished and thus might contain bugs and glitches or have some of the content missing
Episodic	An episodic video game that is released in batches over a period of time
Expansion	A large-scale DLC to an already existing game that adds new story, areas and additions and/or changes to the game's mechanics
Full release	A full release of a game that launched in early access first
Limited	A special release (often called "Limited" or "Collector's Edition") with bonus collector's material. Often provided to people who pre-order a game
Port	The game first appeared on a different platform and a port was made. The game is like the original, with few or no differences
Remake	The game is an enhanced remake of an original, made using new engine and/or assets and thus containing completely new sound, graphics and possibly changes to the story and/or gameplay
Remaster	The game is a remaster of an original, released on the same or different platform, with minor changes to graphics, sound and/or gameplay
Rerelease	The game was re-released on the same platform with no or only minor changes

== List ==
Year	Title	Developer	Publisher	Setting	Platform	Series/Notes
2000 (JP)	7: The Cavalry of Molmorth	Namco	Namco	Fantasy	PS2	Real-time.
2000 (JP)	Castle Fantasia 2: Seima Taisen	Studio E-Go!	Studio E-Go!	Fantasy	WIN, DC (Port)	Eroge. Prequel to Castle Fantasia.
2000 (NA)	Jagged Alliance 2: Unfinished Business	Sir-Tech	Interplay	Modern	WIN	Expansion to Jagged Alliance 2.
2000 (INT)	Jagged Alliance 2	Sir-Tech	Titan	Modern	LIN (Port)	Port of Jagged Alliance 2 for WIN. Sequel to Jagged Alliance.
2000 (JP)	Karkurenbo Battle Monster Tactics	Spiral	Nintendo	Fantasy	GBC	
2000 (JP)	Langrisser Millennium: The Last Century ラングリッサーミレニアムWS THE LAST CENTURY	Masaya	NCS	Fantasy	WS (Port)	Port of Langrisser Millennium for DC.
2000 (JP)	Sakura Taisen 2: Kimi, Shinitamou koto Nakare	Sega	Sega; Red Ent.	Steampunk	DC (Port)	Port of Sakura Taisen 2: Kimi, Shinitamou koto Nakare for SAT. Sequel to Sakura Taisen.
2000 (JP)	Sakura Taisen	Sega; Overworks	Sega; Red Ent.	Steampunk	WIN (Port), DC (Port)	Port of Sakura Taisen for SAT. Series debuts.
2000 (JP)	SD Gundam G Generation-F; SDガンダム ジージェネレーション・エフ	Bandai	Bandai	Sci-Fi	PS1	
2000 (JP)	SD Gundam G Generation: Gather Beat; SDガンダム Gジェネレーション ギャザービート	Bandai	Bandai	Sci-Fi	WS	
2000 (JP)	Seireiki Rayblade 聖霊機ライブレード	Winkysoft	Winkysoft	Sci-Fi	DC, PS1	
2000 (JP)	Summon Night	Flight-Plan	Banpresto	Steampunk	PS1	Series debuts.
2000 (JP)	Super Robot Wars Alpha	Banpresto	Banpresto	Sci-Fi	PS1	
2000 (JP)	Super Robot Wars Compact 2	Banpresto	Banpresto	Sci-Fi	WS	Sequel to Super Robot Wars Compact.
2001 (NA)	Battle Hunter	Success	A1 Games	Sci-Fi	PS1	Card battle.
2001 (JP)	Blue Wing Blitz	Square	Square	Modern; Fantasy	WSC	
2001 (JP)	Castle Fantasia 2: Seima Taisen	Studio E-Go!	Studio E-Go!	Fantasy	DC (Port)	Eroge. Port of Castle Fantasia 2: Seima Taisen for WIN. Prequel to Castle Fantasia.
2001 (JP)	Eithéa アイシア	TamTam	Atlus	Fantasy	PS1	
2001 (JP)	Enterbrain Collection: Simulation RPG Tsukūru	Enterbrain	ASCII	N/A	PS1	Part of the RPG Maker line of video game creation suites.
2001 (NA)	Fallout Tactics: Brotherhood of Steel	Micro Forté; 14° East	Interplay	Post-apocalyptic	WIN	Spin-off of Fallout series.
2001 (JP)	Global Folktale	Idea Factory	Idea Factory	Fantasy	PS2	Real-time.
2001 (JP)	Growlanser II: The Sense of Justice グローランサーII	CareerSoft	Atlus	Fantasy	PS2	Sequel to Growlanser.
2001 (JP)	Growlanser III: The Dual Darkness グローランサーIII	CareerSoft	Atlus	Fantasy	PS2	Sequel to Growlanser II: The Sense of Justice.
2001 (JP/NA)	Hoshigami: Ruining Blue Earth	MaxFive	Atlus	Fantasy	PS1	
2001 (JP)	Innocent Tears	Global A		Modern, Fantasy	DC	
2001 (JP)	Sakura Taisen 2: Kimi, Shinitamou koto Nakare	Red; Overworks	Sega	Steampunk	WIN (Port)	Port of Sakura Taisen 2: Kimi, Shinitamou koto Nakare for SAT. Sequel to Sakura Taisen.
2001 (JP)	Sakura Taisen 3: Is Paris Burning? Sakura Taisen 3: Pari wa Moeteiru ka	Red; Overworks	Sega	Steampunk	DC	Sequel to Sakura Taisen 2: Kimi, Shinitamou koto Nakare.
2001 (JP)	SD Gundam G Generation-F.I.F; SDガンダム ジージェネレーション エフイフ	Bandai	Bandai	Sci-Fi	PS1	
2001 (JP)	SD Gundam G Generation: Gather Beat 2 SDガンダム Gジェネレーション ギャザビート2	Bandai	Bandai	Sci-Fi	WS	Sequel to SD Gundam G Generation: Gather Beat for WS.
2001 (JP)	Simulation RPG Tsukūru 95 Value!	Enterbrain	Enterbrain	N/A	WIN	Re-release of Simulation RPG Tsukūru 95 for WIN; Part of the RPG Maker line of video game creation suites.
2001 (??)	Summon Night 2	Flight-Plan	Banpresto	Steampunk	GBC	Sequel to Summon Night.
2001 (JP)	Super Robot Wars Advance	Banpresto	Banpresto	Sci-Fi	GBA	
2001 (JP)	Super Robot Wars Alpha Gaiden	Banpresto	Banpresto	Sci-Fi	PS1	Sequel to Super Robot Wars Alpha.
2001 (JP)	Super Tokusatsu Taisen 2001	Japan Art Media	Banpresto	Sci-Fi	PS1	
2001 (JP); 2002 (NA)	Tactics Ogre: The Knight of Lodis	Quest	Atlus	Fantasy	GBA	Prequel to Ogre Battle: March of the Black Queen.
2001 (JP)	Tear Ring Saga ティアリングサーガ ユトナ英雄戦記	Tirnanog	Enterbrain	Sc-Fi	PS1	Series debuts.
2001 (NA/EU)	Art of Magic: Magic & Mayhem, The	Climax; Charybdis	Virgin; Bethesda	Fantasy	WIN	Real-time. Prequel to Magic & Mayhem.
2001 (JP)	Tir-nan-og: The Forbidden Tower ティル・ナ・ノーグ<ダーナの末裔>	SystemSoft		Fantasy	WIN (Remake)	Remake of Tir-nan-og for PC98.
2001 (JP)	Volfoss	Namco	Namco	Fantasy, Surreal	PS1	
2001 (JP); 2002 (NA/PAL)	Zone of the Enders: The Fist of Mars	Konami; Sunrise	Konami	Fantasy	GBA	
2002 (NA)	Arc the Lad Collection	Working Designs	Working Designs	Fantasy	PS1 (Rerel)	Re-release, compilation and English translation of Arc the Lad, Arc the Lad II and Arc the Lad III.
2002 (JP)	Arc the Lad: Kijin Fukkatsu	Bandai	Bandai	Fantasy	WSC	
2002 (JP)	Black Matrix Zero	Flight-Plan	NEC	Fantasy	GBA	Prequel to Black/Matrix.
2002 (JP)	Black/Matrix II	Flight-Plan	NEC	Fantasy	PS2	Sequel to Black/Matrix.
2002 (JP/NA/EU)	Dragon Ball Z: Legendary Super Warriors	Banpresto	Banpresto; Infogrames	Sci-Fi, Fantasy	GBC	
2002 (NA/EU)	Dungeons & Dragons: Eye of the Beholder (GBA)	Pronto	Infogrames	Fantasy	GBA	
2002 (JP)	Fire Emblem: Fūin no Tsurugi	Intelligent	Nintendo	Fantasy	GBA	
2002 (NA)	Freedom Force	Irrational	Crave; EA; MacPlay	Superhero	WIN, OSX	Series debuts.
2002 (JP)	Front Mission	Square	Square	Sci-Fi	WSC (Remake)	Remake of Front Mission for SNES. Series debuts.
2002 (JP)	Generation of Next; Generation of Chaos II ジェネレーションオブカオスNEXT	Idea Factory	Idea Factory	Sci-Fi	PS2	Sequel to Generation of Chaos.
2002 (DE)	Gorky 17; Odium	Metropolis	1C Company; TopWare; Monolith	Fantasy	OSX (Port)	Port of Gorky 17 for WIN.
2002 (JP)	Innocent Tears	Global A		Modern, Fantasy	Xbox (Port)	Port of Innocent Tears for DC.
2002 (NA)	Jagged Alliance 2: Gold Pack	Sir-Tech	Strategy First	Modern	WIN (Comp)	Compilation of Jagged Alliance 2 and Jagged Alliance 2: Unfinished Business.
2002 (JP); 2004 (NA); 2005 (EU/AU)	La Pucelle: Tactics ラ・ピュセル 光の聖女伝説	Nippon Ichi	Nippon Ichi; Mastiff; Koei	Fantasy	PS2	
2002 (JP)	Sakura Taisen 4: Koi Seyo, Otome	Red; Overworks	Sega	Steampunk	DC	Sequel to Sakura Taisen 3.
2002 (JP)	Sakura Taisen Compete Box	Sega	Sega; Red Ent.	Steampunk	DC (Port)	Port and compilation of Sakura Taisen 1 through Sakura Taisen 4.
2002 (RU); 2003 (UK/NA)	Paradise Cracked	MiST Land South	Buka; JoWood	Cyberpunk	WIN	
2002 (JP)	SD Gundam G Generation: Monoeye Gundams; SDガンダム GGENERATION モノアイ ガンダムズ	Bandai	Bandai	Sci-Fi	WS	Sequel to SD Gundam G Generation: Gather Beat 2 for WS.
2002 (JP)	Super Robot Wars Impact	Banpresto	Banpresto	Sci-Fi	PS2	
2002 (JP)	Super Robot Wars Reversal	Banpresto	Banpresto	Sci-Fi	GBA	
2002 (JP); 2006 (NA)	Super Robot Wars: Original Generation	Banpresto; Atlus	Banpresto; Atlus	Sci-Fi	GBA	First game in the series to be published outside Japan.
2002 (JP)	Tir-nan-og III ティル・ナ・ノーグIII	SystemSoft		Fantasy	WIN	Sequel to Tir-nan-og II for PC98.
2002 (JP)	Vantage Master: Mystic Far East; VM Japan	Nihon Falcom	Nihon Falcom	Fantasy	PS2 (Port)	Port of Vantage Master: Mystic Far East for WIN.
2002 (JP)	Vantage Master: Mystic Far East; VM Japan	Nihon Falcom	Nihon Falcom	Fantasy	WIN	Sequel to Vantage Master V2.
2003 (JP)	2nd Super Robot Wars Alpha	Banpresto	Banpresto	Sci-Fi	PS2	Sequel to Super Robot Wars Alpha Gaiden.
2003 (JP/NA); 2004 (EU/AU)	Arc the Lad: Twilight of the Spirits; Arc: Twilight of the Spirits	Cattle Call	SCE	Fantasy	PS2	
2003 (JP/NA); 2004 (EU)	Disgaea: Hour of Darkness 魔界戦記ディスガイア	Nippon Ichi	Nippon Ichi; Atlus; Koei	Fantasy	PS2	Series debuts.
2003 (JP/NA/PAL)	Final Fantasy Tactics Advance ファイナルファンタジータクティクスアドバンス	Square	Square; Nintendo	Fantasy	GBA	
2003 (JP/NA); 2004 (EU)	Fire Emblem; Fire Emblem: Rekka no Ken	Intelligent	Nintendo	Fantasy	GBA	Prequel to Fire Emblem: Fūin no Tsurugi. First game in the series to be released outside Japan.
2003 (JP)	Front Mission	Square	Square	Sci-Fi	PS1 (Remake)	Series debut. Remake of Front Mission for SNES.
2003 (JP); 2004 (NA)	Front Mission 4	Square Enix	Square Enix	Sci-Fi	PS2	Sequel to Front Mission 3.
2003 (JP)	Generation of Chaos Exceed: Yami no Miko Rose ジェネレーション・オブ・カオスイクシード 闇の皇女ロゼ	Idea Factory	Idea Factory	Fantasy	GCN	
2003 (JP)	Generation of Chaos III: Toki no Fuuin ジェネレーションオブカオスIII 〜時の封印〜	Idea Factory	Idea Factory	Fantasy	PS2	Sequel to Generation of Next.
2003 (NA/EU)	Gladius	LucasArts	LucasArts; Activision	Fantasy	GCN, PS2, XBOX	
2003 (JP); 2004 (NA)	Growlanser Generations	CareerSoft; Atlus	Atlus; Working Designs	Sci-Fi	PS2 (Comp)	Real-time. Compilation of Growlanser II and Growlanser III.
2003 (JP)	Growlanser IV: Wayfarer of Time グローランサーIV	Atlus	Atlus	Fantasy	PS2	Sequel to Growlanser III: The Dual Darkness.
2003 (JP)	Sakura Taisen 3: Is Paris Burning? Sakura Taisen 3: Pari wa Moeteiru ka	Red; Overworks	Sega; Red Ent.	Steampunk	WIN (Port)	Port of Sakura Taisen 3: Pari wa Moeteiru ka for DC. Sequel to Sakura Taisen 2: Kimi, Shinitamou koto Nakare.
2003 (JP)	Sakura Taisen: Atsuki Chishio ni	Overworks	Sega	Steampunk	PS2 (Remake)	Remake of Sakura Taisen 2: Kimi, Shinitamou koto Nakare for SAT. Sequel to Sakura Taisen.
2003 (JP)	Sakura Taisen	Red; Overworks	Sega	Steampunk	PS2 (Remake)	Series debuts. Remake of Sakura Taisen for SAT.
2003 (JP)	Mamanyonyo ままにょにょ	Alice	Alice	Fantasy	WIN	Eroge. Shares the same setting as the Mamatoto series.
2003 (JP/NA/EU)	Onimusha Tactics	Capcom	Capcom	Fantasy	GBA	Part of the Onimusha series.
2003 (JP)	SD Gundam G Generation Advance	Bandai		Sci-Fi	GBA	
2003 (JP)	Shinseiki Genso: Spectral Souls 新紀幻想スペクトラルソウルズ	Idea Factory	Idea Factory	Fantasy	PS2	
2003 (EU); 2004 (NA)	Silent Storm; Операция Silent Storm	Nival	1C Company; JoWood; Encore	Sci-Fi, Historical	WIN	Series debuts.
2003 (JP)	Summon Night 3	Flight-Plan	Banpresto	Steampunk	PS2	Sequel to Summon Night 2.
2003 (JP)	Sunrise World War	Sunrise		Fantasy	PS2	Spin-off of Sunrise Eiyuutan.
2003 (JP)	Super Robot Wars Compact 3	Banpresto	Banpresto	Sci-Fi	WSC	Sequel to Super Robot Wars Compact 2.
2003 (JP)	Super Robot Wars Destiny	Banpresto	Banpresto	Sci-Fi	GBA	
2003 (JP)	Super Robot Wars Scramble Commander	Banpresto	Banpresto	Sci-Fi	PS2	
2003 (JP)	Tales of the World: Summoners Lineage	Namco	Namco	Fantasy	GBA	Sequel to Tales of Phantasia: Narikiri Dungeon.
2003 (JP)	Tir-nan-og IV: King of the Valiant ティル・ナ・ノーグIV 〜紡がれし勇者たち〜	SystemSoft		Fantasy	WIN	Sequel to Tir-nan-og III for WIN.
2003 (JP/CN)	Venus & Braves: Majo no Megami to Horobi no Yogen ヴィーナス＆ブレイブス ～魔女と女神と滅びの予言～	Namco		Fantasy	PS2	Real-time.
2003 (NA)	Yu Yu Hakusho: Spirit Detective	Sensory Sweep	Atari	Fantasy	GBA	
2003 (WW)	UFO: Alien Invasion	N/A	N/A	Sci-Fi		Open source. Spiritual successor to X-COM. Last stable version (2.5) released in 2014.
2004 (JP)	Black/Matrix 00	Flight-Plan		Fantasy	PS1 (Port)	Port of Black Matrix Zero.
2004 (RU); 2005 (NA)	Cops 2170: The Power of Law	MiST Land	Strategy First	Post-apocalyptic, Cyberpunk	WIN	
2004 (JP); 2005 (NA/EU)	Fire Emblem: The Sacred Stones	Intelligent	Nintendo	Fantasy	GBA	
2004 (JP)	Front Mission Mobile	Square Enix		Sci-Fi	MOBI (Port)	Port of Front Mission.
2004 (NA/EU)	Future Tactics: The Uprising	Zed Two	Crave; JoWood	Fantasy	GCN, PS2, XBOX	
2004 (JP)	Generation of Chaos IV 新天魔界ジェネレーションオブカオスIV	Idea Factory	Idea Factory	Sci-Fi	PS2	Sequel to Generation of Chaos III: Toki no Fuuin.
2004 (NA)	Growlanser Generations: Deluxe Edition	CareerSoft; Atlus	Atlus; Working Designs	Sci-Fi	PS2 (Limit)	Real-time. Collector's edition version of Growlanser Generations.
2004 (NA); 2005 (EU)	Jagged Alliance 2: Wildfire	I-Deal	Strategy First	Modern	WIN (Comp)	Compilation of Jagged Alliance 2 and the Wildfire mod.
2004 (JP/NA); 2005 (EU)	Phantom Brave ファントム・ブレイブ	Nippon Ichi	Nippon Ichi; Koei	Fantasy	PS2	
2004 (NA)	Shadow Vault	Mayhem	Strategy First	Post-apocalyptic, Cyberpunk	WIN	
2004 (??)	Shining Force: Resurrection of the Dark Dragon	Amusement Vision	Sega	Fantasy	GBA (Remake)	Remake of Shining Force: The Legacy of Great Intention for GEN.
2004 (EU)	Silent Storm: Gold Edition	Nival	JoWood	Sci-Fi, Historical	WIN (Comp)	Compilation of Silent Storm and Silent Storm: Sentinels.
2004 (EU)	Silent Storm: Sentinels	Nival	1C Company; JoWood	Sci-Fi, Historical	WIN	Sequel to Silent Storm.
2004 (JP)	Spectral Force: Radical Elements スペクトラルフォース ラジカルエレメンツ	Neverland	Idea Factory	Fantasy	PS2	
2004 (RU); 2005 (EU)	Star Wolves; Звездные волки	Xbow	1C Company; Excalibur; Micro Application	Sci-Fi	WIN	Real-time. Characters pilot space ships, but the game features traditional RPG elements.
2004 (JP); 2005 (NA); 2006 (PAL)	Stella Deus: The Gate of Eternity ステラデウス	Pinegrow	Atlus; 505 GameStreet	Fantasy	PS2	
2004 (JP)	Super Robot Wars GC	Banpresto	Banpresto	Sci-Fi	GCN	
2004 (JP)	Super Robot Wars MX	Banpresto	Banpresto	Sci-Fi	PS2	
2004 (JP)	Tales of Tactics			Fantasy	MOBI	
2004 (??)	The Lord of the Rings: The Third Age, The	Griptonite	EA	Fantasy	GBA	
2004 (JP/NA); 2005 (PAL)	Yu Yu Hakusho: Tournament Tactics	Sensory Sweep	Atari	Fantasy	GBA	
