= Summon Night X: Tears Crown =

2009 video game

- Developer(s): Flight-Plan; Think & Feel
- Publisher(s): JP: Namco Bandai
- Series: Summon Night
- Platform(s): Nintendo DS
- Release: JP: November 5, 2009
- Genre(s): Role-playing video game
- Mode(s): Single-player

Summon Night X: Tears Crown (サモンナイトX ～ティアーズクラウン～, Samon Naito X ~ Tiāzu Kuraun ~) is a fantasy role-playing video game in the Summon Night series for the Nintendo DS. It is developed by Flight-Plan and Think & Feel and is published by Namco Bandai in Japan on November 5, 2009.

The game begins in the world of Runeheim as a decade of peace between the empire of Delteana and the kingdom of Celestia is about to end. The player has the choice to play from the viewpoint of either Phara or Dylan, both of which are heirs to the throne of the opposing kingdoms and are childhood friends caught between the impending war.

== Characters ==
Dylan Will Delteana (ディラン・ウィル・デルティアナ, Diran Wiru Derutiana)
Voiced by: Jun Fukuyama
Dylan is the son of Glocken Will Delteana of Delteana.

Phara Mir Celestia (ファラ・ミール・セレスティア, Fara Mīru Seresutia)
Voiced by: Minori Chihara
Phara is the daughter of Novice Won Celestia and princess of Celestia.

Muu-Muu (ムームー, Muumuu)
Voiced by: Tomoko Kaneda

Garrit (ガーリット, Gaaritto)
Voiced by: Soichiro Hoshi

Sotina Roanz (ソティナ・ローンズ, Sotina Rōnzu)

Fang (ファング, Fangu)
Voiced by: Junichi Suwabe

Luga Naga (ルーガ・ナーガ, Ruuga Naaga)
Voiced by: Junko Minagawa

Ellenadita Clevertink (エルナディータ・クレバーチンク, Erunadiita Kurebaatinku)
Voiced by: Rie Kugimiya

Seitz Endorge (ザイツ・エンドージ, Zaitsu Endōji)
Voiced by: Fumihiko Tachiki

Noin Won Celestia (ノイン・ウオソ・セレスティア, Noin Won Seresutia)
Voiced by: Daisuke Kishio
Noin is the son of Novice Won Celestia and prince of Celestia.

Novice Won Celestia (ノービス・ウオソ・セレスティア, Nobisu Wonu Seresutia)
Novice is the king of Celestia, also the father of Noin and Phara, and at some point had taken Delteana's prince, Dylan, under his wing to settle disputes between the kingdoms of Delteana and Celestia.

Glocken Will Delteana (グロッケン・ウィル・デルティアナ, Gurokken Wiru Derutiana)
Glocken is the king of Delteana, also the father of Dylan, and at some point had taken Celestia's prince, Noin, under his wing to settle disputes between the kingdoms of Delteana and Celestia.
