= Daisuke Kishio =

Japanese voice actor, singer and narrator

- 岸尾 だいすけ
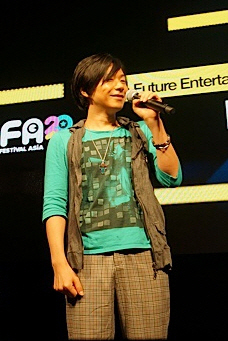
- Daisuke Kishio at Anime Festival Asia 2012
- Born: March 28, 1974 (age 52); Matsusaka, Mie, Japan
- Other names: Dai-chan; Daisaku; Daisaku Sensei; Ganbi Daisaku
- Occupations: Actor; voice actor; singer; narrator
- Years active: 1996–present
- Agent: Aoni Production
- Height: 166 cm (5 ft 5 in)

Daisuke Kishio (岸尾 だいすけ, Kishio Daisuke; born March 28, 1974) is a Japanese voice actor, singer and narrator from Matsusaka, Mie. He changed his given name from 大輔 to だいすけ on June 1, 2007 with the pronunciation and romanization remaining the same. He joined Aoni Production on April 1, 2014. He used to belong to the Tokyo Actor's Consumer's Cooperative Society (Haikyou) and Horipro and worked as an independent voice actor in between switching agencies. His best known roles include the voice of Jet the Hawk in the Japanese version of the Sonic the Hedgehog series, Loke in Fairy Tail, Cabba in Dragon Ball Super, Junta Teshima in Yowamushi Pedal, and Fuyuhiko Kuzuryu in the Danganronpa series. His other roles include Taigong Wang in the Warriors Orochi series from 2 to 4 and Sima Zhao in the Dynasty Warriors and Warriors Orochi series.

At the second Seiyu Awards, he has been nominated for "Best Actor in a Leading role", "Best Actor in a Supporting Role" and "Best Radio Personality".

== Voice acting units ==
Kishio is or used to be, a member of several voice acting units (some may have already disbanded), including:

- 3B with Kanayan (with fellow Kin'iro no Corda cast members Hideo Ishikawa and Masakazu Morita)
- Cluster'S (with fellow Cluster Edge main casts Hiro Shimono, Hiroyuki Yoshino and Jun Fukuyama)
- DAIZ (formerly known as BACKDROP, back-up unit of female voice acting unit DROPS, with Takahiro Mizushima)
- DD (a singing unit, with Daisuke Namikawa)
- Nazo no Shin Unit STA☆MEN (with fellow voice actor friends Junichi Suwabe, Kenichi Suzumura, Hiroki Takahashi, Makoto Yasumura, Kosuke Toriumi and Hiroyuki Yoshino)
- Stella Quintet (with fellow Kin'iro no Corda main casts Jun Fukuyama, Kentarou Itou, Masakazu Morita, Kishou Taniyama and Mamoru Miyano)

== Filmography ==
=== Television animation ===
1996

- Mizuiro Jidai – Myau
- Boys Over Flowers – Male Student C (ep 1)

1998

- Crayon Shin-chan – Young Man

1999

- Kaikan Phrase – Mizuki
- Surfside High School – Yasuhira Nagashima
- Zoids: Chaotic Century – Van

2000

- Kindaichi Shounen no Jikenbo – Makoto Matsuda
- Doraemon – Referee
- Pokémon – Noboru

2001

- Inuyasha – Villager
- Haré+Guu – Wadi, Young Man
- Star Ocean EX – Hooligan A, "Chin", Young Man A
- Zone of the Enders – Larry
- Beyblade – Pedro
- Hikaru no Go – Itou

2002

- Inuyasha – Imp
- G-On Riders – Man A
- The Prince of Tennis – Fukushi Michiru
- Duel Masters – Kyōshirō Kokujō
- Nintama Rantaro – Omo
- Happy Lesson – Chitose Hitotose
- Forza! Mario – Joe
- Pokémon – Saburou
- Detective Conan – Noburo Ikema

2003

- Ashita no Nadja – Thomas O'Brian
- Astro Boy – Jiro
- Atashin'chi – Yuzuhiko's Friend #3
- Stellvia – Kent Austin
- D.C. ~Da Capo~ – Suginami
- Nintama Rantaro – Nintama
- Happy Lesson Advanced – Chitose Hitotose
- Mermaid Melody: Pichi Pichi Pitch – Kaito Domoto, Gaito, Fourth Tachi Brother
- Tank Knights Portriss – Multikokopa
- Rockman.EXE Axess – Tomoharu

2004

- Azusa, Otetsudai Shimasu! – Wataru Hanashima
- School Rumble – Kyōsuke Imadori
- Duel Masters Charge – Kyōshirō Kokujō
- Doraemon – Bonasu
- Transformers: Energon – Kicker
- B-Legend! Battle Bedaman – Enju
- Final Approach – Ryo Mizuhara
- Futari wa Pretty Cure – Shougo Fujimura
- Black Jack – Big Mask
- Pokémon Advance – Satoru
- Bobobo-bo Bo-bobo – Hatenkou, 6/U-kun
- Rockman.EXE Stream – Gyroman

2005

- Izumo: Takeki Tsurugi no Senki – Kagutsuchi
- Okusama wa Maho Shojo – Tatsumi Kagura
- Gaiking: Legend of Daikū-maryū – Nouza, Franklin
- Gunparade Orchestra – Yuki Makihara
- Cluster Edge – Fon Aina Sulfur
- D.C.S.S. ~Da Capo Second Season~ – Suginami
- Doraemon – Navi Robot
- Happy Seven – Kouji Sakagami
- Battle B-Daman: Fire Spirits – Enju
- Futari wa Pretty Cure Max Heart – Shougo Fujimura
- Bleach – Hinagiku
- Pokémon Advance – Kyoutarou

2006

- Kamisama Kazoku – Samatarō Kamiyama
- La Corda D'Oro – Azuma Yunoki
- Hell Girl: Two Mirrors – Kei Takada
- School Rumble: 2nd Semester – Kyōsuke Imadori
- Demashitaa! Powerpuff Girls Z – Takaaki
- Tokimeki Memorial ~Only Love~ – Ryuichi Yagen
- Binbō Shimai Monogatari – Masao Ichinokura
- Yoake Mae Yori Ruri Iro Na -Crescent Love- – Jin Takamizawa
- One Piece – Young Iceberg

2007

- Ayakashi – Yū Kusaka
- D.C. II: Da Capo II – Suginami
- Duel Masters Zero – Kyōshirō Kokujō
- Big Windup! – Miyakawa, Aoi, Ryō
- Dennō Coil – 4423/Nobuhiko Amasawa
- Dojin Work – Ryuichirō Hoshi
- Hitohira – Kai Nishida
- Heroic Age – Meleaguros
- Bleach – Luppi Antenor

2008

- Vampire Knight – Kaname Kuran
- Vampire Knight Guilty – Kaname Kuran
- Gunslinger Girl: Il Teatrino – Pinocchio
- Gegege no Kitarō – Po, Shinji
- Junjou Romantica – Shinobu Takatsuki
- Junjou Romantica 2 – Shinobu Takatsuki
- Tytania – Jouslain Tytania
- D.C.II S.S. ~Da Capo II Second Season~ – Suginami
- D.Gray-man – Howard Link
- Duel Masters Cross – Kyōshirō Kokujō
- Rosario + Vampire – Tsukune Aono
- Rosario + Vampire Capu2 – Tsukune Aono

2009

- Atashinchi – Fish Seller
- Inuyasha: The Final Act – Hakkaku
- Cross Game – Keiichirō Senda
- Guin Saga – Flay
- 07-Ghost – Konatsu
- Tayutama: Kiss on my Deity – Ouryuu
- Tegami Bachi: Letter Bee – Zazie Winters
- A Certain Magical Index – Mitsuki Unabara
- Doraemon – Mecha Jiro
- Dragon Ball Kai – Jheese
- Battle Spirits: Shōnen Toppa Bashin – Nanao "Seven" Watanabe/Galaxy Seven
- Fairy Tail – Loki, Toby
- Yatterman – Sein De Medachi
- Yumeiro Pâtissière – Henri Lucas
- Live On Cardliver Kakeru – Sakeru Yamaga

2010

- Gokyōdai Monogatari – Male Store Attendant
- The Book of Bantorra – Dulltom
- Tantei Opera Milky Holmes – Twenty
- Tegami Bachi: Reverse – Zazie Winters
- Digimon Fusion – Zenjirou Tsurugi, Beelzebumon, Blastmon, GrandisKuwagamon, Mailbirdramon
- Duel Masters Cross Shock – Kokojo
- Durarara!! – Kasuka Heiwajima
- Tono to Issho – Nobuyuki Sanada
- Fairy Tail – Scorpio
- Yumeiro Pâtissière SP Professional – Henri Lucas

2011

- Gintama' – Nakasaki
- Digimon Xros Wars: The Young Hunters Who Leapt Through Time – Dracmon, Gigabreakdramon, Zenjirō Tsurugi, Betsumon, Guard B, MetalTyrannomon, Sephirotmon, Student, Yashamon, Zenimon
- A Certain Magical Index II – Mitsuki Unabara
- Tono to Issho: Gantai no Yabō – Nobuyuki Sanada
- Nura: Rise of the Yokai Clan: Demon Capital – Itaku
- Hunter × Hunter – Hanzo
- Phi-Brain - Puzzle of God – Yuuichi Aizawa
- Beelzebub – Shintarō Natsume
- Rio: Rainbow Gate! – Carlos Tanaka

2012

- Aikatsu! – Hiro
- The Knight in the Area – Leonardo Silva (Young)
- Kamisama Kiss – Kurama
- B-Daman Fireblast – Kreis Reidora
- Is This a Zombie? of the Dead – Takeshi Kurisu
- Tantei Opera Milky Holmes Dai-Ni-Maku – Twenty
- Chōyaku Hyakunin Isshu: Uta Koi – Fujiwara no Kinto
- Doraemon – Chance Manufacturer
- Battle Spirits: Heroes – Renard William Ardley
- Hyōka – Kazuya Tayama
- Phi-Brain - Puzzle of God: The Orpheus Order – Yūichi Aizawa
- Robotics;Notes – Genki Dotō

2013

- Samurai Flamenco – Delta Horse
- Sparrow's Hotel – Misono-kun
- D.C.III ~Da Capo III~ – Suginami
- DD Fist of the North Star – Rei
- Phi Brain - Kami no Puzzle – Yūichi Aizawa
- Blood Lad – Goyle
- Detective Conan – Jun Kouda
- Meganebu! – Maximilian Takahashi
- Yowamushi Pedal – Junta Teshima

2014

- Inari Kon Kon – Macho Man
- Cardfight!! Vanguard G – Jaime Alcaraz
- La Corda d'Oro Blue Sky – Arata Mizushima
- Shōnen Hollywood - Holly Stage for 49 – Ryūnosuke Date
- JoJo's Bizarre Adventure: Stardust Crusaders – Steely Dan
- Pretty Guardian Sailor Moon Crystal – Jadeite
- Marvel Disk Wars: The Avengers – Bucky Barnes
- DRAMAtical Murder – Takahashi
- Laughing Under the Clouds – Kagemitsu Kumo
- Mushishi: The Next Chapter – Isaza
- Yowamushi Pedal Grande Road – Junta Teshima
- World Trigger – Yōsuke Yoneya

2015

- Cardfight!! Vanguard G GIRS Crisis – Jaime Alcaraz
- Kamisama Kiss 2 – Kurama
- Junjou Romantica 3 – Shinobu Takatsuki
- Shōnen Hollywood - Holly Stage for 50 – Ryūnosuke Date
- Tantei Kageki Milky Holmes TD – Twenty
- Diabolik Lovers More, Blood – Azusa Mukami
- Durarara!!×2 Shō – Kasuka Heiwajima
- Durarara!! ×2 The Second Arc – Kasuka Heiwajima
- Makura no Danshi – Yonaga Sagiri

2016

- Dragon Ball Super – Cabba
- Mysterious Joker 3rd Season – President D
- B-Project: Kodou*Ambitious – Ryūji Korekuni
- Danganronpa 3: The End of Hope's Peak High School – Fuyuhiko Kuzuryu
- Tales of Zestiria the X – Rokuro Rangetsu
- Tiger Mask W – Ryū Wakamatsu
- Nanbaka – Elf
- One Piece – Vito

2017

- Yowamushi Pedal: New Generation – Junta Teshima
- Nobunaga no Shinobi – Asakura Yoshikage
- Dragon Ball Super – Nigrisshi
- Clean Freak! Aoyama kun – Hikaru Tada
- In Another World With My Smartphone – Naitō Masatoyo
- Fastest Finger First – Minoru Hanabusa

2018

- Sanrio Boys – Yamato Machida
- Yowamushi Pedal: Glory Line - Junta Teshima
- Junji Ito Collection – Iwasaki
- Tokyo Ghoul:re – Nimura Furuta
- Inazuma Eleven: Orion no Kokuin - Satan Gaul

2019

- B-Project: Zecchō Emotion – Ryūji Korekuni
- Ace Attorney Season 2 - Takamasa Moroheiya
- Zoids Wild Zero - Luc
- Case File nº221: Kabukicho - Gregory Lastrade
- One Piece – Denjiro (Kyoshiro)

2020

- Super HxEros – Rumba

2021

- Heaven's Design Team – Kanamori
- Shadows House – Ryan
- Kemono Jihen – Yoruno

2024

- Sasaki and Peeps – Maximillian
- Tower of God 2nd Season – Yu Han Sung
- Haigakura – Ritekkai

2025

- Tougen Anki – Tsubakiri Momomiya

=== Original video animation (OVA) ===
- Angelique: Shiroi Tsubasa no Memoire First Part (????) – Man
- Angel's Feather I (????) – Naoto Aoki
- CLUSTER EDGE Secret Episode (????) – Fon Aina Sulfur
- Detroit Metal City (2008) – Souichi Negishi
- Doukyuusei 2 (????) – Sanshirou
- New Fist of the North Star (2003) – Young Seiji
- Fist of the North Star: The Legends of the True Savior movie series (2007) – Young Jagi
- Futari no Joe (????) – Joe Akamine
- Garo: The Animation (2014) – Tobias
- Hanayaka Nari, Waga Ichizoku: Kinetograph (????) – Hiroshi Miyanomori
- Happy Lesson THE FINAL (????) – Chitose Hitotose
- Haré+Guu DELUXE (????)
- Haré+Guu FINAL (????)
- Memories Off 5 Togireta Film THE ANIMATION (????) – Shūji Ozu
- Vulgar Ghost Daydream (????) – Mitsuru Fujiwara

=== Original net animation (ONA) ===
- Onmyōji (2023) – Kamo Yasunori

=== Theatrical animation ===
- Blade of the Phantom Master (2004) – Mong Ryong
- Futari wa Pretty Cure Max Heart (2005) – Shōgo Fujimura (Fuji-P)
- Futari wa Precure Max Heart 2: Yukizora no Tomodachi (2005) – Shōgo Fujimura (Fuji-P)
- Hana Yori Dango (????) – Man in the park
- Hurdle (????) – Leon Arisawa
- Naruto: Shippūden the Movie (2007) – Susuki
- RockMan.exe Stream Hikari to Yami no Program (2005) – Gyroman
- Pia Carrot e Youkoso!! - Sayaka no Koi Monogatari (????) – Noboru Kinoshita
- Doraemon: Nobita's Great Battle of the Mermaid King (2010) – Guard
- Hells (2008) - Ryu Kuto

=== Video games ===
- Another Century's Episode 2 (2006) – Tack Capford
- Inazuma Eleven (2008) – Sakuma Jirou
- Dragon Ball: Raging Blast (2009) – Jeice
- Super Street Fighter IV (2010) – Cody
- Dragon Ball Z: Tenkaichi Tag Team (2010) – Jeice
- Dragon Ball: Raging Blast 2 (2010) – Jeice
- Dragon Ball Z: Ultimate Tenkaichi (2011) – Jeice
- Final Fantasy XIII-2 (2011) – Noel Kreiss
- Street Fighter X Tekken (2012) – Cody
- Lightning Returns: Final Fantasy XIII (2013) – Noel Kreiss
- Dragon Ball Z: Battle of Z (2014) – Jeice
- Granblue Fantasy (2014) - Will, Nezha
- Dragon Ball Xenoverse (2015) – Jeice
- Digimon Story: Cyber Sleuth (2015) – Arata Sanada
- Project X Zone 2 (2015) – Hotsuma
- Dragon Ball Xenoverse 2 (2016) – Jeice, Cabba
- Dragon Ball FighterZ (2018) – Jeice
- Jack Jeanne (2021) - Kokuto Neji
- Street Fighter V: Arcade Edition (2018) – Cody
- Xenoblade Chronicles 3 (2022) – Crys
- Arknights (2022) – Corroserum
- Da Capo 5 (2023) – Suginami
- Honkai: Star Rail (2024) - Opal
- Wuthering Waves (2025) - Brant

TBA

- Angel's Feather series – Naoto Aoki
- Aoi Namida – MAN
- Baten Kaitos: Eternal Wings and the Lost Ocean – Lyude
- Bleach: Blade Battlers 2nd – Luppi
- Cluster Edge ~Kimi wo Matsu Mirai e no Akashi~ – Fon Aina Sulfer
- Dark Chronicle – Rococo
- DEAR My SUN!! ~Musuko★Ikusei★Capriccio~ – Satoru Tatsunami
- Diabolik Lovers More, Blood – Azusa Mukami
- Digimon Story: Cyber Sleuth – Hacker's Memory as Arata Sanada
- Dynasty Warriors 7 – Sima Zhao
- Dynasty Warriors 8 – Sima Zhao
- Enchanted Arms – Atsuma
- Full House Kiss Series – Haruta Yamamoto
- Gakuen Heaven 2: Double Scramble (2014) - Kiyotada Jokawa ("Joker")
- Gensou Suikoden V – Kyle, Fuwalafuwalu
- Granblue Fantasy – Will
- Grand Knights History – King Leon
- Gunparade Orchestra Series – Yuki Makihara
- Gunparade Orchestra Midori no Shou ~Ookami to Kare to Shōnen
- Gunparade Orchestra Ao no Shou ~Hikari no Umi kara Tegami wo Okurimasu~
- Hakare na Heart Series – Nanahoshi Himemiya
- Hakare na Heart ~Ta ga tame ni Kimi wa aru?~
- Hakare na Heart ~Kimi ga tame ni Kagayaki wo~
- HARD LUCK – Dauglass Brantley
- Ijiwaru My Master – Eins
- Jak II – Erol
- Kenka Banchou Series
- Kenka Banchou – Shigeru Hachiya
- Kenka Banchou 2 Full Throttle – Tomoya Takeda
- Kin'iro no Corda series – Azuma Yunoki
- Kiniro no Corda 3 — Arata Mizushima
- Kiniro no Corda 4 — Arata Mizushima
- Kohitsuji Hokaku Keikaku! Sweet Boys Life – Shouta Morinaga
- Kuu no Mori ~Tsuioku no Sumu Yakata~ – Yuuri Ayasegawa
- Mana Khemia: Alchemists of Al-Revis – Roxis Rosenkranz
- Memories Off 5 The Unfinished Film – Shuuji Ozu
- Ore no Shita de Agake (PS2) – Nephilim
- Palais de Reine Series – Dietrich
- Palais de Reine
- Palais de Royale
- Prince of Tennis Card Hunter – Michiru Fukushi
- Rockman ZX Series – Prometheus
- SD Gundam G Generation Spirits – Job John, Tony Gene
- Shikigami no Shiro Series – Koutarou Kuga
- Shikigami no Shiro II
- Shikigami no Shiro III
- Shinobi – Hotsuma
- Shōnen Onmyōji -Tsubasa yo ima, Sora ni Kaere- – Hon-u
- Sonic the Hedgehog series – Jet the Hawk
- Sonic Riders
- Sonic Riders: Zero Gravity
- Sonic Free Riders
- Soumatou – Albert, Marco
- Sly Cooper – Bentley the Turtle
- Star Ocean: The Last Hope – Edge Maverick
- Starry Sky – Haruki Naoshi
- Suikoden Tierkreis – Roberto
- Summon Night Series
- Summon Night 2 – Magna
- Summon Night: Swordcraft Story 2 – Magna, Kuuya
- Summon Night Twin Age: Seireitachi no Koe – Mirusaato, Kaui
- Danganronpa 2: Goodbye Despair – Fuyuhiko Kuzuryuu
- Sweet Pool – Makoto Mita
- Tales of Berseria - Rokurou Rangetsu
- Tales of Graces - Segan
- Tenerezza – Indy
- Tokimeki Restaurant – Otowa Shinnosuke
- Trouble Fortune COMPANY☆Happy CURE – Michizumi Kuze
- True Love Story 3 – Minoru Kubota
- Under The Moon – Sena Amamiya
- VitaminX Series – Goro Fuumonji
- Vampire Knight Otome Game for the DS – Kaname Kuran
- VitaminX
- VitaminX Evolution
- VitaminY
- VM JAPAN – Setsuha
- Warriors Orochi 2 – Taikoubou (Taigong Wang)
- Warriors Orochi 3 – Taikoubou (Taigong Wang)
- Wild Arms 4 - Scythe

=== Tokusatsu ===
2000

- Mirai Sentai Timeranger – Serial Thief Dorpa (ep. 41)

2003

- Bakuryu Sentai Abaranger – Bakuryu Dimenokodon (eps. 13 - 50)
- Bakuryū Sentai Abaranger DELUXE: Abare Summer is Freezing Cold! –Bakuryu Dimenokodon

2004

- Bakuryū Sentai Abaranger vs. Hurricaneger – Bakuryu Dimenokodon

2005

- Chousei Kantai Sazer-X – Window General Cyclead

2012

- Tokumei Sentai Go-Busters – Kentateloid (Kenloid (Tateloid Voice by Kanae Oki)) (ep. 43)

2018

- Kaitou Sentai Lupinranger VS Keisatsu Sentai Patranger – Doryun Sanbu (ep. 35)

=== Drama CDs ===
- Aijin Incubus – Fujimaru Senda
- Akiyama-kun – Daisuke Shiba
- Corsair series – Letius 'Leti' Mia Farless
- Damasaretai – Misato Tamura
- Danshi Meiro – Nobuya Ooyama
- Denkou Sekka Boys – Natsui Kodaka
- Diabolik Lovers series - Azusa Mukami
- Goshujinsama to Inu – Mamoru Anzai
- Gouka Kyakusen de Koi wa Hajimaru series 4, 5, 7, 8 – Franz
- Haruyama no Koi – Shino
- Himitsu no Kateikyoushi – Kitai
- Honey Boys Spiral – Hinato Yoshihara
- Kairyuu Gakuen Twins series 1: Scandalous Twins – Kazumi Kitashiro
- Kairyuu Gakuen Twins series 2: Dangerous Twins – Kazumi Kitashiro
- Konoyo Ibun Series 1: Konoyo Ibun – Yamane Akio
- Konoyo Ibun Series 2: Sono no San – Yamane Akio
- Konoyo Ibun Series 3: Kitsune No Yomeiri – Yamane Akio
- Kubisuji ni Kiss ~Hong Kong Yakyoku~ – Korue
- Lip On My Prince – Tomoe Naruse
- Mayonaka ni Oai Shimashou – Ai Kaidouji
- Naito wa Oatsuinoga Osuki series 1 – Kazumi Kitashiro, Crystal-cat
- Naito wa Oatsuinoga Osuki series 2: Naito wa Hageshiinoga Osuki – Kazumi Kitashiro
- Ouchou Haru no Yoi no Romance – Senjumaru
- Prime Time – Shin Kashiwagi
- Punch Up! – Kouta Ooki
- Recipe – Kou Ichihara
- Saa Koi ni Ochitamae – Sakashita Noboru
- Saihate no Kimi e – Ryou
- Samejima-kun to Sasahara-kun – Sasahara
- Sentimental Garden Lover – Shima (Cat)
- Seraph of the End – Mikaela Hyakuya
- Shounen Yonkei
- Sokubaku no Aria – Takato Shibazaki
- Trap series 4: Aiyoku Trap
- Ushi Dorobou – Tokuma Tanaka
- Uwasa no Futari – Narumi
- Vassalord - Barry
- Wagamama Kitchen – Kumaki
- Yuiga Dokuson na Otoko – Neil
- Yume wa Kirei ni Shidokenaku – Ai Ichinomiya
- Yuuransen – Biyori Touzai?

=== Radio ===
Listed in chronological order:

- Starchild Hour – Radio no Stellvia

Hosts: Ai Nonaka, Daisuke Kishio
Broadcast dates: 5 October 2003 to 28 March 2004 (JOQR, etc)

- Ah, Cluster Gakuen!

Hosts: Hiro Shimono, Jun Fukuyama, Daisuke Kishio, Hiroyuki Yoshino
Broadcast dates: 7 October 2005 to 23 June 2006 (Bandai Visual BEAT Net Radio!)

- Full House Kiss 2 Konya Boku ga Soulmate!

Host: Daisuke Kishio
Broadcast dates: 13 January 2006 to 31 March 2006 (Capcom web radio)

- Haikyo Party Radio

Hosts: Daisuke Kishio, Junko Minagawa, Daisuke Namikawa, Sayaka Oohara, Fumiko Orikasa, Junichi Suwabe
Broadcast dates: 2 June 2006 to 14 July 2006 (Bandai Visual BEAT Net Radio!)

- Kochira Munekyun Otome

Host: Daisuke Kishio
Broadcast dates: 2 May 2007 to 31 January 2008 (Animate.TV web radio)

- Sugar Beans Housoukyoku

Hosts: Daisuke Hirakawa, Daisuke Kishio
Broadcast dates: 20 May 2007 to present (Sugar Beans web radio)

- Junjou Triangle ~Iza, Junjou ni Shoubu!!~

Hosts: Hikaru Hanada, Kentarou Itou, Daisuke Kishio
Broadcast dates: 17 January 2008 to present (Animate.TV web radio)

=== Dubbing ===
==== Live-action ====
- Addams Family Reunion – Stevie Addams
- Air America – Pablo
- The Assassination of Gianni Versace: American Crime Story – Andrew Cunanan (Darren Criss)
- Big Fat Liar – Bret Callaway (Taran Killam)
- Blast from the Past – Jason
- Boy Meets World – Jason Marsden (Jason Marsden)
- Burning – Lee Jong-su (Yoo Ah-in)
- Cannibal! The Musical – George Noon (Dian Bachar)
- Confessions of a Teenage Drama Queen – Sam (Eli Marienthal)
- Crazy/Beautiful – Eddie
- Das Boot – Fähnrich Ullmann (Martin May)
- Drive Me Crazy – Dave Ignazzi (Mark Webber)
- Ed – Warren Cheswick (Justin Long)
- Edges of the Lord – Robal
- The Escapist – Joey
- Freaks and Geeks – Bill Haverchuck (Martin Starr)
- The Girl Next Door – Eli (Chris Marquette)
- Glee – Blaine Anderson (Darren Criss)
- Hansel and Gretel – Raven (Sinbad)
- Harry Potter and the Prisoner of Azkaban – Stan Shunspike (Lee Ingleby)
- High School Musical series – Zeke Baylor (Chris Warren Jr.)
- I'll Be Home for Christmas – The Murph-Man
- In Good Company – Carter Duryea (Topher Grace)
- The Invisible – Pete Egan (Chris Marquette)
- The Karate Kid – Billy
- Life with Derek – Derek Venturi (Michael Seater)
- The Mighty – Maxwell Kane (Elden Henson)
- Monster Hunt – Song Tianyin (Jing Boran)
- Outlander – Alex Randall
- Planet of the Apes – Birn (Lucas Elliot Eberl)
- Primeval – Jojo
- The Queen – Tony Blair (Michael Sheen)
- Red Dwarf – Hitler (Ryan Gage)
- Riding the Bullet – Alan Parker (Jonathan Jackson)
- Santa's Slay – Nicolas Yuleson (Douglas Smith)
- The Skulls – Sullivan
- The Sorcerer and the White Snake – Neng Ren (Wen Zhang)
- A Star Is Born – Rez Gavron (Rafi Gavron)
- Supernatural – Craig Thurston (Shane Meier)
- Sweet Sixteen – Pinball (William Ruane)
- Yours, Mine & Ours – Dylan North (Drake Bell)

==== Animation ====
- Dave the Barbarian – Dave
- Gumby: The Movie – Prickle
- Ratatouille – Remy
- Robotboy – Bjorn Bjornson
- South Park episode "Pip" – Herbert Pocket
- Transformers: Animated – Bumblebee
- Transformers: Robots in Disguise – Quillfire

=== Puppetry ===
- Sherlock Holmes – Gordon Lestrade, Stamford

== Discography ==
=== Mini-albums ===
Year	Single details	Catalog No.	Peak Oricon chart positions
2012	BIRTHDAY: Released: March 28, 2012; Label: Victor Entertainment; Format: CD	VICL-63862	19
