= Eternal Poison =

2008 video game

- North American cover art
- Developers: Flight-Plan; Artpresto; Brain-Navi
- Publishers: JP: Banpresto; NA: Atlus USA
- Director: Hirokazu Kawase
- Composers: Takashi Okamoto; Yuki Nakagawa; Kazuma Katagiri; Yuichiro Sato; Yuta Okamoto
- Platform: PlayStation 2
- Release: JP: February 14, 2008; NA: November 11, 2008
- Genre: Tactical role-playing
- Mode: Single-player

Eternal Poison, released in Japan as Poison Pink (ポイズンピンク, Poizun Pinku), is a turn-based tactical role-playing game developed mainly by Flight-Plan, published and produced by Banpresto for the PlayStation 2. The game is a dark fantasy RPG where the player must catch and collect demons called Majin, these monsters can then be used as fellow party members or taken back to the base for other customizations.

== Plot ==
Eternal Poison begins in the Kingdom of Valdia where the demonic realm of Besek has suddenly appeared. This realm is home to demons called the Majin who have captured Valdia's Princess. The King of Valdia then issues a decree for her rescue which brings upon numerous adventurers of dissimilar intentions, the story is told from the perspectives of five key parties as they journey through the realm of Besek to rescue the princess.

== Release ==
The game was released November 11, 2008 in North America by Atlus as a two-disc set, which includes a soundtrack CD featuring selected tracks.

== Reception ==
Reception

Aggregate score
Aggregator	Score
Metacritic	65/100

Review scores
Publication	Score
1Up.com	B−
Destructoid	8/10
Famitsu	30/40
GamePro	3.5/5
GameZone	8.3/10
IGN	3.5/10
PlayStation: The Official Magazine	3.5/5

Eternal Poison received "mixed" reviews according to the review aggregation website Metacritic. In Japan, Famitsu gave it a score of two eights and two sevens for a total of 30 out of 40.

IGN criticized its confusing menus, long loading times during battle animations, and its repetitive soundtrack, while Destructoid praised the looks and the engaging story. 1UP.com called it "a darkly beautiful, but very flawed, gothic/noir strategy-RPG."
