= Summon Night: Swordcraft Story =

2003 video game

- North American box art
- Developer: Flight-Plan
- Publishers: Banpresto (JP); Atlus (NA)
- Directors: Takayuki Kinoshita; Hirokazu Kawase
- Designers: Tomoyuki Murai; Akira Yamamoto; Shintarō Takagi
- Artist: Shinichirou Otsuka
- Writer: Akira Yamamoto
- Series: Summon Night
- Platform: Game Boy Advance
- Release: JP: April 25, 2003; NA: July 25, 2006
- Genre: Action role-playing game
- Modes: Single player, multiplayer

Summon Night: Swordcraft Story (Note: Known in Japan as Summon Night: Craft Sword Story (Japanese: サモンナイト クラフトソード物語(ものがたり), Hepburn: Samon Naito Kurafuto Sōdo Monogatari)) is a 2003 action role-playing game developed by Flight-Plan for the Game Boy Advance. It is a spinoff of the Summon Night series of games. It was first released in Japan in April 2003, published by Banpresto. An English localized version was released in North America by Atlus in July 2006. A sequel, Summon Night: Swordcraft Story 2, was released in Japan in August 2004, and North America in October 2006.

== Gameplay ==
Summon Night: Swordcraft Story progresses through the story on a day-by-day basis. The entire game consists of 10 days, where the player traverses through the town of Wystern and the Labyrinth Dungeon. Each day, more levels of the Labyrinth are unlocked and the player is required to travel deeper to complete mandatory quests. A day normally ends after a tournament or boss battle. During the night, the player can choose whom to spend the night with, which will control the following cutscene. There is a unique cutscene at the end of the game, depending on which character the player spent the most time with in the nighttime sections.

Apart from the story quests, there are multiple side-quests, offered by re-occurring NPCs. Often, they are simple fetch quests. The rewards of these quests are usually enchanted weapon techniques.

One of the main focuses of the game is to forge weapons for fighting. To forge a weapon, the player needs the weapon technique and the materials to create it. Sword techniques are given once every day by Bron and are impossible to miss. Other weapon techniques can also be received from Bron, but the preceding weapon must already have been crafted in order for him to teach the next technique. Also, as with swords, Bron will add to the number of techniques by each day. After the main game is completed, the player will receive techniques by finding them in treasure chests or monsters, and completing special tasks.

Summon Night divides materials into four elements: fire, water, lightning, and wind. Materials can be obtained by sacrificing items or weapons. The amount and type of materials received will depend on the items being used. Also, any weapon sacrificed will only return half of what was used to forge it. When the player has the technique, as well as the materials necessary, they may forge the weapon at their workshop. Weapons can also be enchanted. Depending on what guardian beast was selected, different types of weapons may be enchanted without having to obtain the enchanted technique. Creating an enchanted weapon will require that the original form of the weapon was already forged. In addition, the player must have the proper amount of mystic ores. Mystic ores can be obtained by defeating a special group of enemies, which take the form of possessed armor and equipment. When the player selects to create the weapon again, the option of using mystic ores will be given. Enchanted weapons have increased statistics in comparison to their original form, and they are also endowed by one of the four elements. The weapons that cannot be enchanted by the guardian beast will require the completion of a side-quest.

A battle in Summon Night

Battles in Summon Night take place inside dungeons. They are initiated as random encounters. On the battle scene, the player will be placed into a small side-scrolling area with one to four opponents. They are able to walk, run, jump, guard, attack, summon their guardian beast and use items. Up to three weapons can be equipped, and up to four different items and spells can be placed onto the guardian beast. This must be set up before a battle begins. If no weapon is available or equipped, the player will be forced to battle with a hammer. During the battle, the player can switch freely between their equipped weapons and use any of the selected items and spells. A battle is won when all opponents have either fled or have been defeated. The main dungeon of the game, The Labyrinth, has fifty floors the player will be required to traverse across the length of the game. After completing the game's main story, the player will unlock an additional fifty floor to explore, featuring new materials to craft with, and new versions of previously fought enemies and bosses.

Each character has three statistics for battle. Strength controls the amount of damage they inflict. Defense controls the amount of damage opponents will inflict. Agility controls speed while moving, and jumping height. These stats can be increased by equipment or leveling up. The game also uses a health point system, which will be increased automatically upon level up. Hit points are also gained in varying amounts depending on which stats were selected to increase.

Each weapon also has a score akin to hit points, called duration. Each attack will decrease the duration of the weapon very slightly. If duration of a weapon hits zero, the weapon will break and will no longer be usable. When a weapon breaks, it leaves behind a weapon shard and cannot be restored. Duration is refilled after every battle. The rate which a weapon's duration decreases is inversely proportional to the weapon's TEC score. TEC can be increased by fighting with the weapon more often.

== Plot ==
Shintetsu, the Craftlord of Iron (one of the seven Craftlords), gave up his life to protect his wife Amariss, their child, and the whole of Wystern, and was honored as a hero for his sacrifice. Three years later, the remaining Craftlords organized a tournament to replace the role of Craftlord of Iron. The player takes on the role of the child of Shintetsu, and fights to earn the title in honor of their father. However, the foreign nation of Deigleya have plans of their own, as well as a thousand-year-old forbidden secret that was the truth behind the tournament.

The child of Shintetsu fights through the tournament and wins every match, however, strange natural disasters are affecting nearby settlements, and earthquakes are prevalent throughout Wystern. A mysterious figure follows the child of Shintetsu throughout their journey, and eventually presents them with the Western Sword. The Western Sword was once used to seal a great evil, but the player character becomes entrusted with the weapon once the seal became ineffective. Before the tournament can be concluded, the player learns of a building unrest among the craftlords, and discovers Lubert, Craftlord of Amber, and Ureksa, Craftlord of Jade, are attempting to harness the power of the destructive spirit Parista, and have struck a deal with the neighboring warfaring nation of Deigleya in exchange for sharing control of the beast.

It is later discovered that Ureksa was the brother to the former Craftlord of Jade, Rumari, and it was because of Rumari that Parista had accidentally been awoken three years ago. The Western Sword, along with the Eastern and Northern Swords, were crafted by Shintetsu in order to seal Parista once more, but upon learning these three swords would be ineffective, he poured his own soul into a fourth sword, the Southern Sword, and sacrificed himself in the process. The player learns that the tournament in order to take the place of the Craftlord of Iron was simply a distraction for the populace while the Craftlord circle fought amongst themselves for a plan of action in dealing with the beast of destruction, Parista. While Parista was the spirit of fire, the spirit Kuhrya was the spirit of ice and the polar opposite of Parista, and guarded the Southern blade until the child of Shintetsu would claim it and send Parista back into the spirit world. Upon gaining the final blade, the player enters the final battle with the spirit Parista, and fulfills his/her destiny. While the tournament was simply a formality, the player earns his/her place as the Craftlord of Iron and saves the world from destruction.

== Characters ==
- Cleru (クリュウ, Kuryuu) and Pratty (プラティ, Purati): The respective main male and female playable character of the game. They have a dream of becoming a Craftlord like their father, who died 3 years earlier. Now training with their master, the Craftknight Bron. Their father was one of the 7 Craftlords, the Craftlord of Iron - Shintetsu. Due to his title, he had great pressure on him but that was also the source of his strength. Following their father's footsteps, they realize how they must protect those precious to them.

=== Guardian Beasts ===
Summon Night: Swordcraft Story features one of four "Guardian Beasts" that assist the hero with magic and items during battle. A Guardian Beast is acquired at the beginning of the game, where the player answers a series of questions that determine which beast they get. The beast is identified as the same one Shintetsu had, no matter which is received. The four beasts are:

- Sugar (シュガレット, Shugaretto) is a fairy type creature who is intent on marrying her master, regardless of gender, she still kisses/makes out with the female character regardless. Her full name is Sugarette, and she is the princess of the "Spirit World" Sapureth. She falls in love easily, and can be very jealous of others. She specializes in water type spells, and has a bonus in healing.
- Rasho (ラショウ, Rashō) is an oni type. He is the "demon king" of the "Oni World" Silturn. He is very respectful of the hero's mom, and has a bad mouth, though that is just to hide his shyness. He specializes in fire spells.
- Zantek (ザンテック, Zantekku) is a mechanoid type who originally came from the "Machina World" Loreilal. Zantek speaks in stars, literally similar to R2-D2. His master can understand him despite this. Being a machine, he specializes in electric spells.
- Kutty (クッティ, Kutti) is a beast type, who makes his home in the "Phantom Beast World," Maetropa. He has a hard time being with humans other than his master. He specializes in wind spells. Kutty only speaks his name.

=== Other characters ===
- Sanary (サナレ, Sanare): Sanary belongs to the Silver Guild which many of the other characters as well as the heroes belong to. She cares very much for her sister. She has a dream of becoming the best woman in the City of Swords. However, she becomes jealous once she sees the main character ascending faster than she ever could. Sanary likes using swords.
- Razzy (ラジィ): Razzy is Bron's niece. Early in the game, the main character is given the task of finding Razzy, who once said she became lost in the Labyrinth. Razzy hopes to become Craftlord for one thing only: to fill Wystern with flowers. Razzy likes to use Knuckles.
- Varil (ヴァリラ, Varira): Varil is the heir of the Gold Guild. Although he is called a genius child and considers himself above most people, his arrogance hasn't reached the level where he refuses to admit he can make mistakes. His delusions of his superiority take a severe blow when he is beaten by the main character. His preferred weapon is the spear.
- Sakuro (サクロ, Sakuro): Sakuro was once Shintetsu's student, who fought alongside him in protecting Wystern.

== Reception ==
Reception

Aggregate score
Aggregator	Score
Metacritic	77 of 100

Review scores
Publication	Score
Famitsu	32 of 40
Game Informer	7 of 10
GamePro	3.75 of 5
GameSpot	7.4 of 10
GameSpy	3.5 of 5
IGN	8 of 10
Nintendo Power	8 of 10
X-Play	4 of 5
411Mania	8.5 of 10

The game received "generally favourable reviews" according to the review aggregation website Metacritic, receiving an average score of 77 out of 100.

In Japan, Famitsu gave the game a score of 32 out of 40. IGN's Mark Bozon reviewed the game positively, praising its replay value in regards to the game's weapon forging and its "huge focus on entertaining battles" makes it a must-play for RPG fans, whilst noting its simplistic story and dated graphics.

== Sequels ==
The Swordcraft Story sub-series would receive two sequels; Summon Night: Swordcraft Story 2 released in August 2004 in Japan, and in October 2006 in North America; and a third title, Summon Night Swordcraft Story 3: Stone of Beginnings, which was released in Japan in December 2005, but was never translated and released overseas.
