= Sacred Blaze =

2009 video game

- Developer(s): Flight-Plan
- Publisher(s): Flight-Plan
- Platform(s): PlayStation 2
- Release: JP: February 19, 2009
- Genre(s): Tactical role-playing game
- Mode(s): Single-player

Sacred Blaze (セイクリッドブレイズ) is a tactical role-playing game by Flight-Plan for the Sony PlayStation 2 system. It is the second self-published game by Flight-Plan after 2007's Dragon Shadow Spell. In Sacred Blaze, the player assumes the role of God and has the ability to bestow various player characters with abilities to use in combat.

== Reception ==
Sacred Blaze was given a 31 out of 40 by Famitsu magazine. It was the 8th best-selling game in Japan during its release week at 18,000 copies.
