= RPG Maker 2 =

- Developer(s): Kuusou Kagaku
- Publisher(s): JP: Enterbrain; NA: Agetec
- Composer(s): Hayato Matsuo
- Series: RPG Maker
- Platform(s): PlayStation 2 PlayStation 3 (HD)
- Release: JP: August 8, 2002; NA: October 24, 2003
- Genre(s): Role-playing
- Mode(s): Single-player

RPG Maker 2 (RPGツクール5; RPG Tsukūru 5) is the third PlayStation version of the RPG Maker series, following the original RPG Maker (and the Japan-only RPG Tsukūru 4), the first version of the series to be released for the PlayStation 2 and the overall fifth installment for home consoles. The game lets players write their own stories and uses 3D models.

== Features ==
RPG Maker 2 was the first console RPG Maker to feature full 3D graphics. It was also the first one that allowed players to move in any direction by manipulating the analog stick, but the graphical quality of the game suffered during movement, providing a "blur" effect. The game uses super-deformed character models outside of battle, with somewhat more realistic but still stylized models in battle.

Because RPG Maker 2 used 3D graphics instead of 2D, programs like the Anime Maker for RPG Maker were not included in RPG Maker 2. Instead, RPG Maker 2 uses Picture Paradise, software that allows the user to incorporate digital photos into the game. The PlayStation 2 USB port also allows the use of a USB keyboard, speeding up the process of writing text.

Like other game-making programs, RPG Maker 2 gives the ability to create different events, drive cutscenes, construct boss battles, and add various effects (activities' execution is tied to pre-generated scripts, as in most programming languages). The game also includes a real-time system that allowed changes in time and weather, letting the creator design time-specific events.

The musical score of RPG Maker 2 contains a small collection of samples. Users also have the ability to create their own music tracks if needed.

RPG Maker 2 contains the developers' pre-created sample game called FuMa to showcase an example of a fully completed game built with the software.

== Reception ==
The game was received well by fans for its "dedication needed to master". RPG Maker 2 has a rank of 65 out of a 100 on Metacritic.
