= Summon Night Swordcraft Story 3: Stone of Beginnings =

2005 video game

- Developer: Flight-Plan
- Publisher: Banpresto
- Directors: Takayuki Kinoshita; Hirokazu Kawase
- Designer: Tomoyuki Murai
- Artist: Shinichirou Otsuka
- Writer: Akira Yamamoto
- Series: Summon Night
- Platform: Game Boy Advance
- Release: JP: December 8, 2005
- Genre: Action role-playing game
- Modes: Single player, multiplayer

Summon Night Swordcraft Story 3: Stone of Beginnings (サモンナイト クラフトソード物語 はじまりの石, Samon Naito Kurafutosōdo Monogatari Hajimari no Ishi) is an action role-playing game developed by Flight-Plan for the Game Boy Advance. It is part of the Summon Night series of games and the sequel to Summon Night: Swordcraft Story 2. Unlike the previous two games, Stone of Beginnings was not released outside of Japan. It was released in Japan on December 8, 2005.

== Gameplay ==
Summon Night Swordcraft Story 3: Stone of Beginnings introduces players to creating arrows. However, this new method drains the duration of the new weapon. Ability to play as partner summon, who have their own set of skills in battle, and they also have a Super Form, similar to the Mono Shift from Swordcraft Story 2. New monsters also appear that are resistant to the main character's attack, but are weak against partner summon's attacks.

== Plot ==
The protagonist was the Craftknight apprentice of Rob and his partner, the summon beast V.E. However, one day they got separated, and Rob was killed by a summon beast, making V.E the protagonist's new master. Since then, the protagonist has been looked down upon as V.E was now a Stray Summon and his/her new boss at the same time.

Certain day, an unknown summon beast appears at their workshop and injures V.E, making the main character angry. After chasing the summon beast, he/she meets a mysterious girl named Murno, and after saving her from Bostaph's men, he noticed that the summon beast was Murno's guardian beast. Afterwards, as an apology for the trouble caused, Murno would have to live with them, helping V.E with the house chores; her guardian beast would become the protagonist's partner, and the protagonist makes a vow to protect Murno with the help of his/her new partner. Unknowingly, the protagonist had just become involved in events that would threaten the world of Lyndbaum.

== Characters ==
=== Protagonist ===
- Ritchburn (リッチバーン, Ricchibān): The male lead.
- Rifmonica (リフモニカ, Rifumonika): The female lead.

=== Partners ===
- Run-Dor (ランドル, Randoru): A machine from the mechanoid world of Loreilal. He is the Power Type Guardian Beast; he has the most destructive and most expensive attacks. He also has a strong defense, but is the slowest of the four. His primary magic is lightning, and his special spell can restore a weapon's durability.
- Enzi (エンジ, Enji): A demon from the world of Silturn, which resembles feudal Japan and is full of monsters and demons. He is the Speed Type Guardian Beast. He is the fastest, but his special attacks tend to be the weakest. His primary magic is fire.
- Killfith (キルフィス, Kirufisu): A spirit from the world of Sapureth, where angels and demons dwell. He is the Aviation Type Guardian Beast. He is the only one who can fly, although he is physically the weakest. His primary magic is water, and his special spell is revival.
- Rufeel (ルフィール, Rufīru): A beast creature from the world of Maetropa, which is full of illusions and fantasies. She is the Balance Type Guardian Beast. Her abilities are very well-rounded, although her magical power is the lowest. Her primary magic is wind.

=== Secondary Characters ===
- Murno (ミューノ, Myuuno): A mysterious girl who is familiar with the Guardian Beast, whoever it may be. She is sweet and apologetic, but knows how to stand her ground.
- V.E (ヴィー, Vii): The main character's Craftknight teacher since Master Rob died, and also a Summon Creature who acts as his/her elder sister.
- Jade (ジェイド, Jeido): A former partner of Rob's and a friend of V.E's. Takes on the role of a big brother to the main character.
- Lemmy (レミィ, Remii): A sometimes-rival of the main character with a curt, sophisticated exterior. He works at Master Bostaph's workshop.
- Tier (ティエ, Tie): The daughter of a pair of innkeepers in the town next to the village where the main character is from. She is obsessed with money.

== Reception ==
Reception

Review score
Publication	Score
Famitsu	34/40
