= Summon Night: Swordcraft Story 2 =

2004 video game

- North American box art
- Developer: Flight-Plan
- Publishers: Banpresto (JP); Atlus (NA)
- Directors: Takayuki Kinoshita; Hirokazu Kawase
- Designers: Tomoyuki Murai; Akinori Sano
- Artist: Shinichirou Otsuka
- Writer: Akira Yamamoto
- Series: Summon Night
- Platform: Game Boy Advance
- Release: JP: August 20, 2004; NA: October 17, 2006
- Genre: Action role-playing game
- Mode: Single player

Summon Night: Swordcraft Story 2 (Note: Known in Japan as Summon Night: Craft Sword Story 2 (Japanese: サモンナイト クラフトソード物語2(ものがたりツー), Hepburn: Samon Naito Kurafuto Sōdo Monogatari Tsū)) is a 2004 action role-playing game developed by Flight-Plan for the Game Boy Advance. It is part of the Summon Night series of games, and is the sequel to Summon Night: Swordcraft Story. The game was first released in Japan by Banpresto in August 2004, and in North America by Atlus in October 2006. The game received generally favorable reviews. It was followed by Summon Night Swordcraft Story 3: Stone of Beginnings, released in December 2005.

== Gameplay ==
The player explores the world from a top-down perspective. In areas containing enemies, groups of foes will randomly appear to confront the player, switching the game to combat mode. A variety of objects are placed in the areas that the player explores. The player may interact with these objects by striking them with a weapon. Most of these objects are breakable, and the player will randomly obtain helpful items from them. These objects will reappear once the player leaves the area and returns. There are also normal chests, which contain a specific item and can only be obtained once. Different weapon types also have unique uses, such as the ability of knuckles to move boulders, drills to break down walls, spears to obtain items from trees, swords to cut off large grass, axes to destroy stumps, and the character's own hammer to push buttons located on the ground or the floor. Proper use of weapon types is needed to solve the game's puzzles.

A battle in Summon Night 2

Battles in Summon Night: Swordcraft Story 2 are 2D sidescrolling affairs. All action takes place in real-time. Players may have up to three weapons equipped and may switch between the three at will during a fight. Players may also choose from a pre-selected set of spells and items to use as well. As the player fights, the durability of their equipped weapon will go down. When durability is fully depleted, the weapon breaks and is not usable until repaired. If the player has no more usable weapons equipped, then the player is forced to switch to the hammer.

The health of all enemies is constantly displayed at the top of the screen with numbered red meters. Players defeat enemies by reducing their health to nothing. Some enemies carry weapons like the player. When fighting these enemies, a Durability meter for their weapon will appear in addition to their health meter. These enemies may be defeated by depleting either their health or weapon durability. In the case of the latter, the player will receive the same crafting material their opponent had in his/her weapon, not including the shape stone.

In this game, players create their own weapons through a crafting process. To create a weapon, the player must first have an item, called a Shapestone, of one of five varieties – sword, axe, spear, knuckle, or drill. A craft material is added to a shapestone to create a usable weapon; which material is used determines the strength of the weapon that is created. After obtaining a certain skill level in crafting, the player will gain the ability to upgrade weapons with additional materials. This may result in the weapon gaining special qualities. Players have the option to disassemble weapons they have created to retrieve the Shapestone used to make it. The Shapestone may retain some of the power of the weapon it was disassembled from. Any materials used to create or upgrade the disassembled weapon are lost. Repairing is the most important of all. It recovers all the lost DUR from all the weapons you have. It can also repair weapons which already have a 0 DUR.

== Plot ==
In Summon Night: Swordcraft 2, the player is an orphan from the Colthearts clan raised by a Craftknight (a smith/warrior). The character aspires to be a Craftknight as well. The player character, either Edgar Colthearts or Aera Colthearts, who are Edge Fencers, find themselves at the site of an abandoned ruin, where a violent Summon Beast named Goura is awakened. In order to protect their new family, Edgar/Aera is bound to a wild Summon Beast (stray summon) and embarks on a journey to reseal the ruins.

As the new swordcrafter and his/her Summon Beast goes on their adventure, they start to learn more about the ruins, the monster inside, and most important, his/her father's past, along with a mysterious power infused in his/her body and soul. Fighting monsters, going to strange and exotic places and meeting all sort of creatures, humans and spirits, the quest starts shaping the character to maturity and courage.

== Characters ==
=== Playable characters ===
Edgar Colthearts (エッジ・コルトハーツ, Edge Korutohātsu) and Aera Colthearts (エア・コルトハーツ, Air Korutohātsu): The main male and female characters respectively. Edgar is very thoughtful of others and tries his best to be useful; Aera is bright, kind, and just a little bit of a scatterbrain. Their mother died when they were just born and their father, Graham Colthearts, died when he saved them, leaving them in the care of their father's close friend, Blaire. Unbeknownst to them, they are part of a family that for generation after generation has protected the seal of Goura with the Daemon Edge. Now a power has revived Goura and it is up to them to find the Daemon Edge and reseal Goura forever. Blaire will help them as much as he can, but he'd be cursed by Goura and it will be up to Edgar and Aera's crafting abilities to get the Daemon Edge and seal Goura. For some reason, they have a problem with machines, and are infamous among their friends for breaking mechanical objects upon handling.

Guardian Beasts

Summon Night: Swordcraft Story 2 features four "Guardian Beasts" that assist the hero with magic and items during battle. A Guardian Beast is acquired at the beginning of the game, where the player answers as to what he/she sees lying in the road injured. The chosen Guardian Beast then acts as the player's partner throughout the game, and cannot be changed. The choice of Guardian Beast affects much of the dialogue in the game, but the general plot remains the same for all Guardian Beasts.

EX-e-LD (イグゼルド, Iguzerudo):

EX-e-LD (Exeld) the robot, is a "long-range combat support automaton". It believes in logic above all else, and is frequently frustrated when dealing with the flighty main character. When it is teased too much it begins to overheat, resulting in a system restart. EX-e-LD is from the Mechanical Realm of Lorilal.

Loki (レキ, Reki):

This brash young demon is constantly trying to make himself stronger through combat. He has an abundance of self-confidence – perhaps too much – and violence is almost always his first (and only) option. He sees himself as the player's protector and strives to improve his sword skills at every turn. Loki is from the Oni Realm of Silturn.

Dinahi Dinadi (ディナヒ・ディナディ, Dinahi Dinadi):

Dinahi "Dinah" is a devil who shares her body with an angel. The devil side prefers to be sarcastic and controlling, while the angel side abhors conflict. The devil controls the body most of the time, but in times of stress the angel is able to take over Dinah's body and speak out (usually to apologize for what the devil side was doing). Dinah is from the Spiritual Realm of Sapureth.

Arnokoi Anokoi (アーノコイ・亜野恋, Ānokoi):

They are a half-beast from the world of Mae Trope. A self-proclaimed "child of the wind" of indeterminate gender, they can hear the wind's secrets and claims to be able to fly. They are very gentle and peaceful, but sometimes their peaceful nature and lack of tact gets in the way of helping others in dire situations. They can speak with the wind and seems to change their personality with wind.

=== Other characters ===
- Blaire (ベルグ, Berugu): Blaire is the player character's adoptive father. He is Cliff Village's resident Craftknight, and he has trained his children Orin and Tatiana, along with the player, in the ways of Craftknighthood. He is generally upbeat and optimistic, but is always deadly serious when it comes to crafting weapons.
- Orin (オルカ, Oruka): Orin is the son of Blaire. He is very skilled with machines, and often comes to the player's rescue in the course of the game when something needs to be fixed. He is intelligent and a powerful Craftknight, and is generally humble. He loves to tease his little sister Tatiana and the player. He is also a great cook.
- Tatani Tutiana (多々二・トゥティアナ, Tatani Tutiana): Tatani Tutiana "Tatiana" is the daughter of Blaire. While she has some training as a Craftknight, Tatiana is still young and has taken to the role of housekeeper (since nobody else in the family seems to care). She is innocent and looks up to her brother Orin and the player. She is a terrible cook but is always willing to show off her culinary skills, much to everyone else's dismay.
- Ryouga (リョウガ, Ryouga): Ryouga is the protagonist's best friend. He is not originally from Cliff Village; he and his sister Lynnuito moved in from the wilderness several years ago, but have become respected members of the community. Ryouga is the player character's best friend, and is revealed to be a Summon Creature, who cooperated with Gedharm to revive Goura.
- Lynnri Rinrii Runnrii (リィーンリ・凛利井・トゥティアナ, Rinri Rinrii Runrii): Lynnri "Lynn" is Ryouga's sister. She has great influence over the main characters, using her charm and sex appeal to get favours at times. Also Linn always tries to kiss the main character regardless of gender. She searched high and low for Ryouga, pretending to be on the main character's side but really she's been deceiving you and has planned to betray you since the beginning. It is revealed later that she is also a Summon Creature, who is trapped in a bond with her master Guren to revive Goura.
- Gabriel (ガブリオ, Gaburio): Gabriel is the leader of the Wind Brigade. He is a Summon Creature from Maetropa, like Arno too. He has wolf-like qualities: incredible sense of smell, and only feels relaxed in a pack. He desires going back to his world, and met Gedharm, who convinced Gabriel to join him, and in return to send him back to his world. He then created trouble for the main character in black armor, and was known to them as the Black Swordsman. This explains why whenever the Black Swordsman appears, Gabriel is nowhere to be seen and Xeride covers up for him. His identity is revealed later.
- Ninani Ninyai Nunnyai (ニナニ・ニニャイ・ヌニャイ, Ninani Ninyai Nunyai): Ninani "Nina Nina" is a ghost-like girl who dwells in the Roaring Cavern. She was a novice summoner from another island, but being horribly bad at reading maps, ended up at that island while finding ingredients for her teacher. She ended up in a boat and dozed off, and woke up as a spirit. She found out a Summon Creature named Passeau had stolen her body, and often comes back to taunt her with it. She had tried unsuccessfully many times to take back her body. She's a caring person and tries to be as helpful as possible to the main character. Eventually, with the help of the main character, she gets her body back from Passeau.
- Passeau Pasuu (パッセアウ・パッスゥー, Passeau Pasuu): Passeau is a Summon Creature who took Nina's body away from her. Sometimes she taunts her with it just to make Nina feel bad. Passeau is loud and acts tough but actually she is a complete coward and can't be bothered doing things that are too difficult, the complete opposite of Nina. She claims that she is Ryouga's lover and will try to defeat you to steal his heart, of course it doesn't actually work. She is obsessed with Ryouga and nearly always talk about him when you see her. Passeau is later defeated by the main character and is driven out of Nina's body.
- Toumei Tumei (東明・トゥーメイ, Tōmei Tūmei): Toumei is a Summon Creature. He is from the Onmyoji Temple, and is his own master, calling himself a Vagrant Summon. He entered Cliff Village one day, proclaiming that he was to bring peace to the world, and expel the evil spirit surrounding the village. In the beginning he was thought to have a motive for entering the village, but he really wants good to come for them. He is quite obsessive but helped out the main character a lot throughout the storyline, helping him/her expel Goura's spirit from Borgrim and Passeau out of Nina's body. He likes swords, and conversations with him do not always make a lot of sense.
- Sarin (さりん, Sarin): Sarin is a mermaid which is in love with Byron that would be in love with you. (even if you choose the female character)
- Byron (ビヨーン, Byōn): Byron is a sea treasure hunter which is in love with Sarin.
- Kuuya Kuya (空也・久夜, Kūya Kuya): Kuuya is a character who lives around the Oni Hotsprings with his younger sister and uses a scythe. He was cursed by a summon creature protecting the fourth Daemon Edge while trying to save his sister Kohina.
- Kohina (コヒナ, Kohina): Kohina is Kuuya's younger sister who was also cursed by the summon creature guarding the fourth Daemon Edge. She and his brother Kuuya spends time on the hotsprings to temporarily remedy their wounds from the curse.
- Magna Cressment (マグナ・クレスメント, Maguna Kuresumento)/Torris Cressment (トリス・クレスメント, Torisu Kuresumento): Magna/Torris is a very powerful summoner from Summon Night 2. He/she is playable in Extras.
- Nesty Besuti Nasuku Basque (ネスティー・ベスティ・那須久・バスク, Nesutī Besuti Nasuku Basuku): Nesty is a skilled sorcerer from Summon Night 2. He is used in Extras as Magna's/Torris's partner.
- Amer (アメル, Ameru): Amer is a famous angel incarnate from Summon Night 2. She is Magna's/Torris's partner in Extras.
- Goura: Goura is a summon creature sealed within the ruins in Cliff Village. He secretly controls Lynn due to the bond she made with Goura's master Guren. He is also the main antagonist of Summon Night 2.
- Guren (紅蓮, Guren): Guren is a summoner who wants to control the power of Goura, but because of Guren's over confidence, he unexpectedly lost control, created a havoc and destroyed the Cliff Village.

== Reception ==
Reception

Aggregate score
Aggregator	Score
Metacritic	79/100

Review scores
Publication	Score
Famitsu	34/40
Game Informer	7.25/10
GameSpot	7.3/10
GameSpy	3.5/5
IGN	8.5/10
Nintendo Power	8/10
411Mania	8.5/10

Summon Night: Swordcraft Story 2 received "favorable" reviews according to the review aggregation website Metacritic. Reviewers commented that the game felt more refined than its predecessor, Summon Night: Swordcraft Story, but praised the quality of the graphics and the humor of the dialogue. The game was criticized for a lack of depth in its story and having excessive backtracking through only a small number of areas. In Japan, Famitsu gave it a score of one eight, one ten, and two eights for a total of 34 out of 40.
