= Summon Night 3 =

2003 video game

- PlayStation 2 box art
- Developers: Flight-Plan; Felistella (PSP)
- Publishers: JP: Banpresto; JP: Namco Bandai Games (PSP)
- Directors: Takayuki Kinoshita; Hirokazu Kawase
- Designers: Keitarō Yoshida; Shinya Ishihara
- Writer: Shū Miyakozuki
- Series: Summon Night
- Platforms: PlayStation 2, PlayStation Portable
- Release: JP: August 7, 2003 (PS2); JP: October 4, 2012 (PSP)
- Genre: Tactical RPG
- Mode: Single-player

Summon Night 3 (Note: Japanese: サモンナイト３, Hepburn: Samon Naito Surī) is the third main entry in the Summon Night series of video games. The game was initially developed by Flight-Plan and released by Banpresto for the PlayStation 2 in 2003. The game was later remade for the PlayStation Portable in 2012. Both versions were only released in Japan, not being localized into English for any other regions.

== Gameplay ==
The game plays as a tactical role-playing game. The game contains multiple difficulty levels.

== Story ==
The game follows the male protagonist Rexx or the female protagonist Aty. As with other games in the series, it takes place in the fictional world of Lyndbaum.

== Development ==
The initial version of the game was developed by Flight-Plan and published by Banpresto. The game was released on August 7, 2003, on the PlayStation 2 video game console. The game was only released in Japan, it was not localized into English for any other regions.

The PSP version of the game was created upon Namco Bandai acquiring Banpresto, who had the rights to the Summon Night IP. The game, along with its sequel, Summon Night 4, were remade in order to promote the release of a new game on the platform, 2013's Summon Night 5. With Flight-Plan's closure, all three titles were developed by Felistella. The game was released on October 4, 2012.

== Reception and sales ==
The PlayStation 2 release of the game sold over 156,000 copies it first week of sales, higher than both of the later mainline series releases.

== Legacy ==
Main characters Rexx and Aty both make appearances in future sequel Summon Night 5. Aty appears as a playable character in the crossover video game Project X Zone 2.
