= RPG Maker (video game) =

- North American PlayStation box art
- Developer(s): Kuusou Kagaku
- Publisher(s): JP: Enterbrain; NA: Agetec
- Series: RPG Maker
- Platform(s): PlayStation, PlayStation 2, PlayStation 3
- Release: JP: November 27, 1997; NA: October 2, 2000
- Genre(s): Role-playing
- Mode(s): Single-player

RPG Maker (RPGツクール3; RPG Tsukūru 3) is the first PlayStation version of the RPG Maker series and the overall third installment on home consoles. It allows players with generally low game making experience to create their own 2D role-playing video games (RPGs), which they can share with other RPG Maker owners via a memory card.

== Anime Maker ==
In order to allow players to create their own graphics and animations for RPG Maker, a second program (on the same disc as the RPG Maker) called Anime Maker is included, which creators could use to design graphics and import them into their role-playing games. The disc has all the sample data character graphics, as well as several more examples which can be modified and saved onto the memory card. There is also a section for creating splash title screens and a monster creator that allows the creator to make four different sized monster images, and there is a limited selection of preset monsters to load into the editor to modify and save onto the Memory Card, including one monster image type (Kami) with four color variants. There is also a section with a couple of backgrounds on which creators could do simple animations with larger character images (the same images can be found on the disc itself, modified and saved to the Memory Card). This portion is mainly for amateurs and is designed to be used with the uncommon PlayStation Mouse.

== Gameplay ==
=== General information ===
RPG Maker allows the player to make a role-playing video game.

=== Events ===
Allows players to add objects that when activated will play conditions.

=== Monsters ===
Allows players to make monsters that are hand drawn or picked from a list of presets.
