= Dragon Ball Z: Legendary Super Warriors =

2002 video game

- North American box art
- Developer: Flight-Plan
- Publishers: EU: Infogrames Europe; JP: Banpresto; NA: Infogrames
- Director: Takayuki Kinoshita
- Producers: Shintarō Miura; Masami Watanabe
- Programmers: Kiyohiko Wakayama; Daisuke Kurokawa
- Writer: Noriyuki Itō
- Series: Dragon Ball
- Platform: Game Boy Color
- Release: UK: June 28, 2002; JP: August 9, 2002; NA: November 8, 2002
- Genre: Role-playing
- Modes: Single-player, multiplayer

Dragon Ball Z: Legendary Super Warriors (Note: Japanese: ドラゴンボールZ 伝説の超戦士たち, Hepburn: Doragon Bōru Zetto Densetsu no Chô Senshi Tachi) is a turn-based fighting game released for the Game Boy Color. It is played with the use of in-game cards for attacks, techniques and support items. The game's story takes place from the start of Dragon Ball Z, the Saiyan Saga, and runs until the end of the Buu Saga. The game includes two extra stories involving Future Trunks's timeline.

Once the game has been completed, the player can replay the story mode or battle modes the game has with the freedom to use any characters and forms they choose in any of the given battles. During the player's second playthrough, they may be able to unlock additional characters if certain criteria are met.

== Gameplay ==
Dragon Ball Z: Legendary Super Warriors features a turn-based card fighting system. There are 125 cards in the game to be used. The 3 types of cards are attack cards, support cards, for healing or stat boosting, and defense cards. The game has character specific cards to be used strategically during battles. Each character has 4 stats which are Health Points, Strength, Ki, and Speed. Health points determine how long you can last in battle, Strength determines how much damage the melee cards do, Ki determines how much damage the beam cards deal, and Speed determines the accuracy of the player's attacks, the phase of battle the character is in, and the chance of avoiding an enemy's attack. The Speed stat is mostly a defensive stat. To increase these stats the player must level up the characters by gaining experience points through battling or to temporarily increase stats by using a support card mid-battle. Each character may only be leveled up 4 times total and since each character has unique stat attributes the game has a strategy element. Before a battle the player must assemble a deck of 20 cards that they must use to battle the opponent with. In a battle there are two phases, the attack and defense phase. During the attack phase the player's main objective is to both build up card cost (CC) points, which are currency to be able to use the cards in the deck, with command cards, which require quick button presses to activate, and to deal damage to the opponent. In the attack phase the character may use a basic no cost melee card, a command card, to gain CC, a support card, a damage card, a beam card or use the Gather-power card to increase the Ki and Strength stat. During the defense phase the player has the option to use CC on a support card, a defensive card, or to guard, or move up, forward, or down. The phase the player is in is determined by the character's speed stat and depending on the support cards used can change the phase mid-battle. Each character has 3 decks. The first is the limit deck in which up to 3 cards, 2 cards for a few exceptions, may be placed into to be used by the character indefinitely provided they use the Gather-power card first. The second is the deck the player assembled. The third deck is a fixed deck that has the stage-attack, Gather-power, Guard and move cards.

== Game modes ==
=== Story Mode ===
There are 30 battles in the story mode with 2 extra unlock-able battles. Between battles the game's story mode is shown through character portraits and text bubbles. Before every fight the player can save the game, alter the deck, and choose which fighter to play with. Every 10th battle the player will face the boss of the saga which are Frieza, Cell, and (kid) Buu. In this mode after every battle won the player gets a choice of unlocking a card. This mode also features an overworld in which the player can interact with NPC's and find more cards. If certain criteria are met in this mode, new characters may be unlocked. During the first play through only heroes may be unlocked. The villains may be unlocked in the second play through.

=== Battle Mode ===
In this mode the player chooses one character and must face enemy after enemy without saving. This mode is used for unlocking new cards and to gain experience quickly to level up the characters. The longer the player last the higher the chance of encountering a rare card. There are 3 tiers in battle mode. They are low, mid, and high. A character can only fight against opponents in their own tier.

=== V.S. Mode ===
This is the Multiplayer mode. The player can trade cards and battle against another player in this mode.
