= Flight-Plan =

Japanese video game development company

Flight Plan
- Type: Public
- Industry: Video games
- Founded: September 30, 1989
- Defunct: August 2010
- Headquarters: Gifu, Gifu, Japan
- Key people: Masami Watanabe (president)
- Products: Black/Matrix series Summon Night series
- Number of employees: 38
- Website: www.flight-plan.jp/

Flight-Plan Co., Ltd. (Note: Japanese: 株式会社フライト・プラン, Hepburn: Kabushiki-gaisha Furaito-Puran) was a Japanese video game developer best known for the Summon Night series of role-playing video games published by Banpresto. Founded in 1989, Flight-Plan began by developing the Black/Matrix series of tactical role-playing games, published by NEC Interchannel (later Interchannel Holon) in Japan. In January 2007, Flight-Plan began self-publishing some of its games, such as Dragon Shadow Spell and Sacred Blaze. Other clients of the company have included Sony, Nintendo, and Sega.

In August 2010, the company quietly closed its offices and ceased business, and their website was taken offline.

== Games ==
Titles released outside of Japan have a * after their title.

- Metamor Jupiter - (1993, Turbo CD)
- CAL III: Kanketsuhen - (1994, Turbo CD)
- Chiki Chiki Boys - (1994, Turbo CD)
- Dōkyūsei- (1995, Turbo CD)
- Dōkyūsei if - (1996, Saturn)
- Dōkyūsei 2 - (1997, Saturn)
- Refrain Love - (1997, Saturn)
- NOel 3: Mission on the Line - (1998, PlayStation/Saturn)
- Dragon Ball Z: Legendary Super Warriors* - (2002, Game Boy Color)
- Dragon Shadow Spell - (2007, PlayStation 2)
- Eternal Poison* - (2008, PlayStation 2)
- Shining Force Feather - (2009, Nintendo DS)
- Sacred Blaze - (2009, PlayStation 2)

=== Black/Matrix series ===
- Black/Matrix - (1998, Saturn)
- Black/Matrix AD - (1999, Dreamcast)
- Black Matrix Cross - (2000, PlayStation)
- Black Matrix Zero - (2002, Game Boy Advance)
- Black Matrix 2 - (2002, PlayStation 2)
- Black Matrix 00 - (2004, PlayStation)

=== Summon Night series ===
- Summon Night - (2000, PlayStation)
- Summon Night 2 - (2001, PlayStation)
- Summon Night 3 - (2003, PlayStation 2)
- Summon Night: Swordcraft Story* - (2003, Game Boy Advance)
- Summon Night: Swordcraft Story 2* - (2004, Game Boy Advance)
- Summon Night Craft Sword Monogatari: Hajimari no Ishi - (2005, Game Boy Advance)
- Summon Night EX-These: Yoake no Tsubasa - (2005, PlayStation 2)
- Summon Night 4 - (2006, PlayStation 2)
- Summon Night: Twin Age* - (2007, Nintendo DS)
- Summon Night DS - (2008, Nintendo DS)
- Summon Night 2 DS - (2008, Nintendo DS)
- Summon Night X: Tears Crown - (2009, Nintendo DS)
- Summon Night Gran-These - (2010, PlayStation 2)
