= Black/Matrix =

- Cover art for Black/Matrix 00
- Developer: Flight-Plan
- Publisher: NEC Interchannel
- Designers: Gou Bitou, Kyoko Tsuchiya
- Platforms: Sega Saturn, Dreamcast, PlayStation
- Release: August 27, 1998 (SAT); September 30, 1999 (DC); February 14, 2000 (PS1)
- Genre: Tactical RPG
- Mode: Single player

Black/Matrix (ブラックマトリクス) is a series of tactical role-playing games developed by Flight-Plan and published by NEC Interchannel. All titles in the series are Japan-exclusive.

Each installment in the series combines standard tactical RPG gameplay with a pastiche of Judeo-Christian religious themes, particularly concerning the nature of good and evil and the interplay between Heaven, Hell, and Earth and the denizens thereof. One title was considered for North American release in 1999, and it is believed that it was eventually passed over due to its religion-derived themes.

The original Black/Matrix title was released August 27, 1998 for the Sega Saturn console in Japan. There were two subsequent remake releases that add more detailed graphics and additional content: Black/Matrix AD (Advanced) for Dreamcast was released in 1999, and Black/Matrix + (Cross) for PlayStation was released in 2000.

The world of Black/Matrix is fictional and fantasy-based, and in it the forces of Hell won a decisive war against the forces of Heaven. The victorious devils rewrote history and redesigned society to suit their purposes, reversing the concepts of good and evil. The descendants of the devils, known as black-wings because of the bat-like wings that grow from their backs, rule over the white-wing descendants of the angels, whom they treat as sub-human slaves. In their society love is considered the worst of crimes, and any one found guilty of love or kindness is hunted and punished.

== Gameplay ==
Black/Matrix gives the player control of a group of playable characters who traverse various two-dimensional 3/4 isometric-view maps that represent towns and battlefields. The flow of gameplay cycles between expository cut scenes revealing the plot, towns and menus for procurement and management of items and equipment, and battles which pit the playable characters against computer controlled opponents in battle maps. Progression through Black/Matrix is plot-driven, and the player has limited influence on the overall course of the game - evidenced by the absence of an overworld map mode.

The gameplay in Black/Matrix is broken into chapters based on plot themes, and the plot is delivered in fully voiced cut scenes that begin and conclude each chapter, as well as precede and follow each battle. The visual style of the cut scenes varies based on version; Black/Matrix and Black/Matrix + use the same graphical style seen in town and battlefield maps, while Black/Matrix AD employs visual novel style static landscapes with large character sprites superimposed over them. Regardless of form these scenes announce events such as the addition of new playable characters, and occasionally offer the player opportunities to recruit optional characters such as white-wing slaves and, depending on the version, unused master characters.

=== Battle mechanics ===
Battles are organized into turns which alternate between the player and the computer. During the player turn any player-controlled character can perform actions in any order, with a maximum of three actions per character per turn. Every character can use the actions "move", "attack", and "item", though depending on the character and the point in the game, they may have others actions as well. The move action allows a character to travel on the map; battlefield maps are composed of square tiles and the number of tiles in a given character's range is determined by their statistics. Characters have a single preset attack technique and can equip any type of weapon appropriate to that technique; for example, a character with the "stab" attack type can equip rapiers, spears, and staffs. Additionally, characters automatically respond by counterattacking, defending, or attempting to dodge when they are attacked; the player can switch the response at any time through the "Waiting Stance" command.

Specific, plot-determined characters have access to the "magic" command at all times, while others require special equipment to unlock it. Spell effectiveness varies from turn to turn, as governed by a "Biorhythm" clock. In place of conventional magic points to manage magic use, Black/Matrix uses a system called "Blood Points". Blood Points can be distributed to individual playable characters before battles to expend in spell casting. Blood points are accrued by attacking the prostrate bodies of defeated enemies, effectively killing them. (Some fallen playable characters are susceptible to the same fate, after which they are lost permanently.) Additionally, the player can infuse a weapon with Blood Points to improve its effectiveness and possibly unlock a special attack called a "latent ability". Latent abilities function like spells in that they cost Blood Points to use and add various effects to the damage dealt by the weapon.

At the conclusion of each battle the game evaluates the player's performance and assigns a letter grade-based rank, which determines the value of bonus items and the amounts of money and experience points the player is awarded. Experience points go into a common pool and the player distributes it to the characters at will, choosing which characters gain experience levels. Upon level-up, the player also determines how a given character's statistics mature, allowing for customization.

=== Characters ===
Abel (アベル, Aberu) (Hiroshi Kamiya), is the amnesiac silent protagonist of Black/Matrix - his dialog is not shown on screen. A white-wing slave, he is locked in Golgoda Prison for the crime of love. He exhibits a power to transform black-wings into white-wings, which marks him as the 'messiah'.

Black/Matrix begins with the player choosing a black-wing 'master', i.e. companion, for Abel, which affects the beginning and ending of the game. The choices are:

- Domina (ドミナ, Domina) (Noriko Hidaka), the 'pure' girl.
- Purica (プリカ, Purika) (Mika Kanai), the 'childish' girl.
- Michette (ミシェット, Mishetto) (Yuko Miyamura), the 'lolita' girl.
- Kurreshes (クレージュ, Kurēju) (Junko Shimakata), the 'tomboy' girl.
- Prague (プラハ, Puraha) (Wakana Yamazaki), the 'mature' girl.

There is an additional secret male master, Zero (ゼロ, Zero) (Kentarou Itou), who becomes available after inputting a code (which differs in each release).

Leburobus (レブロブス, Reburobusu) (Hideyuki Hori) is a white-wing criminal. He was once a gladiator, but was sent to Golgoda Prison for killing his former masters. He is very tough and uses swords and other heavy weapons. He seeks "freedom", and joins Abel's escape.

Gaius (ガイウス, Gaiusu) (Kaneto Shiozawa) is a white-wing criminal. He gained fame as "Gaius the Gale" for stealing from the rich to give to the poor, but is later imprisoned for the crime of "hypocrisy" as a result. He joins Abel's escape.

Phillipo (ピリポ, Piripo) (Hiro Yuuki) is a blond-haired boy whom Abel encounters in Golgoda Prison at the beginning of the game. Though he is a black-wing, he is shunned because of his weakness. He escapes with the party and becomes an archer.

Johannes (John) (ヨハネ, Yohane) (Takeshi Aono) is the black-wing former high priest of the Temple of the Sun who lost his position after a power-struggle. He is a necromancer who can use magic to revive dead characters as zombie decoys. After witnessing Abel's mysterious powers, he joins the group.

RupiRupi (ルピルピ, Rupirupi) (Kikuko Inoue) is a black-wing former student of Johannes who took over his research, eventually becoming a Demon Knight. She casts powerful healing spells. Her hobby is writing in a "revenge diary".

Marco (マルコ, Maruko) (Ai Orikasa), a white-wing, is known as the "Miracle Boy" for becoming the first person to don an Arch-demon Armor. Despite his youthful looks, he is the leader of a white-wing liberation movement.

=== Reception ===
On release, Famitsu magazine scored the Dreamcast version of the game a 30 out of 40.

== Black/Matrix II ==
Black/Matrix II
- Developer: Flight-Plan
- Publisher: NEC Interchannel
- Designer: Kyoko Tsuchiya
- Engine: RenderWare
- Platform: PlayStation 2
- Release: March 28, 2002
- Genre: Tactical RPG
- Mode: Single player

Black/Matrix II was released March 28, 2002 for the PlayStation 2. The game is set primarily in the 'Hell Realm' and centers on a group of elite devils fighting to repulse an invasion of their realm by angels and humans.

While the fictional world of Black/Matrix II is again fantasy-based, it is distinct from the original game. It is divided into three realms - heaven, home to white-winged angels; the human world, inhabited by relatively weak, wingless people; and hell, where black-winged devils reside. The three realms are largely independent and their natives are suspicious of the other realms. Many humans have been convinced of the evil nature of Hell by the angels, but for all their fearsome powers neither the devils nor Hell itself are inherently malevolent. Hell is ruled by the beautiful and compassionate Jenarose, who is said to love humankind more than anyone in the world.

=== Gameplay ===
Black/Matrix II brings the series into full 3D, modifying gameplay elements found in previous Black/Matrix releases. The game is divided into four chapters, and the basic flow of gameplay initiates with the player selecting a destination on the overworld map, followed by alternating expository cut scenes and battle maps. Towns, a usual element of tactical RPGs that allow for the purchase of items and equipment, are omitted in Black/Matrix II and shops are accessible from the overworld map and pre-battle menus.

Black/Matrix II features a branching plotline, where the player's choices influence the course of events. There are numerous possible endings and four possible heroines.

=== Characters ===
Reiji (レイジ, Reiji), the main character, is said to be the strongest devil in Hell. Widely known by the sobriquet "General Tempest", he is the younger brother of the master of Hell, and the leader of the "Fear Quartet" of top-ranking devils. Despite his power, Reiji is killed when human armies invade Hell and resurrects later with no memory of his prior life.

Vidia (ヴィディア, Vidia) is Reiji's subordinate and friend. Known as the "Killing Dust", she favors broadswords and other heavy weapons and is teased for her fierceness and impatience. She harbors an unrequited love for Reiji.

Gilvise (ギルヴァイス, Giruvaisu), like Vidia, is Reiji's subordinate and friend. He has a glib manner of speech and appears to not take things very seriously, but is actually very observant and cool-headed. He serves as Reiji's main adviser.

Ridiearl (リディエール, Ridiēru) is the commander of the paladin army that led the human invasion of Hell. She has a zealous hatred of devils, yet bears a striking physical resemblance to Jenarose, the master of Hell.

Parge (パージュ, Pāji) is the only female member of the Fear Quartet. She possesses a power called Squeeze that drains the life from anyone who approaches her, inspiring a lifelong sense of isolation. When her deadly powers fade after the death of the master of Hell, she begins looking after an abandoned human child.

Uni (ユーニ, Yūni) is a member of the Fear Quartet whose bishōnen looks disguise ruthless battle capabilities for which he is feared by foes and allies alike. As he enjoys pulling the wings off of his defeated opponents, he is nicknamed "Feathercide Uni".

Forester (フォレスター, Foresutā) is a member of the Fear Quartet known throughout Hell for his intelligence. Like a mad scientist, he has no interest in anything other than his experiments and the automata he builds.

=== Reception ===
On release, Famitsu magazine scored the game a 30 out of 40.

== Black Matrix Zero ==
Black Matrix Zero
- Developer: Flight-Plan
- Publisher: NEC Interchannel
- Platform: Game Boy Advance
- Release: August 30, 2002
- Genre: Tactical RPG
- Mode: Single player

Black Matrix Zero was released August 30, 2002 for the Game Boy Advance.

Black Matrix Zero is set in the same fictional world as the original Black/Matrix game, though hundreds of years prior. Three divisions of humankind share the same world - white-winged people who are called angels, black-winged people who are called devils, and wingless people. Those who have wings have great powers and pay little mind to the wingless ones. The angels rule the world via a religious organization called the Prodevon Church, which ensures both the cooperation and ignorance of the wingless people.

=== Characters ===
Character voices apply to Black/Matrix 00.

Cain (カイン, Kain) (Ryōko Shiraishi) is the main character, a wingless boy who always ends up opposing angels in order to rescue his friend Matia. Early in either version of the game he receives wings - in Zero, the player can pick between devil wings or angel wings, while in Black/Matrix 00 Cain can only receive angel wings.

Matia (マティア, Matia) (Kozue Kamada) is Cain's childhood friend who, though wingless, possesses a mysterious power. She is taken into the custody of the Prodevon Church at the beginning of the game.

Johannes (John) (ヨハネ, Yohane) (Kazuhiko Inoue) is an angel with gray wings who associates with Cain and Matia. Very learned and wise, he is a voice of reason for Cain. He constantly wears a mask. Specializes in offensive magic.

Luca (ルカ, Ruka) (Nana Mizuki) is a devil girl who takes an interest in Cain at the beginning of the game. She uses a whip and casts healing spells.

Zion (ザイオン, Zaion) (Kazuya Nakai) is Luca's admirer, a very strong devil who uses axes. He has leathery wings, blonde hair and a pair of goggles around his neck.

Stayen (ステイエン, Suteien) (Natsuki Yoshihara) is a wingless soldier for the Prodevon Church who is completely convinced that the Church's actions are justified. She is a blue-haired girl with glasses who wears a white uniform. She uses rapiers.

Exal (エクサル, Ekusaru) (Takayuki Sasada) is a lively, black-haired fighter for the secret organization Cypherpunk which opposes the Prodevon Church. He appears early in the game and is characterized by his bright red scarf.

Valtoss (ヴァルトス, Varutosu) (Atsushi Kisaichi) is a devil and the founder Cypherpunk. Has long blond hair who wears a brown coat and a beige mantle.

Syria (シリア, Shiria) (Kumiko Izumi) is a double-winged angel and the younger sister of the powerful Seraph Beir Perendale. She wears a big blue dress, has short blonde hair. She uses bows and status-cure spells, as well as a powerful healing spell called Rulic Heal.

Lilis (リリス, Ririsu) (Youko Nishino) is a wingless girl, a friend of Matia, whom the party rescues from prison. She has short brown hair, a thin white dress and a chain around her neck. She casts healing spells.

Kilota (キロタ, Kirota) (Yuki Makishima) is a boy about the same age as Lilis. He has blue hair and glasses and uses bows to fight. He is the younger brother of Stayen.

=== Reception ===
On release, four reviewers in Famitsu magazine individually gave the game scores of 8/10, 7/10, 8/10, and 8/10.

== Black/Matrix 00 ==
The concept for Black Matrix Zero was adapted into Black/Matrix 00, which was released in Japan on May 13, 2004 for the PlayStation. It bears the distinction of being the last game released for the system.
