= Summon Night =

Video game series

- Genre: Role-playing game
- Developers: Felistella; Flight-Plan; Banpresto; Media.Vision
- Publishers: Banpresto; Bandai Namco Entertainment
- First release: Summon Night; January 6, 2000
- Latest release: Summon Night 6: Lost Borders; March 10, 2016

Summon Night (サモンナイト, Samon Naito) is a series of role-playing video games, mixed with elements of a visual novel based dating sim. The series is primarily developed by Flight-Plan, published by Banpresto, and owned by Bandai Namco Entertainment. The character designs are by Izuka Takeshi. The series has had six main line entries, and seven spin-off entries, spanning the PlayStation, PlayStation 2, PlayStation 4, PlayStation Portable, PlayStation Vita, Game Boy Advance and Nintendo DS video game consoles.

Until 2015, no main entries to the series had been released outside of Japan. The only titles localized into English were the spinoff games Summon Night: Twin Age, Summon Night: Swordcraft Story and its sequel, Summon Night: Swordcraft Story 2.

In April 2015, it was announced that Gaijinworks would translate and publish the latest entry in the series, Summon Night 5, in North America and Europe. On December 15, 2015, it was released in North America but a European release never came to fruition. The game was considered a success in North America, with its sales being enough to warrant Gaijinworks to translate its sequel Summon Night 6, which was released in both North America and Europe in late 2017. The Summon Night series has sold a total of 1.904 million copies.

== Games ==
=== Main series ===
The games from the main series are all strategy RPGs. They take place in the same world and same continuity, but the stories between games are mostly unrelated.

- Summon Night (January 6, 2000)
  Released for the PlayStation/remade for Nintendo DS.
- Summon Night 2 (August 2, 2001)
  Released for the PlayStation/remade for Nintendo DS.
- Summon Night 3 (August 7, 2003)
  Released for the PlayStation 2/Remake for the PSP was released on October 4, 2012.
- Summon Night 4 (November 30, 2006)
  Released for the PlayStation 2/Remake for the PSP was released on November 15, 2012.
- Summon Night 5 (May 16, 2013)
  Released for the PSP.
- Summon Night 6: Lost Borders (2016)
  Released for PlayStation Vita and PlayStation 4.

=== Spin-offs ===
The following games are action-RPGs in the style of Ys or Seiken Densetsu.

- Summon Night EX-These: Yoake no Tsubasa (August 4, 2005)
  Released for the PlayStation 2.
- Summon Night Twin Age: Seireitachi no Kyoumei (Koe) (August 30, 2007; USA: June 3, 2008)
  Released for the Nintendo DS, localized by Atlus in the US as Summon Night: Twin Age.
- Summon Night Gran-These: Horobi no Tsurugi to Yakusoku no Kishi (March 11, 2010)
  Released for the PlayStation 2.

The following three games are Summon Night games in the action-RPG style of the Tales of saga.

- Summon Night: Swordcraft Story (Japan: April 25, 2003; USA: July 26, 2006)
  Released for the Game Boy Advance, localized by Atlus in the USA.
- Summon Night: Swordcraft Story 2 (Japan: August 20, 2004; USA: October 17, 2006)
  Released for the Game Boy Advance; also localized by Atlus.
- Summon Night Swordcraft Story 3: Stone of Beginnings (December 8, 2005)
  Released for the Game Boy Advance.

The following game is an RPG with turn-based battles in the style of the Final Fantasy series.

- Summon Night X: Tears Crown (November 5, 2009)
  Released for the Nintendo DS.

== Setting ==
All of the Summon Night games take place in Lyndbaum, a world similar to medieval Europe with the inclusion of modern factories and railroads, placing Summon Night in a steampunk setting. Lyndbaum is surrounded by four other worlds: Loreilal, the land from where mechanical creatures come; Silturn, the land of yokai; Sapureth, where angels and demons live; and Maetropa, from where half-humans, magical beasts, fairies and other mythical creatures hail. Besides those four there are also countless other worlds, including our world (the "real" world) where the main characters of the first game are transported from. Certain boundaries separate the worlds from each other, making the various summoning techniques the only way to transport things between them.
