= List of tactical role-playing video games: 2005 to 2009 =

This is a comprehensive index of commercial tactical role-playing games (Tactical RPGs), sorted chronologically by year. Information regarding release platform, release type, game setting, developers, publishers, and country of origin is provided where available. The table can be sorted by clicking on the small boxes next to the column headings.

== Legend ==
Video game platforms
DOS	PC DOS / MS-DOS, Windows 3.X	DS	Nintendo DS, DSiWare, iQue DS	GBA	Game Boy Advance, iQue GBA
GCN	GameCube	iOS	iOS, iPhone, iPod, iPadOS, iPad, visionOS, Apple Vision Pro	iPod	Term not found
LIN	Linux, SteamOS	MOBI	Mobile phone	NGE	N-Gage
PS1	PlayStation 1	PS2	PlayStation 2	PS3	PlayStation 3
PSN	PlayStation Network	PSP	PlayStation Portable	VC	Term not found
Wii	Wii, WiiWare, Wii Virtual Console	WIN	Windows, all versions Windows 95 and up	X360	(replace with XB360)
XBOX	(replace with XB)				

Types of releases
Compilation	A compilation, anthology or collection of several titles, usually (but not always) belonging to the same series
Early access	A game launched in early access is unfinished and thus might contain bugs and glitches or have some of the content missing
Episodic	An episodic video game that is released in batches over a period of time
Expansion	A large-scale DLC to an already existing game that adds new story, areas and additions and/or changes to the game's mechanics
Full release	A full release of a game that launched in early access first
Limited	A special release (often called "Limited" or "Collector's Edition") with bonus collector's material. Often provided to people who pre-order a game
Port	The game first appeared on a different platform and a port was made. The game is like the original, with few or no differences
Remake	The game is an enhanced remake of an original, made using a new engine and/or assets and thus containing completely new sound, graphics and possibly changes to the story and/or gameplay
Remaster	The game is a remaster of an original, released on the same or different platform, with (usually minor) changes to graphics, sound and/or gameplay
Rerelease	The game was re-released on the same platform with no or only minor changes

== List ==
Year	Title	Developer	Publisher	Setting	Platform	Series/Notes
2005 (JP)	3rd Super Robot Wars Alpha	Banpresto	Banpresto	Sci-Fi	PS2	
2005 (JP)	Angelic Vale Shinden: Ephemer Shima Kitare エンジェリックヴェール	Chrome Six		Fantasy	WIN	
2005 (KR); 2006 (NA/EU)	Astonishia Story	Sonnori		Fantasy	PSP (Port)	Port of Astonishia Story.
2005 (INT)	Battle for Wesnoth, The	N/A		Fantasy		Open source.
2005 (JP)	Battle Moon Wars 1	Werk		Fantasy	WIN	
2005 (RU); 2007 (NA)	Brigade E5: New Jagged Union	Apeiron	1C Company; Strategy First	Modern	WIN	Real-time.
2005 (JP)	Castle Fantasia: Elenshia Senki	Studio E-Go!		Fantasy	PS2	Sequel to Castle Fantasia 2: Seima Taisen.
2005 (NA)	Chronicles of Narnia: The Lion, the Witch and the Wardrobe, The	Starwave		Fantasy	MOBI	Based on the book and motion picture of the same name.
2005 (RU)	Cops 2170: The Power of Law – Gold Collection	MiST Land		Post-apocalyptic; Cyberpunk	WIN (Comp)	Compilation of Cops 2170: The Power of Law and its add-on.
2005 (JP)	Dragon Force; Sega Ages 2500, Vol.18: Dragon Force ドラゴンフォース	3D Ages	Sega	Fantasy	PS2 (Remake)	Remake of Dragon Force for SAT.
2005 (JP/NA/EU/AU)	Fire Emblem: Path of Radiance	Intelligent Systems	Nintendo	Fantasy	GCN	
2005 (NA/EU/AU)	Freedom Force vs The 3rd Reich	Irrational	Vivendi Universal	Superhero	WIN	Real-time. Sequel to Freedom Force.
2005 (JP)	Front Mission 5: Scars of the War	Square Enix	Square Enix	Sci-Fi	PS2	Sequel to Front Mission 4.
2005 (JP)	Generation of Chaos IV 新天魔界 〜GOC IV アナザサイド〜	Idea Factory	Idea Factory	Sci-Fi	PS1 (Port)	Port of Generation of Chaos IV for PS2. Sequel to Generation of Chaos III: Toki no Fuuin.
2005 (JP)	Generation of Chaos V 新天魔界ジェネレーションオブカオスV	Neverland	Idea Factory	Fantasy	PS2	Sequel to Generation of Chaos IV.
2005 (JP); 2006 (NA); 2007 (EU/AU)	Generation of Chaos	Neverland		Fantasy	PSP	
2005 (EU/NA)	Hammer & Sickle	Nival; Novik&Co	1C Company; CDV	Sci-Fi, Historical	WIN	Set in the Silent Storm universe.
2005 (NA)	High Seize	RedLynx	Nokia	Historical	NGE	
2005 (JP)	Langrisser III ラングリッサーIII	Taito		Fantasy	PS2 (Port)	Port of Langrisser III for SAT. Prequel to Warsong.
2005 (NA)	Lord of the Rings, The: Tactics	EA	EA	Fantasy	PSP	Based on The Lord of the Rings by J. R. R. Tolkien.
2005 (JP/NA/EU)	Makai Kingdom: Chronicles Of The Sacred Tome; Phantom Kingdom ファントム・キングダム	Nippon Ichi	Nippon Ichi	Fantasy	PS2	
2005 (NA/EU)	Metalheart: Replicants Rampage	Akella; NumLock	DreamCatcher; Akella	Post-apocalyptic	WIN	
2005 (JP)	Namco x Capcom	Monolith	Namco	Fantasy	PS2	Action.
2005 (RU); 2006 (NA)	Night Watch	Nival	CDV	Modern, Fantasy	WIN	Based on the Russian novel and film of the same name. Utilizes the Silent Storm engine.
2005 (??)	Rebelstar: Tactical Command	Codo	Namco	Sci-Fi	GBA	
2005 (JP)	Rebirth Moon リバースムーン	Idea Factory	Idea Factory	Fantasy	PS2	
2005 (??)	Rifts: Promise of Power	Backbone	Nokia	Fantasy	NGE	Based on the pen-and-paper role-playing game of the same name.
2005 (JP)	Sakura Taisen 3: Is Paris Burning? Sakura Taisen 3: Pari wa Moeteiru ka	Red; Overworks	Sega	Steampunk	PS2 (Port)	Port of Sakura Taisen 3: Pari wa Moeteiru ka for DC. Sequel to Sakura Taisen 2: Kimi, Shinitamou koto Nakare.
2005 (JP)	Sakura Taisen 4: Koi Seyo, Otome	Red; Overworks	Sega	Steampunk	WIN (Port)	Port of Sakura Taisen 4: Koi Seyo, Otome for DC. Sequel to Sakura Taisen 3.
2005 (JP)	Sakura Taisen V: Saraba, Itoshiki Hito yo	Red; Overworks	Sega	Steampunk	PS2	Sequel to Sakura Taisen 4.
2005 (NA)	Shadow Vault	Mayhem	Strategy First	Post-apocalyptic, Cyberpunk	WIN	
2005 (JP)	Shinseiki Genso: Spectral Souls II 新紀幻想スペクトラルソウルズII	Neverland	Idea Factory	Fantasy	PS2	Sequel to Shinseiki Genso: Spectral Souls.
2005 (JP)	Shinseiki Genso: SSII Unlimited Side 新紀幻想 ～SSII アンリミテッドサイド～	Idea Factory	Idea Factory	Fantasy	PSP	Part of the Spectral Souls series.
2005 (JP)	Shinseiki Yuusha Taisen	Mayhem Takara		Sci-Fi	PS2	
2005 (JP)	Spectral Force: Chronicle スペクトラルフォース クロニクル	Neverland	Idea Factory	Fantasy	PS2	
2005 (JP/NA); 2006 (EU)	Suikoden Tactics; Rhapsodia	Konami	Konami	Fantasy	PS2	Sequel to Suikoden IV.
2005 (JP); 2006 (NA)	Super Robot Taisen: Original Generation 2	Banpresto	Banpresto; Atlus	Sci-Fi	GBA	
2005 (JP)	Super Robot Wars Judgement	Banpresto	Banpresto	Sci-Fi	GBA	
2005 (JP)	Super Robot Wars MX Portable	Banpresto	Banpresto	Sci-Fi	PSP (Port)	Port of Super Robot Wars MX for PS2.
2005 (JP)	Tales of the World: Narikiri Dungeon 3			Fantasy	GBA	Sequel to Tales of the World: Narikiri Dungeon 2.
2005 (JP)	TearRing Saga Series: Berwick Saga ティアリングサーガシリーズ ベルウィックサーガ	Tirnanog	Enterbrain	Fantasy	PS2	Sequel to TearRing Saga.
2005 (JP)	Tears to Tiara	Leaf	Aquaplus	Fantasy	WIN	Real-time, Eroge. Series debuts.
2005 (JP)	Tir-nan-og V: Eternal Hitoshi ティル・ナ・ノーグV 〜悠久の仁〜	SystemSoft		Fantasy	WIN	Sequel to Tir-nan-og IV: King of the Valiant for WIN.
2005 (JP)	Twelve: Sengoku Fuushinden; Twelve 〜戦国封神伝〜	Konami		Fantasy, Historical	PSP	
2006 (JP)	Battle Moon Wars 2	Werk		Fantasy	WIN	Sequel to Battle Moon Wars 1.
2006 (JP)	Blazing Souls ブレイジングソウルズ	Idea Factory	Idea Factory	Fantasy	PS2	Sequel to Shinseiki Genso: Spectral Souls II.
2006 (JP); 2008 (NA)	Chaos Wars カオスウォーズ	Idea Factory	Idea Factory	Fantasy	PS2	
2006 (JP/NA/EU/AU)	Disgaea 2: Cursed Memories 魔界戦記ディスガイア2	Nippon Ichi	Nippon Ichi; Koei	Fantasy	PS2	Sequel to Disgaea: Hour of Darkness.
2006 (JP); 2007 (NA/EU)	Disgaea: Afternoon of Darkness	Nippon Ichi	Nippon Ichi; Atlus; Koei	Fantasy	PSP (Port)	Port of Disgaea: Hour of Darkness for PS2.
2006 (NA/EU/AU)	Field Commander	SOE	SOE	Modern	PSP	
2006 (JP)	Fire Emblem: Monshō no Nazo	Intelligent	Nintendo	Fantasy	VC (Port)	Port of Fire Emblem: Monsho no Nazo for SNES.
2006 (JP)	Generation of Chaos V イーディスメモリーズ 〜新天魔界GOCV〜	Neverland	Idea Factory	Fantasy	PS1 (Port)	Port of Generation of Chaos V for PS2. Sequel to Generation of Chaos IV.
2006 (UK)	Gorky 17; Odium	Metropolis	1C Company; TopWare; Monolith	Fantasy	LIN (Port)	Port of Gorky 17 for WIN.
2006 (JP); 2007 (NA); 2008 (PAL)	Growlanser: Heritage of War グローランサーV	CareerSoft	Atlus; Rising Star Games	Fantasy	PS2	Sequel to Growlanser IV: Wayfarer of the Time.
2006 (JP)	Higurashi no Naku Koro Tactics ひぐらしのなく頃に Tactics	Sora's Dream	Sora's Dream	Modern	MOBI	Based on the anime of the same name.
2006 (NA)	Jagged Alliance 2: Gold Pack	Sir-Tech	Strategy First	Modern	WIN (Rerel)	Re-release on Steam.
2006 (JP); 2007 (NA)	Jeanne d'Arc	Level-5	SCE	Fantasy	PSP	
2006 (JP)	Majin Tensei II: Spiral Nemesis 魔神転生II SPIRAL NEMESIS	i-revo		Fantasy	WIN (Port)	Sequel to Majin Tensei. Port of Majin Tensei II: Spiral Nemesis or Super Famicom.
2006 (JP)	Majin Tensei#Majin Tensei 魔神転生	i-revo		Fantasy	WIN (Port)	Port of Majin Tensei for Super Famicom.
2006 (JP)	Makai Wars	Nippon Ichi		Fantasy	PS3	
2006 (JP)	Prism Ark: Prism Heart II プリズム・アーク 〜プリズム・ハート エピソード2〜	Pajama Soft	Pajama Soft	Fantasy	WIN	Eroge.
2006 (JP)	Sakura Taisen 1&2	Red; Overworks	Sega	Steampunk	PSP (Comp)	Port and compilation of Sakura Taisen and Sakura Taisen 2 for SAT. Series debuts.
2006 (JP)	Sakura Taisen 2: Kimi, Shinitamou koto Nakare	Red; Overworks	Sega	Steampunk	PSP (Port)	Port of Sakura Taisen 2 for SAT. Sequel to Sakura Taisen.
2006 (JP)	Sakura Taisen	Red; Overworks	Sega	Steampunk	PSP (Port)	Series debuts. Port of Sakura Taisen for SAT
2006 (JP); 2008 (NA)	Spectral Force 3: Innocent Rage スペクトラルフォース3 イノセントレイジ	Idea Factory	Idea Factory; Atlus	Fantasy	X360	Sequel to Spectral Force II.
2006 (RU/EU); 2007 (INT)	Star Wolves 2	Xbow	1C Company	Sci-Fi	WIN	Real-time. Sequel to Star Wolves.
2006 (??)	Summon Night 4	Flight-Plan	Banpresto	Steampunk	PS2	Sequel to Summon Night 3.
2006 (JP)	Super Robot Wars Advance i	Banpresto	Banpresto	Sci-Fi	MOBI (Port)	Port of Super Robot Wars Advance for GBA.
2006 (JP)	Super Robot Wars XO	Banpresto	Banpresto	Sci-Fi	X360	
2006 (JP/NA)	Yggdra Union: We'll Never Fight Alone ユグドラ・ユニオン	Sting	Sting; Atlus	Fantasy	GBA	Sequel to Riviera: The Promised Land for WSC.
2007 (RU); 2008 (NA)	7.62	Apeiron	1C Company	Modern	WIN	Real-time. Sequel to Brigade E5: New Jagged Union.
2007 (JP)	Absolute: Blazing Infinity アブソリュート ブレイジングインフィニティ	Idea Factory	Idea Factory	Fantasy	X360 (Port)	Port of Blazing Souls for PS2.
2007 (JP)	Aedis Eclipse: Generation of Chaos	Neveralnd		Fantasy	PSP	Sequel to Generation of Chaos.
2007 (JP)	Apocalypse: Desire Next	Idea Factory		Fantasy	X360	
2007 (JP); TBD (NA)	ASH: Archaic Sealed Heat	Mistwalker; Racjin	Nintendo	Fantasy	DS	
2007 (JP)	Bahamut Senki	Sega	Sega	Fantasy	VC (Port)	Port of Bahamut Senki for SMS.
2007 (JP)	Battle Moon Wars 3	Werk		Sci-Fi	WIN	Sequel to Battle Moon Wars 2.
2007 (RU)	Day Watch	Nival		Modern, Fantasy	WIN	Sequel to Night Watch.
2007 (NA)	Disgaea: Afternoon of Darkness; Disgaea Portable	Nippon Ichi		Fantasy	PSP (Remake)	Remake of Disgaea: Hour of Darkness for PS2.
2007 (JP)	Dragon Knight IV ドラゴンナイト4	ELF	ELF	Fantasy	WIN (Remake)	Eroge. Sequel to Dragon Knight III. Port of Dragon Knight IV for PC98.
2007 (JP)	Dragon Shadow Spell ドラゴンシャドウスペル	Flight-Plan		Fantasy	PS2	
2007 (NA/EU/AU)	Dungeons & Dragons Tactics	Kuju	Atari	Fantasy	PSP	
2007 (JP)	Elvandia Story エルヴァンディアストーリー	Spike		Fantasy	PS2	
2007 (JP); 2008 (NA/PAL/AU)	Final Fantasy Tactics A2: Grimoire of the Rift ファイナルファンタジータクティクス A2 封穴のグリモア	Square Enix	Square Enix	Fantasy	DS	Sequel to Final Fantasy Tactics Advance for GBA.
2007 (JP/NA/EU/AU)	Final Fantasy Tactics: The War of the Lions	Square Enix	Square Enix	Fantasy	PSP (Remake)	Remake of Final Fantasy Tactics for PS1.
2007 (JP/NA); 2008 (PAL)	Final Fantasy XII: Revenant Wings	Square Enix	Square Enix	Fantasy	DS	Real-time. Continuation of Final Fantasy XII.
2007 (JP/NA); 2008 (EU/AU)	Fire Emblem: Radiant Dawn	Intelligent	Nintendo	Fantasy	Wii	Sequel to Fire Emblem: Path of Radiance.
2007 (JP)	Fire Emblem: Seisen no Keifu	Intelligent	Nintendo	Fantasy	VC (Port)	Port of Fire Emblem: Seisen no Keifu for SNES.
2007 (JP/NA)	Front Mission	Square Enix	Square Enix	Sci-Fi	DS (Remake)	Series debuts. Remake of Front Mission for SNES.
2007 (JP)	Growlanser VI: Precarious World	CareerSoft		Sci-Fi	PS2	Real-time. Sequel to Growlanser V: Generations.
2007 (RU); 2008 (EU); TBD (NA)	Hired Guns: The Jagged Edge	GFI Russia	Game Factory	Modern	WIN	
2007 (JP/NA/EU)	Hoshigami Remix	Arc System Works	ASNetworks; Aksys; 505	Fantasy	DS (Remake)	Remake of Hoshigami: Ruining Blue Earth for PS1.
2007 (NA)	Jagged Alliance 2: Gold Pack	Sir-Tech	Strategy First	Modern	WIN (Rerel)	Re-release on GameTap.
2007 (NA)	Jagged Alliance 2: Wildfire	I-Deal	Strategy First	Modern	WIN (Rerel)	Re-release on GamersGate.
2007 (JP)	Langrisser II; Der Langrisser ラングリッサーII			Fantasy	VC (Port)	Sequel to Warsong. Port of Langrisser II for GEN.
2007 (JP/NA/PAL)	Luminous Arc ルミナスアーク	Image Epoch	Marvelous; Atlus; Rising Star	Fantasy	DS	Series debuts.
2007 (JP)	Magician's Academy まじしゃんず・あかでみい	Enterbrain	Enterbrain	Modern, Fantasy	PS2	Based on the anime of the same name.
2007 (JP)	Majin Tensei: Blind Thinker 魔神転生 blind thinker		Atlus; BBMF	Fantasy	MOBI	
2007 (JP)	Mist of Chaos	Neverland		Fantasy	PS3	
2007 (JP); 2008 (NA)	Operation Darkness	Success		Fantasy, Historical	Xbox	
2007 (JP)	Prism Ark: Prism Heart II – Remastered Edition プリズム・アーク 〜プリズム・ハート エピソード2〜 (リマスター版)	Pajama Soft	Pajama Soft	Fantasy	WIN (Limit)	Eroge. Limited edition version of Prism Ark: Prism Heart II.
2007 (JP); 2010 (NA)	Record of Agarest War アガレスト戦記	Idea Factory	Compile Heart; Red	Fantasy	PS3, PSN, X360	
2007 (JP); 2008 (NA)	Rondo of Swords 偽りの輪舞曲	Success	Success	Fantasy	DS	
2007 (JP)	Seireiki Rayblade 聖霊機ライブレード	Winkysoft	Winkysoft	Sci-Fi	PSN (Port)	Port of Seireiki Rayblade for PS1.
2007 (JP/NA/PAL)	Shining Force: The Legacy of Great Intention; Shining Force シャイニング・フォース 神々の遺産		Sega	Fantasy	VC (Port)	Port of Shining Force: The Legacy of Great Intention for GEN.
2007 (JP/NA); 2008 (EU)	Soul Nomad & the World Eaters	Nippon Ichi	Nippon Ichi	Fantasy	PS2	
2007 (JP)	Spectral Gene	Idea Factory		Fantasy	PS2	
2007 (JP)	Super Robot Wars A Portable	Banpresto	Banpresto	Sci-Fi	PSP (Remake)	Remake of Super Robot Wars A for GBA.
2007 (JP)	Super Robot Wars Original Generation Gaiden	Banpresto	Banpresto	Sci-Fi	PS2	Sequel to Super Robot Wars Original Generations.
2007 (JP)	Super Robot Wars W	Banpresto	Banpresto	Sci-Fi	DS	
2007 (JP)	Super Robot Wars: Original Generations	Banpresto	Banpresto	Sci-Fi	PS2 (Remake)	Remake and compilation of Super Robot Wars: Original Generation and Super Robot Wars: Original Generation 2 for GBA.
2007 (JP)	Tears to Tiara: Kakan no Daichi	Leaf		Fantasy	PS3 (Port)	Port of Tears to Tiara.
2007 (JP)	Treasure Hunter G	Sting	Square	Fantasy	VC (Port)	Port of Treasure Hunter G for SNES.
2007 (NA/EU)	UFO: Extraterrestrials	Chaos Concept	Try Synergy; Paradox	Sci-Fi	WIN	Spiritual successor to X-COM.
2007 (??)	Urban Legend	ELENS		Sci-Fi	WIN	
2007 (JP); 2008 (NA)	Wild Arms XF ワイルドアームズ クロスファイア	Media.Vision	SCE	Steampunk	PSP	
2007 (NA)	X-COM: UFO Defense	Mythos	Take-Two Interactive	Sci-Fi	WIN (Rerel)	GameTap re-release.
2008 (NA)	Amateur Sergeon	Cartoon Network	Adult Swim	Fantasy	MOBI	
2008 (??)	Arc the Lad III	ARC		Fantasy	PSN (Port)	Port of Arc the Lad III.
2008 (JP)	Battle of Sunrise: Limited Edition バトル オブ サンライズ ~リミテッド エディション~	Sunrise	Sunrise	Sc-Fi	PS2 (Limit)	
2008 (JP)	Battle of Sunrise バトル オブ サンライズ	Sunrise	Sunrise	Sc-Fi	PS2	Limited edition version of Battle of Sunrise for PS2.
2008 (JP); 2009 (NA)	BLEACH: The 3rd Phantom	Treasure	Sega	Fantasy	DS	Based on the anime and manga of the same name.
2008 (JP); 2009 (NA)	Blue Dragon Plus	Feel Plus	AQ; Ignition	Fantasy	DS	Real-time.
2008 (JP/NA)	Disgaea 3: Absence of Justice 魔界戦記ディスガイア3	Nippon Ichi		Fantasy	PS3	Sequel to Disgaea 2: Cursed Memories.
2008 (NA); 2009 (PAL)	Disgaea DS; Makai Senki Disugaia Makai no Ōji to Akai Tsuki 魔界戦記ディスガイア 魔界の王子と赤い月	Nippon Ichi	Atlus	Fantasy	DS (Port)	Port of Disgaea: Afternoon of Darkness for PSP.
2008 (??)	Drone Tactics	Success	Atlus	Fantasy, Modern	DS	
2008 (JP/NA)	Eternal Poison; Poison Pink ポイズンピンク,	Flight-Plan	Banpresto; Atlus	Fantasy	PS2	
2008 (JP/EU); 2009 (NA)	Fire Emblem: Shadow Dragon	Intelligent	Nintendo	Fantasy	DS	Remake of Fire Emblem: Ankoku Ryū to Hikari no Ken for NES.
2008 (JP)	Fire Emblem: Thracia 776	Intelligent	Nintendo	Fantasy	VC (Port)	Port of Fire Emblem: Thracia 776 for SNES. Follow-up to Fire Emblem: Seisen no Keifu.
2008 (NA)	Jagged Alliance 2: Gold Pack	Sir-Tech	Strategy First	Modern	WIN (Rerel)	Re-release on GamersGate.
2008 (??)	King's Bounty: The Legend	Katauri	1C Company	Fantasy	WIN	Spiritual successor to King's Bounty.
2008 (JP); 2009 (NA)	Knights in the Nightmare	Sting	Sting; Atlus	Fantasy	DS	
2008 (JP/NA)	Luminous Arc 2: Will ルミナスアーク2 ウィル	Image Epoch	Marvelous	Fantasy	DS	Sequel to Luminous Arc.
2008 (JP)	Prism Ark: Prism Heart II プリズム・アーク 〜プリズム・ハート エピソード2〜	Pajama Soft	5pb.Games	Fantasy	PS2 (Port)	Eroge. Port of Prism Ark: Prism Heart II for WIN.
2008 (NA/EU)	Song Summoner: The Unsung Heroes	Square Enix	Square Enix	Fantasy	iPod	
2008 (JP)	Super Robot Wars A Portable	Banpresto	Banpresto	Sci-Fi	PSP (Remake)	Remake of Super Robot Wars A for GBA.
2008 (JP)	Tears to Tiara: Kakan no Daichi	Aquaplus	Aquaplus	Fantasy	PS3 (Port)	Eroge. Port of Tears to Tiara for Windows.
2008 (JP)	Tir-nan-og V	Alfa System		Fantasy	PS2 (Port), PSP (Port)	Port of Tir-nan-og V for WIN. Sequel to Tir-nan-og IV: King of the Valiant.
2008 (JP/NA/EU)	Valkyria Chronicles; Battlefield Valkyria: Gallian Chronicles 戦場のヴァルキュリア	Sega	Sega	Fantasy	PS3	
2008 (JP); 2009 (NA/EU)	Valkyrie Profile: Covenant of the Plume; Varukirī Purofairu Toga o Seou Mono ヴァルキリープロファイル 咎を背負う者	tri-Ace	Square Enix	Fantasy	DS	
2008 (INT)	X-COM: Compete Pack	MicroProse	2K Games	Sci-Fi	DOS (Comp), WIN (Comp)	Compilation of all X-COM titles to date.
2008 (NA)	X-COM: UFO Defense	Mythos	Take-Two Interactive	Sci-Fi	WIN (Rerel)	Steam re-release.
2008 (JP/NA)	Yggdra Union: We'll Never Fight Alone ユグドラ・ユニオン	Sting	Sting; Atlus	Fantasy	PSP (Port)	Port of Yggdra Union: We'll Never Fight Alone for GBA. Sequel to Riviera: The Promised Land for WSC.
2008 (JP/NA)	Zoids Assault	Atlus	Atlus	SciFi	X360	Part of the Zoids franchise.
2009 (NA/EU)	Jagged Alliance	Cypron	Empire	Modern	DS (Port)	Port of Jagged Alliance for Nintendo DS.
2009 (JP/NA)	Shin Megami Tensei: Devil Survivor; Megami Ibunroku Devil Survivor 女神異聞録デビルサバイバー	Atlus	Atlus	Sci-Fi	DS	
2009 (NA)	Song Summoner: The Unsung Heroes - Encore	Square Enix	Square Enix	Fantasy	iOS (Port)	Port of Song Summoner: The Unsung Heroes for iPod.
2009 (NA)	Spectral Force Genesis	Idea Factory	Ignition	Fantasy	DS	
