= Chaos Wars =

2006 video game

- North American cover art
- Developer: Idea Factory
- Publishers: JP: Idea Factory; NA: O~3 Entertainment
- Director: Masato Sato
- Producer: Norihisa Kochiwa
- Designer: Masato Sato
- Platform: PlayStation 2
- Release: JP: September 21, 2006; NA: June 3, 2008
- Genre: Tactical role-playing
- Mode: Single-player

Chaos Wars (カオスウォーズ, Kaosu Wōzu) is a tactical role-playing video game developed and published by Idea Factory for the PlayStation 2. It was originally released in Japan on September 21, 2006. It was localized and released in North America by O~3 Entertainment in 2008, where it gained infamy for its poor voice acting.

Promotional art for the game is by Kinu Nishimura. The game's opening theme "Shūtan no Ou to Isekai no Kishi ~The Endia & The Knights~" was done by Sound Horizon. In North America, the game was released on June 3, 2008 as a GameStop exclusive.

Chaos Wars is a crossover between several companies' role-playing video game series, including Aruze's Shadow Hearts, Atlus's Growlanser, Idea Factory's Blazing Souls and Spectral Souls: Resurrection of the Ethereal Empires, and RED Entertainment's Gungrave and Code of the Samurai.

== Story ==
Hyoma, the protagonist, has a dream of another world over a pillar of light coming from his family shrine that has been missing since his ancestor's time. The next day, he decides to take his two friends, Shizuku and Hayatemaru, to investigate the mountains where his dream took place. During their investigation, they find a cave with strange technology but as they are looking into it, the machines activate and a bright light appears, taking them to another world known as Endia.

When Hyoma transports to the world, he encounters a girl named Rin, the Gatekeeper of Endia, who is surrounded by summoned monsters. After Hyoma helps defeat the creatures the two introduce themselves, Hyoma rudely interrupting her and instead asks how to return to Tokyo. Before Rin could explain, more monsters appear. Hyoma and Rin run together, where they meet up with a friend of Rin's named Hiro. Afterwards, once safe, Rin explains that the walls are thick in this world, which is the reason that they have been taken from their world to this world. They are known as "Knights" because when people are taken to Endia, they obtain powers like any other.

When Hyoma asks how to get back to his world, Rin explains that there is no way to return. Hyoma doesn't accept this fact and decides to find a way, but there, they then encounter the "Luin", an Organization that is determined to find "Keys" (mechanisms used to open gates and to summon "knights") in order to make their "paradise". After they escape from them with the help of Rin, they are taken to an isle near another island named "Radiance Island". There, they find a vacant mansion with its own transporter and that is where their adventure begins.

== Characters ==
- Hyoma Kusaka: Hyoma is a high school freshman from Tokyo, Japan. He has a sour look, a sour attitude, a sour everything in fact. He is very rude to almost everyone he meets but does show compassion for his two friends and the exception of Knights he encounters. He was bored of his own world so being taken to another world is quite exciting for him.
- Hayatemaru Mudoin: Like Hyoma, Hayatemaru is a glasses wearing high school freshmen and a long childhood friend to Hyoma. Hayatemaru is a very carefree, funny guy but after being taken to Endia, he becomes more serious but still tries to keep every one in high spirits. Despite his seemingly harmless appearance, Hayatemaru is a black belt and skilled in sōjutsu. His name is sometimes shortened to Hayate.
- Shizuku: Shizuku is a childhood friend to Hyoma and Hayate. Despite being a senior in high school, she is the same age as both Hyoma and Hayatemaru and is a very caring and high spirited person. She always supports Hyoma, despite the fact he insults her most of the time due to her sometimes childish nature. She is very skilled in battle games and always carries around a harisen, which she uses to hit people on the head.
- Rin Sunroad: Rin is the "Gatekeeper" of the world of Endia. As a "Gatekeeper", her job is to monitor and keep track of data of "Knights" and other dimensions. Rin is a gentle and very knowledgeable young girl, trying her best to inform the Knights of her world despite Hyoma belittling her lack of knowledge that is out of her range. After Hyoma saves Rin from the Luin, she decides to travel with him to find answers to the world of Endia.
- Hiro: Hiro is a warrior of the world called Neverland and the daughter of the demon lord Janus, as well as the lead character of the Spectral Force series. Hiro came shortly before Hyoma where she met Rin when she was taken to Endia. Knowing nothing of this world, she tags along.
- Laru Branshen: Laru is the captain of the order of warriors known as "Kishidan", an order of soldiers trained to protect the people of Endia. Laru is a strong believer in justice and doing what's right but he is too firm sometimes. He begins to think that Hyoma and the others are with the Luin due to at one point, they try finding and using "Keys" to find a way home. At first he distrust them but after being rescued by Hyoma when the Luin kidnapped and brain washed him, he agrees to help them to their cause.

== Reception ==
Reception

Aggregate score
Aggregator	Score
Metacritic	64/100

Review scores
Publication	Score
Famitsu	26/40
IGN	7.5/10
PlayStation: The Official Magazine	2/5

Chaos Wars received "mixed" reviews according to the review aggregation website Metacritic. IGN commented that, "In truth it's probably one of Idea Factory's best efforts released here in the States, melding staples of the genre with more open, zippy little ideas." On a negative note, PlayStation: The Official Magazine said: "Chaos Wars might draw in some--like fans of the obscure games it's based on, especially those who long for the days of hand-drawn characters and tiny battlefields--but its old-school aesthetic isn't enough to make up for the lackluster production values and uninspired game play." In Japan, Famitsu gave it a score of two sevens and two sixes for a total of 26 out of 40.
