= Daisuke Namikawa =

Japanese voice actor (born 1976)

- 浪川 大輔
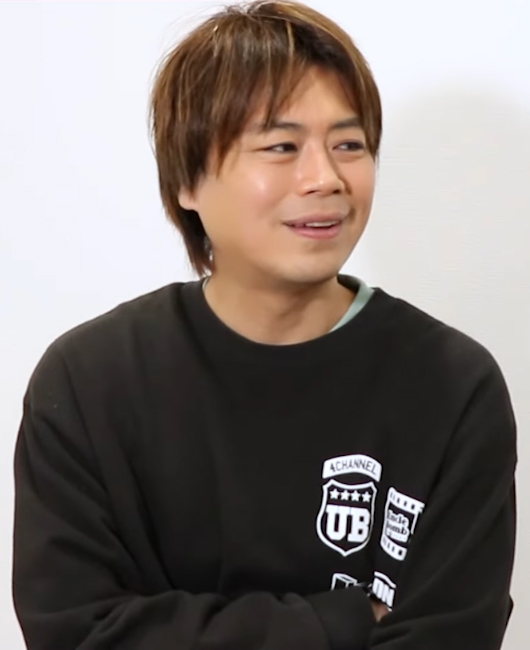
- Namikawa in 2022
- Born: April 2, 1976 (age 50); Tokyo, Japan
- Education: Tokyo International University
- Occupations: Actor; voice actor; singer
- Years active: 1984–present
- Agent: Stay Luck
- Musical career
- Genre: J-Pop
- Instrument: Vocals
- Years active: 2010–present
- Label: Kiramune
- Website: Official website

Daisuke Namikawa (浪川 大輔, Namikawa Daisuke; born April 2, 1976) is a Japanese actor and singer associated with Stay Luck. He began acting as a child and is sometimes mistaken with Daisuke Hirakawa, as their names only differ by one character when written in kanji. Despite his wide range of roles, he usually plays young heroes, such as Mikage in 07-Ghost, Fay D. Flourite in Tsubasa: Reservoir Chronicle, Jellal Fernandes and his counterpart Mystogan in Fairy Tail, Somnus Lucis Caelum in Final Fantasy XV, Jack the Ripper in Black Clover, Keita Ibuki in Black God, Goemon Ishikawa XIII in Lupin the Third, and Yu Narukami in Persona 4. He has also been cast as anti-heroes or antagonists, such as Ulquiorra Cifer in Bleach, Hisoka Morow in Hunter × Hunter (2011), Kei Kurono in Gantz, Eustass Kid in One Piece, Dr. Genus in One Punch Man, Chōsō in Jujutsu Kaisen, Tōru Oikawa in Haikyuu!!, Kishō Arima in Tokyo Ghoul, Momoshiki Otsutsuki in Boruto: Naruto Next Generations, and Kei Uzuki/X in Sakamoto Days.

He is the official Japanese dub-over voice artist for American actor Elijah Wood and Canadian actor Hayden Christensen. He has also dubbed over some roles performed by other actors such as Leonardo DiCaprio, Tony Jaa, Edward Furlong, and Kevin Zegers in Japanese. He made his directorial debut in Wonderful World, a live-action film that released in Japan in the early summer of 2010, he also starred in the film alongside Mamoru Miyano, Tomokazu Sugita, Tomokazu Seki, Rikiya Koyama, Yuka Hirata, Toshiyuki Morikawa, Kōichi Yamadera, Showtaro Morikubo and Yūko Kaida.

== Personal life ==
Namikawa married in 2001. On July 19, 2017, Shūkan Bunshun reported that Namikawa had been involved in an on-and-off extramarital affair with a female employee from his previous agency since 2004, whom he met when she had still been a teenager. Namikawa later confirmed the report and apologized.

== Filmography ==
=== Television animation ===
1993

- Nintama Rantarou as Takamaru Saito

1996

- Detective Conan as Shiro Ogata

1997

- Kero Kero Chime as Aoi

1998

- Yu-Gi-Oh! as Hayama

1999

- Arc the Lad as Elk

2000

- Saiyuki Reload as Kami-sama
- Yu-Gi-Oh! Duel Monsters as Ryota Kajiki

2001

- The Prince of Tennis as Chotaro Ohtori
- Legend of the Condor Hero as Yang Guo

2002

- Genma Wars as Jin
- Wagamama Fairy: Mirumo de Pon! (Charming edition) as Setsu Yūki
- Naruto as Sumaru

2003

- Beyblade G-Revolution as Hitoshi Kinomiya
- Dokkoider as Suzuo Sakurazaki/Dokkoida
- Onegai Twins (Please Twins!) as Maiku Kamishiro
- Ikki Tousen (Battle Vixens) as Toutaku Chuuei
- Gilgamesh as Tatsuya Madoka; Terumichi Madoka
- Maburaho as Mitsuaki Nanba

2004

- Superior Defender Gundam Force as Guneagle, Hogaremaru
- Hi no Tori (Phoenix) as Masato Yamanobe; Takeru
- Kyo Kara Maoh! as Ryan
- Melody of Oblivion as Kuron
- Gantz: First Stage as Kei Kurono
- Agatha Christie's Great Detectives Poirot and Marple as Constable Hearst; Chibo
- Gantz: Second Stage as Kei Kurono
- Beck: Mongolian Chop Squad as Yukio Tanaka
- Major as Joe Gibson Jr.

2005

- Tsubasa: Reservoir Chronicle as Fai D. Flourite
- Honey and Clover as Rokutarō
- Oku-sama wa Joshi Kōsei as Sonoda-sensei
- Full Metal Panic!: The Second Raid as Leonard Testarossa
- Idaten Jump as Kyoichi Shido

2006

- Utawarerumono as Benawi
- Ouran High School Host Club as Tetsuya Sendou
- .hack//Roots as Iyoten
- Ray the Animation as Koichi9
- Black Lagoon as Rock
- The Story of Saiunkoku as Eigetsu/Yogetsu To
- Musashi Gundoh as Musashi Miyamoto
- The Third as Iks
- Pokémon Diamond & Pearl as Lucian
- Bakumatsu Kikansetsu Irohanihoheto as Akizuki Yōjirō
- Katekyo Hitman Reborn! as Giotto/Vongola Primo; Future Sawada Tsunayoshi
- Tokyo Tribe2 as Kai
- Black Lagoon: The Second Barrage as Rock

2007

- D.Gray-man as Dodge
- Bleach as Ulquiorra Cifer
- Sisters of Wellber as Gallahad Eiger
- El Cazador de la Bruja as Miguel
- Blue Dragon as Jiro
- Hayate the Combat Butler as Schmidt hen Bach
- Wangan Midnight as Koichi Hiramoto
- Terra e... (Toward the Terra) as Leo
- The Story of Saiunkoku Second Series as Eigetsu/Yogetsu To
- Mononoke as Sogen
- Shigurui: Death Frenzy as Gennosuke Fujiki
- Mobile Suit Gundam 00 as Michael Trinity
- MapleStory as Ariba
- My Bride is a Mermaid as Yoshiuo Minamoto

2008

- Persona -trinity soul- as Tōma Shikura
- Spice and Wolf as Zheren'
- Nabari no Ō as Thobari Kumohira Durandal
- Blade of the Immortal as Araya Kawakami
- The Mōryō's Box as Morihiko Toriguchi
- Katekyo Hitman Reborn! as Giotto
- Katekyo Hitman Reborn! as TYL! Sawada Tsunayoshi

2009

- Hajime No Ippo: New Challenger as Itagaki Manabu
- Kurokami: The Animation as Keita Ibuki
- Hetalia: Axis Powers as Italy and Romano (South Italy)
- Hanasakeru Seishōnen as Rumaty Ihvan di Raginei/Machaty Sheik di Raginei
- 07 Ghost as Mikage
- Kimi ni Todoke as Shōta Kazehaya
- Kobato as Ginsei and Fai D. Flourite
- Fairy Tail as Siegrain/Jellal, Mystogan
- One Piece as Eustass Kid

2010

- Fullmetal Alchemist: Brotherhood as Young Hohenheim
- Hetalia: World Series as N. and S.Italy (Veneziano and Romano)
- Battle Spirits Brave as Barone The Moonlight
- Senkou no Night Raid (Night Raid 1931) as Kazura Iha
- House of Five Leaves as Masanosuke Akitsu
- Sarai-ya Goyou as Masanosuke Akitsu
- Mitsudomoe as Gachi Ranger Blue
- Sengoku Basara II as Miyamoto Musashi
- Doraemon as Johann Marusheru

2011

- Kimi ni Todoke 2nd Season as Shota Kazehaya
- Level E as Prince
- Little Battlers Experience as Kazuya Aoshima
- Gyakkyō Burai Kaiji: Hakairoku-hen as Seiya Ichijou
- Yondemasu yo, Azazel-san. as Akutabe
- Fate/zero as Waver Velvet
- Persona 4: The Animation as Yu Narukami, Izanagi (I am thou)
- Hunter × Hunter (2011) as Hisoka Morow

2012

- Area no Kishi as Oda Ryoma
- Aquarion Evol as Schrade
- Daily Lives of High School Boys as Motoharu
- Little Battlers Experience W as Kazuya Aoshima
- From the New World as Squealer
- Lupin the Third: The Woman Called Fujiko Mine as Goemon Ishikawa XIII
- Magic Kaito Special as Gunter von Goldenberg (Spider)
- Persona 4: The Animation as Yu Narukami
- Hiiro no Kakera as Yūichi Komura
- Fate/Zero 2 as Waver Velvet
- Medaka Box as Koki Akune
- Zetman as Jin Kanzaki
- K (anime) as Isana Yashiro/Adolf K. Weismann
- Kamisama Kiss as Dragon King Sukuna
- The New Prince of Tennis as Chotaro Ohtori

2013

- Valvrave the Liberator as Satomi Renbokoji
- Hetalia: The Beautiful World as North and South Italy
- Yondemasu yo, Azazel-san Z as Akutabe
- Little Battlers Experience Wars as Rikuya Tougou
- Devil Survivor 2: The Animation as Jungo Torii
- Arata: The Legend as Hiruko
- Brothers Conflict as Iori Asahina
- Fate/kaleid liner Prisma Illya as Lord El-Melloi II (Waver Velvet)
- Sunday Without God as Hampnie Hambart / Kizuna Astin
- Servant x Service as Hasebe's dad
- Ace of Diamond as Chris Yuu Takigawa
- Gatchaman Crowds as Jou Hibiki
- One Piece as Eustass Kid
- Hakkenden: Eight Dogs of the East as Osaki Kaname
- TRAiN HEROES as Aru

2014

- Soredemo Sekai wa Utsukushii as Lani Aristes
- Haikyū!! as Tōru Oikawa
- Baby Steps as Takuma Egawa
- Magical Warfare as Kazuma Ryūsenji
- Persona 4: The Golden Animation as Yu Narukami
- Shounen Hollywood as President
- Space Dandy as Carpaccio
- Tokyo Ghoul as Kishou Arima
- Garo: Honō no Kokuin as Leon Luis
- Yu-Gi-Oh! Arc-V as Leo Akaba
- The New Prince of Tennis OVA vs Genius 10 as Chotaro Ohtori

2015

- Parasyte as Miki
- Baby Steps Season 2 as Takuma Egawa
- Garo: Guren no Tsuki as Fujiwarano Yasusuke
- Gintama° as Hitotsubashi Nobunobu
- Haikyū!! 2 as Tōru Oikawa
- Hetalia: World Twinkle as North Italy
- Kare Baka as Ponta Ninomiya
- K: Return of Kings as Yashiro Isana
- My Love Story!! as Hayato Oda
- One-Punch Man as Pig God, Doctor Genus
- Prison School as Jōji "Joe" Nezu
- The Heroic Legend of Arslan as Narsus
- Tokyo Ghoul √A as Kishou Arima
- Ushio and Tora as Hyou
- World Trigger as Kei Tachikawa

2016

- Grimgar of Fantasy and Ash as Kikkawa
- Twin Star Exorcists as Arima Tsuchimikado
- Concrete Revolutio: Choujin Gensou Season 2 as Yoshiaki Satomi
- Beyblade Burst as Zenkuro "Zac" Kurogane/Zac the Sunshine
- Days as Hisahito Mizuki
- ReLIFE as Nobunaga Asaji
- Pokémon Sun & Moon as Rotom Pokédex

2017

- Fate/Apocrypha as Lord El-Melloi II
- The Ancient Magus' Bride as Lindel
- Aho Girl as Dog
- Tsuredure Children as Shinichi Katori
- Hand Shakers as voice of god
- Onihei as Tatsuzō
- Katsugeki/Touken Ranbu as Oodenta Mitsuyo
- Black Clover as Jack the Ripper

2018

- Hakata Tonkotsu Ramens as Jirō
- Hakyū Hoshin Engi as Chuu Ou
- Boruto: Naruto Next Generations as Momoshiki Ōtsutsuki
- Hugtto! PreCure as Uchifuji
- Touken Ranbu: Hanamaru 2 as Odenta Mitsuyo
- Violet Evergarden as Gilbert Bougainvillea
- Tokyo Ghoul:re as Kishou Arima
- Pop Team Epic as Pipimi
- Mr. Tonegawa: Middle Management Blues as Seiya Ichijou
- Full Metal Panic! Invisible Victory as Leonard Testarossa
- The Thousand Musketeers as Napoleon

2019

- W'z as Fumiyuki
- Meiji Tokyo Renka as Ogai Mori
- Shinkansen Henkei Robo Shinkalion as Kirin
- Demon Slayer: Kimetsu no Yaiba as Haganezuka
- Kono Oto Tomare! Sounds of Life as Suzuka Takinami
- One-Punch Man 2 as Pig God
- Star-Myu: High School Star Musical 3 as Touma Shiki
- Magical Sempai as Maa-kun
- The Ones Within as Ichiya Niki
- The Case Files of Lord El-Melloi II: Rail Zeppelin Grace Note as Lord El-Melloi II
- Kengan Ashura as Setsuna Kiryū
- Ahiru no Sora as Katsumi Takahashi
- Black Clover as Kirsch Vermillion

2020

- Sorcerous Stabber Orphen as Childman Powderfield
- ARP Backstage Pass as Eiji Kanō
- Cagaster of an Insect Cage as Griffith
- The 8th Son? Are You Kidding Me? as Alfred
- Wave, Listen to Me! as Mitsuo Suga
- Is It Wrong to Try to Pick Up Girls in a Dungeon? III as Dix Perdix
- Digimon Adventure: as Yamato "Matt" Ishida
- BNA: Brand New Animal as Pinga
- The God of High School as Park Mu-Jin
- The Gymnastics Samurai as Shōtarō Aragaki
- Pocket Monsters as Ash's Lucario, Koharu's Pokédex
- Yu-Gi-Oh! Sevens as Otes

2021

- Ex-Arm as Soushi Shiga
- Mushoku Tensei: Jobless Reincarnation as Ruijerd Superdia
- Re:Zero − Starting Life in Another World as Arch
- So I'm a Spider, So What? as Black
- World Trigger 2nd Season as Kei Tachikawa
- Jujutsu Kaisen as Chōsō (ep. 24)
- Hetalia: World Stars as Italy and Romano (South Italy)
- Edens Zero as James Holloway
- Scarlet Nexus as Kagero Donne
- Tokyo Revengers as Ran Haitani
- Takt Op. Destiny as Shindler
- Lupin the 3rd Part 6 as Goemon Ishikawa XIII

2022

- Salaryman's Club as Masahiko Utsugi
- Fanfare of Adolescence as Yoshihisa Kuji
- Eternal Boys as Tsuyoshi Imagawa

2023

- Nier: Automata Ver1.1a as Adam
- Tōsōchū: The Great Mission as Satoshi Tsukimura
- Rokudo's Bad Girls as Masaru Hinomoto/Colonel
- Horimiya: The Missing Pieces as Takeru Sengoku
- Jujutsu Kaisen 2nd Season as Chōsō
- Fate/strange Fake: Whispers of Dawn as Lord El-Melloi II
- I'm in Love with the Villainess as Thane Bauer
- A Playthrough of a Certain Dude's VRMMO Life as Taichi Tanaka
- MF Ghost as Daigo Ōishi
- Tokyo Revengers: Tenjiku Arc as Ran Haitani
- The Eminence in Shadow 2nd Season as Gettan

2024

- Sasaki and Peeps as French
- Kimi ni Todoke 3rd Season as Shota Kazehaya
- That Time I Got Reincarnated as a Slime 3rd Season as Damrada
- Demon Lord 2099 as Graham
- Orb: On the Movements of the Earth as Count Piast (young)

2025

- Even Given the Worthless "Appraiser" Class, I'm Actually the Strongest as Zoid
- Babanba Banban Vampire as Ranmaru Mori
- Sakamoto Days as Kei Uzuki / X (Slur)
- Blue Exorcist: The Blue Night Saga as Shiro Fujimoto (young)
- Classic Stars as Ao Miharagi
- Shabake as Nozoki Byōbu
- Si-Vis: The Sound of Heroes as Yosuke

2026

- Jujutsu Kaisen 3rd Season as Chōsō
- Fate/strange Fake as Lord El-Melloi II
- Petals of Reincarnation as Hans U. Rudel
- My Ribdiculous Reincarnation as Master Sockeye Salmon
- Liar Game as Solario
- Sekiro: No Defeat as Wolf
- Magic Repo Man as Roger

=== OVAs/ONAs ===
- Mobile Suit Gundam 0080: War in the Pocket (1989) as Alfred Izuruha
- Mobile Suit Gundam Unicorn (2010) as Riddhe Marcenas
- Fairy Tail (2011) OVA 2 and 5 as Jellal Fernandes, Mystogan and Siegrain
- Tokyo Ghoul: JACK (2015) as Kishou Arima
- Final Fantasy XV: Episode Ardyn Prologue (2019) as Somnus Lucis Caelum
- JoJo's Bizarre Adventure: Stone Ocean (2022) as Narciso Anasui, Anakiss
- Lupin the 3rd vs. Cat's Eye (2023) as Goemon Ishikawa XIII
- Record of Ragnarok II (2023) as Beelzebub
- Onmyōji (2023) as Abe no Seimei
- The Grimm Variations (2024) as Grey

Unknown date

- Iriya no Sora, UFO no Natsu as Naoyuki Asaba
- Kyō, Koi o Hajimemasu as Kyota Tsubaki
- Last Order: Final Fantasy VII as Turks (Rod)
- Lupin: Blood Seal -Eternal Mermaid- as Goemon Ishikawa
- Legend of Toki as Bat
- Mobile Suit Gundam Seed Destiny Special Edition as Youlant Kent
- Model Suit Gunpla Builders Beginning G as Boris Schauer
- Murder Princess as Prince Kaito/The Dark Knight
- Onegai Twins (Please Twins!) as Maiku Kamishiro
- Sol Bianca as Rim
- Someday's Dreamers: Summer Skies as Kouji Kuroda
- Tsubasa Tokyo Revelations as Fai D. Flourite
- Tsubasa: Spring Thunder as Fai D. Flourite
- Yondemasu yo, Azazel-san. as Akutabe
- The Prince of Tennis OVA: The National Tournament as Chotaro Ohtori
- The New Prince of Tennis OVA as Chotaro Ohtori

=== Theatrical animation ===
- Fair, then Partly Piggy (1988), Noriyasu Hatakeyama / Spencer Weinberg-Takahama
- Zeta Gundam A New Translation: Heirs to the Stars (2005), Katz Kobayashi
- Zeta Gundam A New Translation II: Lovers (2005), Katz Kobayashi
- Pokémon: Lucario and the Mystery of Mew (2005), Lucario
- The Princess in the Birdcage Kingdom (2005), Fai D. Flourite
- Legend of Raoh: Chapter of Death in Love (2006), Bat
- Zeta Gundam A New Translation III: Love is the Pulse of the Stars (2006), Katz Kobayashi
- Legend of Raoh: Chapter of Fierce Fight (2007), Bat
- Bleach: Hell Verse (2010), Ulquiorra Cifer
- Hetalia: Axis Powers – Paint it, White! (2010), North and South Italy.
- The Prince of Tennis: Tennis no Ouji-sama Eikoku-shiki Teikyū-jō Kessen! (2011), Chotaro Ohtori
- Bayonetta: Bloody Fate (2013), Luka Redgrave
- Hunter × Hunter: Phantom Rouge (2013), Hisoka Morow
- Hunter × Hunter: The Last Mission (2013), Hisoka Morow
- Lupin the 3rd vs. Detective Conan: The Movie (2013), Goemon Ishikawa
- K: Missing Kings (2014), Yashiro Isana
- Saint Seiya: Legend of Sanctuary (2014), Aquarius Camus
- Boruto: Naruto the Movie (2015), Momoshiki Ōtsutsuki
- Crayon Shin-chan: My Moving Story! Cactus Large Attack! (2015), Mariachi
- Gekijōban Meiji Tokyo Renka: Yumihari no Serenade (2015), Ōgai Mori
- Digimon Adventure tri. (2015), Daigo Nishijima
- Maho Girls PreCure! the Movie: The Miraculous Transformation! Cure Mofurun! (2016), Dark Matter and Kumata
- Lupin the IIIrd: Goemon Ishikawa's Blood Spray (2017), Goemon Ishikawa
- Doraemon the Movie 2017: Great Adventure in the Antarctic Kachi Kochi (2017), Professor Hyakkoi
- Avengers Confidential: Black Widow & Punisher – Amadeus Cho
- Lupin III: The First (2019), Goemon Ishikawa
- A Whisker Away (2020), Tomoya Sakaguchi
- Violet Evergarden: The Movie (2020), Gilbert Bougainvillea
- Black Clover: Sword of the Wizard King (2023), Jack The Ripper
- Gekijōban Collar × Malice Deep Cover (2023), Takeru Sasazuka

=== Video games ===
1997

- Everybody's Golf as Iceman

1999

- Dragon Slayer Jr: Romancia as Prince Fan Freddy

2001

- Growlanser III: The Dual Darkness as Slayn; Grey Gilbert

2002

- Panzer Dragoon Orta as Mobo
- The Lord of the Rings: The Two Towers as Frodo Baggins (Japanese dub)
- Utawarerumono as Benawi

2003

- The Lord of the Rings: The Return of the King as Frodo Baggins (Japanese dub)

2004

- Prince of Tennis 2005: Crystal Drive as Chōtarō Ōtori
- Prince of Tennis: Rush and Dream as Chōtarō Ōtori
- Saiyuki Gunlock as Kami-sama
- Sakura Wars: Mysterious Paris as Kojirō Akechi

2005

- Beck the Game as Yukio Tanaka
- Bleach: Shattered Blade as Ulquiorra Cifer
- Gantz: The Game as Kei Kurono
- Genji: Dawn of the Samurai as Minamoto Yoshitsune
- Kenka Banchou as Yasuo Tanaka
- Kino no Tabi II -the Beautiful World- as Sei
- Sengoku Basara as Miyamoto Musashi
- Prince of Tennis: Gakuensai no Oujisama as Chōtarō Ōtori

2006

- .hack//G.U. as Iyoten; Hetero
- Baten Kaitos II as Sagi
- Bleach: Heat the Soul 3 as Ulquiorra Cifer
- Blue Dragon as King Gibral
- Genji: Days of the Blade as Minamoto Yoshitsune
- Hiiro no Kakera as Komura Yuuichi
- Kurohime as Zero
- Otometeki Koi Kakumei Love Revo!! as Ayato Kamishiro
- Sengoku Basara 2 as Miyamoto Musashi
- Suikoden V as Main character A, Euram Barrows, Nick, Ernst
- Prince of Tennis: Doki Doki Survival – Sanroku no Mystic as Chōtarō Ōtori
- Tsubasa Chronicle Vol. 2 as Fai D. Flourite
- Utawarerumono Chiriyuku Mono e no Komoriuta as Benawi

2007

- Angel Profile as Mikhail
- Another Century's Episode 3 The Final as Barrel Orland; Berckt
- Bleach: Blade Battlers 2nd as Ulquiorra Cifer
- Bleach: Heat the Soul 4 as Ulquiorra Cifer
- Hetalia Academy as Italy
- Hiiro no Kakera ~Ano Sora no Shita de~ as Komura Yuuichi
- Hisui no Shizuku Hiiro no Kakera 2 as Komura Yuuichi
- Kenka Banchou 2 Full Throttle as Akira Kisaragi
- Mana Khemia: Alchemists of Al-Revis as The Other Vayne
- Odin Sphere as Cornelius
- Otomedius as Emon Five
- Rezel Cross as Airu
- Sengoku Basara 2 Heroes as Miyamoto Musashi
- SD Gundam GGeneration Spirits as Katz Kobayashi, Narration
- Prince of Tennis: CARD HUNTER as Chōtarō Ōtori
- Prince of Tennis: Doki Doki Survival – Umibe no Secret as Chōtarō Ōtori

2008

- Bleach: Heat the Soul 5 as Ulquiorra Cifer
- Bleach: Soul Carnival as Ulquiorra Cifer
- Bleach: The 3rd Phantom as Ulquiorra Cifer
- Bleach: Versus Crusade as Ulquiorra Cifer
- Duel Love as Yuki Jin
- Mobile Suit Gundam 00 as Michael Trinity
- Persona 4 as Protagonist (Yu Narukami)
- Prince of Persia as Prince (Japanese dub)
- Soukoku no Kusabi Hiiro no Kakera 3 as Komura Yuuichi
- Star Ocean: Second Evolution as Claude C. Kenny
- Super Robot Wars Z as Katz Kobayashi
- Super Smash Bros. Brawl as Lucario
- Way of the Samurai 3 as Protagonist
- White Knight Chronicles as Leonard

2009

- Bayonetta as Luka Redgrave
- Bleach: Heat the Soul 6 as Ulquiorra Cifer
- Bleach: Soul Carnival2 as Ulquiorra Cifer
- Bloody Call as Cain
- Dengeki Gakuen RPG: Cross of Venus as Naoyuki Asaba
- Enkaku Sōsa: Shinjitsu e no 23 Nichikan as Itsuki Nanashiba
- Hiiro no Kakera Shin Tamaihime Denshou as Komura Yuuichi
- Kimi ni Todoke ~Sodateru Omoi~ (Shota Kazehaya)
- One Piece: Unlimited Cruise Episode 2 as Eustass Kid
- Saikin Koi Shiteru? as Rei Kagami
- SD Gundam GGeneration Wars as Katz Kobayashi, Michael Trinity
- Sengoku Basara: Battle Heroes as Miyamoto Musashi
- Tales of Graces as Richard
- Prince of Tennis: Doubles no Oujisama – Girls, be gracious! as Chōtarō Ōtori

2010

- .hack//Link as lyoten, Adamas
- Bleach: Heat the Soul 7 as Ulquiorra Cifer
- Call of Duty: Black Ops as Chief Petty Officer Joseph Bowman
- CLOCK ZERO ~Shuuen no Ichibyou~ as Takato Kaido/Akira Kaga/King
- Estpolis: The Lands Cursed by the Gods as Hydekar
- God of War III as Helios
- Gundam Assault Survive as Michael Trinity
- Mobile Suit Gundam: Extreme Vs. as Riddhe Marcenas
- One Piece: Gigant Battle! as Eustass Kid
- STORM LOVER as Mao Ikari
- Summon Night Granthese: Sword of Ruin and the Knight's Promise as Asnurz
- Super Robot Wars Z II as Michael Trinity
- Tales of Graces f as Richard
- Zangeki no Reginleiv as Frøy

2011

- Bleach: Soul Resurrección as Ulquiorra Cifer
- Fairy Tail Gekitotsu! Kardia Daiseidou as Mystogan and Jellal Fernandes
- Gachitora! The Roughneck Teacher in High School as Sho Ishikawa
- Hiiro no Kakera Aizō-ban ~Akane-iro no Tsuioku~ as Komura Yuuichi
- Hiiro no Kakera Shin Tamaihime Denshou -Piece of Future- as Komura Yuuichi
- Kimi ni Todoke ~Tsutaeru Kimochi~ (Shota Kazehaya)
- One Piece: Gigant Battle!2 as Eustass Kid
- SD Gundam GGeneration 3D as Michael Trinity, Riddhe Marcenas, Boris Schauer
- SD Gundam GGeneration World as Katz Kobayashi, Michael Trinity, Riddhe Marcenas
- Sengoku Basara: Chronicle Heroes as Miyamoto Musashi
- Shin Megami Tensei: Devil Survivor 2 as Jungo Torii
- Starry☆Sky ~after summer~ as Izuru Yarai
- STORM LOVER: Summer Love!! as Mio Ikari
- Prince of Tennis: Doki Doki Survival – Umi to Yama no Love Passion as Chōtarō Ōtori
- TOKYO Yamanote BOYS DARK CHERRY as Jesus Rudou
- TOKYO Yamanote BOYS HONEY MILK as Jesus Rudou
- TOKYO Yamanote BOYS SUPER MINT as Jesus Rudou
- White Knight Chronicles II as Leonard

2012

- Armored Core V as RD
- Assassin's Creed III as Ratonhnhaké:ton
- Fairy Tail: Zeref's Awakening as Mystogan and Jellal Fernandes
- Black Panther 2: Yakuza Asura Chapter as Ryusho Kuki
- Brothers Conflict: Passion Pink as Iori Asahina
- Dragon Age II as Hawke (Japanese dub)
- Hunter x Hunter: Wonder Adventure as Hisoka Morow
- Persona 4: Arena as Yu Narukami
- Persona 4 Golden as Protagonist (Yu Narukami)
- Project X Zone as Rikiya Busujima
- Resident Evil 6 as Jake Muller
- Rune Factory 4 as Vishnal
- SD Gundam GGeneration Over World as Katz Kobayashi, Michael Trinity, Riddhe Marcenas, Boris Schauer
- Ys: Memories of Celceta as Ozma

2013

- Brothers Conflict: Brilliant Blue as Iori Asahina
- Dragon's Dogma: Dark Arisen as Julien
- God Eater 2 as Julius Visconti
- JoJo's Bizarre Adventure: All-Star Battle as Giorno Giovanna
- Koibana Days: Pure Flower Garden as Tsubaki Saotome
- Persona 4 Arena Ultimax as Yu Narukami
- STORM LOVER 2nd as Mio Ikari

2014

- Bayonetta 2 as Luka Redgrave
- Etrian Odyssey 2 Untold: The Fafnir Knight as Flavio
- Fate/hollow ataraxia as Waver Velvet
- Gakuen K -Wonderful School Days- as Yashiro Isana
- Hajime no Ippo: The Fighting! as Manabu Itagaki
- J-Stars Victory VS as Hisoka Morow
- Persona Q: Shadow of the Labyrinth as Protagonist (Yu Narukami)
- Phantasy Star Nova as Reven
- Super Robot Wars Z III as Katz Kobayashi, Riddhe Marcenas, Shrade Elan
- Super Smash Bros. for Nintendo 3DS and Super Smash Bros. for Wii U as Lucario

2015

- Bravely Second: End Layer as Yew Geneolgia
- CLOCK ZERO ~Shuuen no Ichibyou~ ExTime as Takato Kaido/Akira Kaga/King
- Fate/Grand Order as Zhuge Liang/Lord El-Melloi II, Hōzōin Inshun
- God Eater 2: Rage Burst as Julius Visconti
- JoJo's Bizarre Adventure: Eyes of Heaven as Giorno Giovanna
- Persona 4: Dancing All Night as Yu Narukami
- Reine des Fleurs as Louis
- Root Rexx as Kaoru Kanzaki
- Sengoku Basara 4 Sumeragi as Miyamoto Musashi
- Shin Megami Tensei: Devil Survivor 2 – Record Breaker as Jungo Torii
- Tokyo Ghoul: Jail as Kisho Arima
- Utawarerumono: The False Faces as Benawi
- Vamwolf Cross as Shuichi Aoi
- Xenoblade Chronicles X as voice for Custom Male Avatar

2016

- Black Rose Valkyrie as Asahi Shiramine
- Collar × Malice as Takeru Sasazuka
- Phoenix Wright: Ace Attorney - Spirit of Justice as Nayuta Sadmadhi

2017

- Nier: Automata as Adam
- Xenoblade Chronicles 2 as Mikhail

2018

- BlazBlue: Cross Tag Battle as Yu Narukami (Persona 4)
- Super Smash Bros. Ultimate as Mimikyu, Lucario

2019

- Kingdom Hearts III as Eraqus (young)
- Final Fantasy XV: Episode Ardyn as Somnus Lucis Caelum
- Sekiro: Shadows Die Twice as Sekiro
- Saint Seiya Awakening as Capricorn Shura and Lizard Misty
- 13 Sentinels: Aegis Rim as Ei Sekigahara

2020

- Another Eden as Zeviro

2021

- Blazblue Alternative: Dark War as Kagura Mutsuki

2022

- JoJo's Bizarre Adventure: All Star Battle R as Narciso Anasui
- Cookie Run: Kingdom as Affogato Cookie
- Bayonetta 3 as Luka

2023

- JoJo's Bizarre Adventure: Last Survivor as Narciso Anasui

2025

- The Hundred Line: Last Defense Academy as Yugamu Omokage
- The Red Bell's Lament as Garrett Welkin

2026

- Dark Auction as Edgar Schultz

2027

- Persona 4 Revival as Protagonist

=== Tokusatsu ===
- Tokusou Sentai Dekaranger (2004) as Leonian Gyoku Rou (ep. 47, 50)
- Mahou Sentai Magiranger (2005) as Absolute God N-Ma (eps. 46 – 49)
- Engine Sentai Go-onger (2008) as Engine Speedor
- Engine Sentai Go-onger: Boom Boom! Bang Bang! GekijōBang!! (2008) as Engine Speedor
- Engine Sentai Go-onger vs. Gekiranger (2009) as Engine Speedor
- Samurai Sentai Shinkenger vs. Go-onger: GinmakuBang!! (2010) as Engine Speedor
- Kaizoku Sentai Gokaiger (2011) as Engine Speedor
- Ressha Sentai ToQger Returns: Super ToQ 7gou of Dreams (2015) as Track Maintenance Worker (Actor) /Tank Top Shadow (Voice)
- Uchu Sentai Kyuranger (2017) as Cuervo (ep. 24 – 25, 38, 41, 44)

=== Film ===
- Kami Voice (2011) as Kuon Kobayakawa
- Sono Koe no Anata e (2022) as himself

=== TV dramas ===
- Koe Girl! (2018) as himself

=== Drama CDs ===
- Amari Sensei no Karei na Seminar
- Bleach Beat collection as Ulquiorra Cifer
- Castlevania: Nocturne of Recollection as Alexis
- Cinderella as Cinderella
- DAISUKE! as Wakaba Daisuke
- Dot Kareshi as Knight/Yuusha
- Hetalia: Axis Powers as Italy; Romano
- Itazura na Kiss as Naoki Irie
- Kimi to Naisho no... Kyo Kara Kareshi as Takashi Yuuki
- Lip on my Prince as Seiya Kitano
- Lupin III as Goemon Ishikawa XIII
- My Little Monster as Kenji Yamaguchi
- Parfait Tic! as Ichi Shinpo
- Requiem of the Rose King as Henry VI
- Special A as Yahiro Saiga
- Tsubasa Character Songs as Fai D. Flourite
- Vanquish Brothers as Masamune
- Voice Over! Seiyu Academy as Mitchell "Mitch" Zaizen

== Dubbing roles ==
=== Voice-doubles ===
- Elijah Wood
  - The Lord of the Rings: The Fellowship of the Ring – Frodo Baggins
  - The Lord of the Rings: The Two Towers – Frodo Baggins
  - The Lord of the Rings: The Return of the King – Frodo Baggins
  - Eternal Sunshine of the Spotless Mind – Patrick
  - Green Street – Matthew 'Matt' Buckner
  - Bobby – William Avary
  - 9 – 9
  - The Hobbit: An Unexpected Journey – Frodo Baggins
  - Maniac – Frank Zito
  - Grand Piano – Tom Selznick
  - Cooties – Clint Hadson
  - Over the Garden Wall – Wirt
  - The Last Witch Hunter – Dolan 37
  - I Don't Feel at Home in This World Anymore – Tony
  - Come to Daddy – Norval
  - The Monkey – Ted Hammerman
- Tony Jaa
  - Ong-Bak: Muay Thai Warrior – Ting
  - The Bodyguard – Wong Kom
  - Tom-Yum-Goong – Kham
  - Ong Bak 2 – Tien
  - Ong Bak 3 – Tien
  - Tom Yum Goong 2 – Kham
  - Furious 7 – Kiet
  - SPL II: A Time for Consequences – Chatchai
  - xXx: Return of Xander Cage – Talon
  - Triple Threat – Payu
  - Detective Chinatown 3 – Jack Jaa
- Hayden Christensen
  - Life as a House – Sam Monroe
  - Star Wars: Episode II – Attack of the Clones – Anakin Skywalker
  - Star Wars: Episode III – Revenge of the Sith – Anakin Skywalker
  - Jumper – David Rice
  - Takers – A.J.
  - Vanishing on 7th Street – Luke Ryder
  - Outcast – Jacob
  - First Kill – William Beeman
  - Little Italy – Leonard "Leo" Campo
  - Star Wars: The Rise of Skywalker – Anakin Skywalker
  - Obi-Wan Kenobi – Anakin Skywalker
- John Cho
  - Star Trek – Hikaru Sulu
  - Star Trek Into Darkness – Hikaru Sulu
  - Star Trek Beyond – Hikaru Sulu
  - The Exorcist – Andrew "Andy" Kim
  - Searching – David Kim
  - The Grudge – Peter Spencer
  - Ghosted – The Leopard
  - Afraid – Curtis
- Justin Timberlake
  - Black Snake Moan – Ronnie Morgan
  - The Social Network – Sean Parker
  - Bad Teacher – Scott Delacorte
  - Friends with Benefits – Dylan Harper
  - In Time – William "Will" Salas
  - Runner Runner – Richie Furst
  - Palmer – Eddie Palmer
- Leonardo DiCaprio
  - Romeo + Juliet (2000 TV Asahi edition) – Romeo Montague
  - Don's Plum – Derek
  - The Aviator – Howard Hughes
  - Blood Diamond – Danny Archer
  - Revolutionary Road – Frank Wheeler
  - Inception (2012 TV Asahi edition) – Dom Cobb
  - One Battle After Another – "Ghetto" Pat Calhoun / Bob Ferguson
- Nicholas Tse
  - New Police Story – Frank Cheng Siu-fung
  - Rob-B-Hood – Nicholas
  - Beast Stalker – Sergeant Tong Fei
  - Bodyguards and Assassins – Deng Sidi
  - The Stool Pigeon – Ghost Jr.
  - From Vegas to Macau – Cool
- Chad Michael Murray
  - Freaky Friday – Jake
  - A Cinderella Story – Austin
  - Survive the Game – Eric
  - Fortress – Frederick Balzary
  - Freakier Friday – Jake Austin
- Aaron Stanford
  - X2 – Pyro
  - X-Men: The Last Stand – Pyro
  - Deadpool & Wolverine – Pyro
- Jorge Lendeborg Jr.
  - Spider-Man: Homecoming – Jason Ionello
  - Spider-Man: Far From Home – Jason Ionello

=== Live-action films ===
- 50/50 – Adam Lerner (Joseph Gordon-Levitt)
- Alexander – Alexander the Great (Colin Farrell)
- American History X – Danny (Edward Furlong)
- Avengers: Doomsday – Namor (Tenoch Huerta)
- Bad Boys (1999 Fuji TV edition) – Joe "Jo-Jo" (Michael Imperioli)
- Black Panther: Wakanda Forever – Namor (Tenoch Huerta)
- Bootmen – Sean Okden (Adam Garcia)
- The Bronze – Lance Tucker (Sebastian Stan)
- Bring It On – Cliff Pantone (Jesse Bradford)
- Camp Rock – Shane Gray (Joe Jonas)
- Cats & Dogs: The Revenge of Kitty Galore – Diggs (James Marsden)
- Coach Carter – Damien (Robert Ri'chard)
- Chaos – Shane Dekker (Ryan Phillippe)
- Chitty Chitty Bang Bang (1989 VHS edition) – Jeremy Potts (Adrian Hall)
- Cirque du Freak: The Vampire's Assistant – Steve Leonard (Josh Hutcherson)
- The Cloud – Elmar (Franz Dinda)
- Chronicle – Andrew Detmer (Dane DeHaan)
- Clash of the Titans (2012 TV Asahi edition) – Perseus (Sam Worthington)
- Crash – Officer Hanson (Ryan Phillippe)
- Criminal Activities – Zach (Michael Pitt)
- Dark Blue World – Karel Vojtisek (Kryštof Hádek)
- The Dark Crystal (Blu-Ray edition) – Jen (Stephen Garlick)
- Dawn of the Dead – Terry (Kevin Zegers)
- The Day After Tomorrow – Sam Hall (Jake Gyllenhaal)
- Day of the Dead (2020 Blu-ray edition) – Pvt. Miguel Salazar (Antoné Dileo Jr.)
- Defiance – Asael Bielski (Jamie Bell)
- Dr. Dolittle 2 – Eric (Lil Zane)
- Dragon Blade – Yin Po (Choi Si-won)
- dot the i – Kit Winter (Gael García Bernal)
- Dude, Where's My Car? – Jesse (Ashton Kutcher)
- Escape Room – Ben Miller (Logan Miller)
- Escape Room: Tournament of Champions – Ben Miller (Logan Miller)
- E.T. the Extra-Terrestrial (1988 VHS edition) – Elliot (Henry Thomas)
- The Expendables 3 – John Smilee (Kellan Lutz)
- The Fast and the Furious: Tokyo Drift (2025 The Cinema edition) – Sean Boswell (Lucas Black)
- F9 – Sean Boswell (Lucas Black)
- Father's Day – Scott Andrews (Charlie Hofheimer)
- Final Cut – Raphaël (Finnegan Oldfield)
- The Forbidden Kingdom – Jason Tripitikas (Michael Angarano)
- Freaks Out – Franz (Franz Rogowski)
- The Goonies – Mikey (Sean Astin)
- Gran Turismo – Matty Davis (Darren Barnet)
- Guns & Talks – Hayon (Won Bin)
- Hannibal Rising – Hannibal Lecter (Gaspard Ulliel)
- Hart's War – Lieutenant Lamar T. Archer (Vicellous Reon Shannon)
- He's Just Not That Into You – Alex (Justin Long)
- Hot Rod – Kevin Powell (Jorma Taccone)
- The Hurricane – Lesra Martin (Vicellous Reon Shannon)
- I Am Not a Serial Killer – John Wayne Cleaver (Max Records)
- IF – Bea's dad (John Krasinski)
- Igby Goes Down – Jason "Igby" Slocumb Jr. (Kieran Culkin)
- I.T. – Ed Porter (James Frecheville)
- Jason Bourne (2022 BS Tokyo edition) – Aaron Kalloor (Riz Ahmed)
- Jennifer's Body – Nikolai Wolf (Adam Brody)
- Knights of the Zodiac – Nero the Phoenix Knight (Diego Tinoco)
- The Last Emperor (1989 TV Asahi edition) – Puyi (8 years old) (Tijger Tsou)
- Leatherface – Jedidiah Sawyer / Jackson (Sam Strike)
- Letters to Juliet – Victor (Gael García Bernal)
- The Lookout – Chris Pratt (Joseph Gordon-Levitt)
- Love & Other Drugs – Jamie Randall (Jake Gyllenhaal)
- Mac and Me – Eric (Jade Calegory)
- The Magnificent Seven – Chico (Horst Bucholz)
- Man of Tai Chi – Tiger Chen Linhu (Tiger Chen)
- The Maze Runner – Gally (Will Poulter)
- Midnight Sun – Charles Reed (Patrick Schwarzenegger)
- The Mighty Ducks – Charlie Conway (Joshua Jackson)
- Mr. & Mrs. Smith – Benjamin "The Tank" Danz (Adam Brody)
- The NeverEnding Story – Bastian Balthazar Bux (Barret Oliver)
- Nicky Larson et le parfum de Cupidon – Poncho (Tarek Boudali)
- No Time to Die – Logan Ash (Billy Magnussen)
- North Face (2020 BS Tokyo edition) – Andreas Hinterstoisser (Florian Lukas)
- Ordinary People (2010 DVD edition) – Conrad Jarrett (Timothy Hutton)
- Our Times – Ouyang Fei-fan (Dino Lee)
- Pacific Rim – Chuck Hansen (Robert Kazinsky)
- Pandorum – Younger Corporal Gallo (Cam Gigandet)
- Pecker – Pecker (Edward Furlong)
- The Poseidon Adventure – Acres (Roddy McDowall)
- Priest – Hicks (Cam Gigandet)
- Prisoners (2016 BS Japan edition) – Alex Jones (Paul Dano)
- Resident Evil: Extinction (2010 TV Asahi edition) – Mikey (Christopher Egan)
- Resident Evil: The Final Chapter – Doc (Eoin Macken)
- The Return – Andrei (Vladimir Garin)
- Ride with the Devil – Jake (Tobey Maguire)
- Road Trip – Josh Parker (Breckin Meyer)
- Rogue – Neil Kelly (Sam Worthington)
- Roman Holiday (2022 NTV edition) – Joe Bradley (Gregory Peck)
- Salvador – Salvador Puig Antich (Daniel Brühl)
- Sanctum – Joshua "Josh" McGuire (Rhys Wakefield)
- The Science of Sleep – Stéphane (Gael García Bernal)
- The Scorpion King 2: Rise of a Warrior – Mathayus (Michael Copon)
- The Shining – Danny Torrance (Danny Lloyd)
- Silent Hill: Revelation – Vincent Cooper (Kit Harington)
- Silent Night – Simon (Matthew Goode)
- Sin City – Kevin; Cardinal Patrick Henry Roark; Yellow Bastard (Nick Stahl)
- Sky High – Will (Michael Angarano)
- Snow Queen – Kai (Jeremy Guilbaut)
- Snow White – Sleepy (Andy Grotelueschen)
- Snow White and the Huntsman – William (Sam Claflin)
- The Huntsman: Winter's War – King William (Sam Claflin)
- Spider-Man: Homecoming – Jackson Brice/Shocker (Logan Marshall-Green)
- Spy Kids 2: The Island of Lost Dreams – Gary Giggles (Matt O'Leary)
- Spy Kids 3-D: Game Over – Gary Giggles (Matt O'Leary)
- Stormbreaker – Alex Rider (Alex Pettyfer)
- Superfly – Youngblood Priest (Trevor Jackson)
- Taking Lives – Young Martin Asher (Paul Dano)
- Temptation of Wolves – Jung Tae-sung (Gang Dong-won)
- Terminator 2: Judgment Day – John Connor (Edward Furlong)
- Terminator 3: Rise of the Machines (2005 NTV edition) – John Connor (Nick Stahl)
- Time Bandits (1988 TV Asahi edition) – Kevin (Craig Warnock)
- Time Bandits (35th Anniversary edition) – Kevin's father (David Daker)
- Tom & Jerry – Cameron (Jordan Bolger)
- Transamerica – Toby Wilkins (Kevin Zegers)
- Twisters – Javi (Anthony Ramos)
- The United States of Leland – Leland P. Fitzgerald (Ryan Gosling)
- When the Game Stands Tall – Terrance G. "T.K." Kelly (Stephan James)
- White Oleander – Paul Trout (Patrick Fugit)
- Witness (1987 Fuji TV edition) – Samuel (Lukas Haas)
- World War Z – Andrew Fassbach (Elyes Gabel)
- Wrong Turn – Evan (Kevin Zegers)

=== Live action television ===
- And Then There Were None – Philip Lombard (Aidan Turner)
- The Brady Bunch – Cousin Oliver (Robbie Rist)
- The Blacklist: Redemption – Matias Solomon (Edi Gathegi)
- Charmed – Chris Halliwell (Drew Fuller)
- Counterpart – Claude Lambert (Guy Burnet)
- Debris – Eric King (David Alpay)
- D.P. – Private Ahn Joon-ho (Jung Hae-in)
- Genius – Young Albert Einstein (Johnny Flynn)
- Goosebumps (Let's Get Invisible!) – Max
- Gossip Girl – Dan Humphrey (Penn Badgley)
- Hannibal – Will Graham (Hugh Dancy)
- His Dark Materials – Lee Scoresby (Lin-Manuel Miranda)
- It – Henry Bowers (Jarred Blancard)
- It Started With a Kiss – Jiang Zhi Shu (Joe Cheng)
- Kindaichi Case Files Neo SP 1 – Byron Lee (Chun Wu)
- Limitless – Brian Finch (Jake McDorman)
- The Lost Symbol – Mal'akh (Beau Knapp)
- Merlin – Merlin (Colin Morgan)
- Playful Kiss – Baek Seung-jo (Kim Hyun-joong)
- Roots – Chicken George (Regé-Jean Page)
- Roswell – Michael Guerin (Brendan Fehr)
- They Kiss Again – Jiang Zhi Shu (Joe Cheng)
- Thunderbirds Are Go – Scott Tracy
- Torchwood – Owen Harper (Burn Gorman)
- Wednesday – Chet LaTroy (Haley Joel Osment)
- What I Like About You – Henry Gibson (Michael McMillian)

=== Animation ===
- The Adventures of Tintin – Tintin
- An American Tail – Fievel Mousekewitz
- An American Tail: Fievel Goes West – Fievel Mousekewitz
- Arthur Christmas – Peter
- Coraline – Wybie
- DC Super Heroes vs. Eagle Talon – Flash
- Dorothy and the Wizard of Oz – Scarecrow
- Helluva Boss – Chaz
- Legend of the Guardians: The Owls of Ga'Hoole – Kludd
- Luca – Ercole Visconti
- My Life as a Courgette – Simon
- My Little Pony: The Movie – Capper
- Star Wars: The Clone Wars (film) – Anakin Skywalker
- Star Wars: The Clone Wars (2008 TV series) – Anakin Skywalker
- Star Wars Rebels – Anakin Skywalker
- Trolls World Tour – Chaz
