= Reine des Fleurs =

2015 video game

レンドフルール (Rendo Furūru)
- Genre: Otome, Romance, Fantasy
- Video game

Reine des Fleurs
- Developer: Idea Factory
- Publisher: JP: Otomate
- Designed by: Usuba Kagero
- Genre: Visual novel
- Platform: PlayStation Vita, Nintendo Switch
- Released: JP: August 20, 2015; (PS Vita): JP: April 25, 2019; (Nintendo Switch)

Reine des Fleurs (レンドフルール, Rendo Furūru; lit. 'Queen of Flowers' in French) is a Japanese otome game developed by Idea Factory and published under their Otomate brand.

== Characters ==
=== Main Characters ===
Violette (ヴィオレット, Vioretto)
The protagonist of this story. She lives in Partedam and is the vessel for the goddess. She has a calm personality and is very beautiful, but because she was sheltered, she is naive about the world. Her symbol is the cherry blossom.
Leon (レオン, Reon)
Voice - Kazuyuki Okitsu
Birthplace: Pivoine
The Northern Knight. Although he is of noble birth, he spent his days living a dissolute life. He has a history of forcibly taking the qualifications from the original candidate for the flower crest to become the Northern Knight.
Louis (ルイ, Rui)
Voice - Daisuke Namikawa
Birthplace: Campanule
The Southern Knight. He has an appearance that captivates everyone and is a prince of Campanule, but he is the child of a concubine and has a decadent side. He received the blessing of the goddess of desire, Désirée.
Ghislain (ギスラン, Gisuran)
Voice - Takashi Kondo
Birthplace: Chrysantheme
A warrior who is the Eastern Knight. He achieved numerous military exploits as a soldier in his home country and is known by the nickname "The Angry Blade of Chrysantheme." He is strict with everyone, but swears loyalty to a master he has acknowledged.
Orphee (オルフェ, Orufe)
Voice - KENN
Birthplace: Œillet
The Western Knight. Born as an orphan, he traveled around various places as a bard in his home country. He has a bright and cheerful personality, but he is a bit mischievous.
Hubert (ユベール, Yubēru)
Voice - Tomokazu Sugita
The Prime Minister of Partedam and Violette's tutor. Known as the "living encyclopedia of Partedam," he is highly intelligent but is soft on Violette.

=== Secondary Characters ===
==== The Butterflies ====
Akane (茜, Akane)
Voice - Ayumi Fujimura
One of the twin butterflies who cares for Violette. She seems cheerful, but she is good at fake crying and uses extreme language when she speaks.
Ruri (瑠璃, Ruri)
Voice - Ayumi Fujimura
One of the twin butterflies who cares for Violette. She is more sensible than Akane, but she is skilled at covering things up.
Ageha (揚羽, Ageha)
Voice - Yuko Kaida
A beautiful woman in traditional Japanese clothing who is the guardian of the Scarlet Peony crest. She is Leon's butterfly (attendant), but the master-servant relationship is reversed, and she bosses Leon around.
Uranami (裏波, Uranami)
Voice - Kazuya Murakami
A young man who is the guardian of the Bellflower crest. He appears to be good friends with Louis, but they are wary of each other.
Tsumabeni (褄紅, Tsumabeni)
Voice - Kiyoshi Katsunuma
A man who is the guardian of the Chrysanthemum crest and has an injured left eye.
Asagi (浅葱, Asagi)
Voice - Michiko Kaiden
The guardian of the Pink Carnation crest. He is stubborn and gets grumpy if treated like a woman.

==== Others ====
Bon Bonheur (ボン・ボヌール, Bon Bonūru)
Voice - Tomohiro Sato
A "Flower Person" living in Partedam who is a culinary researcher pursuing gourmet food.
Madame Enju (マダム・エンジュ, Madamu Enju)
Voice - Saya Shinomiya
A "Flower Person" living in Partedam who is admired by all the other Flower People.
Goddess Miléne (女神ミレーヌ, Megami Mirēnu)
Voice - Yukana
The goddess who once saved the world. After creating Partedam, she has been sleeping for a long time.

== Game ==
The game was originally announced on March 20, 2014, via B's Log's May 2014 issue. On March 25, a promotional video for the game was released. On June 12, 2015, Otomate officially created their blog for the game. The game was released for the PlayStation Vita on August 20, 2015. The game's illustrations were done by Usuba Kagero.

In May 2018, Otomate announced that Reine des Fleurs would be released for the Nintendo Switch. The game was released on April 25, 2019.

== Music ==
The music off the game was performed by the band love solfage. The opening theme is Madoromi no Tsubomi (まどろみの蕾; lit. 'Bud of Slumber'), the ending theme is moi-meme, while the insert theme is l'entract.

== Bibliography ==
- Reine des Fleurs Official Visual Fan Book (レンドフルール 公式ビジュアルファンブック, Rendo Furūru Kōshiki Bijuaru Fan Bukku), released on October 31, 2015, ISBN 978-4047330801
- Reine des Fleurs Official World Guide Book (レンドフルール 公式ワールドガイドブック, Rendo Furūru Kōshiki Wārudo Gaido Bukku), released on November 30, 2015, ISBN 978-4047330894
- Reine des Fleurs Anthology (レンドフルール アンソロジー, Rendo Furūru Ansorojī), released on November 30, 2015, ISBN 978-4047308107
- Reine des Fleurs Memorial Book (レンドフルール メモリアルブック, Rendo Furūru Memoriaru Bukku), released on June 30, 2016, ISBN 978-4891993917

== Reception ==
In Issue 1392 of Famitsu review scores, Reine des Fleurs was given a score of 34 out of 40.

Reine des Fleurs ranked in 6th place with 11,191 sales on the Famitsu sales list released on August 26, 2015.
