= Bad Apple Wars =

2015 video game

- North American cover art. Despite being a PlayStation Vita exclusive, the North American release does not include the "only on PlayStation" branding.
- Developer: Otomate
- Publishers: JP: Idea Factory; NA/EU: Aksys Games
- Platform: PlayStation Vita
- Release: JP: November 19, 2015; NA/EU: October 17, 2017
- Genre: Visual novel
- Mode: Single-player

Bad Apple Wars (Note: Japanese: バッドアップルウォーズ, Hepburn: Baddoappuruu~ōzu) is an otome visual novel video game developed by Otomate, exclusively released for the PlayStation Vita by Idea Factory in 2015 in Japan and by Aksys Games in 2017 in North America and Europe. The game follows a student named Rinka who, after dying in an accident, wakes up in an afterlife modelled around a high school setting. It launched to favourable reviews by Western critics, who generally praised the story.

== Gameplay ==
As a visual novel, players read text to enjoy the story, occasionally making decisions on how to progress which ultimately effect the plot's outcome. The game has a unique 'soul touch' feature where during select romance scenes, the player can tap their Vita screen to advance the story, with certain tap selections influencing later outcomes. The game is also compatible with the PlayStation TV microconsole.

== Synopsis ==
The game follows Rinka, who, on her way to her first day of high school, is struck and killed at a crosswalk by a passing car while stopping to grab her shoe that falls off her foot. After death, she is greeted by Mr. Rabbit (a teacher with a rabbit mask) in the afterlife in front of NEVAEH Academy, a purgatory-esque setting for deceased students with strict rules including masked headgear for all faculty and students. A teacher at the school, Mr. Rabbit brings her to the academy's opening ceremony, which is attacked by the 'Bad Apples,' a group of students who oppose the strict authoritative nature that the schools runs on.

Players are given the choice to side with bad apples or good apples (those who abide by the rules of the school administration, including the student prefects which enforce them), with each pathway involving unique branching paths and multiple endings which are dependent on choices made by the player during their playthrough.

== Development and release ==
The game was announced on April 17, 2015, for a release later that year as a PlayStation Vita exclusive by Otomate, the visual novel branch of Idea Factory. The title ultimately released in Japan on November 19, 2015. A patch for the Japanese release was released on November 24, correcting a typographical error that was present in the game.

Aksys Games announced a localization of the game at Anime Expo 2017 on July 1, 2017, alongside several other visual novel titles, originally set for a September 29, 2017 release both digitally and physically. On September 1, Aksys announced the title would be delayed by two weeks, with a new launch date of October 13 for international audiences. A day one 'launch edition' was available in North America exclusively at GameStop, which included a complimentary 48-page artbook inside of a unique cardboard collector's box.

== Reception ==
Reception

Aggregate score
Aggregator	Score
Metacritic	78/100

Review score
Publication	Score
Famitsu	7/10, 7/10, 7/10, 7/10

Bad Apple Wars received "generally favorable" reviews according to review aggregator Metacritic, with a 78/100 based on seven critic scores. Upon release in Japan, Famitsu's four reviews each gave the game a 7/10 score, commenting that the game's world was good.
