= Diario: Rebirth Moon Legend =

2007 video game

Diario: Rebirth Moon Legend squad
- Cover art
- Developer(s): Idea Factory
- Publisher(s): Idea Factory
- Platform(s): Xbox 360
- Release: JP: February 8, 2007
- Genre(s): Role-playing video game
- Mode(s): Single player

Diario: Rebirth Moon Legend is an enhanced port of Idea Factory's tactical RPG Rebirth Moon, which appeared originally on the PS2.

GameSpot gave it a 7.3/10.
