= Amnesia (2011 video game) =

Japanese visual novel series

- Video game
- Developer: Idea Factory
- Publisher: Idea Factory
- Genre: Visual novel
- Platform: PlayStation Portable
- Released: JP: August 11, 2011
Further information
Video game
Amnesia Later
Developer	Idea Factory
Publisher	Idea Factory
Platform	PlayStation Portable
Released	JP: March 15, 2012
Video game
Amnesia Crowd
Developer	Idea Factory
Publisher	Idea Factory
Platform	PlayStation Portable
Released	JP: April 18, 2013
Anime television series
Directed by	Yoshimitsu Ohashi
Produced by	Keitarō Sunohara; Yōhei Hayashi; Fuminori Yamazaki; Gorō Shinjuku; Asuka Yamazaki; Takashi Iwasaki
Written by	Touko Machida
Music by	Yoshiaki Dewa
Studio	Brain's Base
Licensed by	AUS: Hanabee; NA: Sentai Filmworks
Original network	AT-X, BS11 Digital, KBS Kyoto, SUN TV, Tokyo MX TV, TV Aichi, TV Kanagawa
English network	NA: Anime Network
Original run	January 7, 2013 – March 25, 2013
Episodes	12
Original video animation
Directed by	Masayuki Matsumoto
Studio	Brain's Base
Released	September 25, 2013
Runtime	25 minutes
Video game
Amnesia: Memories
Developer	Idea Factory
Publisher	Idea Factory International
Platform	PlayStation Vita, Microsoft Windows, Android, iOS, Nintendo Switch
Released	December 19, 2013: PlayStation Vita, Microsoft Windows, Android, iOS; December 19, 2013 (JP) August 25, 2015 (NA) August 26, 2015 (EU); Nintendo Switch; September 20, 2022
Video game
Amnesia World
Developer	Idea Factory
Publisher	Idea Factory
Platform	PlayStation Vita
Released	JP: May 22, 2014
Video game
Amnesia Later x Crowd V Edition
Developer	Idea Factory
Publisher	Idea Factory
Platform	PlayStation Vita
Released	JP: October 16, 2014
Manga
AMNESIA LATER NEW WORLD
Written by	Otomate
Illustrated by	Kyo Kitazawa
Published by	Bunkasha
Published	October 10, 2017
Volumes	1
Video game
Amnesia: Later×Crowd
Developer	Idea Factory
Publisher	Idea Factory
Platform	Nintendo Switch
Released	WW: September 20, 2022

Amnesia (stylized as AMNEƧIA, released as Amnesia: Memories in English) is a Japanese visual novel series by Idea Factory. It was first released in August 2011, for PlayStation Portable, and then a fan disc in Japan, Amnesia Later, was released in March 2012. Another sequel titled Amnesia Crowd was released in April 2013. They were later combined for a PlayStation Vita release titled "Amnesia Later x Crowd V Edition" in October 2014. A Nintendo Switch port of Amnesia: Memories and Amnesia: Later×Crowd was globally released on September 20, 2022. Due to its positive reception in Japan, it produced various related merchandise such as drama CDs, character music CDs and books. A 2013 anime television series has been produced by Brain's Base.

== Gameplay ==
Amnesia is an otome game; the player takes the role of a female character who can choose from a variety of male characters for her love interest.

In Amnesia, the male characters that the female character can interact with are based on the symbolic suit symbols from a card deck with the following storylines, commonly known as routes: Heart, Spade, Clover, Diamond and Joker. The player's relationship with each character differs depending on which route is chosen. Each route is a parallel world where the heroine seeks to understand more about her selected male character.

The premise to the game is that a sprite called Orion accidentally attaches himself to the Heroine, causing her to lose all her memories. In order for Orion to free himself and return to his own world, the Heroine must regain these memories through interactions with important people and places in her life. Orion acts as her guide, giving her advice and perspective, and providing her with an "inner voice." Orion also serves as the main narrator to the story especially in the later story sequels.

Like many otome games, the events take place over a fixed time frame and different decision-trees result in accumulation of artwork, stories, and endings with the various characters in the game. However, unlike many games, each route is a parallel world: events that take place in one route may not have happened in another route; the pre-existing relationships the heroine had before amnesia are different in each route; and the relationship-tracking meters may be different from one world to the next.

== Characters ==
=== Main characters ===
Heroine (主人公, Shujinkō)
Voiced by: Kaori Nazuka (Japanese); Maggie Flecknoe (English)
The heroine of the story who has lost her memories. In the game, Orion follows and supports her throughout each route to regain her memories. She also works part-time at a maid cafe called Meido no Hitsuji.
Shin (シン)
Voiced by: Tetsuya Kakihara (Japanese); Houston Hayes (English)
Shin is a 17-year-old high school student studying hard to get into university. Shin's father accidentally killed a man while under the influence of alcohol, and he was avoided by classmates and close friends during his childhood as a result. Only his childhood friends, the heroine and Toma, treated him normally. Shin and Toma can become super competitive with each other, but they have managed to stay friends despite this. Shin is trying to make a successful future for himself to stop people from comparing him with his father. He is the heroine's boyfriend in his route, but has a tendency of being rude and calling her an idiot. He enjoys playing card games and is a member of the track-and-field club. His favorite animals are dogs, and his love for melon soda is evident in the anime, game and several drama CDs. His symbolic route in the game is the 'Heart' route.
Ikki (イッキ)
Voiced by: Kishou Taniyama (Japanese); Blake Shepard (English)
Ikki is 22 years old and a fourth year university student. He is best friends with Kent and has a 19-year-old younger sister (in the game). Ikki's hobbies include playing darts, billiards, and table tennis, as well as solving Kent's math puzzles. He is notably skilled at 'anything requiring him to use his hands'. His favorite animals are apparently hamsters. When he was a kid he wished on a shooting star for girls to like him and was granted with eyes that make him irresistible to any woman. However as time passed, he began to think of it as a curse. These eyes, however, do not affect the heroine, which is why he falls in love with her on his route. Ikki is always surrounded by girls and has a fan club that would do literally anything for him to be theirs – they bully the heroine often due to her being close to him. He dates women for three months before they break up with him due to his fan club having the rule of sharing him and only allowing club members to date him for three months, though he is unaware of this. His symbolic route in the game is the 'Spade' route.
Kent (ケント, Kento)
Voiced by: Akira Ishida (Japanese); Tyler Galindo (English)
Kent is a 25-year-old university graduate and Ikki's best friend. His interests include devising math puzzles for Ikki and observing things. His parents raised him with the belief that everything has some sort of logical conclusion, thus he believes anything can be solved using logic. He often uses this logic to advise Ikki, who then uses his dexterity and leadership skills to act on Kent's advice. Kent came to know the heroine through being her tutor. On his route, he has a hard time showing his feelings for the heroine. His symbolic route in the game is the 'Club' route.
Toma (トーマ)
Voiced by: Satoshi Hino (Japanese); Christopher Ayres (English)
Toma is a 19-year-old at his second year at university. He is a childhood friend of both Heroine and Shin, and acts as an older brother figure to both. He loves the heroine but has a Yandere personality in a few routes. In addition to being in a number of school clubs, including soccer, broadcasting, archery, and the newspaper, Toma enjoys playing basketball, cycling, surfing the internet, playing video games, cooking and reading. His symbolic route in the game is the 'Diamond' route. Toma is revealed to love the heroine in two of the worlds (Shin's and his routes).
Ukyō (ウキョウ)
Voiced by: Kōki Miyata (Japanese); Patrick Poole (English)
Ukyō is a 24-year-old photographer with a split personality who seems to know the heroine, but remains distant. He is in a lot of different clubs: triathlon, cheerleading, hula dance, soccer, lacrosse, rugby, kabaddi, dance, art, riding, debate and more. His symbolic route in the game is the 'Joker' route. It is revealed in this route that he made a wish to Orion's superior Nhil, asking for the heroine to live, and thus he has to die on every route where she survives, as they can't live together on the same world.

=== Others ===
Orion (オリオン)
Voiced by: Hiromi Igarashi (Japanese); Shannon Emerick (English)
A fairy who came from a completely different world. From a human's point-of-view, he appears as a twelve-year-old young boy wearing eccentric clothing. He instigates events of the story by dislodging all of the Heroine's memories. No one can see or hear him but he can only travel a 10m radius while attached to her.
Sawa (サワ)
Voiced by: Satomi Moriya (Japanese); Allison Sumrall (English)
A female university student with a bright and sporty personality. She is the heroine's best friend and is hinted to have a crush on Shin. She speaks in a very lively way, but is someone one you can rely on. In Ikki's route, she does not work at the cafe, but she is still good friends with the heroine.
Mine (ミネ)
Voiced by: Kana Akutsu (Japanese); Molly Searcy (English)
The heroine's kōhai at the place where she works part-time. She has a crush on Ikki in most of the routes, but she likes Waka in Kent's route.
Rika (リカ)
Voiced by: Yoshida Seiko (Japanese); Genevieve Simmons (English)
A mysterious woman who dresses in "sophisticated" clothes. She is the head of the Ikki fan club. Rika is well mannered, but is terribly cold towards the heroine in most of the routes.
Waka (ワカ)
Voiced by: Takahashi Hidenori (Japanese); Jay Hickman (English)
The manager at the place where the heroine works part-time. He is a wise businessman who holds a firm policy. It appears that he has a habit of being too devoted to the ideologies he believes in, and outwardly, he has a little bit of a blown-away behaviour. In the game, Waka has a different personality depending on the player's route.
Luka (ルカ, Ruka)
Voiced by: Yoshimasa Hosoya
Luka is a mysterious individual and plays an important role in Amnesia Crowd. Later it is revealed that he is older brother of Rika.

== Media ==
=== Anime ===
During Otome Party 2012, production of an anime television adaptation was announced with an expected broadcast in 2013. The opening theme is "Zoetrope" by Nagi Yanagi and the ending theme is "Recall" by Ray. The series aired from January 7, 2013, to March 25, 2013, and was animated by Brain's Base.

No.	Title	Original release date
1	"I"	January 7, 2013
The story begins with the heroine trying to escape a burning building, followed by a vision of her drowning. Afterward, she awakens in the back room of a cafe, with no memories, as people who seem to know her argue about how to help her. A strangely dressed boy named Orion appears, floating in midair, and explains that he is a spirit whom only the heroine can see or hear. He informs her that she lost her memories from before August 1, three days ago, due to his carelessness, and he will try to help her recover them. He advises her to keep her amnesia a secret. The heroine starts regaining small pieces of her memories. She finds a picture of her with her face scribbled out in her mailbox. As she walks home, a group of girls confront the heroine saying that she broke their "promise". The heroine remembers the girls attacking her, and faints.
2	"II"	January 14, 2013
The heroine returns to the cafe she collapsed in, after realizing that she works there, and regains another memory. She remembers Shin, her childhood friend, sitting next to her and telling her that he killed someone. As the heroine and Orion head home, she is almost run over by a truck, but a mysterious young man with long green hair, named Ukyo, saves her. He asks if she remembers him before leaving. The next day, the Heroine goes on a trip with her coworkers into the forest. She remembers going with her coworker Kent to a festival, but Kent doesn't remember the event. At night, walking outside with Shin, she becomes frightened of him and starts running away from him, and accidentally falls off a cliff. Ukyo appears and lets her fall, saying to himself that "There's nothing [he] can do. It's her destiny, after all." Suddenly, she wakes up bandaged in the hospital and realizes that time has reverted to August 1. Orion has disappeared. Shin enters her hospital room, and to her surprise, kisses her.
3	"III"	January 21, 2013
Shin takes the Heroine home from the hospital, and quickly figures out that she has lost her memories. He tells her that he is her boyfriend. When the heroine goes to work the next day, she notices that her manager, Waka, seems to have a very different personality than before. The Heroine's co-workers remember her accident differently from her. Shin takes the heroine to the college she attends. Shin tells her more about who he is and about their relationship. In the band room, he attempts to kiss her and bring back some memories, but she evades him and he gives up. On the way home, Ukyo meets her, speaks to her enigmatically, and disappears just before Shin arrives.
4	"IV"	January 28, 2013
After briefly hearing Orion's voice, the heroine talks with Shin about their relationship. The next day, her coworkers invite her out. Shin arrives to talk to the Heroine alone in the forest, and pins her to a tree as he explains the accident. The events he describes are similar to how she remembers, but not identical. The heroine panics and tries to run away. This time, Shin stops her from falling, and apologizes for trying to rush their relationship. The two return and sit down on the steps. The heroine remembers Shin confessing to killing a man, but now he tells her that his father killed a man. Shin continues explaining his past, hoping to help her remember. Shin asks the Heroine again about dating him. She responds that she doesn't know him very well, which he accepts. Shin passionately kisses her, and she doesn't break away. The heroine wants to regain memories for her and Shin's sake. As they walk home, the heroine is about to be hit by a truck, and she faints. She awakens in her room and realizes that it is August 1 again. Her coworker Ikki meets her outside her apartment and flirts with her.
5	"V"	February 4, 2013
Ikki and the heroine go on a date to see a movie, and Ikki asks the heroine to think of a request for him to grant. After thinking, she tells him to escort her to work tomorrow. He tells her that it is odd, but he will grant it. At home, as the heroine starts to go to sleep, still confused, Orion reappears in her room. He reveals that the heroine's experiences were real, and that she might have somehow traveled to another world. Before he's able to explain any further, he vanishes mid-sentence. At work, her manager's personality is once again different, but Ikki helps the heroine through the day, sparking her memories of him. One of her coworkers advises the heroine that she shouldn't date Ikki because of a rumor that he always dumps girls after three months. The heroine sees Ikki and Kent arguing and acting as if they are about to physically fight each other. She jumps in between them, falls, and hits her head. When the three of them go to Ikki's house, she realizes that they were only talking about a way to beat each other at a mind puzzle game.
6	"VI"	February 11, 2013
Ikki escorts the Heroine home, where she gets a text message from an unknown person about a "daily report." On the street, she encounters Ukyo, who gives her confusing advice before departing. At work, she learns of a planned forest trip. The date matches when she fell from the cliff, but Ikki, his fan club, and her are going this time. The heroine goes on the trip. When they are alone, Ikki tells her that when he was younger, he wished that girls would fall in love with him, and it came true: any girl who looks into his eyes falls for him instantly. He has come to despise their superficial affection. He cares for the heroine because his supernatural charm does not work on her, and her affection is genuine. At a pier, the Heroine is confronted by Ikki's fan club, and learns that they choose to only date him for three months each to share him. They threaten her because she broke a promise to deliver her "daily report" about Ikki. They push her onto a small boat and into the lake. Orion appears, and talks with the heroine briefly. She capsizes the boat and drowns.
7	"VII"	February 18, 2013
The heroine awakens on August 1. She meets with Kent, who asks her why she had a problem with his attitude. Confused, she ends the conversation. Kent attempts to go on a date with the heroine and spend more time with her, but his attempts are so flat and unromantic that she does not recognize them as dates until he tells her. Later, the heroine waits for Kent so they can go to a festival together. Kent calls her, saying that he is late because it was uninteresting to him and he had forgotten. Soon, Kent arrives by running home early from his workplace in the rain. At the festival, she learns that the promise he made when they started dating was to simply go to the festival together. They both enjoyed the festival. Kent reveals that he has figured out that the heroine lost her memories. Orion appears, and Kent converses with Orion through the heroine. When Kent stops to think, Orion disappears. Kent expresses his affection towards the heroine, and she accepts. Kent holds the heroine's hand walking home. She lets go after someone bumps into her, and now Toma is holding her hand instead of Kent.
8	"VIII"	February 25, 2013
The heroine passes out, dropping her phone. Toma escorts the heroine to her home and gives her a new phone. She finds a locked diary of hers, and learns from her calendar that she had been planning to regularly meet Ikki in a certain back alley. The heroine finds trash inside her mailbox. Shortly afterward, Toma checks her mailbox by himself and is shocked to find nothing inside. Later, the heroine asks Toma to find a back alley, where the heroine discreetly asks if they are dating. He says that they are. They go to her workplace to request a leave of absence, and then to Toma's home. Later that night, the heroine leaves his house alone. Later, Ukyo reveals himself and grabs her hand, telling her that she will die soon. However, Toma comes in and shoves Ukyo away. Ukyo disappears, and Toma comforts the heroine, offering to let her stay at his home for the night. In bed, Toma grabs and holds her, muttering about how he could not sleep alone. They agree to go out and take a break for some time. They go shopping, and Ikki's fangirls confront the heroine and cut her hair.
9	"IX"	March 4, 2013
After the incident with Ikki's fangirls, Toma keeps the heroine isolated in his house for several days. Every time she woke up, he gave her food drugged with sleeping pills. Orion tells her what Toma has done, and the heroine tries to escape. She finds her original phone, which contained threatening texts from Ikki's fangirls. Before they can leave, Shin arrives and starts arguing with Toma. The heroine hides in bed, and overhears that Toma is not her boyfriend. After Shin leaves, Toma reveals his true motive for keeping her, and kisses her forcefully. The next morning, she wakes up in a cage stocked with plushies. At night, Toma lets her out of the cage and explains that he had lied to her about being her boyfriend and kept her to protect her from Ikki's fans. Toma suddenly needs to leave, and he puts her back in the cage but forgets to lock it. The heroine escapes, wanting to go home and read her locked diary so she can find out how she truly feels about Toma.
10	"X"	March 11, 2013
The heroine arrives home, picks the lock on her diary, and learns that she loved Toma, and that August 1 was the day she had planned to tell him. Ikki knew of this. Toma rushes in, angered. He talks about how it was dangerous to go outside and how she kept "running away" from him. He notices her injuries, and tells her that since she did not know how hurt he felt, he would stop caring about her pain. He holds and threatens her. She drops her diary, and Toma reads about her feelings toward him. He apologizes and tells her he loves her, and she forgives him. Toma takes her to the hospital for her injuries, where Ikki and his fan club apologize to her. Toma leaves her for the night. Ukyo arrives and throws the heroine off of the hospital roof. She appears in a burning building, and then in her home on August 1. She meets Ukyo, who acts friendly, and is confused as to why she is scared of him. Ukyo tells her about future disasters, and saves her again and tells her that the world is trying to kill her and that they are lovers.
11	"XI"	March 18, 2013
Ukyo talks about their past together and the well at the old shrine nearby, then suddenly crouches in fear mid-sentence. He says that he will protect the heroine until August 25. Later, Ukyo's split personalities waver over whether or not to continue protecting the heroine. She finds him and he grabs her, telling her that she should be dead, not him. Ukyo lets go and apologizes in a panic before saying that he is a danger to her. The heroine meets Ukyo at the shrine, and he tries to drop her into the well. Ukyo cuts himself to return to normal and stops the heroine from falling. Ukyo messages the heroine to help her avoid danger. Ukyo calls to tell her that August 25 is when she is in the most danger. He tells her to not leave the house and that she should never trust him again once he ends the call. The next day is a thunderstorm, and Ukyo messages her, saying that he will die at the university. She arrives and he threatens to kill her. The building catches fire from lightning. Ukyo traps her in the auditorium and sets it on fire.
12	"XII"	March 25, 2013
Ukyo changes to his good side, and explains that the heroine was caught in an explosion on August 1, and was unconscious until she died on August 25. Since he couldn't accept her death, he traveled to other worlds to find one where she was alive. Whenever they were in the same world, she was targeted by the world for fatal accidents. Ukyo memorized what happened to warn her next time. There was no world where both of them were supposed to live, which was why Ukyo's bad side was trying to kill her. Bad Ukyo says that Neil doesn't have any more power left to send him to another world, meaning that this was his last chance to kill her. Orion explains that Neil was the creator of all fairies and he gained power from granting wishes to humans. Bad Ukyo attacks her, but Ukyo kills himself so the heroine can live. In his final moments, he confesses his love to her. The clock strikes twelve, and Neil explains that he sent her to the other worlds to save her because of Ukyo's despair at losing her. Five cards appear before her, and she returns to her original world.

== Reception ==
Reception

Aggregate score
Aggregator	Score
Metacritic	(Memories) PC: 72/100 (Memories) VITA: 72/100

Review score
Publication	Score
TouchArcade	(Memories) iOS: 4/5

The anime adaptation of Amnesia was generally poorly received. Anime News Network's Rebecca Silverman gave the first half a C grade overall, commenting "Parts of it are fascinating...while other parts are intensely annoying", and said the show "basically feels like watching someone else play the game." Matthew Lee, writing for Twitch Film, opined that Amnesia's "story offers nothing of any interest beyond the burning question of what the hell any of it means." Seb Reid of UK Anime Network rated it 4 out of 10 and called it "A show that is best forgotten." Silverman gave the second half an overall grade of D, saying that "Ultimately Amnesia ends as it began – fascinating in the same way a loose tooth is, but the payout when you finally get rid of it doesn't feel like enough."
