= Mist of Chaos =

2007 video game

- Developer(s): Idea Factory
- Publisher(s): Idea Factory
- Platform(s): PlayStation 3
- Release: JP: March 22, 2007
- Genre(s): Tactical role-playing
- Mode(s): Single-player

Mist of Chaos (Note: Japanese: ミスト オブ カオス, Hepburn: Misuto obu Kaosu) is a strategy role-playing game developed by Idea Factory for the PlayStation 3 video game console. It was released by Idea Factory in Japan on March 22, 2007, and distributed by Hong Kong–based New Era Interactive Software in South East Asia on March 23. Cyberfront Korea published a Korean version on July 31, 2007.
