= Song Summoner: The Unsung Heroes =

2008 video game

- Game artwork
- Developer: Square Enix
- Publisher: Square Enix
- Producer: Takehito Ando
- Designers: Yusuke Naora; Roberto Ferrari
- Platforms: iPod, iOS
- Release: iPod: EU: July 7, 2008; NA: July 8, 2008; JP: July 8, 2008; iOS; December 2, 2009
- Genre: Role-playing
- Mode: Single-player

Song Summoner: The Unsung Heroes (Note: Japanese: ソングサマナー 歌われぬ戦士の旋律, Hepburn: Songu Samanā Utawarenu Senshi no Senritsu; lit. Song Summoner: The Unsung Warrior's Melody) is an iPod tactical role-playing game developed and published by Square Enix worldwide.

A new version entitled Song Summoner: The Unsung Heroes – Encore was announced for iOS at the 2009 Tokyo Game Show. This game expands on the original game with new Tune Troopers and a reworked storyline twice the size of the first. The game was released on the App Store on December 2, 2009. On May 13, 2016, Song Summoner was removed from the App Store, and can no longer be purchased. The app description had been previously updated explaining serious compatibility issues with iOS 8 and up.

== Gameplay ==
The game enables the player to generate unique characters called Tune Troopers by analyzing the player's iPod or iPhone music library. The game features a "listening point system" where listening to songs used in the creation of a game character causes the character to grow in strength.

There are 50 characters that can be generated, each of which falls into one of five job classes: Soldier, Mage, Archer, Knight, and Monk. Most of the Troopers and their skills are named or modeled after songs, albums and musicians from both Japanese and Western music. Each Trooper is given a rank of bronze, silver, gold or platinum as well as a secondary letter ranking based on its statistics in relation to its rank. The higher a Trooper's rank, the fewer times it can be deployed; however, further deployments, called rewinds, can be bought. Other items, called "pitch pearls", allow the Troopers' ranks to be increased. Pearls can be obtained by defeating monsters in quests and in the rehearsal room. The rehearsal room is a place where the Troopers can be trained one at a time to become stronger.

== Plot ==
The game begins as Ziggy, the main character, and Zero, his little brother, are running away from Full House, a Stargazer in the mechanical militia. Full House takes Zero away and is about to kill Ziggy when the Soul Master appears. He uses Ziggy's cube pendant to summon Her Majesty, a soldier-type Tune Trooper. The Soul Master and the Tune Trooper defeat the robots and drive Number 42 and Full House away. The Soul Master then explains to Ziggy that he is a conductor, and can summon and control an army through the music that is on the user's iPod. After 5 years of training, Ziggy starts his quest to find his little brother.

Ziggy starts his quest by heading to Oppenheimer, a city to the North. From there he rescues a robot deserter, which he names Z.E.R.O., due to the large number of zeros in its name. It is noted that the cube pendant resonates when they first meet. He then travels to Full House's tower, where he defeats Full House and rescues Golden Wing, a Superstar who joins Ziggy's party.

After that, Ziggy climbs the legendary Joshua Tree and sees the equally legendary Ship of Fools. After travelling to the Ship of Fools, he finds that the Mechanical Militiamen are created from humans through a conversion machine inside the Ship of Fools. Ziggy then goes to Stargazer Straight Flush's tower, destroying Straight Flush and rescuing an archer-type Superstar, Seattlite.

After that, Ziggy, Z.E.R.O., Golden Wing, and Seattlite head into Metropolis, meet Seattlite's daughter, Frances at the House of the Holy, and go into Stargazer Great Artist's tower. After he is defeated, the Stargazer hacks the network and makes sure that he cannot be rebuilt and that he will die human. Finding the tower devoid of any Superstars, they return to Metropolis and find a Soldier-classed Superstar named No Future, who had been hiding in Metropolis.

When reaching Paradise City and heading to the volcano Mt. Tarkus to search the captured civilians, Ziggy and his group later heads to the Machine Head Labs and successfully saved the civilians who initially wanted to become machines to end their starvation. At Stargazer Boxcar’s tower, Ziggy defeats Boxcar and rescues a Monk-classed Superstar named Ogre Battler.

After saving Ogre Battler, the group heads to Number 42’s tower and encounters Stargazer Nameless, whom Ziggy suspects him as Zero. It is revealed that Nameless is not Zero. He plays with Ziggy’s mind causing Ziggy to refuse to attack him and believe he is his little brother. Once Nameless is defeated, a Mage-Classed sole female Superstar named Pleione is rescued and joins the group and embarks to the Core System.

Ultimate Answer 42 after melding with the network

Once Ziggy reaches the core system, he finds that Z.E.R.O. is not a deserter and has been working for Number 42 all along. Z.E.R.O. leads the party to the final confrontation with Number 42, when he steals the cube pendant, allowing Number 42 to use its power to activate the Network, a collective consciousness which can take control of all living beings in the land of Melodica. Ziggy then proceeds to fight Z.E.R.O.. Ziggy disables Z.E.R.O., and when he is remade by Number 42, the Song of the Unsung is unlocked from Ziggy's pendant. The Song of the Unsung is a song made by conductors of old that disables robots when used. Once Number 42 realizes that he has been betrayed by Z.E.R.O., he unleashes all four Stargazers, and they attack Ziggy. After the battle, Number 42 has merged with the Network, transforming into Ultimate Answer 42 and granting him near invulnerability. Z.E.R.O. uses himself to channel the Song of the Unsung into the Network to make Ultimate Answer 42 vulnerable. While this is happening, Z.E.R.O.'s faceplate shatters and it is revealed that he is really Zero, Ziggy's lost brother. After Number 42 is killed, Zero sacrifices himself to destroy the Core of the Network for good by channeling his current into the Core. The resulting explosion leaves a crater, seeming to having destroyed Zero. As Ziggy reflects on the destruction and subsequent loss of his brother again, his pendant glows, and Zero's body appears, and springs to life, though without any of his memories.

After the credits, Ziggy realizes that Zero's memories are coming back because of the Song of the Unsung. Then the game ends, as they both walk into the distance, proceeding to sing the Song, hoping to bring Zero's memories back.

== Development ==
The iPhone edition of Song Summoner doubled the size of the story mode and featured over fifty unlockable Tune Troops.

== Reception ==
Ars Technica reviewed the iPod release, giving it a "buy" recommendation for game players who like tactical strategy games such as Final Fantasy Tactics. Eurogamer called out the click wheel controls and unique troop generating mechanism, but called the gameplay simplistic.

RPGFan did not recommend the iPhone version of the game, calling the story "childish", the graphics typical of other games on iOS, and controls reminiscent of its original release on Apple's iPod. Slide to Play praised the game's unique take on a strategy RPG, but mentioned the "hit or miss" touch controls and the lack of clarity around what kinds of music produced what kind of character units.

== Sequel ==
A game entitled Guns n' Souls featuring Song Summoner was announced by Square Enix in December 2013. Players control Ziggy once again, who now powers his magic sword with cards representing different characters, each possessing unique musical instruments.
