= Idea Factory =

Japanese video game developer and publisher

Idea Factory Holdings Co., Ltd.
- Native name: アイディアファクトリー株式会社
- Type: Kabushiki gaisha
- Industry: Video games
- Founded: October 26, 1994; 32 years ago
- Headquarters: Kyōbashi, Chūō, Tokyo, Japan
- Key people: Shingo Kuwana (Chairman); Yoshiteru Sato (President)
- Subsidiaries: Compile Heart; Otomate; Design Factory; Idea Factory International; Altergear
- Website: https://www.ideaf.co.jp/

Idea Factory Holdings Co., Ltd. (アイディアファクトリー株式会社, Aidia Fakutorī Kabushiki-gaisha) is a Japanese video game developer and publisher founded by former Data East employees in October 1994. The company is known for its role-playing games and visual novels, including titles released under its Otomate brand.

A division of the company produces otome games under the name of Otomate (see list below). An international publishing subsidiary, Idea Factory International, was opened in California in 2013 to localize and distribute titles outside Japan.

In 2022, the company announced Altergear, a division focused on visual novel titles aimed at a male audience.

== History ==
The company's international branch, Idea Factory International, was established on September 30, 2013, in California, United States, where it serves as the company’s primary overseas publishing arm.

== Games published ==
For other games published by Idea Factory, also see games developed by Compile Heart.

Year	Title	Systems	Ref.
1996	Spectral Tower	PS	
1996	Yaku ~Yuujou Dangi~	PS	
1997	Spectral Force	PS	
1997	Yaku Tsū ~Noroi no Game~	PS	
1998	Monster Complete World	PS	
1998	Spectral Force: Aira Kourin	Mobile phone	
1998	Spectral Force 2: Eien naru Kiseki	PS	
1998	Spectral Tower II	PS	
1999	Junjou de Karen Meimai Kishi-dan: Spectral Force Seishoujo Gaiden	PS	
1999	Oasis Road	PS	
1999	Spectral Blade	PS	
1999	Spectral Force: Itoshiki Ja'aku (Lovely Wickedness)	PS	
2000	Densetsu Kemono no Ana: Monster Complete World Ver.2	PS	
2000	Ikasama Mahjong	PS	
2000	Kingdom of Chaos: SPECTRAL FORCE THE UNIVERSE	PC	
2000	Ma-Mi-Mu-Me☆Mogacho no PRINT HOUR	PS2	
2000	Sky Surfer	PS2	
2000	Suna no Embrace: Eden no Sato no Navel	PS	
2001	Generation of Chaos	PS2	
2001	Mou Hitotsu no Spectral: GLOBAL FOLKTALE	PS2	
2001	RUN=DIM: As Black Soul	DC	
2001	The Mechsmith RUN=DIM	PS2	
2002	Field of Chaos	PC	
2002	Gakuen Toshi Valanoir: KINGDOM OF CHAOS THE UNIVERSE	PS2	
2002	Generation of Chaos NEXT: Ushinawareshi Kizuna	PS2	
2003	Black Stone: Magic & Steel	Xbox	
2003	Cardinal Arc ~Konton no Fuusatsu~	PS2	
2003	Generation of Chaos EXCEED: Yami no Seijou Rose	GameCube	
2003	Generation of Chaos III: Toki no Fuuin	PS2	
2003	Shinki Genso: Spectral Souls	PS2	
2004	Ao no Mama de......	PS2	
2004	Bakuen Kakusei: Neverland Senki ZERO	PS2	
2004	Gakuen Toshi Valanoir Roses	GameCube	
2004	Lost Aya Sophia	PS2	
2004	Steady x Study	PS2	
2004	Shinten Makai Generation of Chaos IV	PS2	
2004	Spectral Force: Radical Elements	PS2	
2004	Tenkuu Danzai Skelter Heaven	PS2	
2005	Fushigi Yugi Genbu Kaiden Gaiden: Kagami no Miko	PS2	
2005	Hametsu no Mars	PS2	
2005	Hoshi no Furu Toki	PS2	
2005	Shinki Gensou Spectral Souls II	PS2	
2005	Shinten Makai Generation of Chaos V	PS2	
2005	Spectral Force Chronicle	PS2	
2005	Spectral Souls: Resurrection of the Ethereal Empires	PSP	
2005	Tsuki wa Kirisaku: Tantei Sagara Kyouichiro	PS2	
2005	It's a Game Now! Dokuro-chan	PS2	
2006	Blazing Souls	PS2; PSP	
2006	Chaos Wars	PS2	
2006	Hiiro no Kakera	DS; PS2	
2006	Shinten Makai Generation of Chaos IV: Another Side	PSP	
2006	Rec: Doki Doki Seiyū Paradise	PS2	
2006	Spectral Force 3: Innocent Rage	Xbox 360	
2007	Aedis Eclipse: Generation of Chaos	PSP	
2007	Absolute: Blazing Infinity	Xbox 360	
2007	Apocalypse: Desire Next	Xbox 360	
2007	Diario: Rebirth Moon Legend	Xbox 360	
2007	Mist of Chaos	PS3	
2007	Record of Agarest War	PS3 Xbox 360	
2007	Spectral Gene	PS2	
2008	Spectral Force Genesis	DS	
2008	Moetan DS	DS	
2008	Neverland Card Battles	PSP	
2009	Wand of Fortune	PS2, PSP	
2009	Nuga-Cel!	PS2	
2010	Wand of Fortune ~Mirai e no Prologue~	PS2, PSP	
2010	Desert Kingdom	PS2	
2010	Natsuzora no Monologue	PS2	
2010	Hanayaka Nari, Waga Ichizoku	PSP	
2010	Clock Zero ~Shuuen no Ichibyou~	PS2, PSP	
2010	Moujuutsukai to Ouji-sama	PS2, PSP	
2010	Motto Nuga-Cel!	PSP	
2010	Trinity Universe	PlayStation 3	
2011	Wand of Fortune 2 ~Jikuu ni Shizumu Mokushiroku~	PSP	
2011	Moujuutsukai to Ouji-sama Snow Bride	PS2, PSP	
2011	Amnesia	PSP, PS Vita, iOS, Android	
2012	Brothers Conflict : Passion Pink	PSP	
2012	Diabolik Lovers	PSP	
2012	Wand of Fortune 2 FD ~Kimi ni Sasageru Epilogue~	PSP	
2012	Amnesia Later	PSP	
2012	Generation of Chaos 6	PSP	
2012	Sweet Fuse	PSP	
2012	Black Wolves Saga -Last Hope-	PSP	
2013	Desert Kingdom Portable	PSP	
2013	Natsuzora no Monologue Portable	PSP	
2013	Norn9 ~Norn + Nonette~	PSP, PS Vita	
2013	Princess Arthur	PSP	
2013	Amnesia Crowd	PSP	
2013	Brothers Conflict : Brilliant Blue	PSP	
2013	Glass Heart Princess	PSP	
2013	Shiratsuyu no Kai	PSP	
2013	Snow Bound Land	PSP	
2013	Jewelic Nightmare	PSP	
2013	Diabolik Lovers : More Blood	PSP	
2013	Amnesia: Memories	PS Vita	
2014	Amnesia Later x Crowd	PS Vita	
2014	Gakuen K -Wonderful School Days-	PSP, PS Vita	
2014	Hakuōki Sweet School Life	PS Vita	
2014	Monster Monpiece	PS Vita	
2014	Shinobi, Koi Utsutsu	PSP, PS Vita	
2014	Amnesia World	PS Vita	
2014	Chronostacia	PSP	
2014	Nekketsu Inou Bukatsu-tan Trigger Kiss	PS Vita	
2014	Code: Realize ~Guardian of Rebirth~	PS Vita	
2014	Diabolik Lovers: Vandead Carnival	PS Vita / PS TV	
2014	Enkeltbillet	PSP	
2015	Psychedelica of the Black Butterfly	PS Vita	
2015	Omega Quintet	PS4	
2015	Norn9 Last Era	PS Vita	
2015	Moujuutsukai to Ouji-sama Flower & Snow	PS Vita	
2015	Reine des Fleurs	PS Vita	
2015	Bad Apple Wars	PS Vita	
2015	Wand of Fortune R	PS Vita	
2015	Hyperdevotion Noire: Goddess Black Heart	PS Vita	
2016	Psychedelica of the Ashen Hawk	PS Vita	
2016	MeiQ: Labyrinth of Death	PS Vita	
2016	Collar × Malice	PS Vita	
2016	Yuukyuu no Tierblade -Lost Chronicle-	PS Vita	
2017	Hana Oboro: Sengoku-den Ranki	PS Vita	
2017	Wand of Fortune R2	PS Vita	
2017	Shiro to Kuro no Alice	PS Vita	
2017	Dark Rose Valkyrie	PS4	
2017	Cyberdimension Neptunia: 4 Goddesses Online	PS4, Windows	

== Games developed ==
Year	Title	Systems	Other developers
1998	Spectral Force 2	PlayStation	
2003	Shinseiki Genso: Spectral Souls	PS2	
2003	Generation of Chaos Exceed	GameCube	
2004	Tenkuu Danzai Skelter Heaven	PS2	
2005	Hametsu no Mars	PS2	
2005	Shinki Gensou Spectral Souls II	PS2	
2005	Spectral Force Chronicle	PS2	
2006	Blazing Souls	PS2	
2006	Chaos Wars	PS2	
2006	Hiiro no Kakera	Nintendo DS; PS2	
2006	Rec: Doki Doki Seiyū Paradise	PS2	
2006	Spectral Force 3: Innocent Rage	Xbox 360	
2007	Absolute: Blazing Infinity	Xbox 360	
2007	Apocalypse: Desire Next	Xbox 360	
2007	Diario: Rebirth Moon Legend	Xbox 360	
2007	Mist of Chaos	PS3	
2007	Spectral Gene	PS2	
2007	Uwasa no Midori-kun!! Natsu Iro Striker	Nintendo DS	
2008	Uwasa no Midori-kun!! Futari no Midori!?	Nintendo DS	
2008	Cross Edge	PS3; Xbox 360	
2009	Hidamari Sketch Dokodemo Sugoroku × 365	Nintendo DS	
2010	Ore no Yome: Anata Dake no Hanayome	Xbox 360	
2010	Trinity Universe	PS3	Nippon Ichi Software, Gust
2011	Hyperdimension Neptunia	PS3	Compile Heart, Nippon Ichi Software, Gust
2011	Spectral Souls		
2012	Hyperdimension Neptunia Mk2	PS3	Compile Heart, Nippon Ichi Software, Gust, 5pb., Comcept
2012	Blazing Souls: Accelate	Android, iOS	
2013	Hyperdimension Neptunia Victory	PS3	Compile Heart
2013	Sorcery Saga: Curse of the Great Curry God	PS Vita	Compile Heart, ZeroDiv
2013	Mugen Souls Z	PS3	Compile Heart, GCREST
2015	ROOT∞REXX	PS Vita	
2015	Megadimension Neptunia VII	PS4	
2015	Trillion 1,000,000,000,000: God of Destruction	PS Vita	Compile Heart, Preapp Partners
2016	Mary Skelter: Nightmares	PS Vita	Compile Heart
2017	Cyberdimension Neptunia: 4 Goddesses Online	PS4, Windows	Compile Heart, Tamsoft

== Otomate games ==
The following sublist consists of otome games developed by Idea Factory's Otomate division.

Year	Title	Systems	Ref.
2005	Fushigi Yuugi Genbu Kaiden Gaiden: Kagami no Miko	PlayStation 2	
2005	Hoshi no Furu Toki	PlayStation 2	
2006	Mitsu x Mitsu Drops: Love x Love Honey Life	PlayStation 2	
2006	Hiiro no Kakera	PlayStation 2	
2007	Hiiro no Kakera ~Ano Sora no Shita de~	PlayStation 2	
2007	Ouran High School Host Club	PlayStation 2	
2007	Hisui no Shizuku - Hiiro no Kakera 2	PlayStation 2	
2007	Will O' Wisp	PlayStation 2	
2007	Towa no Sakura	PlayStation 2	
2008	Petit four	PlayStation 2	
2008	Edel Blume	PlayStation 2	
2008	Fushigi Yuugi Suzaku Ibun	PlayStation 2	
2008	"ppoi!" Hitonatsu no Keiken!?	PlayStation 2	
2008	Soukoku no Kusabi Hiiro no Kakera 3	PlayStation 2	
2008	Hakuouki ~Shinsengumi Kitan~	PlayStation 2	
2008	Kanuchi - Shiroki Tsubasa no Shou	PlayStation 2	
2008	Will o' Wisp ~Easter no Kiseki~	PlayStation 2	
2009	Kanuchi - Kuroki Tsubasa no Shou	PlayStation 2	
2009	Arcobaleno!	PlayStation 2	
2009	Wand Of Fortune	PlayStation 2	
2009	L2 Love×Loop	PlayStation 2	
2009	S.Y.K ~Shinsetsu Saiyuuki~	PlayStation 2	
2009	Hakuouki Zuisouroku	PlayStation 2	
2009	Hiiro no Kakera - Shin Tamayorihime Denshou	PlayStation 2	
2009	Death Connection	PlayStation 2	
2010	Wand Of Fortune ~Mirai e no Prologue~	PlayStation 2	
2010	S.Y.K ~Renshouden~	PlayStation 2	
2010	Desert Kingdom	PlayStation 2	
2010	Moujuutsukai to Ouji-sama	PlayStation 2	
2010	Natsuzora no Monologue	PlayStation 2	
2010	Hakuouki Reimeiroku	PlayStation 2	
2010	Clock Zero ~Shuuen no Ichibyou~	PlayStation 2	
2010	Pandora ~Kimi no Namae o, Boku wa Shiru~	PlayStation 2	
2010	Armen Noir	PlayStation 2	
2011	Moujuutsukai to Ouji-sama ~Snow Bride~	PlayStation 2	
