= Root Rexx =

2015 video game

- Developer: Otomate
- Publisher: Idea Factory
- Platform: PlayStation Vita
- Release: JP: January 22, 2015
- Genres: Visual novel, music rhythm
- Mode: Single-player

Root Rexx, (Note: Japanese: ルートレックス, Hepburn: Rūtorekkusu) stylized as ROOT∞REXX, is an otome visual novel video game developed by Otomate, exclusively released for the PlayStation Vita by Idea Factory on January 22, 2015, in Japan. The game follows Mochizuki Kazune, a teenage girl who meets members of the fictional boy band Rexx.

== Gameplay ==
As a visual novel, players read text to advance the main story, occasionally making decisions on how to progress which ultimately effect the plot's outcome. Like other Otomate produced visual novels, players' story selections influence which of the six band members the main character will romance.

The game also features an optional music rhythm game, with playable tracks being unlocked with different endings achieved during the main story. This side game plays in a manner similar to other touch screen based music video games. Music notes will gradually approach one of several circles located on the same side of the screen, with the player tapping the note once it overlaps with the locked circle. To successfully perform each action one must tap it as the falling timed circle converges on each main circle, or swipe in a direction indicated by an arrow over the note. The timing follows the rhythm of the music. By successfully hitting notes concurrently, a combo can be chained. Occasionally, players will need tap the Vita's back touchscreen. Because these music games are entirely played with the Vita's dual touch screens, this mode is not compatible with the PlayStation TV. By completing a music track, side stories can be unlocked, which function as visual novels akin to the main story.

== Release ==
Originally intended for released in the winter of 2014, the game was eventually released on January 22, 2015. The title was released physically in both standard and limited editions, the later of which included a book and CD, as well as for digital download.

Several pieces of related merchandise was released under the Root Rexx brand. On February 4, 2015, the game's official soundtrack was released, followed by a fan booklet that same month, and a novel in July. In December, a manga based on the game was released, under the name Root Rexx Honey Melody. On February 24, 2016, two drama CDs were released simultaneously.

== Reception ==
Reception

Review score
Publication	Score
Famitsu	28/40

Being a Japanese exclusive, Root Rexx was not reviewed by major international publications. Domestically, Famitsu's four reviewers awarded the game scores of 8, 8, 7, and 6 out of ten, for a collective total of 28/40. Generally, the reviewers enjoyed the overall story but took some issue with certain aspects of the story paths, which they felt could appear as forced.

According to Media Create, Root Rexx was the 21st best selling game for the week of January 19–25, 2015. Famitsu data for the same period reports that the game was the 17th best selling title. Ultimately, the game was not one of the 30 best selling games in Japan for the month of January.
