= Blazing Souls =

2006 video game

- Xbox 360 version cover art
- Developers: Idea Factory, HyperDevbox Japan (Android, iOS)
- Publishers: JP: Idea Factory; NA: Aksys Games (PSP); EU: Rising Star Games (PSP); WW: HyperDevbox Japan (Android, iOS)
- Platforms: PlayStation 2 Xbox 360; PlayStation Portable; Android iOS
- Release: PlayStation 2: JP: January 17, 2006; Xbox 360: JP: March 29, 2007; PlayStation Portable: JP: July 23, 2009; NA: October 19, 2010; EU: June 1, 2012; Android; August 30, 2012 iOS; March 9, 2013
- Genre: Tactical role-playing
- Mode: Single-player

Blazing Souls (ブレイジングソウルズ, Bureijin Souruzu) is a tactical role-playing game developed by Idea Factory and released for the PlayStation 2 in 2006. It was ported to the Xbox 360 in 2007 as Absolute: Blazing Infinity (アブソリュート ブレイジング インフィニティ, Abusoryūto Burejin Infiniti) and to the PlayStation Portable in 2009 as Blazing Souls Accelate (ブレイジングソウルズ アクセレイト, Bureijin Souruzu Akusereito). The latter version was published in 2010 in North America by Aksys Games and in 2012 in Europe by Rising Star Games.

== Gameplay ==
The gameplay is non-linear, allowing the player to progress through the game and the story in whatever order they wish. In addition, instead of having separate screens or maps for exploration and battle, the game features a seamless transition between the two gameplay types.

Actions such as Chain, Charge, Hold, Original Skill, Chain Skill, Special Chain Skill, Break, Break Arts, and Overkill are available during battle. The player can position forces on the battlefield and wait for the right moment to string together the combo attacks using multiple party members, both in melee and at range. Blazing Souls allows the player to create over 200 different items and skills as well as the ability to capture monsters and have them placed within the party.

== Plot ==
Set nearly two decades following the end of the Seven Years' War chronicled in Spectral Souls II's True Ending (modified Rozess Army route) the story follows the somewhat random misadventures of a freelance Contractor named Zelos and crew, who by various circumstances, is at the center of a conflict involving Elemental Cores which both beings called Human Genomes and a group known as the Original Saints are also searching for as these Elemental Cores are both the key to healing the war ravaged world of Neverland and the trigger for enthroning the intended successors of the current humanity, the Human Genome as the new dominant race. Along the way various subplots involving the cast flesh out this "war behind the scenes".
