= Spectral Force 3 =

2006 video game

Spectral Force 3: Innocent Rage
- Developers: Idea Factory; XPEC Entertainment
- Publishers: JP: Idea Factory; NA: Atlus USA
- Series: Spectral Force
- Platform: Xbox 360
- Release: JP: June 29, 2006; NA: July 29, 2008
- Genre: Tactical role-playing
- Mode: Single-player

Spectral Force 3: Innocent Rage (Note: Japanese: スペクトラルフォース3 ～イノセント レイジ～) is a tactical role-playing game developed by Idea Factory for the Xbox 360.

Innocent Rage, like the previous PlayStation 2 Spectral Force titles, takes place in the fantasy world of Neverland, and details the First Neverland War. It is the first entry in the series to be released in the Western Hemisphere, with Atlus securing publishing rights in North America, where the game is simply titled Spectral Force 3.

== Story ==
Following the defeat of Janus, overlord of the demons and ruler of Neverland, in Magic Era 996, a number of separate nations are now locked in a series of nearly endless conflicts. As soldiers fighting in the First Neverland War, the Norius Mercenaries work for whichever side is currently paying them. When their existing leader is killed, a young and raw recruit, Begina, is thrust into the role. Working with his comrade Diaz, Begina seeks to rebuild the team with new members and re-focus their aims with a bit of compassion. Initially fighting for the Army of Flauster, the Norius Mercenaries are able to take missions from any of the nine other factions also seeking to dominate Neverland, ultimately helping to determine the outcome of the war.

During the main campaign the main story involves the Norius mercenaries encountering a mysterious boy being tormented and possessed by demons. After conquering all 9 kingdoms the Norius mercenaries are forced to fight the demons to save the boy and the world. In the conclusion the Norius mercenaries save the boy and take him in after defeating the master demon Neo Hell Gaia.

== Gameplay ==
Spectral Force 3 features a number of gameplay similarities to existing game series, including Suikoden and Fire Emblem. As in the more recent Fire Emblem titles, gameplay is essentially a series of tactical battles broken up by opportunities to improve equipment and converse with members of the team. Although there are missions which must be completed to advance the plot, the player is also free to pursue a number of mercenary contracts for any of the ten warring factions in the game. Doing so increases the level of friendship with that faction, while decreasing the level with any faction which was negatively impacted by the mission. While the player completes contracts, the war rages on around, with each faction trying to seize territory from rivals. After certain missions or game events, entire factions can wind up being eliminated from the map.

Combat uses a turn-based system and takes place on a map divided up into squares, although the grid is only shown when moving. The player can bring up to six party members into a battle, while enemies tend to be significantly more numerous. On each character's turn, he or she can perform a limited number of actions based on available action points (AP). Moving consumes a single action point, while hard, medium, and light attacks consume three, two, or one, respectively. Special abilities use one action point, but consume some number of slowly recharging skill points (SP).

Spectral Force 3 includes a large number of recruitable characters (40+), with each character having unique innate skills and abilities. In addition to generalized techniques which can be equipped, several specialized in-battle mechanics are also included:

- Friendship Gauge (FG) - This gauge builds as members of the team perform attacks against enemies, as well as directly through certain abilities. Once a segment of the bar has been filled, players can issue an "assist" command to have a nearby ally join in an ongoing attack sequence. When two or more segments of the bar are filled, the "teamwork" command allows a character to take an extra full turn. Either of these actions drains the bar by the corresponding amount.
- Rush Gauge (RG) - This gauge allows the entire team (of six characters) to simultaneous attack a single foe through the "battle formation" command, causing large amounts of damage. The gauge itself fills with each "teamwork" or "assist" action. The higher the level of the gauge is when the "battle formation" is executed, the more powerful the attack becomes.

Successfully completing a mission usually earns both a monetary reward as well as various items. Additionally, crates and treasure chests scattered across the battlefield can be looted during the actual mission itself. Many of the items which are found are not themselves usable by characters, but are instead components which can be crafted (for a fee) into pieces of armor, magical rings, or technique scrolls.

== Reception ==
Reception

Review scores
Publication	Score
1Up.com	B-
GameSpy	2.5 of 5
GamesRadar+	7 of 10
IGN	4.9 of 10
Official Xbox Magazine (US)	7.0/10
TeamXbox	6.3 of 10

Arriving in North America roughly two years after being released in Japan, Spectral Force 3 received generally "fair" or "mediocre" grades from non-Japanese game critics. The title was universally panned for having sub-standard graphics, with one reviewer noting that it "... looks no better than your average PS2 title." Many reviewers felt that the game seemed more like a budget title, with GameSpy expounding, "Spectral Force 3 would have been a great Xbox Live Arcade game, but for a game that costs about $60 off the retail shelf, we expect more depth and graphical quality." The same review also pointed out issues with game pacing, with some battles taking too long and being either too easy or too difficult.

Spectral Force 3 did receive positive remarks for having high replayability, in that mission types are diverse and players can choose to support different sides on subsequent playthroughs. Gameplay was found to be solid, if not particularly unique, with GamesRadar following its list of complaints with the comment, "But buried underneath the sometimes slopped-on content is [a] fairly competent strategy game."

Some consumer reviews of Spectral Force 3 have noted a bug when viewing dialogue scenes in which the game freezes. This has gone unpatched as of March 2011.
