= Super Robot Wars XO =

2006 video game from Banpresto

- Developer(s): Banpresto
- Publisher(s): Banpresto
- Series: Super Robot Wars
- Platform(s): Xbox 360
- Release: JP: November 30, 2006
- Genre(s): Tactical role-playing
- Mode(s): Single-player

Super Robot Wars XO (Note: Japanese: スーパーロボット大戦XO, Hepburn: Sūpā Robotto Taisen XO) is a 2006 tactical role-playing video game developed and published by Banpresto for the Xbox 360 in Japan. Part of the company's Super Robot Wars series, it is an updated version of the GameCube installment Super Robot Wars GC (2004). Players control a fleet of mechas from a variety of super robot anime series, including Mobile Suit Gundam and Getter Robo, to defeat opponents on a grid-based map. XO combines tactical role-playing game mechanics with action sequences, which use stylized anime-esque cutscenes unique for each character.

Microsoft enlisted the help of Banpresto and other third-party developers to support the Xbox 360 after its largely unsuccessful launch in Japan. As such, Banpresto designed XO to take advantage of the console's hardware capabilities and online support, specifically the Xbox Live online network service. The online multiplayer game mode was added as a means to provide a unique and fresh take on the series's gameplay that had not been seen in earlier installments. Though XO was well-received for its gameplay and tweaks made to its predecessors, the failure of the Xbox 360 in the region made it a commercial failure and among the franchise's worst-selling titles.

== Gameplay ==
The player engaging in a combat sequence

Super Robot Wars XO is a tactical role-playing game where players control a fleet of mechas that must destroy an alien race plotting to seize control of Earth. These mecha are drawn from a variety of real robot and super robot anime series, such as Mobile Suit Gundam, Getter Robo, and Matchless Raijin-Oh. The gameplay is divided into multiple levels, or "scenarios", that provide more insight on the game's plot with character interactions and cut-ins as the player progresses.

In these scenarios, players move their mecha on a grid-based stage to destroy all of the enemies. Moving a mecha next to an enemy initiates a combat sequence, which uses stylized anime-like cutscenes that are unique for each of the player's mechas. The outcome of these sequences is determined by the mecha's speed, attack power, and weapon accuracy. In addition to a standard single-player campaign, XO features an online multiplayer game mode that allows players to fight with somebody else around the world. The multiplayer mode has players controlling a duo of mechas and engaging in combat scenarios with each other to be the last one standing. Players can also use the online mode to trade items with others and customize their mecha to increase its power or agility.

== Development ==
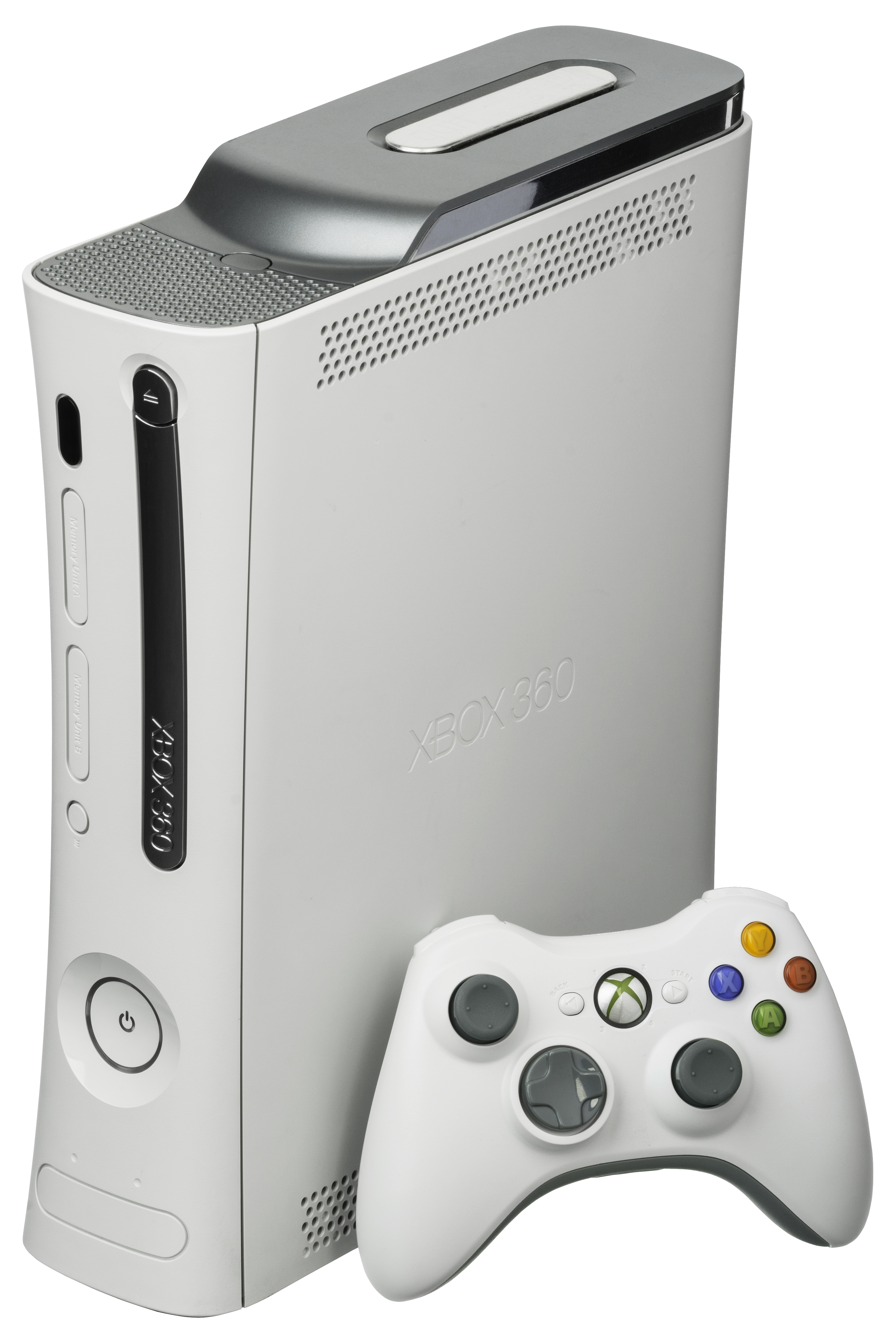
Super Robot Wars XO was designed to take advantage of the Xbox 360's online capabilities.

The launch of the Xbox 360 in Japan in December 2005 was seen as largely unsuccessful. Though the system was a resounding success in North America, it received tepid interest from Japan due to its software library and the console market having already been dominated by Nintendo and Sony. As a way to drive interest in the console and Xbox brand, Microsoft began enlisting the help of third-party developers to begin production of games that catered specifically to the Japanese market. Banpresto was among the first companies to apply, announcing it was developing a new entry in its Super Robot Wars series specifically to take advantage of the console's online and hardware capabilities.

Super Robot Wars XO is an updated version of the GameCube installment Super Robot Wars GC, released in 2004. In addition to expanding on several of the mechanics and concepts in GC, XO contains a number of new additions, such as additional animations and new scenarios and events. As the Xbox 360 possessed powerful graphical capabilities, the development team was able to greatly improve the texture quality and visual effects, which they believed helped to invoke a sense of power in players. The online multiplayer mode was designed to be a different take on the gameplay in the series. Banpresto demonstrated XO at the 2006 Tokyo Game Show event as part of Microsoft's booth, and released the game on November 30. To coincide with its release, a strategy guide by Shiranui Pro was published that detailed its story, setting, and characters. Like most Super Robot Wars games, licensing issues prevented it from seeing an international release. On January 10, 2008, XO was re-released under Microsoft's Platinum Collection budget title label.

== Reception ==
Reception

Review score
Publication	Score
Famitsu	31/40

During its launch week, Super Robot Wars XO sold 4,909 copies, which climbed to 7,812 copies by the end of 2006 and 12,000 by 2007. The Platinum Collection re-release sold less than 3,000. Having sold an estimated 15,000 copies total, significantly less than GC, XO is among the lowest-selling games in the Super Robot Wars series, which has been attributed to the Xbox 360's largely unwelcoming commercial and critical reception in Japan.

Four reviewers from Famitsu were generally impressed with its higher production value and additions to the gameplay of GC. One reviewer positively noted its online multiplayer capabilities, but another was critical at the lack of a tutorial for newer players. In a preview, Ricardo Torres of GameSpot felt that the visuals in XO lacked polish and its 3D cinematics were not very impressive, but its gameplay and tweaks made to GC's mechanics made up for it. Torres said it was "shaping up to be a solid little game", and expressed disappointment at licensing issues preventing a worldwide release.

Gamekult writer Greg believed the online mode would provide little excitement for players, and "seemed a bit anecdotal" to use. However, he complimented the high-resolution textures and short load times, even if the game itself likely would not seem "essential" for Super Robot Wars fans. As part of a retrospective on the series in 2020, USgamer's Kat Bailey ranked XO as being one of the worst entries in the series, which she collectively referred to as the "Scrap Heap". Bailey believed that games like XO were of poor quality since they disregarded what she considered key features of the series in an attempt to be experimental, while replacing its 2D sprite art with unimpressive and featureless 3D models.
