= Spectral Souls: Resurrection of the Ethereal Empires =

2005 video game

- Developer: Idea Factory
- Publishers: NIS America; Ghostlight
- Series: Spectral Souls
- Platforms: PlayStation 2 PlayStation Portable; Android iOS; Windows 8 Windows Phone 8
- Release: PlayStation 2: JP: January 27, 2005; PlayStation Portable: JP: October 22, 2005; NA: September 28, 2006; EU: January 26, 2011; Android: WW: January 15, 2011; iOS: JP: July 11, 2012; WW: July 12, 2012
- Genre: Tactical RPG
- Mode: Single-player

Spectral Souls II (新紀幻想スペクトラルソウルズII, Shinki Gensou Spectral Souls II) is a tactical role playing game developed by Idea Factory and released for the PlayStation 2 in 2005. In 2011, it was ported to the PlayStation Portable as Spectral Souls II: Unlimited Side (新紀幻想 〜SS II アンリミテッドサイド〜) and to mobile devices as Spectral Souls. The PSP port was published both in the U.S. by NIS America and in Europe by Ghostlight under the title Spectral Souls: Resurrection of the Ethereal Empires.

== Development ==
Released on January 27, 2005 for the PlayStation 2, the opening song is "Blue Sky", performed by Dogschool. It is now sold in the Apple App store. Later on, this game was ported to Android and iOS devices.

The iOS port, released on July 11, 2012, solves the problem of the extreme long loading time issue from the PSP port.

== Reception ==
Reception

Aggregate score
Aggregator	Score
Metacritic	47/100

Review scores
Publication	Score
1Up.com	D−
Electronic Gaming Monthly	3.33/10 (Note: Three critics of Electronic Gaming Monthly gave the PSP version each a score of 4.5/10, 2.5/10, and 3/10.)
Famitsu	(PSP) 28/40 (PS2) 26/40
Game Informer	5.5/10
GameSpy	3/5
GameZone	6.9/10
IGN	5.5/10
Official U.S. PlayStation Magazine	3/10
Pocket Gamer	(AND) 3/5
RPGFan	43%

The PSP version was criticized for its long load times. It received "generally unfavorable" reviews according to the review aggregation website Metacritic. In Japan, Famitsu gave it a score of one seven, one six, one seven, and one six for the PlayStation 2 version, and one seven, one six, one seven, and one eight for the PSP version. GamePro called it "a game which -- while nominally a PSP exclusive -- is a landmark in programming incompetence. Exclusive or not, it's a bigger embarrassment than any retro port could have been." (Note: GamePro gave the PSP version 4/5 for graphics, 3.5/5 for sound, 2/5 for control, and 2.5/5 for fun factor.)
