= List of role-playing video games: 2006 to 2007 =

This is a comprehensive index of commercial role-playing video games (RPGs), sorted chronologically by year. Information regarding release platform, release type, RPG subgenre, game setting, developers, publishers, and country of origin is provided where available. The table can be sorted by clicking on the small boxes next to the column headings.

This list includes all RPG subgenres, including MMORPGs, Action RPGs and Tactical RPGs. This list does not include MUDs and Roguelikes by default, unless they have an additional RPG subgenre. For standalone lists on these subgenres, see List of MUDs and List of roguelikes

== Legend ==
Video game platforms
DS	Nintendo DS, DSiWare, iQue DS	GBA	Game Boy Advance, iQue GBA	GCN	GameCube
GEN	Genesis / Mega Drive	LIN	Linux, SteamOS	MAC	Classic Mac OS, 2001 and before
MOBI	Mobile phone	OSX	macOS	PS2	PlayStation 2
PS3	PlayStation 3	PSN	PlayStation Network	PSP	PlayStation Portable
PSV	PlayStation Vita	OSX	macOS	VC	Term not found
Wii	Wii, WiiWare, Wii Virtual Console	WIN	Windows, all versions Windows 95 and up	X360	(replace with XB360)
XBOX	(replace with XB)				

Types of releases
Compilation	A compilation, anthology or collection of several titles, usually (but not always) belonging to the same series
Early access	A game launched in early access is unfinished and thus might contain bugs and glitches or have some of the content missing
Episodic	An episodic video game that is released in batches over a period of time
Expansion	A large-scale DLC to an already existing game that adds new story, areas and additions and/or changes to the game's mechanics
Full release	A full release of a game that launched in early access first
Limited	A special release (often called "Limited" or "Collector's Edition") with bonus collector's material. Often provided to people who pre-order a game
Port	The game first appeared on a different platform and a port was made. The game is like the original, with few or no differences
Remake	The game is an enhanced remake of an original, made using a new engine and/or assets and thus containing completely new sound, graphics and possibly changes to the story and/or gameplay
Remaster	The game is a remaster of an original, released on the same or different platform, with (usually minor) changes to graphics, sound and/or gameplay
Rerelease	The game was re-released on the same platform with no or only minor changes

Video game genres
Action RPG	Action role-playing game	Dungeon crawl	Dungeon crawl	JRPG	Japanese-style role-playing game
MMORPG	Massively multiplayer online RPG	Monster tamer	Monster-taming game	MUD	Multi-user dungeon
Real-time	Real-time game	Roguelike	Roguelike, Roguelite	Sandbox	Sandbox game
Soulslike	Soulslike	Tactical RPG	Tactical role-playing game	Turn-based	Turn-based game

== List ==
Year	Title	Developer	Publisher	Setting	Platform	Release	Subgenre	Series/Notes	COO
2006 (JP/NA)	.hack//G.U. vol.1//Rebirth			Sci-Fi	PS2		Action RPG		
2006 (JP/NA)	.hack//G.U. vol.2//Reminisce			Sci-Fi	PS2		Action RPG	Sequel to .hack//G.U. vol.1//Rebirth.	
2006 (JP); 2007 (NA/EU)	Atelier Iris 3: Grand Phantasm	Gust	Gust; Nippon Ichi; Koei	Fantasy	PS2		Turn-based	Sequel to Atelier Iris 2: The Azoth of Destiny.	
2006 (WW)	Aveyond	Amaranth	Amaranth	Fantasy	WIN		Turn-based		
2006 (WW)	Back to Stone	Hidden Floor	EU: Neko Entertainment / Big Ben Interactive; NA: Graffiti Entertainment / O~3 Entertainment	Fantasy	GBA		Action RPG		FR
2006 (AU)	Baldur's Gate: 4 in 1 Boxset	BioWare	Atari	Fantasy	WIN	Compilation	Real-time turn-based	Compilation of Baldur's Gate, Baldur's Gate II and their expansions.	
2006 (JP/NA)	Baten Kaitos Origins	tri-Crescendo; Monolith	Nintendo	Fantasy	GCN		Card-based RPG	Prequel to Baten Kaitos: Eternal Wings and the Lost Ocean.	
2006 (??)	Beggar Prince	C&E Inc. Super Fighter Team	HanTang International	Fantasy	GEN		Turn-based	English translation of Xin Qigai Wangzi for GEN.	
2006 (JP/NA); 2007 (EU/AU)	Blade Dancer: Lineage of Light	Hit Maker	SCEI; Nippon Ichi; Atari	Fantasy	PSP		Real-time turn-based		
2006 (JP)	Blazing Souls ブレイジングソウルズ	Idea Factory	Idea Factory	Fantasy	PS2		Tactical RPG	Sequel to Shinseiki Genso: Spectral Souls II.	
2006 (JP); 2007 (NA/EU/AU)	Blue Dragon	Mistwalker; Artoon	Microsoft	Fantasy	X360		Turn-based		
2006 (JP); 2010 (EU); 2011 (WW)	Chantelise – A Tale of Two Sisters	EasyGameStation	JP: EasyGameStation; EU: DHM Interactive; WW: Carpe Fulgur	Fantasy	WIN		Action RPG		JP
2006 (JP); 2008 (NA)	Chaos Wars カオスウォーズ	Idea Factory	Idea Factory	Fantasy	PS2		Tactical RPG		
2006 (JP/NA/AU); 2007 (EU)	Children of Mana	Nex	Square Enix; Nintendo	Fantasy	DS		Action RPG		
2006 (JP); 2007 (EU/AU/NA)	Custom Robo Arena	Noise	Nintendo	Robotics	DS		Action RPG	Custom Robo	JP
2006 (NA/EU)	Dark Messiah of Might and Magic	Arkane	Ubisoft	Fantasy	WIN		Action RPG; FPS/RPG		
2006 (NA/EU)	Dark Messiah of Might and Magic: Limited Edition	Arkane	Ubisoft	Fantasy	WIN	Limited	Action RPG; FPS/RPG	Collector's edition of Dark Messiah of Might and Magic.	
2006 (NA)	Deus Ex	Ion Storm	Eidos	Sci-Fi	WIN	Rerelease	FPS/RPG	Rerelease on GameTap. Series debuts.	
2006 (JP/NA)	Digimon World DS	Bandai	Bandai	Sci-Fi, Fantasy	DS		Turn-based		
2006 (JP/NA/EU)	Dirge of Cerberus: Final Fantasy VII	Square Enix	Square Enix	Sci-Fi, Fantasy	PS2		Third-person shooter/RPG hybrid	Sequel to Final Fantasy VII.	
2006 (NA); 2007 (JP)	Dirge of Cerberus Lost Episode: Final Fantasy VII	Square Enix; Ideaworks3D	Square Enix	Sci-Fi, Fantasy	MOBI		Third-person shooter/RPG hybrid	Tie-in with Dirge of Cerberus: Final Fantasy VII.	
2006 (JP); 2007 (NA/EU)	Disgaea: Afternoon of Darkness	Nippon Ichi	Nippon Ichi; Atlus; Koei	Fantasy	PSP	Port	Tactical RPG	Port of Disgaea: Hour of Darkness for PS2.	
2006 (JP/NA/EU/AU)	Disgaea 2: Cursed Memories 魔界戦記ディスガイア2	Nippon Ichi	Nippon Ichi; Koei	Fantasy	PS2		Tactical RPG	Sequel to Disgaea: Hour of Darkness.	
2006 (JP); 2007 (NA); 2008 (EU/AU)	Dragon Quest Monsters: Joker	TOSE	Square Enix	Fantasy	DS		Turn-based	Sequel to Dragon Quest Monsters: Caravan Heart.	
2006 (RU)	Dungeon Cleaners	1C Company	1C Company	Post-apocalyptic	WIN		Action RPG		
2006 (NA)	Dungeon Lords: Collector's Edition	Heuristic Park	DreamCatcher	Fantasy	WIN	Limited	Action RPG	Rerelease of Dungeon Lords for WIN.	
2006 (NA)	Dungeon Siege: Throne of Agony	SuperVillain	2K	Fantasy	PSP		Action RPG	Sequel to Dungeon Siege II.	
2006 (NA/EU)	Dungeon Siege II: Broken World	Gas Powered	2K Games	Fantasy	WIN		Action RPG	Expansion to Dungeon Siege II.	
2006 (NA/EU)	Dungeon Siege II: Deluxe Edition	Gas Powered	2K Games	Fantasy	WIN	Rerelease	Action RPG	Rerelease of Dungeon Siege II including its expansion.	
2006 (NA/EU)	Elder Scrolls IV: Oblivion	Bethesda	2K; Bethesda	Fantasy	X360		Action RPG	Sequel to Elder Scrolls III: Morrowind.	
2006 (NA/EU)	Elder Scrolls IV, The: Oblivion	Bethesda	Bethesda; 2K Games; Ubisoft; 1C Company	Fantasy	WIN		Action RPG	Sequel to The Elder Scrolls III: Morrowind. Features a new "Radiant AI" engine with mixed results.	
2006 (NA/EU)	Elder Scrolls IV, The: Oblivion – Collector's Edition	Bethesda	Bethesda; 2K Games	Fantasy	WIN	Limited	Action RPG	Rerelease of The Elder Scrolls IV: Oblivion. Sequel to The Elder Scrolls III: Morrowind.	
2006 (NA); 2007 (EU)	Elder Scrolls IV, The: Knights of the Nine	Bethesda	Bethesda; Ubisoft; 1C Company	Fantasy	WIN		Action RPG	Expansion to The Elder Scrolls IV: Oblivion.	
2006 (JP/NA/EU)	Enchanted Arms [eM] -eNCHANT arM-	From	From; Ubisoft	Futruistic Fantasy	X360		Turn-based		
2006 (NA/EU/AU)	Field Commander	SOE	SOE	Modern	PSP		Tactical RPG		
2006 (JP)	Final Fantasy; Final Fantasy Mobile			Fantasy	MOBI	Port	Turn-based	Port of Final Fantasy for NES.	
2006 (JP)	Final Fantasy II; Final Fantasy II Mobile			Fantasy	MOBI	Port	Turn-based	Port of Final Fantasy II for NES.	
2006 (JP/NA); 2007 (EU)	Final Fantasy III	Square Enix; Matrix	Square Enix	Fantasy	DS	Remake	Turn-based	Sequel to Final Fantasy II.	
2006 (JP/NA); 2007 (EU)	Final Fantasy V Advance	TOSE	Square Enix; Nintendo	Fantasy	GBA	Remake	Real-time turn-based	Remake of Final Fantasy V for SNES. Sequel to Final Fantasy IV.	
2006 (JP); 2007 (NA/EU)	Final Fantasy VI Advance	TOSE	Square Enix; Nintendo	Fantasy; Sci-Fi	GBA	Port	Real-time turn-based	Port of Final Fantasy VI for SNES. Sequel to Final Fantasy V.	
2006 (JP/NA/EU)	Final Fantasy XII	Square	Square; Square Enix	Fantasy	PS2		Real-time turn-based		
2006 (JP)	Fire Emblem: Monshō no Nazo	Intelligent	Nintendo	Fantasy	VC	Port	Tactical RPG	Port of Fire Emblem: Monsho no Nazo for SNES.	
2006 (JP); 2007 (EU)	Freshly-Picked Tingle's Rosy Rupeeland	Vanpool	Nintendo	Fantasy	DS		Action RPG		
2006 (WW)	Geneforge 4: Rebellion	Spiderweb	Spiderweb	Fantasy	MAC		Turn-based	Sequel to Geneforge 3.	
2006 (JP)	Generation of Chaos V イーディスメモリーズ 〜新天魔界GOCV〜	Neverland	Idea Factory	Fantasy	PS1	Port	Tactical RPG	Port of Generation of Chaos V for PS2; Sequel to Generation of Chaos IV.	
2006 (JP)	Genso Suikoden I&II	Konami	Konami	Sci-Fi, Fantasy	PSP	Port	Turn-based	Port and compilation of Suikoden I and II for PS1.	
2006 (UK)	Gorky 17; Odium	Metropolis	1C Company; TopWare; Monolith	Sci-Fi, Fantasy	LIN	Port	Tactical RPG	Port of Gorky 17 for WIN.	
2006 (EU/NA)	Gothic III	Piranha Bytes	JoWood; Aspyr	Fantasy	WIN		Action RPG	Sequel to Gothic II.	
2006 (DE)	Gothic III: Collector's Edition	Piranha Bytes	JoWood; Aspyr	Fantasy	WIN	Limited	Action RPG	Rerelease of Gothic III for WIN.	
2006 (JP); 2007 (NA); 2008 (EU)	Growlanser: Heritage of War グローランサーV	CareerSoft	Atlus; Rising Star	Fantasy	PS2		Tactical RPG	Sequel to Growlanser IV: Wayfarer of the Time.	
2006 (JP)	Gundam: True Odyssey	Bandai	Bandai	Sci-Fi	PS2	Rerelease	Turn-based	Re-release of Gundam: True Odyssey for PS2.	
2006 (JP); 2007 (NA)	Jeanne dArc	Level-5	SCE	Fantasy	PSP		Tactical RPG		
2006 (JP)	The Legend of Heroes V: A Cagesong of the Ocean 英雄伝説V「海の檻歌」	Nihon Falcom	Nihon Falcom	Fantasy	PSP	Port	Turn-based	Port for WIN. Sequel to The Legend of Heroes IV: A Tear of Vermillion.	
2006 (JP)	The Legend of Heroes: Trails in the Sky 英雄伝説「空の軌跡FC」	Nihon Falcom	Nihon Falcom	Fantasy	PSP	Port	Turn-based	Port for WIN.	
2006 (JP); 2015 (NA/EU)	The Legend of Heroes: Trails in the Sky SC	Nihon Falcom	Xseed Games: JP: Nihon Falcom	Fantasy	WIN, PSP, PS3, PSV		Turn-based	Sequel to The Legend of Heroes: Trails in the Sky	JP
2006 (JP/NA/EU/AU)	Lost Magic	Taito; Garakuta	Taito; Ubisoft	Fantasy	DS		RTS/RPG hybrid		
2006 (NA)	Mage Knight: Apocalypse	InterServ	Namco	Fantasy	WIN		Action RPG	Based on the Mage Knight miniatures wargame.	
2006 (JP/NA); 2007 (EU)	Magical Starsign	Brownie Brown	Nintendo	Fantasy	DS		Turn-based	Sequel to Magical Vacation.	
2006 (JP)	Majin Tensei#Majin Tensei: Blind Thinker 魔神転生	i-revo		Fantasy	WIN	Port	Tactical RPG	Port of Majin Tensei for Super Famicom.	
2006 (JP)	Majin Tensei II: Spiral Nemesis 魔神転生II SPIRAL NEMESIS	i-revo		Fantasy	WIN	Port	Tactical RPG	Port of Majin Tensei II: Spiral Nemesis or Super Famicom. Sequel to Majin Tensei.	
2006 (JP)	Makai Wars	Nippon Ichi		Fantasy	PS3		Tactical RPG		
2006 (NA/EU/AU)	Marvel: Ultimate Alliance	Raven	Activision	Sci-Fi, Fantasy	PS2, PS3, PSP, Wii, X360, XBOX		Action RPG		
2006 (NA/EU/AU)	Marvel: Ultimate Alliance	Barking Lizards	Activision	Sci-Fi, Fantasy	GBA		Action RPG		
2006 (NA)	Marvel: Ultimate Alliance	Beenox	Activision	Superhero	WIN	Port	Action RPG	Port of Marvel: Ultimate Alliance for Xbox 360.	
2006 (JP)	Monster Hunter 2	Capcom	Capcom	Fantasy	PS2		Action RPG	Sequel of Monster Hunter for PS2.	JP
2006 (JP)	Mother 3	Nintendo SPD; HAL; Brownie Brown	Nintendo	Sci-Fi, Fantasy	GBA		Turn-based	Sequel to EarthBound.	JP
2006 (NA)	Neverwinter Nights: Infinite Dungeons	BioWare	Atari; MacSoft	Fantasy	LIN, OSX, WIN		Real-time turn-based	Neverwinter Nights premium module.	
2006 (NA/AU)	Neverwinter Nights 2	Obsidian	Atari	Fantasy	WIN		Real-time turn-based	Sequel to Neverwinter Nights.	
2006 (EU)	Neverwinter Nights 2: Chaotic Evil Edition	Obsidian	Aspyr	Fantasy	WIN	Compilation	Real-time turn-based	Compilation of Neverwinter Nights, its expansions, and Neverwinter Nights 2.	
2006 (EU)	Neverwinter Nights 2: Lawful Good Edition	Obsidian	Aspyr	Fantasy	WIN	Compilation	Real-time turn-based	Compilation of Neverwinter Nights, its expansions, and Neverwinter Nights 2.	
2006 (NA/AU)	Neverwinter Nights 2: Limited Edition	Obsidian	Atari	Fantasy	WIN	Limited	Real-time turn-based	Rerelease of Neverwinter Nights 2 for WIN. Sequel to Neverwinter Nights.	
2006 (JP); 2007 (NA); 2008 (EU)	Persona 3	Atlus	Atlus; Koei; THQ	Modern Fantasy	PS2		Turn-based	Sequel to Persona 2: Eternal Punishment.	
2006 (JP/NA/EU/AU)	Phantasy Star Universe			Fantasy	PS2, X360		Action RPG		JP
2006 (JP); 2007 (NA/EU/AU)	Pokémon Diamond	Game Freak	Nintendo	Modern Fantasy	DS		Turn-based	Sequel to Pokémon Ruby and Pokémon Sapphire.	JP
2006 (JP); 2007 (NA/EU/AU)	Pokémon Pearl	Game Freak	Nintendo	Modern Fantasy	DS		Turn-based	Sequel to Pokémon Ruby and Pokémon Sapphire.	JP
2006 (JP/NA/AU); 2007 (EU)	Pokémon Ranger	HAL	Nintendo	Modern Fantasy	DS		Action RPG		JP
2006 (JP)	Remindelight	Japan Art Media	Taito	Fantasy	DS		Action RPG		JP
2006 (JP); 2007 (NA); 2008 (EU/AU)	Riviera: The Promised Land	Sting	Sting; Atlus; 505	Fantasy	PSP	Remake	Turn-based	Remake of Riviera: The Promised Land for WSC.	
2006 (JP)	Sakura Taisen	Red; Overworks	Sega	Steampunk	PSP	Port	Tactical RPG	Port of Sakura Taisen for SAT. Series debuts.	
2006 (JP)	Sakura Taisen 1&2	Red; Overworks	Sega	Steampunk	PSP	Compilation	Tactical RPG	Port and compilation of Sakura Taisen and Sakura Taisen 2 for SAT. Series debuts.	
2006 (JP)	Sakura Taisen 2: Kimi, Shinitamou koto Nakare	Red; Overworks	Sega	Steampunk	PSP	Port	Tactical RPG	Port of Sakura Taisen 2 for SAT. Sequel to Sakura Taisen.	
2006 (JP/NA); 2007 (EU)	Shin Megami Tensei: Devil Summoner: Raidou Kuzunoha vs. The Soulless Army	Atlus	Atlus; Koei	Historical, Fantasy	PS2		Action RPG	Sequel to Shin Megami Tensei: Devil Summoner.	
2006 (JP); 2008 (NA)	Spectral Force 3: Innocent Rage スペクトラルフォース3 イノセントレイジ	Idea Factory	Idea Factory; Atlus	Fantasy	X360		Tactical RPG	Sequel to Spectral Force II.	
2006 (WW)	SpellForce 2: Shadow Wars	Phenomic	EU: JoWooD Productions; EU: Deep Silver; NA: Aspyr Media; NA: Dreamcatcher Interactive; AU: Auran	Fantasy	WIN		Action RPG	SpellForce	DE
2006 (RU/EU); 2007 (WW)	Star Wolves 2	Xbow	1C Company	Sci-Fi	WIN		Tactical RPG; Real-time	Sequel to Star Wolves.	
2006 (JP/NA/EU/AU)	Suikoden V	Konami; Hudson Soft	Konami	Fantasy	PS2		Turn-based	Sequel to Suikoden IV.	
2006 (??)	Summon Night 4	Flight-Plan	Banpresto	Steampunk	PS2		Tactical RPG	Sequel to Summon Night 3.	
2006 (JP)	Super Robot Wars Advance i	Banpresto	Banpresto	Sci-Fi	MOBI	Port	Tactical RPG	Port of Super Robot Wars Advance for GBA.	
2006 (JP)	Tales of Destiny	Wolf Team	Namco	Fantasy	PS2	Remake	Action RPG	Remake of Tales of Destiny for PS1.	
2006 (JP)	Tales of Phantasia	Mineloader	Namco	Fantasy	PSP	Remake	Action RPG	Remake of Tales of Phantasia for SNES. Series debuts.	
2006 (JP)	Tales of the Tempest	Dimps; Namco Tales	Namco Bandai	Fantasy	DS		Action RPG		
2006 (JP); 2007 (NA/EU)	Tales of the World: Radiant Mythology	Alfa System	Namco Bandai	Fantasy	PSP		Action RPG	Spin-off of the Tales series.	
2006 (JP)	Tales of Wahrheit			Fantasy	MOBI		Action RPG		
2006 (JP)	Tales of Wahrheit Colosseum			Fantasy	MOBI		Action RPG		
2006 (JP)	Tengai Makyō: Daiyon no Mokushiroku	Red Ent.	Hudson Soft	Fantasy	PSP	Remake	Turn-based	Remake of Tengai Makyō: Daiyon no Mokushiroku for SAT.	
2006 (JP)	Tengai Makyō II: Manjimaru	Red Ent.	Hudson Soft	Fantasy	DS, PS2	Remake	Turn-based	Remake of Tengai Makyō II: Manjimaru for PCE. Sequel to Tengai Makyō: Ziria.	
2006 (JP)	Tengai Makyou Ziria: Haruka naru Jipang	Hudson Soft	Hudson Soft	Fantasy	XBOX	Remake	Turn-based	Remake of Tengai Makyō: Ziria for PCE.	
2006 (NA/EU)	Titan Quest	Iron Lore	THQ	Fantasy; Mythology	WIN		Action RPG	Series debuts.	
2006 (EU)	Titan Quest: Limited Edition	Iron Lore	THQ	Fantasy; Mythology	WIN	Limited	Action RPG	Rerelease of Titan Quest.	
2006 (UK)	Ultimate Dungeons & Dragons	Various	Atari	Fantasy	WIN	Compilation	Real-time turn-based	Large compilation featuring the Baldur's Gate, Icewind Dale and Neverwinter Nights series in their entirety, as well as a few others.	
2006 (NA); 2007 (EU)	Untold Legends: Dark Kingdom	SOE	SOE	Fantasy	PS3		Action RPG		
2006 (JP/NA/EU/AU)	Untold Legends: The Warrior's Code	SOE	SOE	Fantasy	PSP		Action RPG	Sequel to Untold Legends: Brotherhood of the Blade.	
2006 (JP)	Utawarerumono	Leaf	Aquaplus	Fantasy	PS2	Port	Tactical RPG	Port of Utawarerumono for PC.	
2006 (JP/NA); 2007 (EU/AU)	Valkyrie Profile: Lenneth ヴァルキリープロファイル レナス	tri-Ace	Square Enix	Fantasy	PSP		Real-time turn-based	Port of Valkyrie Profile for PS1.	
2006 (JP/NA); 2007 (EU)	Valkyrie Profile 2: Silmeria ヴァルキリープロファイル2 シルメリア	tri-Ace	Square Enix	Fantasy	PS2		Real-time turn-based	Sequel to Valkyrie Profile.	
2006 (JP); 2007 (NA); 2008 (EU)	Wild ARMs 5	Media.Vision	SCE; XSEED; 505	Steampunk	PS2		Turn-based	Sequel to Wild ARMs 4.	
2006 (JP/NA)	Xenosaga Episode III: Also sprach Zarathustra	Monolith	Namco Bandai	Sci-Fi, Fantasy	PS2		Turn-based	Sequel to Xenosaga Episode II: Jenseits von Gut und Böse.	
2006 (TW)	Xuan-Yuan Sword 5	DOMO Studio	Softstar Entertainment	Fantasy	WIN		Action RPG	Xuan-Yuan Sword	TW
2006 (JP/NA)	Yggdra Union: We'll Never Fight Alone ユグドラ・ユニオン	Sting	Sting; Atlus	Fantasy	GBA		Tactical RPG	Sequel to Riviera: The Promised Land for WSC.	
2006 (??)	Ys V: Lost Kefin, Kingdom of Sand	Taito		Fantasy	PS2	Remake	Action RPG	Remake of the SNES game	
2006 (JP/NA/EU/AU)	Ys VI: The Ark of Napishtim	Konami	Konami	Fantasy	PSP	Port	Action RPG	Port of Ys VI: The Ark of Napishtim for PC.	
2006 (JP)	Ys Origin	Nihon Falcom	Nihon Falcom	Fantasy	WIN		Action RPG	Prequel to Ys I: Ancient Ys Vanished.	
2007 (JP/NA)	.hack//G.U. vol.3//Redemption			Sci-Fi	PS2		Action RPG	Sequel to .hack//G.U. vol.2//Reminisce.	
2007 (RU); 2008 (NA)	7.62	Apeiron	1C Company	Modern	WIN		Tactical RPG; Real-time	Sequel to Brigade E5: New Jagged Union.	
2007 (JP)	Absolute: Blazing Infinity アブソリュート ブレイジングインフィニティ	Idea Factory	Idea Factory	Fantasy	X360	Port	Tactical RPG	Port of Blazing Souls for PS2.	
2007 (JP)	Aedis Eclipse: Generation of Chaos	Neveralnd		Fantasy	PSP		Tactical RPG	Sequel to Generation of Chaos.	
2007 (JP)	Apocalypse: Desire Next	Idea Factory		Fantasy	X360		Tactical RPG		
2007 (WW)	Arkadian Warriors	Wanako Games	Sierra Online	Fantasy	X360		Action RPG		CL
2007 (JP); TBD (NA)	ASH: Archaic Sealed Heat	Mistwalker; Racjin	Nintendo	Fantasy	DS		Tactical RPG		
2007	Avencast: Rise of the Mage	ClockStone	Lighthouse Interactive	Fantasy	WIN		Action RPG		
2007 (JP)	Bahamut Senki	Sega	Sega	Fantasy	VC	Port	Tactical RPG	Port of Bahamut Senki for SMS.	
2007 (JP/NA/EU)	Breath of Fire II			Fantasy	VC	Port	Turn-based	Port of Breath of Fire II for the SNES. Sequel to Breath of Fire.	
2007 (NA)	Call for Heroes: Pompolic Wars	Quotix Software	Strategy First	Historical	WIN		Action RPG		RS
2007 (NA/EU/AU)	Code Lyoko	DC Studios	The Game Factory	Science Fiction	DS		Action RPG	Based on the television series of the same name	GB
2007 (JP); 2008 (NA/EU)	Crisis Core: Final Fantasy VII	Square Enix	Square Enix	Fantasy	PSP		Action RPG	Prequel to Final Fantasy VII.	
2007 (RU)	Day Watch	Nival		Modern Fantasy	WIN		Tactical RPG	Sequel to Night Watch.	
2007 (NA); 2008 (WW)	Depths of Peril	Soldak	Soldak	Fantasy	WIN		Action RPG		
2007 (JP/NA)	Digimon World: Dawn	Bandai	Bandai	Sci-Fi, Fantasy	DS		Turn-based		
2007 (JP/NA)	Digimon World: Dusk	Bandai	Bandai	Sci-Fi, Fantasy	DS		Turn-based		
2007 (NA)	Disgaea: Afternoon of Darkness; Disgaea Portable	Nippon Ichi		Fantasy	PSP	Remake	Tactical RPG	Remake of Disgaea: Hour of Darkness for PS2.	
2007 (JP)	Dragon Knight IV ドラゴンナイト4	ELF	ELF	Fantasy	WIN	Remake	Tactical RPG; Eroge	Port of Dragon Knight IV for PC98. Sequel to Dragon Knight III.	
2007 (JP); 2008 (NA/EU); TBA (AU)	Dragon Quest IV	ArtePiazza	Square Enix	Fantasy	DS	Remake	Turn-based	Remake of Dragon Quest IV for NES.	
2007 (JP); 2008 (NA/EU/AU)	Dragon Quest Swords: The Masked Queen and the Tower of Mirrors	Eighting; Genius Sonority	Square Enix	Fantasy	Wii		Action RPG		
2007 (JP)	Dragon Slayer: The Legend of Heroes	Nihon Falcom	Nihon Falcom	Fantasy	VC	Port	Turn-based	Port of Dragon Slayer: The Legend of Heroes for PC88.	
2007 (JP)	Dungeon Explorer: Warriors of Ancient Arts	Amble	JP/NA: Hudson Soft; EU: Rising Star Games	Fantasy	DS, PSP		Action RPG		JP
2007 (NA/EU/AU)	Dungeons & Dragons Tactics	Kuju	Atari	Fantasy	PSP		Tactical RPG		
2007 (NA/EU/AU)	Elder Scrolls IV: Oblivion	Bethesda	2K; Bethesda	Fantasy	PS3	Port	Action RPG	Port of Elder Scrolls IV: Oblivion for X360. Sequel to Elder Scrolls III: Morrowind.	
2007 (NA/EU)	Elder Scrolls IV, The: Oblivion – Game of the Year Edition	Bethesda	Bethesda; 2K Games	Fantasy	WIN	Rerelease	Action RPG	Rerelease of The Elder Scrolls IV: Oblivion for WIN. Sequel to The Elder Scrolls III: Morrowind.	
2007 (NA/EU)	Elder Scrolls IV, The: Shivering Isles	Bethesda	Bethesda; 2K Games; 1C Company	Fantasy	WIN		Action RPG	Expansion to The Elder Scrolls IV: Oblivion.	
2007 (JP)	Elvandia Story エルヴァンディアストーリー	Spike		Fantasy	PS2		Tactical RPG		
2007 (JP/NA/EU)	Enchanted Arms; Enchant Arm	From	From; Ubisoft	Futruistic Fantasy	PS3	Port	Turn-based	Port of Enchanted Arms for X360.	
2007 (WW)	Eschalon: Book I	Basilisk	Basilisk	Fantasy	LIN, OSX, WIN		Turn-based		
2007 (JP)	Esper Dream	Konami	Konami	Fantasy	VC	Port	Action RPG	Port of Esper Dream for NES.	
2007 (JP/NA/EU/AU)	Eternal Sonata	tri-Crescendo	Namco Bandai	Fantasy	X360		Real-time turn-based		
2007 (JP/NA); 2008 (EU/AU)	Etrian Odyssey	Atlus	Atlus; Nintendo	Fantasy	DS		Turn-based; Dungeon crawl		
2007 (EU); 2008 (NA)	Falling Stars	Ivolgamus	Agetec	Fantasy	PS2		Action RPG		
2007 (EU)	Falling Stars	Ivolgamus	Agetec	Fantasy	WIN		Action RPG		
2007 (CN)	Fantasia Sango III	UserJoy Technology	Unistar	Fantasy	WIN		Turn-based	Sequel to Fantasia Sango II.	
2007 (CN)	Fantasia Sango IV	UserJoy Technology	Unistar	Fantasy	WIN		Turn-based	Sequel to Fantasia Sango III.	
2007 (JP/NA); 2008 (EU/AU)	Final Fantasy	Square	Square Enix	Fantasy	PSP	Port	Turn-based	Port of Final Fantasy for NES.	
2007 (JP/NA); 2008 (EU)	Final Fantasy II	Square	Square Enix	Fantasy	PSP	Port	Turn-based	Port of Final Fantasy II for NES.	
2007 (JP); 2008 (NA)	Final Fantasy IV	Square; Matrix Software	Square Enix	Fantasy	DS	Remake	Real-time turn-based	Remake of Final Fantasy IV for SNES.	
2007 (JP/NA); 2008 (EU)	Final Fantasy XII: Revenant Wings	Square Enix	Square Enix	Fantasy	DS		Tactical RPG; Real-time	Continuation of Final Fantasy XII.	
2007 (JP); 2008 (NA/AU/EU)	Final Fantasy Crystal Chronicles: Ring of Fates	Square Enix	Square Enix	Fantasy	DS	Original	Action RPG	Prequel to Final Fantasy Crystal Chronicles	JP
2007 (JP)	Final Fantasy Legend	Square	Square	Fantasy	MOBI	Port	Turn-based	Port of Final Fantasy Legend for GB.	
2007 (JP/NA/EU/AU)	Final Fantasy Tactics: The War of the Lions	Square Enix	Square Enix	Fantasy	PSP	Remake	Tactical RPG	Remake of Final Fantasy Tactics for PS1.	
2007 (JP); 2008 (NA/EU/AU)	Final Fantasy Tactics A2: Grimoire of the Rift ファイナルファンタジータクティクス A2 封穴のグリモア	Square Enix	Square Enix	Fantasy	DS		Tactical RPG	Sequel to Final Fantasy Tactics Advance for GBA.	
2007 (JP/NA); 2008 (EU/AU)	Fire Emblem: Radiant Dawn	Intelligent	Nintendo	Fantasy	Wii		Tactical RPG	Sequel to Fire Emblem: Path of Radiance.	
2007 (JP)	Fire Emblem: Seisen no Keifu	Intelligent	Nintendo	Fantasy	VC	Port	Tactical RPG	Port of Fire Emblem: Seisen no Keifu for SNES.	
2007 (WW)	Folklore	Game Republic	Sony Computer Entertainment	Irish mythology	PS3		Action RPG		JP
2007 (NA)	Forgiveness: The Second Chapter	Breakthrough			WIN		Turn-based	Sequel to Forgiveness: The First Chapter.	
2007 (JP/NA)	Front Mission	Square Enix	Square Enix	Sci-Fi	DS	Remake	Tactical RPG	Remake of Front Mission for SNES. Series debuts.	
2007 (WW)	Geneforge 4: Rebellion	Spiderweb	Spiderweb	Fantasy	WIN	Port	Turn-based	Port of Geneforge 4: Rebellion for MAC. Sequel to Geneforge 3.	
2007 (DE)	Gothic Universe	Piranha Bytes	JoWood; Aspyr	Fantasy	WIN		Action RPG	Compilation of Gothic, Gothic II, Gothic II: Night of the Raven and Gothic III for WIN.	
2007 (JP)	Growlanser VI: Precarious World	CareerSoft		Sci-Fi	PS2		Tactical RPG; Real-time	Sequel to Growlanser V: Generations.	
2007 (NA/EU)	Hellgate: London	Flagship	Namco Bandai; EA	Fantasy; Post-apocalyptic	WIN		Action RPG; Roguelike; FPS/RPG	Created by the lead developers of Diablo series.	
2007 (NA/EU)	Hellgate: London - Collector's Edition	Flagship	Namco Bandai; EA	Fantasy; Post-apocalyptic	WIN	Limited	Action RPG; Roguelike; FPS/RPG	Collector's edition version of Hellgate: London.	
2007 (JP)	Heracles no Eikō III: Kamigami no Chinmoku	Data East	Paon	Fantasy	VC	Port	Turn-based	Port of Heracles no Eikō III: Kamigami no Chinmoku for SNES. Sequel to Heracles no Eikō II: Titan no Metsubō.	
2007 (JP/NA/EU)	Heroes of Mana	Brownie Brown	Square Enix	Fantasy	DS		RTS/RPG hybrid	Prequel to Seiken Densetsu 3.	
2007 (RU); 2008 (EU); TBD (NA)	Hired Guns: The Jagged Edge; ДЖАЗ: Работа по найму	GFI Russia	Game Factory	Modern	WIN		Tactical RPG		
2007 (JP/NA/EU)	Hoshigami Remix	Arc System Works	ASNetworks; Aksys; 505	Fantasy	DS	Remake	Tactical RPG	Remake of Hoshigami: Ruining Blue Earth for PS1.	
2007 (NA)	InuYasha: Secret of the Divine Jewel	Namco Bandai	Namco Bandai	Fantasy	DS		Turn-based		
2007 (NA/EU/AU)	Jade Empire: Special Edition	BioWare	2K Games	Fantasy	WIN	Port	Action RPG	Port of Jade Empire for Xbox.	
2007 (WW)	Kingdom Hearts II Final Mix	Square Enix	Square Enix; Buena Vista	Fantasy	PS2	Rerelease	Action RPG	Re-release of Kingdom Hearts II for PS2. Sequel to Kingdom Hearts: Chain of Memories.	
2007 (WW)	Kingdom Hearts Re: Chain of Memories	Square Enix; Jupiter	Square Enix; Nintendo	Fantasy	PS2	Remake	Action RPG	Remake of Kingdom Hearts: Chain of Memories for GBA.	
2007 (JP)	Langrisser II; Der Langrisser ラングリッサーII			Fantasy	VC		Tactical RPG	Port of Langrisser II for GEN. Sequel to Warsong.	
2007 (DE); 2008 (NA)	Legend: Hand of God	Master Creating GMBH	Anaconda(DE/EU) ValuSoft/THQ(NA/INT)	Fantasy	WIN		Action RPG		
2007 (JP)	Legend of Heroes, The: Sora no Kiseki SC 英雄伝説「空の軌跡SC」	Nihon Falcom	Nihon Falcom	Fantasy	PSP	Port	Turn-based	Port of Legend of Heroes, The: Sora no Kiseki SC for WIN. Sequel to The Legend of Heroes VI: Sora no Kiseki FC.	
2007 (JP)	Legend of Heroes, The: Sora no Kiseki the 3rd 英雄伝説「空の軌跡 the 3rd」	Nihon Falcom	Nihon Falcom	Fantasy	WIN		Turn-based	Sequel to The Legend of Heroes: Sora no Kiseki SC.	
2007 (WW)	Loki	Cyanide	Focus Home; Crimson Cow	Fantasy	WIN		Action RPG		
2007 (JP); 2008 (NA/EU/AU)	Lost Odyssey	Mistwalker feelplus	Microsoft	Fantasy	X360		Turn-based		
2007 (JP/NA/EU)	Luminous Arc ルミナスアーク	Image Epoch	Marvelous; Atlus; Rising Star	Fantasy	DS		Tactical RPG		
2007 (JP)	Magician's Academy まじしゃんず・あかでみい	Enterbrain	Enterbrain	Modern Fantasy	PS2		Tactical RPG	Based on the anime of the same name.	
2007 (JP)	Majin Tensei: Blind Thinker 魔神転生 blind thinker		Atlus; BBMF	Fantasy	MOBI		Tactical RPG		
2007 (JP); 2008 (NA)	Mana Khemia: Alchemists of Al-Revis	Gust	Gust; Nippon Ichi	Fantasy	PS2		Turn-based		
2007 (NA/EU/AU)	Mass Effect	BioWare	Microsoft	Sci-Fi	X360		Action RPG		
2007 (??)	Metal Max 2			Fantasy	VC	Port	Turn-based	Port of Metal Max 2 for SNES.	
2007 (JP)	Mist of Chaos	Neverland		Fantasy	PS3		Tactical RPG		
2007 (JP/NA/EU/AU)	Monster Hunter Freedom 2 Monster Hunter Portable 2nd	Capcom	Capcom	Fantasy	PSP	Remake	Action RPG	Remake of Monster Hunter 2 for PS2.	
2007 (NA)	Nethergate: Resurrection	Spiderweb	Spiderweb	Historical, Fantasy	MAC, WIN		Turn-based	Remake of Nethergate.	
2007 (EU)	Neverwinter Nights: 3-Pack	BioWare; Floodgate	Atari	Fantasy	WIN	Compilation	Real-time turn-based	Compilation of Neverwinter Nights and its expansions.	
2007 (NA/UK)	Neverwinter Nights 2: Mask of the Betrayer	Obsidian	Atari	Fantasy	WIN		Real-time turn-based	Expansion for Neverwinter Nights 2.	
2007 (JP); 2008 (NA)	Operation Darkness	Success		Fantasy; Historical	XBOX		Tactical RPG		
2007 (JP); 2008 (NA/EU)	Opoona	ArtePiazza	Koei	Sci-Fi	Wii		Real-time turn-based		
2007 (JP/NA/EU)	Paper Mario	Intelligent	Nintendo	Fantasy	VC	Port	Turn-based	Port of Paper Mario for N64.	
2007 (JP); 2008 (NA/EU)	Persona 3 FES	Atlus	Atlus; Koei; THQ	Modern Fantasy	PS2	Remake	Turn-based	Remake and expansion of Persona 3 for PS2. Sequel to Persona 2: Eternal Punishment.	
2007 (JP)	Record of Agarest War アガレスト戦記	Idea Factory	Compile Heart; Red	Fantasy	PS3		Tactical RPG		
2007 (JP)	Riviera: The Promised Land - Special Edition	Sting	Sting	Fantasy	PSP	Rerelease	Turn-based	Re-release of Riviera: The Promised Land for PSP.	
2007 (JP); 2008 (NA)	Rondo of Swords 偽りの輪舞曲	Success	Success	Fantasy	DS		Tactical RPG		
2007 (JP)	Shining Force EXA シャイニング・フォース イクサ	Neveralnd	Sega	Fantasy	PS2		Action RPG	Sequel to Shining Force Neo.	
2007 (JP/NA/EU)	Shining Force: The Legacy of Great Intention シャイニング・フォース 神々の遺産		Sega	Fantasy	VC	Port	Tactical RPG	Port of Shining Force: The Legacy of Great Intention for GEN.	
2007 (JP/NA/EU)	Shining in the Darkness	Climax; Sonic!	Sega	Fantasy	VC	Port	Turn-based; Dungeon crawl	Port of Shining in the Darkness for GEN.	
2007 (JP)	Shining Wind シャイニング・ウィンド	Nex Entertainment	Sega	Fantasy	PS2		Action RPG	Sequel to Shining Tears.	
2007 (WW)	Silverfall	Monte Cristo; Kyiv's Games	Monte Cristo; Atari	Fantasy	WIN		Action RPG		
2007 (JP/NA); 2008 (EU)	Soul Nomad & the World Eaters	Nippon Ichi	Nippon Ichi	Fantasy	PS2		Tactical RPG		
2007 (JP)	Spectral Gene	Idea Factory		Fantasy	PS2		Tactical RPG		
2007 (JP); 2008 (NA)	Star Ocean: The First Departure	tri-Ace	Square Enix	Fantasy	PSP		Action RPG	Remake of Star Ocean: Fantastic Space Odyssey for SNES.	
2007 (JP); 2008 (NA)	Summon Night: Twin Age	Flight-Plan	Atlus	Steampunk	DS		Action RPG		
2007 (JP/NA/EU/AU)	Super Paper Mario	Intelligent	Nintendo	Fantasy	Wii		Action RPG		
2007 (JP)	Super Robot Wars: Original Generations	Banpresto	Banpresto	Sci-Fi	PS2	Remake	Tactical RPG	Remake and compilation of Super Robot Wars: Original Generation and Super Robot Wars: Original Generation 2 for GBA.	
2007 (JP)	Super Robot Wars A Portable	Banpresto	Banpresto	Sci-Fi	PSP	Remake	Tactical RPG	Remake of Super Robot Wars A for GBA.	
2007 (JP)	Super Robot Wars Original Generation Gaiden	Banpresto	Banpresto	Sci-Fi	PS2		Tactical RPG	Sequel to Super Robot Wars Original Generations.	
2007 (JP)	Super Robot Wars W	Banpresto	Banpresto	Sci-Fi	DS		Tactical RPG		
2007 (JP/NA/EU)	Sword of Vermilion	Sega-AM2	Sega	Fantasy	VC	Port	Action RPG	Port of Sword of Vermilion for GEN.	
2007 (JP)	Tales of Destiny 2	Alfa System	Namco	Fantasy	PSP	Remake	Action RPG	Remake of Tales of Destiny 2 for PS2. Sequel to Tales of Destiny.	
2007 (JP)	Tales of Innocence	Alfa System	Namco Bandai	Fantasy	DS		Action RPG		
2007 (JP)	Tears to Tiara: Kakan no Daichi	Leaf		Fantasy	PS3	Port	Tactical RPG	Port of Tears to Tiara.	
2007 (UK); 2008 (WW)	Titan Quest: Gold Edition	Iron Lore	THQ	Fantasy; Mythology	WIN	Compilation	Action RPG	Compilation of Titan Quest and its expansion.	
2007 (NA/EU)	Titan Quest: Immortal Throne	Iron Lore	THQ	Fantasy; Mythology	WIN		Action RPG	Expansion for Titan Quest.	
2007 (JP)	Treasure Hunter G	Sting	Square	Fantasy	VC	Port	Tactical RPG	Port of Treasure Hunter G for SNES.	
2007 (NA/EU/AU)	Two Worlds	Reality Pump	SouthPeak Games	Fantasy	X360		Action RPG		
2007 (WW)	Urban Legend	ELENS	ELENS	Sci-Fi	WIN		Tactical RPG		
2007 (JP/NA/EU/AU)	Unknown Realms	Game Republic	SCEI	Fantasy	PS3		Action RPG		
2007 (??)	Wild Arms	Media.Vision	SCE	Steampunk	PSN	Port	Turn-based	Port of Wild Arms for PS1.	
2007 (JP); 2008 (NA)	Wild Arms XF ワイルドアームズ クロスファイア	Media.Vision	SCE	Steampunk	PSP		Tactical RPG		
2007 (EU/NA/AU)	Witcher, The; Wiedźmin	CD Projekt	Atari	Fantasy	WIN		Action RPG	Based on the novels of the same name.	
2007 (JP); 2008 (NA/EU/AU)	World Ends With You, The	Jupiter	Square Enix	Modern Fantasy	DS		Action RPG		
2007 (JP); 2008 (NA); TBA (EU)	Ys I & II	Nihon Falcom; Hudson Soft	Hudson Soft	Fantasy	VC	Port	Action RPG	Port of Ys I & II for PCD.	
