= Tengai Makyō: Fuun Kabukiden =

1993 video game

Tengai Makyō: Fū-un Kabuki-den
- Developers: Red Company; Hudson Soft
- Publisher: Hudson Soft
- Director: Yuji Kudo
- Producer: Takeshi Takebe
- Writer: Kouji Arai
- Composers: Kohei Tanaka; Keita Hoshi
- Series: Tengai Makyō
- Platform: PC Engine Super CD-ROM²
- Release: April 10, 1993
- Genre: Role-playing
- Mode: Single-player

Tengai Makyō: Fū-un Kabuki-den (天外魔境・風雲カブキ伝), also known as Far East of Eden: Fū-un Kabuki-den, is a 1993 role-playing video game developed by Red Company and published by Hudson Soft for the PC Engine Super CD-ROM². It is the third game in the Tengai Makyō series, and a spin-off of Tengai Makyō II: Manji Maru, however it did not see its release outside of Japan.

== Gameplay ==
Gameplay-wise, it is very similar to the preceding game. The player navigates Kabuki and other characters who join the party on a large top-down overworld, visiting various towns and villages, exploring dungeons, and fighting randomly appearing enemies in turn-based combat. Unlike the previous two games, the battles are viewed from a third-person perspective identical to the combat view of contemporary Final Fantasy games. Like in the other games in the series, magic must be found rather than learned, and can be freely swapped between characters.

== Story ==
Once upon a time, the brave warriors of the Fire Clan fought the dark lord Masakado and defeated him, saving the beautiful land of Jipang. Many years later, the followers of the Daimon Cult tried to resurrect Masakado, but were defeated by the thief Ziria and other descendants of the Fire Clan. Kabuki Danjūrō, a flamboyant kabuki performer who fought together with the great hero Manjimaru and helped him defeat the guardians of the Dark Orchids, receives a letter from Orochimaru, one of the heroes of the battle against the Daimon Cult. It seems that the followers of this evil organization have raised their ugly heads again. Several young women were kidnapped, and Orochimaru suspects it was the work of Daimon Cult. Being a perfect gentleman, Kabuki agrees to abandon his flourishing acting career for a while, rescue the girls, and confront the cult. The journey takes Kabuki across Jipang and, for the first time in the series, to an exaggerated, comedic version of London.

== Reception ==
Reception

Review scores
Publication	Score
Famitsu	9/10, 8/10, 9/10, 7/10
Gekkan PC Engine	95/100, 90/100, 95/100, 85/100, 90/100
Dengeki PC Engine	75/100, 70/100, 70/100
Hippon Super!	8/10

Tengai Makyō: Fū-un Kabuki-den was met with generally favorable reviews. It received a score of 25.1 out of 30 in a 1993 readers' poll conducted by PC Engine Fan.
