= Nobuyuki Inoue =

Japanese video game writer

- 井上 信行
- Occupations: Scenario writer; game director
- Employers: Square (1991–2000); Brownie Brown (2000-2012); Sayonaraoyasumi (2012–present)
- Works: Live a Live; Mother 3; Fantasy Life; Triangle Strategy

Nobuyuki Inoue (井上信行, Inoue Nobuyuki) is an independent writer at his own company, Sayonaraoyasumi. He previously worked as a creative director for Square and Brownie Brown. He entered the video game industry when he took a job with Square as a debugger on the Game Boy game Final Fantasy Legend II. He began working as a scenario designer on the Super Famicom game Live a Live. He was also involved in games in the Mana series, including Legend of Mana.

He left Square to work with Brownie Brown, a wholly owned subsidiary of Nintendo. He continued making games in the Mana series, starting with a remake of Final Fantasy Adventure titled Sword of Mana for the Game Boy Advance. He went on to direct a new franchise called Magical Vacation for the Game Boy Advance, which was followed by Magical Starsign for the Nintendo DS. He later directed Mother 3, the long-awaited sequel to EarthBound. His final work at Brownie Brown was as the lead planner on Fantasy Life for the Nintendo 3DS.

Inoue began Sayonaraoyasumi Co., Ltd. on April 2, 2012. Under this company, he worked as a scenario writer on Triangle Strategy for the Nintendo Switch.

== Works ==
Year	Game title	Role
1990	Final Fantasy Legend II	Debugger
1992	Romancing SaGa	Field map design
1992	Hanjuku Hero: Aa, Sekaiyo Hanjukunare...!	Battle director
1994	Live A Live	Battle director, scenario
1995	Romancing SaGa 3	Map design
1997	Final Fantasy Tactics	Planner
1999	Legend of Mana	Event planner
2001	Magical Vacation	Director, scenario
2006	Magical Starsign	Director, scenario
2006	Mother 3	Director
2011	Professor Layton's London Life	Director
2014	Fantasy Life	Lead planner
2021	Story of Seasons: Pioneers of Olive Town	Scenario writer (credited as Sayonaraoyasumi)
2022	Triangle Strategy	Scenario (credited as Sayonaraoyasumi)
