= Far East of Eden: Kabuki Klash =

1995 video game

- Developer: Racdym (Note: Additional work by Red Company)
- Publishers: SNK; Hudson Soft (Neo Geo CD)
- Director: Osamu Kimura
- Producer: Takafumi Horio
- Designers: Oyabun; Torajirō Tsujino
- Artists: A. Ono; H. Ando; M. Kusanagi
- Composers: Eisaku Nambu; Kennosuke Suemura; Masaaki Nishizawa
- Series: Tengai Makyo
- Platforms: Arcade, Neo Geo AES, Neo Geo CD
- Release: Arcade: JP: 20 June 1995; NA: 1995; Neo Geo AES: WW: 28 July 1995; Neo Geo CD: JP: 24 November 1995
- Genre: Fighting
- Modes: Single-player, multiplayer
- Arcade system: Neo Geo MVS

Far East of Eden: Kabuki Klash (Note: Also known as Devil's World Outside of Heaven - The True Legend (Japanese: 天外魔境真伝, Hepburn: Tengai Makyō Shin Den) in Japan.) is a fighting game developed by Racdym and published by Hudson Soft for arcades, Neo-Geo, and Neo Geo CD in 1995. It is a spin-off of the popular Japanese console RPG series Tengai Makyo. As of 2023, it is the only Tengai Makyo game to have been released outside Japan.

== Gameplay ==
Gameplay screenshot showcasing a match between Kabuki Danjuro and Yagumo

Far East of Eden: Kabuki Klash is a 2D fighting game, similar in play style to the Samurai Shodown series and The Last Blade series, but with the addition of various power-ups and very over-the-top anime-style special moves. Power-up icons appear on-screen at random, either springing out of the scenery or delivered by the Karasu Tengu. Characters wield weapons, which can be lost and recovered during battle.

== Story ==
Kabuki Klash is set within the land of Jipang (a reference of feudal Japan). The story follows warriors, often swordsmen, in battles against a range of often comical villains.

== Reception ==
Reception

Review scores
Publication	Score
AllGame	(Neo Geo) 3.5/5
GamePro	(Neo Geo) 16 / 20
Next Generation	(Neo Geo) 2/5
MAN!AC	(Neo Geo) 78%
Maximum	(Neo Geo CD) 4/5
Neo Geo Freak	(Arcade) 13 / 20
Player One	(Neo Geo CD) 82%
Super Game Power	(Neo Geo) 4.5 / 5.0
Superjuegos	(Neo Geo CD) 92 / 100
Video Games	(Neo Geo CD) 78%
VideoGames	(Neo Geo) 8 / 10

In Japan, Game Machine listed Far East of Eden: Kabuki Klash on their August 1, 1995 issue as being the sixth most-popular arcade game at the time. According to Famitsu, the AES version sold over 14,775 copies in its first week on the market. The game has been met with positive reception from critics since its release.

VideoGames reviewer Tyrone Rodriguez gave the game a score of 8 (Great), stating: "With its gimmicks and blinding visual style, Kabuki Klash is tremendously fun." The other editors' ratings were 8, 8 and 5. Reviewing the Neo Geo AES version, GamePro praised the advanced graphics and sound effects but criticized the uninteresting special moves and overpowered magic moves. They concluded, "The initial gameplay is arresting, but after a while, it loses its luster. Ultimately, the game doesn't offer more than the state-of-the-art animation and sounds we've come to expect from the Neo Geo." Next Generation criticized the game for having almost nothing to set it apart from the multitude of 2D fighting games already released for the Neo Geo AES, concluding his review with "And now for the standard Neo-Geo fighting game review ending: If you just can't get enough of that 2D fighting action, here's yet another one for you."

Reviewing the Neo Geo CD version, Maximum noted that Kabuki Klash is another one-on-one fighting game for a console already renowned as the preeminent fighting game console, but nonetheless applauded the game for its "fast and fluid" gameplay, "frankly awesome visuals", and original play mechanics.
