= A Kappa's Trail =

2009 video game

- Logo depicting various kappas
- Developer: Brownie Brown
- Publisher: Nintendo
- Designer: Shinichi Kameoka
- Platform: Nintendo DSi (DSiWare)
- Release: JP: December 9, 2009; NA: June 14, 2010
- Genres: Puzzle, action
- Mode: Single-player

A Kappa's Trail (かっぱ道, Kappa Michi; lit. Kappa's Road), is a puzzle-action video game developed by Brownie Brown and published by Nintendo for the Nintendo DSi's DSiWare digital download service. The game puts the player in control of a kappa, a mythological creature from Japanese folklore, using the console's touchscreen to create a path for it to follow through a level, with its goal being to escape the ocean and reach land.

Directed by Shinichi Kameoka, it was released in Japan in 2009 and North America in 2010. Following the DSiWare Store's discontinuation in 2017 and Nintendo 3DS digital storefront discontinuation in 2023, A Kappa's Trail and other DSiWare games became unavailable for purchase.

It has been generally positively received by critics, receiving praise for creativity. Critics begrudged that it could be too difficult at times, particularly due to requiring the use of a touchscreen for all controls, with multiple critics suggesting the console's d-pad be used to control the overhead camera. Following various announcements of digital storefront shutdowns, several works listed it among other games that are worth purchasing before this happens.

== Gameplay ==
A Kappa's Trail displays the map on the upper screen and the gameplay on the lower screen

A Kappa's Trail is a puzzle-action game that follows a kappa controlled by the player, whose goal is to escape the ocean in order to reach land. The player controls the kappa by drawing a path for it to follow on the console's touchscreen. The game starts with the kappa in an ocean hubworld, where the player can either play a selection of mini-games or do the main adventure. In the main adventure, the action is presented on the touchscreen of the Nintendo DS, while the upper screen displays a map. Along the way, various obstacles will be present that the player must remove, such as boulders, flames, and balloons. There are also collectibles, such as coins, which can be spent to purchase upgrades enhances the player-character. The player can also find various baby kappas which assist the player by either helping the kappa progress or provide coins and health. Upon traveling a certain distance into a level, a hand will begin to follow the path the player draws. If the kappa is stopped for too long, the hand will catch the kappa and force the player to start the level over. Each stage is won by reaching the end without being caught. The three mini-games include one where the player must guide the kappa across falling tiles, a visual memory quiz, and a survival game involving helping the kappa avoid the hand in an enclosed space. The game has various collectible objects for the player to acquire, including paintings and cassettes.

== Development and release ==
A Kappa's Trail was developed by Brownie Brown and directed by Shinichi Kameoka. It was published by Nintendo to the Nintendo DSi's DSiWare digital download service on December 9, 2009 in Japan and June 14, 2010 in North America. It has also been made available for purchase through Nintendo's Club Nintendo website for Platinum Coins, a currency exclusive to the website. It debuted 14th on the Japanese top 20 sales rankings for DSiWare games for the week ending December 16, 2009. As of March 27, 2023, sales of A Kappa's Trail and all other DSiWare games ceased upon the closure of the Nintendo 3DS' digital store, which hosted the DSiWare store that had been previously shutdown on the Nintendo DSi console on March 31, 2017.

== Reception ==
Reception

Review scores
Publication	Score
IGN	8.5/10
Nintendo Life	7/10

A Kappa's Trail has been generally well received. IGN writer Lucas M. Thomas felt that it, along with certain other DSiWare games, was chronically overlooked due to its platform. He considered the level of challenge to be just right, praising it for being "deep" and "quirky" while also finding that its use of the DS' touchscreen was inventive. Despite enjoying the challenge, he also felt that the opening levels could have been more well-balanced. He also believed that relying exclusively on touchscreen controls made the game chaotic at times, and that allowing camera movement to be controlled by the d-pad would have been an improvement. It was named the best DSiWare game of June 2010 by IGN staff. Andrew Wight of Nintendo Life felt that the difficulty in the early levels could prevent people from getting into the game, but also believed that players who could get past that would have a lot to enjoy with its "cute, colourful visuals, catchy soundtracks and fun, clever gameplay". Commenting on its difficulty, he believed that the use of the touchscreen for every function made it more challenging than it needed to be, agreeing with the idea of using d-pad to control the camera. Wight considered the price point to be a good deal, stating that the amount of content available would have made a higher price justifiable. It was recommended by Nintendo Power writer Phil Theobald, who stated that while the game would have been benefited from the camera being controlled by the d-pad, it was only a small flaw. He felt that the game was "full-featured", expressing surprise that a game as cheap as it was had so much quality content.

A Kappa's Trail has been recommended by multiple websites in response to the announcement of digital storefront closures. Following the announcement that the DSiWare store would shut down for Nintendo DSi users, Nintendo Force Magazine staff recommended its readers to buy it. The announcement that the Nintendo 3DS' digital storefront was going to go down resulted in Nintendo Life staff included A Kappa's Trail in a list of games to download before it becomes unavailable. They argued that its gameplay was creative, and that many of the ways it excels are areas many DSiWare games do not. The A.V. Club writer Marc Normandin included it in their similar list, stating that despite looking cute, it was "wildly difficult". He stated that while the player could upgrade the kappa with coins found in the level, the pursuit of these coins made the levels even more difficult.
