= Falling Stars (video game) =

2007 video game

- Microsoft Windows box art
- Developer: Ivolgamus
- Publishers: NA: Agetec; EU: Nordcurrent
- Platforms: Microsoft Windows, PlayStation 2
- Release: Microsoft Windows: EU: August 24, 2007; PlayStation 2: EU: August 24, 2007; NA: August 26, 2008
- Genre: Action role-playing video game
- Mode: Single-player

Falling Stars is a role-playing video game developed and published by Ivolgamus in Europe, and published by Agetec in North America. It was released on August 24, 2007 in Europe for Microsoft Windows and the PlayStation 2 and on August 26, 2008 in the United States for the PlayStation 2. The game is aimed at young children and was released with a price point lower than most PS2 games.

== Gameplay ==
In Falling Stars, players control Luna, a young girl who lives in the peaceful land of Dazzleon. Luna's uncle, Matt, discovers a curious mine and decides to take up residence in Dazzleon to investigate. The mine slowly takes over Matt's mind and he begins to perform evil experiments. Eventually, Matt turns on his pets, changing them all into evil monsters. Realizing her uncle's madness, Luna sets out to save him and prevent the world from suffering dire consequences.

=== Combat ===
Monsters are unleashed upon Dazzleon. The player cannot fight until they've obtained their pet, Komi. Battles require input to progress. When Komi's time bar fills, he can attack. When the monster's time bar fills, Komi can defend. The strength of the attack depends on the strength of the defense. If the two match, less damage is done. Monsters have attack patterns players can learn and use to compensate. For example, the Red Dog will begin his attack pattern with either Red (strong) or Yellow (fast). In either case (Red or Yellow), the pattern will follow as Yel, Red, Yel, Red, Yel, White. Since the Red Dog's pattern ends with White (mega), it's easy to tell when a new pattern is beginning. The player can heal Komi with magic or the more effective Health Potions when Luna's time bar fills. Luna's time bar can be rushed by rotating the RAS (right analog stick). Komi's stats can be boosted through equipped accessories, special items, and experience. Enough experience gains Komi bonus training points for use in Luna's home.

== Plot ==
=== Ending ===
At the end of the game, after beating Uncle Matt's spider, the spirit reveals itself, explaining that it had taken over Luna's body to prevent her from seeking out the ultimate power. It asks that Matt ensure Luna does not seek this power out and he promises to protect her.

== Characters ==
Some information about characters that appear in the game (with their Russian names):

- Lilou, or Luna - a young girl who's always there to help her friends. Her parents are dead and since their ruin, Lilou's uncle Shikoracks (Matt) is taking care of her.

- Shikoracks, or Matt - he was always interested in science, and he was ordering science magazines and new science tools. But after he'd found a curious mine, he changed into someone else - his skin colored in green and he lost his mind and no-one knows what will happen next with him.

- Bobo - he's a dwarf and he loves animals and hates everyone who hates them. As all dwarfs, Bobo can count money and he'll never miss a chance to earn some. But sometimes he makes a discounts for his friends.

- Artus - he's working on his boat station, giving his boats for lease. When he's not working, he likes to lay with his favorite smoothie and sunbathing.

- Thomash - an old military man. He loves kids and telling stories about his past, and if you don't stop him, his stories will last for hours. But also he knows some really great fighting methods.

- Isla - clever and beautiful girl. She's a little selfish but she loves making potions and medicine from everything - but they are too expensive.

- Olee - he's a science candidate. He hates magic and thinks that everything must be explained by scientific point of view. He can always help you with his inventions.

- Hoka - one more guy who likes science and dreams to be a scientist. But he's too boring and slow to start his career.

- Keira - laughing-out-loud girl with the worst memory in Lydonia (Dazzleon). She has a crush on Hoka, but it's her biggest secret.

== Reception and Criticism ==
Few official reviews for Falling Stars exist but those that do are critical of the gameplay. Criticisms include 'sterile combat' and 'flat characters'. The game currently holds a score of 32% on Metacritic, pooling reviews from 6 separate online sources.

Other critiques include frequent slow-loading screens, slow character movement/reaction, sprinting which requires stamina (a slow-refilling bar potions fill instantly), etc.

Positive notes would highlight the rare "dress-up" system featuring multiple character's opinions, the complexity of mini-games, conversations which begin automatically upon approach, the ability to play in six different languages, the opening movie being pretty if short, the lack of a "game over" and the battle mechanics being relatively interesting.
