= Enchanted Arms =

2006 video game

- North American cover art
- Developer: FromSoftware
- Publisher: Ubisoft: JP: FromSoftware
- Director: Masato Miyazaki
- Producer: Masanori Takeuchi
- Designers: Yoko Tsukamoto; Kazuhiro Hamatani; Rintaro Yamada
- Programmer: Takeshi Suzuki
- Artists: Keiichiro Ogawa; Daisuke Satake; Hiroaki Ueno
- Writers: Kazuhiro Hamatani; Masanori Takeuchi; Kaito Seta
- Composer: Yuki Ichiki
- Platforms: Xbox 360; PlayStation 3
- Release: Xbox 360: JP: January 12, 2006; NA: August 29, 2006; EU: September 8, 2006; AU: September 2006; PlayStation 3: JP: January 27, 2007; AU: March 22, 2007; EU: March 23, 2007; NA: April 3, 2007
- Genre: Role-playing
- Modes: Single-player, multiplayer

Enchanted Arms (Note: known in Japan as [eM] -eNCHANT arM- (エム エンチャント・アーム, Emu Enchanto Āmu)) is a 2006 role-playing video game developed by FromSoftware and published by Ubisoft. It was released for the Xbox 360 in 2006 and for the PlayStation 3 in 2007.

== Gameplay ==
Enchanted Arms is a role-playing video game which features turn-based combat where the player controls up to four characters in battle. Battles take place on a 6×4 grid divided into two 3×4 sections where both ranged and close combat attacks can be used. Player characters gain experience, level up, and acquire new skills and abilities.

== Plot ==
=== Characters ===
The protagonist of the game is Atsuma (アツマ), a student who is able to draw ether and enchantment power from others through his right arm to fight golems. Assisting him in his journey are Karin (カリン), a native of London City, a fighter who can use her legs to fight enemies and a member of a resistance movement; and Raigar (ライガ, Raiga), Karin's bodyguard and another member of the resistance movement. Also assisting him is Yuki (ユウキ, Yūki), a hunter who attacks Golems to earn expensive bounties by using her two guns.

=== Story ===
In Yokohama City, Atsuma studies to become an Enchanter along with his friends Makoto and Toya at Enchanter's University. When the trio skip class to attend a local festival, an earthquake occurs and the man-made golems in the area become berserk and attack citizens. After returning to university, they learn that the mysterious "sealed ward" had been opened. Seeking to discover the cause, the group encounter the Queen of Ice, a Devil Golem sealed long ago. With her immense Ether capability and regeneration power, she overpowers the three. When she captures Toya as ice falls on Makoto, Atsuma uses his right arm that turns into something out of the ordinary that could harm a Devil Golem to attack her, but is unsuccessful.

In London City, Atsuma learns that the Queen of Ice had frozen Yokohama. Escaping the dungeons with local resident Karin and her bodyguard Raigar, Atsuma discovers that the two are part of a resistance movement called the Arsenal, who opposes King Caliban's plans to revive the Emperor of Fire, another Devil Golem hidden right under the city. After returning to the university, they learn that Atsuma's professor, Kou, started the golem riot to awaken the power of his right arm, all for the Queen's revival and the restoration of Magic, the greatest technology in existence. Toya is now the Queen's Magicore, the power source and activation device of a Devil Golem. The Queen turns on Kou and destroys his laboratory, killing him.

Returning to London, Atsuma is recruited into the Arsenal and the golem hunter, Yuki, whom he encounters in Yokohama before the golem riot, joins him. After an attack from the London Knights, the arsenal suspects Raigar, a former knight and brother of Ooka, leading the attack. The others reveal that the Leader and his giggling companion are collaborators and give the Emperor of Fire's Magicore to Ooka. Ooka and Baron Hartson conspire to ruin the King's public image and personally revive the Emperor. Karin reveals she has to merge with the Emperor, for those who have ancient blood can activate and control Devil Golems to some extent. The Emperor fights with the Queen in the city before he is killed and consumed by Atsuma's right arm to save her.

The group leaves London for Kyoto after learning of a secret art taught there. The Queen orders Lord Tokimune, Shogun of Kyoto, to revive the Lord of Earth and thus, they could not enter the city until tomorrow. They stay in Iwato village and meet Sayaka, Raigar's fiancée. They learn that the secret art is taught by the Ascetic Monk, who lives in the Ascetic Court, which is accessible from the village but Tokimune has the key to get in. Though he refuses an alliance with London City, he allows them the key. Once they get it, Karin is kidnapped by a group of ninjas led by Oboro.

Rescuing Karin, the group confronts Tokimune, who was collecting Ether to revive the Lord of Earth. Despite being warned by Sayaka and Tokimune, Atsuma and the others defeat Sayaka and travel to the Ascetic Court. At the Ascetic Monk's request, the group obtains a portion of the Lord of Earth's core material to master the art of "Gaea". The village, however, is attacked by ninja, and confronts Tokimune. As they flee, Tokimune is killed by Oboro who learns the location of the Magicore: inside the Shogun; he is then killed by the Queen of Ice. They fight against the near-revived Lord of Earth, but when he transforms into his full form, Atsuma kills him by pulling him into his right arm.

After the Lord of Earth's Magicore is drained of Ether, the Queen of Ice invites the group to her ice castle north of Gravekeep Holm. Atsuma is sent into a mental vision where he retrieves a God orb, which was molded into a weapon for him. Raigar learns from his mentor, the Sage, that she used the cells of an unknown Devil Golem, Infinity, to rescue Atsuma after his parents left him as a child at the base of her tower. She also theorizes that inserting a Devil Golem can release a human to separate their Magicore. Atsuma, Karin, Raigar and Yuki defeat the Queen of Ice and save Toya; the mysterious man the group encounters several times reveals himself as Makoto soon afterwards. However, Atsuma has a vision and the disembodied entity then reveals itself as Infinity, who was ordered to reconstruct all matter in the world to the time of the Era of Magic. When Infinity tries possessing Atsuma, Toya and Makoto free him from Infinity's control. As Infinity begins to revive, Atsuma remembers the opposite word of Gaea, "Fury", and transforms into his half-golem form, combining everyone's enchanting to defeat Infinity. Yokohama is restored and the population returns.

== Release ==
Although the game was intended to be an Xbox 360 launch title for the Japanese market, its release date was pushed back. Ubisoft published the game in August 2006 in North America, and in September 2006 in the PAL region. At the time of its PS3 release, it was a launch title for the PAL market. Since its release, it has been confirmed that the game uses only a single DVD, in contrast to earlier multi-disc reports. It also comes with an art book and mini-calendar in Japan. The supplementary content included with the initial American product shipment was a 48-page prequel manga.

== Reception ==
Reception

Aggregate score
Aggregator	Score	
Aggregator	PS3	Xbox 360
Metacritic	64/100	69/100

Review scores
Publication	Score	
Publication	PS3	Xbox 360
Edge	N/A	6/10
Electronic Gaming Monthly	N/A	6.5/10
Eurogamer	N/A	7/10
Famitsu	N/A	29/40
Game Informer	N/A	6/10
GamePro	2.75/5	N/A
GameRevolution	N/A	C+
GameSpot	6.8/10	7.1/10
GameSpy	2/5	3.5/5
GameTrailers	N/A	7/10
GameZone	7/10	7.6/10
IGN	6.5/10	7.6/10
Official Xbox Magazine (US)	N/A	6.5/10
PlayStation: The Official Magazine	7/10	N/A
411Mania	N/A	6.5/10
The Sydney Morning Herald	N/A	2.5/5

The game received "mixed or average reviews" on both platforms according to the review aggregation website Metacritic. RPGFan reviewer Patrick Gann extolled the Xbox 360 version's visuals and gameplay, calling it "one of [his] favorite RPGs of the year." In Japan, Famitsu gave the same console version a score of one eight and three sevens for a total of 29 out of 40.
