= Hoshigami: Ruining Blue Earth =

2001 video game

- North American cover art
- Developer: MaxFive
- Publishers: NA: Atlus USA; JP: MaxFive
- Platform: PlayStation
- Release: NA: December 10, 2001; JP: February 7, 2002
- Genre: Tactical role-playing
- Mode: Single-player

Hoshigami: Ruining Blue Earth (Note: Japanese: Hoshigami ～沈みゆく蒼き大地～, Hepburn: Hoshigami: Shizumiyuku Aoki Daichi) is a tactical role-playing game (RPG) developed by MaxFive and published by Atlus USA in 2001, and by the former in Japan in 2002. The game was never released in Europe or Australia. A remake titled Hoshigami: Ruining Blue Earth Remix was released for the Nintendo DS in 2007 by Arc System Works.

== Story ==
=== Characters ===
- Fazz: A naive young man. He is a mercenary alongside Leimrey and is the main character of the story.
- Leimrey: A mercenary who uses a spear. He is a loner, but has been taken by Fazz as an older brother figure. Leimrey sees little reason for his fellow humans to exist.
- Tinn: Fazz's childhood friend and secret admirer. She was a spoiled child, and now expects to get her way.
- Elena: A mysterious woman Fazz meets on his journey.
- Reuperl: The leader of Nightweld's Royal Guards. He hires Fazz and Leimrey to fight Valaim.
- Alveen: A knight of the Valaimian Empire who fights to restore his family's name.
- Gomes: A former mercenary who managed to cut out Reuperl's eye. Now he's a merchant who lives with the Tuchi Tribe.
- Blackthorn: The commander of the Imperial Army that attacked Fazz's hometown. Emperor Fernandez knows nothing about Blackthorn's identity nor his ambitions. Even when he is defeated he is seemingly uninjured.
- Silphatos: A priest that has his own motives for joining Fazz. He knows a lot more about the history of Mardias than he lets on. The games best and secret ending reveal that he's actually the main antagonist of the game and is the final boss of said ending.
- Villa: The Priest of Earth serves as the personal adviser of Emperor Fernandez. His name matches one of the ancient Hoshigami.
- Fernandez: While he appears to be the absolute dictator of Valaim, most of his decisions are influenced by the Priest of Earth.
- Jacqueline: The leader of a bandit clan that resides in Gerauld. The bandits look up to her as a big sister, much to her chagrin, and she punishes them when they show their weakness to the enemy.

== Gameplay ==
The player must raise a small army of mercenaries by fighting turn-based tactical battles. Game flow involves selecting places on the world map, watching story characters interact, and then a battle. While on the story map, the player can equip items and teach party members skills, as well as train the party.

Battles take place on a square grid, complete with various terrain. Quicker characters can move first, and when the characters' turn is over, they can spend RAP points to control when they will go next.

=== Combat features ===
- Coinfeigm

Hoshigami features an extensive magic system that includes multiple classical elements including fire, wind, and ice. According to the mythology of the in-game universe, the power of the elements originally belonged to the many spirits of nature that lived in harmony with humans. Over time, however, the spirits' power was sealed into an ore called Manatite. As the ore is usually found in disk-like shards, people began to refer to them as "coins."

Throughout the plot, players can collect and use these coins in battle in the same way that magic is used in other games. Each coin has its own statistics, including how much power is stored in it and how much energy it takes to cast a spell. Coinfeigm can only be used if the coin has enough energy (CP) stored in it. The CP of a coin starts at the maximum at the start of each battle and replenishes itself as battle continues.

- Shoot System

This allows each character to push either an ally or enemy two squares in any direction.

- R.A.P System

A battle in Hoshigami featuring the battle queue that displays the flow of battle.

Each character is allowed to move, attack, use Coinfeigm or otherwise take action when their RAP Gauge reaches 0% and the turn begins; it fills with each action taken, and the character's turn ends when the gauge reaches 100%. When attacking with weapons, it is possible to "overfill" the bar, exceeding 100% and delaying the character's next turn; it is also possible to hasten the next turn by taking fewer actions than the gauge allows.

A queue appears at the top of the screen to let players know the flow of battle. Taking many actions will push a character to the end of the line, delaying the next turn. Once the player decides to end a character's turn, a separate RAP Gauge will come up in the middle of the screen. Players can choose to fill the gauge with extra RAP in order to affect when the character's next turn will fall. In this way, the player can plan ahead and form a strategy for defeating opponents.

- Session System

Characters can be left in "Session Mode" at the end of their turns, which makes them able to participate in Hoshigami's special attack system. If the currently-controlled character (the "Host" character) Shoots an enemy into an Ally who is in Session mode, that ally will damage the enemy upon collision and then Shoot them in whatever direction they (the ally) are facing. All six members of the party can participate in the Session if they have been properly positioned and left in Session mode.

=== Spirit Worship ===
All playable characters worship one of six principal gods that are the embodiment of the elements that make up the world. Character statistics change depending on which god is being worshipped at a given time, and each element focuses on a different aspect of combat.

=== Skills ===
During battle, characters who take action earn Devotion Points in addition to the usual experience points, and learn a new skill for every 100 Devotion Points. Learned skills differ based on which god the character is worshipping, and have many useful effects. The skills tied to each element include status-changing and status-augmenting moves, and more. A character could theoretically learn all the skills in the game, as there is nothing to stop a player from changing a character's god constantly.

== Reception ==
Reception

Aggregate score
Aggregator	Score
Metacritic	62/100

Review scores
Publication	Score
Electronic Gaming Monthly	6.5/10
Famitsu	29/40
Game Informer	7.25/10
GameSpot	7.1/10
IGN	4/10
Official U.S. PlayStation Magazine	2.5/5
PlayStation: The Official Magazine	8/10
RPGamer	1.5/5

Hoshigami received "mixed" reviews according to the review aggregation website Metacritic. In Japan, Famitsu gave it a score of 29 out of 40. Criticism was leveled at its steep learning curve and nigh-impossible battles, and the resulting emphasis on level-grinding. Character fatalities compound this problem: soldiers killed in battle are lost forever unless revived before battle's end, and can only be replaced by a newly-recruited, Level-1 party member, who may require hours of training before they are of equal level to their new teammates. The RAP, Session Attack and Coinfeigm mechanics received praise, but these innovations were not perceived as overcoming the game's faults.
