= Magical Starsign =

2006 video game

- North American box art
- Developer: Brownie Brown
- Publisher: Nintendo
- Director: Nobuyuki Inoue
- Producers: Shinichi Kameoka; Kensuke Tanabe
- Artists: Kouji Tsuda; Shinichi Kameoka
- Writer: Nobuyuki Inoue
- Composer: Tsukasa Masuko
- Platform: Nintendo DS
- Release: JP: June 22, 2006; NA: October 23, 2006; EU: February 9, 2007
- Genre: Role-playing
- Modes: Single-player, multiplayer

Magical Starsign, originally released in Japan as Magical Vacation: When the Five Stars Align, (Note: マジカルバケーション 5つの星がならぶとき, Majikaru Bakēshon Itsutsu no Hoshi ga Narabu Toki) is a role-playing video game for the Nintendo DS developed by Brownie Brown. It is the sequel to the Japan-exclusive Game Boy Advance title, Magical Vacation. It was released in Japan and the United States in 2006 and was released in Europe the next year.

== Gameplay ==
The player uses the Nintendo DS's touch screen for character control and interaction, while the top screen displays maps and other general information. Nearly all actions are controlled via the stylus; the only function of the buttons is to move the player character using the D-pad. The battle system is turn-based, and the position of the planets within the game affects the amount of damage wielded or received by each character. All characters in the game are associated with a specific planet, and their magic attack power is boosted when a character's planet is positioned favorably. Tapping an attacking character with accurate timing will increase their attack power, and similarly timed taps when they are being attacked by an enemy will reduce damage taken. In battle, party members are arranged in two rows, with back-row characters being unable to perform melee attacks in exchange for having their spells changed to affect multiple targets instead of just one. Their defense is also increased compared to front-row party members.

=== Astrolog ===
Gameplay of Magical Starsign during a turn-based battle on the fire planet Razen. It is daytime, and the Fire and Wind planets are aligned, powering up the characters associated with those elements.

There are 7 different elements in the game (light, darkness, fire, water, wood, earth, and wind) which each correspond to a planet in the game's planetary system. The Astrolog tracks the movement of these planets, which move clockwise around a central point as time passes within the game. The orbital velocity of each planet varies according to their size and location. Magic spells of certain elements are twice as effective while a planet is orbiting within the area assigned to its corresponding element. This bonus applies for both the player's magic spells and enemy spells. The light and dark elements are instead affected by solar activity: light magic is more powerful during the daytime, and dark magic is more powerful during the night (in-game time is viewable as an animated hourglass). A certain spell acquired later in the game allows the player to move the planets to an advantageous position; or potentially align the 5 planets in a straight line (as indicated in the Japanese version's subtitle), which causes far more damage than the standard elemental bonus. The planets may also happen to align without using the spell, but this causes damage to both the player and the enemy.

=== Multiplayer ===
Up to six players may connect locally (a game card is required for each player), taking their characters into a dungeon where they work together to defeat monsters while racing to collect treasure. Points are awarded for damage done to enemies and treasure collected from chests, and the player with the most points at the end wins the multiplayer mode. Experience points and treasures gained in this mode are applied to the main game.

Tag mode allows players to exchange game data to gain new items. Up to 100 players are recorded on the game's friend list, and the item gained will vary depending on in-game progress or the main character's element. There is also an option to create a short message displayed when tag mode is used, allowing players to exchange messages with each other. Using the tag mode frequently will create an "egg character", which becomes stronger each time tag mode is used successfully. The player can use the egg character in the main game, but it will not gain levels with experience like other characters.

== Synopsis ==
=== Setting and characters ===
Magical Starsign takes place in the fantasy world of the Baklava solar system, a planetary system composed of six planets that orbit a sun. The five closest planets to the sun each represent a different magical attribute, also known as a starsign, and host vastly different landscapes and civilizations: Razen (fire), Gren (wood), Puffoon (wind), Cassia (water), and Erd (earth). These five planets fall under the jurisdiction of King Suspiro, who is based in the city of Bena Rikashi on Puffoon. Bena Rikashi is also where the Baklava system's law enforcement agency, the Space Police, is headquartered. Within the sun exist two smaller planets: Nova (light) and Shadra (darkness). They reside in overlapping dimensions and frequently switch positions, which causes a day-night phenomenon throughout space.

The furthest planet from the sun, Kovomaka, is home to Kovomaka Kingdom and Will-o'-Wisp Academy, a school headed by Principal Biscotti where aspiring sorcerers are taught magic. However, due to its sheer distance from the other planets, most civilizations in the Baklava system have either never heard of Kovomaka or deny its existence.

The player controls six apprentice magicians in Magical Starsign: Lassi, a scatterbrained rabbit from an immigrant community who uses wind magic; Mokka, a deadpan robot purchased by Biscotti who uses earth magic; Chai, a salamander who uses wood magic, making him an oddity among salamanders who typically cannot evoke spells; Pico, a hot-blooded ōendan member who taught himself fire magic to support his family; Sorbet, the academy's top student from a poor household who uses water magic; and the player-named protagonist, who can be assigned either light or dark magic. They are all enrolled in Will-o'-Wisp's Class B, mentored by the capricious yet powerful sorceress Miss Madeleine. The primary antagonist of the game is Master Kale, an old student of Madeleine's who, leading a band of astro pirates, plots to destroy the Baklava system by fulfilling an apocalyptic prophecy.

=== Plot ===
The students overhear Principal Biscotti ordering Miss Madeleine to travel to Puffoon and confront Kale, whose pirates have been causing trouble across Baklava. Three months pass without contact from Madeleine, to which Lassi boards a rocket hidden in the academy's clocktower and sets out to find her. Lassi's classmates board the remaining rockets and get scattered across the Baklava system. The protagonist reunites with Lassi on Erd, teaming up to procure a new rocket capable of interplanetary travel. On their journey to find the other students, they make enemies with Kale's accomplice Chard and his pirates, who have taken Madeleine prisoner and sent her to Razen. They eventually discover that Madeleine, among many other magicians, was arrested by the Space Police. Upon reaching Razen, the group accidentally foil Sorbet's plan to save Madeleine by pretending to cooperate with Kale, who uses a spell to teleport his crew and the magicians he abducted into the sun.

Confirming that the pirates and Space Police are working together under Kale, the students set out to find the five millennium gummies, magical items that will let them enter the sun. Along the way, they learn from King Suspiro that Kale had once served under him in political affairs, until the populace revolted out of fear that their customs would be lost. Kale later discovered a grimoire authored by the late archmagician Craaken, who predicted that the universe would be reborn when a worm named Shadra devoured the sun and produced a new one. Deeming the populace incapable of maintaining the Baklava system, Kale resolved to hasten the apocalypse by nourishing Shadra with the magical power of magicians.

Landing on Nova inside the sun, the students set off for Shadra, the planet of darkness and the worm Shadra's namesake, in pursuit of Kale and his captives. They defeat Kale in the worm's den where Madeleine is trapped, and a battle ensues against a metamorphosed Shadra. Upon defeating it, the sun is enveloped in a light that stops the apocalypse. However, Madeleine passes away, hoping her students will learn from the friends they made on their journey. The group are then escorted by the Space Police, rectified by former general Knucklestorm and his daughter Brie Pourri, before returning to Will-o'-Wisp Academy.

In the game's epilogue, Pico drops out of Will-o'-Wisp in his eighth year to explore the galaxy, while Sorbet graduates with honors and enlists in the Space Police. Mokka allows Lassi to reassemble him into a prototype rocket, which she lends to the protagonist after detecting a signal in the far reaches of space, and Chai sneaks inside Mokka before takeoff.

== Reception ==
Reception

Aggregate score
Aggregator	Score
Metacritic	69/100

Review scores
Publication	Score
Electronic Gaming Monthly	6/10
Eurogamer	8/10
Famitsu	(DCA) 32/40; 31/40
Game Informer	6.5/10
GameRevolution	C+
GameSpot	7.3/10
IGN	7.5/10
Nintendo Power	7/10
Nintendo World Report	6/10
Pocket Gamer	4/5
RPGamer	3/5
RPGFan	83%
411Mania	8.4/10

Magical Starsign received "average" reviews according to the review aggregation website Metacritic. In Japan, Famitsu gave it a score of three eights and one seven, while Famitsu DS + Cube & Advance gave it all four eights.

Writing for Eurogamer, Rob Fahey said that it was "something which is well worth a look for any RPG fan who's in the market for a handheld adventure" and gave the game a score of 8 out of 10. GameRevolution called Magical Starsign a "solid old-school RPG" with good localization and audiovisuals, but disliked the limited number of spells, lack of innovative gameplay, and the overuse of stylus controls. GameSpot praised the humorous, wholesome script with a diverse cast of characters but thought the bland storyline, basic battle system, and high random encounter rate held the game back. Pocket Gamer similarly acknowledged the game's issues. Karl Castaneda wrote in a review for Nintendo World Report that the game was overall "forgettable", though the cutscenes were described as "pretty well done".
