= Aveyond =

Aveyond Series
- Genre: Role-playing video game
- Developer: Aveyond Studios
- Publisher: Aveyond Studios
- Creator: Amanda Fitch
- Platforms: Windows, Linux, macOS
- First release: Ahriman's Prophecy; March 7, 2004
- Latest release: Aveyond - Shadow of the Mist; December 10, 2015

Aveyond is a role-playing video game series by Aveyond Studios (formerly Amaranth Games or Aveyond Kingdom). It is set in a fantasy medieval world in which players attempt to save the world from evil beings, with a number of side quests available. There are eight games thus far in the series: the first two full games, the four "chapter" releases of the third game, the full fourth game, and the free prequel, Ahriman's Prophecy. All the games in the series were made with RPG Maker XP; Amaranth Games was the first developer to popularize RPG Maker as a commercial tool in 2006. Several of the games were subsequently released for Linux and Mac, along with Windows.

== Ahriman's Prophecy ==
Ahriman's Prophecy is a freeware role-playing video game released in 2004, and is the prequel of the series. Borrowing elements from Dragon Warrior and the earlier Final Fantasy games for its gameplay, it offers an experience similar to Japanese role-playing games. Unlike the other titles in the Aveyond series, Ahriman's Prophecy was not developed with RPG Maker XP and instead was created with RPG Maker 2003.

Ahriman's Prophecy starts as a young girl, Talia Maurva, is sent to partake in her village’s naming ritual, where a seer in the woods determines the careers of emerging adults. Talia looks into the seer's pool and sees the younger prince of Candar and his dark priest begin resurrecting the legendary warlock emperor, Ahriman. The seer, sensing that Talia is different, sends her to a school of magic in the mainland city of Thais. Talia’s friend Devin Perry agrees to escort her to the mainland. After she completes her training three years later, Talia is summoned into a dream by her headmaster and a high priestess of the Dreamland. They instructed her to warn an order of priestesses across the mainland that Ahriman is being resurrected and that it must be stopped before the thirteenth moon. Confused and disoriented, Talia nevertheless sets out on her journey to end the ritual and thus save the world from Ahriman.

=== Reception ===
Ahriman's Prophecy was received well by the gaming community. Edward Zuk of Game Tunnel opined that "while Ahriman's Prophecy adds little that is new to the RPG genre, it's a pleasing mix of familiar elements." Download.com's editor's review stated "we found the game's twee period music a guilty pleasure that reminded us of our last visit to Ye Olde Renaissance Faire. And considering the game's free, you get a heck of a lot of adventuring for your money," awarding it a score of 4/5.

== Aveyond: Rhen's Quest ==
The sequel to Ahriman's Prophecy, this game features a different map from its prequel except for two islands. The game has a wealth of quests, characters and endings, and has been considered to be "funny, innovative and wildly imaginative".

=== Plot ===
Devin Perry and Alicia Pendragon from Ahriman's Prophecy eventually married, as well as Talia and an unnamed Sun Priest. Sixteen years prior to Aveyond 1: Rhen's Quest, the forces of the demon Ahriman destroyed and sunk most of the surrounding areas and isles around Thais. This was because Alicia Pendragon, queen of Thais, was foretold to give birth to a child who would defeat a great demon and save the city if she reached adulthood. It was the foretelling of this birth that Ahriman wanted Thais destroyed. Tailor Darzon, a young but trusted general of Thais, offered to take the child to a safe place and raise her where the demon would not find her. As Thais and the queen fell, Tailor fled the kingdom with the child and escaped across the ocean to the Western Isle. He almost did not make it, but Talia Maurva, the Druid of Dreams, saved their lives. Tailor settled in the small mountain village of Clearwater.

When the game starts, the protagonist, Rhen, gets teleported to a part of the Dreamland. A priestess, barely alive after the daeva Agas attacked her, asks Rhen to bring her back through the portal to Clearwater. Rhen's many questions were only partially answered by the stranger. The priestess, Talia, gives Rhen her ring and tells her to keep it close, and that it will protect her. Unfortunately, before she knew more, a case of mistaken identity causes Rhen, instead of the priestess, to be kidnapped by a slave trader and she was sold to a family residing on the Eastern Isle, an ocean away from Clearwater. This slave trader was employed by Ahriman as part of a scheme with the sun priest Dameon Maurva, Talia's son. A long and bitter family history prompts Dameon to forsake his duty as the Druid of Light to serve Ahriman, as his father, the previous Druid of Light, had. When they found out about the slave trader's mistake, Ahriman had the Dark Seer, Indra, read Rhen's part in the apocalypse. He learns then that Rhen is destined to destroy him, but he can't kill her or he will also be destroyed. So, he sends his minions to find her and turn her to his side, as Indra proclaimed. Meanwhile, Rhen is found to have a great aptitude for sword magic when she defends a child from the bullying of her master's son. She is released from slavery and sent to the eastern capital city to learn the art of sword singing. After she was raised to an apprentice however, she reunites with the priestess, who was actually Talia, who tells her that she must reunite all eight druids of the world so that an artifact of great importance could be revealed, and that it was her destiny to finally vanquish Ahriman once and for all. Along her journey, Rhen will discover secrets about her past and will have to make decisions that will determine the direction of her future as well as the fate of the world.

=== Soundtrack ===
The game's soundtrack was written and recorded by Aaron Walz. The score features many recorded symphonic instruments, a rare feature for an independent game. The soundtrack won Game Tunnel's Game of the Year: Sound award for 2006.

=== Reception ===
Independent gaming website Game Tunnel awarded Aveyond their Game of the Month and Gold Award in March 2006. On the other side, Game Chronicles reviewer Jason Porter highlighted awkward key mapping (which cannot be remapped) and criticized the main character's personalities, dialogues and evolution throughout the game.

Reviews
Publication	Response
Gamezebo	3.5/5
RPGFan	83%

=== Platforms ===
Initially Windows-only, the game was released for Linux in June 2016 and subsequently for Mac.

== Aveyond 2: Ean's Quest ==
Ean's Quest is a sequel to Ahriman's Prophecy and Aveyond. It includes a few returning characters from the previous games. Aaron Walz returned to produce the soundtrack to Aveyond 2.

=== Plot ===
Ean (a male changeling) and Iya (a female song mage) are two young elves who live in a far away place called the Vale. One day, Ean wakes up to find that Iya, his best friend, has gone missing. Furthermore, none of the people of Vale remember who she is. Thus, Ean sets out on a quest to find his missing friend. On his quest, Ean will find that dear Iya has been swept away by the Snow Queen (who last appeared in Aveyond I: Rhen's Quest). Ean must save his friend, and Iya must learn to control her wild powers that the Snow Queen desires for herself. They must fight to stop the Snow Queen's plot to cover the world in ice.

=== Reception ===
Aveyond 2 received generally positive reviews by the gaming community. Erin Bell of Gamezebo said "it's a great example of a 'casual' role-playing game that delivers a delightful and accessible fantasy adventure." Neal Chandran from RPGFan said "Aveyond 2 represents another wonderful independently developed RPG and is another feather in the cap of Amaranth Games" and that though it does not revolutionize the Aveyond series in any way, it "adds another immersive entry to this solid series." Aveyond 2 was second runner-up in the 2007 Game Tunnel Game of the Year: Player's Choice Award and RPG of the Year Award.

Reviews
Publication	Response
Gamezebo	4/5
RPGFan	85%

=== Platforms ===
The game is available for Windows, Linux and Mac.

== Aveyond 3: Orbs of Magic ==
Aveyond 3 is divided into four chapters that are downloaded individually with a save game to be transferred from one game to the next. The games can also be played as a stand-alone, but that is not recommended as it lacks several key features. Orbs of Magic centers on Mel, a thief who steals a powerful heirloom. Unbeknownst to her, Mel is a descendant of Mordred Darkthrop, an evil sorcerer who plotted to rule the world, and only a Darkthrop can remove the Orbs of Magic from their resting place. Accidentally handing the Orb of Darkness over to a megalomaniac vampire lord, she now has to run for her life and find a way to stop him from using the orb and destroying the light from the surface world.

=== Chapter 1: The Lord of Twilight ===
==== Plot ====
Chapter 1 was released on June 5, 2009. Mel, a thief who dwells in the town of Harburg, is introduced as the protagonist in this chapter. She is hired by an unknown man to steal an heirloom of great importance. Later, the man is revealed to be Gyendal, the chief antagonist, a vampire lord wanting to plunge the world into darkness. She is rescued by Te'ijal Ravenfoot, also a vampire and Gyendal's sister, who refers her to the academy in Thais. Mel begins her training there as a spy.

As it is evident she can hide no longer, she sets out on a journey to the land of Naylith, where lie the answers to the puzzles. On her journey, Mel meets a prince, Edward, Stella, a gentle girl of mysterious origin and two classic characters from the first Aveyond, the Vampiress Te'ijal and her husband Galahad.

=== Chapter 2: Gates of Night ===
==== Plot ====
Chapter 2 is a direct continuation of Chapter 1, and all items and spells are carried over.

Two more people join the party: Lydia, seen in Lord of Twilight, a powerful fighter with magical spells, and Ulf, an orcish scholar who you rescue from the orcish prison.

The game continues the party's plot to find the way to Naylith and use the Orb of Light to save the world from Gyendal. This plan was thwarted shortly after finding the orb when Stella smashed it to the ground.

The party realizes that Stella is under a spell cast by Gyendal, which compels her to do his bidding. They travel to Aveyond to seek guidance from The Oracle, who tells them that Mordred Darkthrop created a third orb known as the Orb of Life. The party decides to search for this orb in the Underworld.

After finding the orb, Mel and Stella attempt to activate it. Gyendal interrupts them and a battle ensues. After the party defeats Gyendal, Mel takes the orb from its pedestal, and Stella activates it with her magic. Stella is killed in the process, and the orb's power causes Te’ijal, Galahad and Gyendal to become human.

The party finds Gyendal unconscious and takes Stella and him to the castle in Thais. The chancellor places a bracelet on Gyendal that prevents him from using magic, and the guards take him to the castle dungeon for imprisonment.

=== Chapter 3: The Lost Orb ===
==== Plot ====
This game is not a direct continuation of the previous. All items are removed, as are several of the characters because they considered the quest to have ended in Gates of Night. This chapter was released on February 15, 2010.

There are three new party members: June, a spell trickster, Yvette, a familiar, and Spook, a thief with a dark secret.

At the beginning of the game, Mel reveals that the Orb of Life was used to revive Stella.

What should have been the most romantic day in Mel's life (if Edward proposed to her) turns into a nightmare when Lydia transformed into the bride to trick Edward into marrying her. Having nothing left for her in Thais, Mel sets out to find the Orb of Death (the fourth and final lost orb) to prevent it from being used to fulfill the Darkthrop prophecy.

=== Chapter 4: The Darkthrop Prophecy ===
==== Plot ====
This final game in the series was released on December 21, 2010. Mel has been living in Harakauna for the past year after discovering that she can use magic. She is found by the darklings that now know that she is the prophesied one. Before they can take her, she is rescued by Edward and two scholars from the Arishta Isles (a land that hasn't been seen in the Aveyond series since Rhen's Quest). They offer her magical training at their academy, but she only agrees to go if Edward will train with her. After begrudgingly enrolling in Shadwood Academy in Veldarah, she learns to love her magic and the sense of freedom it gives her.

While returning to campus from an assignment, a group of monsters attack the school. Mel and Edward successfully aid the guards and teachers in fighting the monsters.

After saving Shadwood Academy from the attack, Mel and Edward return to their dorms. As Mel approaches her dorm room, she sees the words “Darkthrop Prophecy” written on the wall and realizes that the monsters were there for her. She returns to the lobby and tells the headmaster and her teachers, but they do not believe her. She once again returns to her dorms and finds a note written anonymously. The note instructs her to meet its writer in a lone cabin in the woods, and Mel leaves town the next day.

When she arrives at the cabin, she discovers it's a trap set by Gyendal, the former vampire lord. Gyendal reveals that he kidnapped and bound Stella, and tells Mel that he will kill her if Mel refuses to accompany him. Stella begs Mel to not agree to his demands. Mel nonetheless agrees to follow him to Underfall in exchange for Stella's release.

Stella heads to Veldarah and finds Edward at Shadwood Academy. After she tells Edward what happened to Mel, the pair set out to save her.

This game differs from the others in that there are two different parties, Mel's and Stella's. Players swap between them, but they never meet and merge. Players therefore have two completely different inventories.

The four chapters for the game are available for Windows, Linux and Mac.

== Aveyond 4: Shadow of the Mist ==
Released on December 10, 2015, after five years of hiatus. The main character of this game is Boyle, a renounced villain who once set out to rule the world, but was defeated and forced to live in a small town. After series of mishaps, he now has to take up the path of a hero and try to save the world.

=== Plot ===
The main character, Boyle, resides in a town for retired villains, along with others like him. Ingrid, a witch in the town, has cursed him to marry her. In a series of events that lead him to losing his dog, he must now set out to save his beloved animal by carrying out the heroic task of saving the son of the Mist Queen. On the way, he comes across numerous characters with vividly different personalities who join him on his epic quest.

=== Platforms ===
The game is available for Windows, Linux and Mac.
