= Sword of Vermilion =

1989 video game

- European box art
- Developer: Sega AM2
- Publisher: Sega
- Director: Hiroshi Hamagaki
- Producer: Yu Suzuki
- Designers: Hiroshi Hamagaki; Keiji Okayasu; Tomoharu Kimura
- Programmer: Tomoharu Kimura
- Writer: Keiji Okayasu
- Composers: Hiroshi Kawaguchi; Yasuhiro Takagi
- Platform: Mega Drive/Genesis
- Release: JP: December 16, 1989; NA: November 10, 1990; EU: 1990
- Genre: Action role-playing
- Mode: Single-player

Sword of Vermilion (Note: Known in Japan as Vermilion (Japanese: ヴァーミリオン, Hepburn: Vāmirion)) is a 1989 action role-playing game developed and published by Sega for the Sega Genesis. The player controls an unnamed prince character as they attempt to save the realm of Vermilion by collecting a series of rings through navigating the overworld, dungeons, and battles against enemies and bosses.

Sword of Vermilion is the first console exclusive game developed by Sega's AM2 division.

Sword of Vermilion is part of the Sega Genesis Collection for the PlayStation 2 and PlayStation Portable, and was available on the Wii's Virtual Console. In December 2021, it was added to the Nintendo Classics service.

== Plot ==
King Erik V and King Tsarkon were close friends who sought the 8 rings of good and evil to bring peace and balance to the realm. However, the rings of evil changed King Tsarkon and he led his army from his kingdom of Cartahena to invade Excalabria. The defenders were overwhelmed and the castle of King Erik collapsed. Erik summoned his bravest, strongest and most faithful knight, Blade, to entrust him his infant son with an ancient family heirloom, the Ring of Wisdom. King Erik ordered Blade to save himself and the prince before perishing while the castle burned. The remaining rings of good were scattered throughout the realm by King Tsarkon to deter anyone from uniting the rings. King Tsarkon turned the infant prince's mother to living stone and vowed all of Cartahena's power to finding the boy.

Blade traveled to a small village named Wyclif, where he settled down and raised the child as his own son. Eighteen years later, the prince begins his quest upon learning his true destiny and origins upon Blade's death bed.

== Gameplay ==
The four different gameplay styles (From top to bottom, left to right): exploring towns; navigating the overworld; battling enemies; and fighting bosses

Sword of Vermilion is a fantasy action role-playing game which uses various different gameplay styles. There are four types of gameplay and depending on the context of what the player is doing or where they are in the world, the gameplay changes to reflect that. In most circumstances, the player controls the prince from a top-down perspective but A side-on perspective is used for boss fights. Much of the game is spent fighting or exploring.

In battle situations, which occur when encountering an enemy in the overworld or while in dungeons, the prince can attack using a sword or magic spells. The prince can obtain more powerful swords and magic in towns by talking to non-player characters within shops.

== Release ==
During its initial launch period in North America, Sword of Vermilion was the main role-playing game highlighted during the Genesis does what Nintendon't ad campaign.

Sword of Vermilion was one of the last Sega Mega Drive/Genesis role-playing games to come with a hint book.

== Reception ==
Contemporary Reviews

Review scores
Publication	Score
Computer and Video Games	91%
Electronic Gaming Monthly	7/10, 8/10, 7/10, 6/10
Digital Press	9 / 10
Joystick	88%
Mega	86%
MegaTech	93% 87%
Player One	94%
Sega Power	95%

=== Contemporary ===
Upon release, Sword of Vermilion received positive reception.

Computer and Video Games said it was an "excellent" and "highly compelling arcade/adventure RPG" offering "a vast, sprawling adventure". They praised the "arcade format" action combat system as "great fun" and "an improvement over" Phantasy Star II's turn-based combat system, found the story to be "engaging and easy to follow" with "intriguing plots and subplots", and considered the music and sound effects "amongst the best" on the Mega Drive. However, they criticized the "decidedly rough" graphics of the "3D screens" but praised the "excellent town graphics" and "detailed sprites."

MegaTech magazine said it was "probably the best RPG on the Mega Drive. A gripping plot combined with user-friendly controls and great presentation". In 1992, Mega placed the game at #11 on their list of top Mega Drive games of all time.

Retrospective Reviews

Review score
Publication	Score
IGN	5.5/10

=== Retrospective ===
In critical retrospect, Sword of Vermilion has received mixed reception.

Lucas Thomas, reviewing for IGN, criticized the gameplay calling it repetitious and formulaic, stating that the various play styles were underdeveloped and held together like "a patchwork quilt".
