= Tengai Makyō =

- Genre: Role-playing
- Developers: Red Company; Hudson Soft
- Publisher: Hudson Soft
- Creator: Oji Hiroi

Tengai Makyō (Note: Japanese: 天外魔境, Hepburn: Tengai Makyō; lit. "The Realm of Demons Outside Heaven"), also known as Far East of Eden, is a series of role-playing video games released in Japan and Taiwan. The series was conceived by Oji Hiroi and developed by Red Company, debuting on the PC Engine CD-ROM² System in 1989.

The series became popular in Japan, where it was one of the most popular RPG series during the 16-bit era, along with Enix's Dragon Quest and Squaresoft's Final Fantasy. Its success was partly because the original Tengai Makyō was the first RPG released for the new CD-ROM format, which it utilized to create a bigger game and introduce fully voiced animated cut scenes and CD music to the genre.

The series grew to encompass a number of remakes, gaidens and genre spin-offs across a variety of platforms. Despite selling over 2.2 million copies in Japan, the series is largely unknown in other territories, with only one game released overseas.

== Overview ==
The main series is composed of three separate games within the land of 'Jipang' (a fictional feudal Japan using the name given by Italian merchant Marco Polo), each follows a descendant of the 'Fire Clan' and supporting cast in battles against a range of often comical villains. The stories of the games, though primarily of 'fantasy' fare, are inspired by and a parody of misconceptions about Japanese culture by Western societies.

The first game Tengai Makyō: Ziria (1989), released for the PC Engine CD-ROM² system, was notable as the first RPG released on CD-ROM and the first in the genre to feature animated cut scenes and voice acting. The plot and characters were inspired by the Japanese folk tale Jiraiya Goketsu Monogatari (with the protagonist's name deliberately misspelled, per the fantastic theme). The music for the game was also composed by the Academy Award winning musician Ryuichi Sakamoto. The game was previewed in the November 1990 issue of Computer Gaming World. The writer Roe R. Adams (also a co-developer for the Wizardry games) described it as "a truly gigantic game" that "seems to be about the size of 2 or 3 Ultimas put together." He suggested that, if "NEC can handle the mammoth translating job, Ziria could be the game hit of 1991" unless, "of course, Nintendo counters with Zelda III or Dragon Warrior III, and Sega with Phantasy Star III."

The sequel Tengai Makyō II: Manjimaru (1992) was reportedly the most expensive game ever made up until that time; the game's lead programmer Hiromasa Iwasaki later revealed the development budget was about ¥500 million ($4 million at the time, or $9.2 million adjusted for inflation), making it possibly the first AAA game production on CD-ROM. The music was composed by Joe Hisaishi, known for composing soundtracks to Studio Ghibli's anime films such as Castle in the Sky (1986), Princess Mononoke (1997) and Spirited Away (2001). There were plans to release Tengai Makyō II in North America, but due to the TurboGrafx-16's failure in that market, no Tengai Makyō games would be released there up until Far East of Eden: Kabuki Klash (1995).

== Creators ==
The games are largely the creation of Oji Hiroi and Red Company (today Red Entertainment). Virtually all publishing tasks have been handled by Hudson Soft.

The series is purported to be based on a book entitled "Far East of Eden" written by a Paul Hieronymus Chada (typically written as P.H. Chada), who is presented as a 19th-century Smithsonian professor of oriental studies. The book and P.H. Chada do not exist, and 'P.H. Chada' is actually derived from 'Prince (Oji) Hiroi'. This is part of how the setting is supposed based on the misconceptions Western societies held with regard to Japan in the past. The person "Hiroshi Adachi" credited as creating the series is also fictional, with the roles he is credited for actually being performed by Hiroi. "Adachi"/"Chada" also had a personal website which was actually run by Hiroi.

Oji Hiroi and Red Company would later become known for creating the Sakura Wars series for the Sega Saturn. Sakura Wars adopted various elements from the series, including a pre-modern Japanese setting and the use of animated cutscenes and voice acting.

== Games ==
Entries in the franchise have been released for several different console and mobile platforms, including remakes for newer systems, such as the PSP compilation Tengai Makyō Collection, which contains the main four PC Engine titles.

Year	Title	Genre	Original Platform
1989	Tengai Makyō: Ziria	RPG	PC Engine CD
1992	Tengai Makyō II: Manji Maru	RPG	PC Engine CD
1993	Tengai Makyō: Fuun Kabukiden	RPG	PC Engine CD
1994	Tengai Makyō: Deden no Den (promo)	Maze	PC Engine CD
1995	Tengai Makyō: Kabuki Ittou Ryoudan	Fighting	PC Engine CD
1995	Far East of Eden: Kabuki Klash	Fighting	NeoGeo
1995	Tengai Makyō: Dennou Karakuri Kakutouden	FMV fighting	PC-FX
1995	Tengai Makyō Zero	RPG	Super Famicom
1997	Tengai Makyō: Daiyon no Mokushiroku	RPG	Sega Saturn
2003	Oriental Blue: Ao no Tengai	RPG	Game Boy Advance
2003	Tengai Makyō II: Manji Maru (remake)	RPG	GameCube, PlayStation 2
2004	Tengai Makyō Mobile	RPG	iPhone
2005	Tengai Makyō III: Namida	RPG	PlayStation 2
2006	Tengai Makyō Ziria Harukanaru Jipang	RPG	Xbox 360

=== Canceled games ===
- Oriental Blue (Nintendo 64 DD)
- Tengai Makyō: Jipang Seven (browser-based game)

== Other media ==
A two-episode OVA titled Tengai Makyō Ziria Oboro-hen (Note: 天外魔境 自来也おぼろ変) was made in 1990.

Tengai Makyō was also included in the two volumes of the 1992 manga anthology Hudson Makyō (Note: ハドソン魔境) by Minori Shobo, which featured stories about different Hudson franchises.

Tengai Makyō II protagonist Manjimaru Sengoku appears as a playable character in the 2003 crossover fighting game DreamMix TV World Fighters.
