= UniStar =

U.S. nuclear subsidiary of Électricité de France

UniStar Nuclear Energy is a wholly owned subsidiary of EDF (Électricité de France), formed in 2007 to develop new nuclear energy facilities in the United States.

UniStar has one project under development, Calvert Cliffs Unit 3 in Maryland - the reference plant for the Areva, U.S. EPR design. The Nuclear Regulatory Commission is currently reviewing UniStar's Combined License (COL) application for this facility. UniStar is also assisting PPL Corporation with the development of their Bell Bend Unit 1 project, which is also a U.S. EPR design.

Created in 2005 by Constellation Energy and Areva, UniStar Nuclear became UniStar Nuclear Energy in August 2007 - a joint venture by Constellation Energy and EDF. In 2010, EDF acquired 100 percent of UniStar Nuclear Energy.

In 2008, UniStar also submitted a Combined Operating License Application for a new nuclear unit in Oswego NY, to be named Nine Mile Point Unit 3. UniStar failed to acquire the land rights from Constellation Energy (and other parties) and subsequently terminated the NMP3 project in 2013.

In February 2014, after significant staff reductions the prior year, UniStar vacated its Baltimore MD office and moved remaining staff to the EDF North America Headquarters in Chevy Chase MD.

UniStar continues to pursue a COL for the Calvert Cliffs Unit 3 project, however continued delays by AREVA to obtain the U.S. NRC approval of the U.S. EPR design (i.e. Design Certification) have delayed the project.
