= Bahamut Senki =

1991 video game

- Developer: Sega
- Publisher: Sega
- Platforms: Sega Mega Drive; Virtual Console
- Release: Mega Drive: JP: March 8, 1991; Virtual Console: JP: April 24, 2007
- Genre: Tactical role-playing
- Modes: Single-player, multiplayer

Bahamut Senki (バハムート戦記; lit. "War Chronicles of Bahamut") is a tactical role-playing game developed by Sega for the Sega Mega Drive in 1991. It was only released in Japan.

The game offers a unique soundtrack for each of the many playable "races" in the game, and has various levels of gameplay that ranged from arcade Archon-style creature-on-creature combat to strategy similar to Koei's strategy games like Gemfire and Nobunaga's Ambition. Two-player games are also an option, given the variety that the game offered with the occasional arcade action battle to break up the quiet strategy and planning.
