= Magical Vacation =

2001 video game

- Developer: Brownie Brown
- Publisher: Nintendo
- Director: Nobuyuki Inoue
- Producers: Shinichi Kameoka; Takashi Kawaguchi; Shigeru Miyamoto; Kenji Miki
- Artists: Shinichi Kameoka; Kouji Tsuda
- Writer: Nobuyuki Inoue
- Composer: Tsukasa Masuko
- Platform: Game Boy Advance
- Release: JP: December 7, 2001
- Genre: Role-playing video game
- Modes: Single-player, multiplayer

Magical Vacation (Note: Japanese: マジカルバケーション, Hepburn: Majikaru Bakēshon) is a 2001 role-playing video game developed by Brownie Brown and published by Nintendo for the Game Boy Advance only in Japan on December 7, 2001, and was later re-released in the same region in 2006. Japanese singer, model, and actress Mika Nakashima was featured in the television commercials for Magical Vacation.

A sequel was produced for the Nintendo DS in 2006, titled Magical Vacation: Itsutsu no Hoshi ga Narabu Toki. It was released in North America and Europe as Magical Starsign. Magical Vacation was later re-released for the Nintendo Classics service in 2025.

== Gameplay ==
The game is an RPG adventure game, where the player interacts with the overworld to progress the story while battling against enemies in a turn-based battle system. There are 16 different elements in the game. The relationships among these elements are rather complex.

=== Spirit combos ===
The player can increase the power of attacks by borrowing power from elemental spirits in a process called Seirei Combo (精霊コンボ; spirit combo). To use a spirit combo, the player must summon an elemental spirit, and use magic of the same element in the following turns to release vast amounts of damage. Attack power is doubled per spirit present, meaning 2 spirits would create 4 times as much damage, and 3 spirits would create 8 times as much. The maximum combo (7 spirits) yields 128 times as much damage. Certain special rules apply to its use: for instance, the enemy can summon spirits of a stronger element to eliminate the combo's effectiveness (having one fire elemental spirit will eliminate the effect of one wind elemental spirit), and spirits can be extracted from the field using certain spells. The combo also applies for bombs which contain the magic power of an element. The maximum number of spirits that can be summoned is 7 (regardless of how many spirits were present at the start of the battle), and spirits must be re-summoned per combo use.

=== Amigo system ===
Screenshot of the turn-based battle system

This system allows the player to interact with the Game Boy Advance's multiplayer link. The first option, Let's Amigo (レッツアミーゴ), allows players to exchange main characters to acquire new spells. For instance, exchanging between a wind elemental main character and a sound elemental one will allow the wind elemental character to learn a sound elemental spell, and vice versa. Magic learned in this way can be strengthened with experience like all other spells from the beginning of the game. Each player can also receive "special" spell data, which can be equipped to allied characters, but equipped spells will not strengthen with experience. Exchanging a certain number of times will give the main character a new spell or change their element. Love magic is acquired if the player exchanges with 5 players of the same element. Exchanging 100 times will change the main character's element to the dark element and change their appearance to the dark costume. Learning all of the spells in the game and fulfilling the two prior requirements will give the main character light magic, change their element to the light element, and change them into the light costume.

The second option, Let's Onsen (レッツおんせん; let's go to the hot springs) becomes available if the player has gone to the hot spring in the Plane of Light at least once during the game. Using the other player's hot spring will increase the main character's powers (different types of hot springs improve different status points; using the same hot spring repeatedly decreases the probability of powering up). After a certain number of uses, the player may be offered a choice to upgrade their hot spring. The level of upgrade is dependent on the player's rank, which is influenced by their in-game actions and win/loss ratio in battles.

The third option, Let's Taisen (レッツたいせん; let's battle), is the multiplayer battle mode. A multiplayer battle is conducted in the same way as regular battles in the story mode, but winning a certain number of battles or maintaining a certain winning percentage awards the main character a special title that boosts their abilities. 3 elemental spirits (chosen randomly) also appear at the beginning of every multiplayer turn.

Nintendo organized two events in 2002 to gather Magical Vacation players together to make the Amigo system more accessible. The first event was held on January 26 in Osaka, and the second event was held the following day in Tokyo. These events allowed players who only had access to one game cartridge to quickly gain power-ups for their characters.

== Setting ==
=== Plot ===
Once upon a time, war erupted for three days in the magic kingdom Kovomaka. This war was kept a secret from ordinary citizens, but one man began to travel all around the country in preparation for the next battle, and several years later, the game's main character entered the magic school Will-o'-Wisp at the invitation of the school's principal.

The students of Will-o'-Wisp Academy are sent away to a summer school called Valencia Beach. At nighttime, strange monsters called the enigma appear on the beach, abducting the students and sending them to another world. The hero must find the missing students, while also uncovering the mysteries of the enigma and the war that occurred in the kingdom.

=== Setting ===
The game is set on four main planes. They are the Plane of Material, the Plane of Light, the Plane of Darkness, and the Plane of Death. The Plane of Material includes Will-o'-Wisp Academy and Valencia Beach. The Plane of Light includes Mimolette Forest, Benakoncha Ruins, and Rēmittsu Palace. The Plane of Darkness includes Riginio Jungle, Enigma Forest, and Morbier Volcano. The Plane of Death includes Gazpacho Village, the Pyramid, and the Hall of Rebirth. Players move through these planes in the story.

=== Characters ===
==== Will-o'-Wisp classmates ====
Hero/Heroine (Human, age 14)

The player's character has no default name, and the player may choose the character's gender and element as well. The protagonist is a student who travels with his classmates from a magic school. The character cannot start out with the light, dark, or love elements, but can learn spells of other elements or change elements using the Amigo system. The main character's appearance changes when they acquire the light or dark elements.

Kirsche Pintail (キルシュ・ピンテール; Human, age 15, male, Fire element)
Kirsche likes sports. Kirsche likes sports. He has been friends with Arancia Scorenote since childhood. He is obsessed with Candy Mintblue, and his magic can obtain gummy worms from MP recovery pots.

Arancia Scorenote (アランシア・スコアノート; Human, age 15, female, Sound element)
Arancia is a gifted musician who can play a multitude of musical instruments. Her natural talent comes from her musical family, and she can master any instrument almost instantly, but her music seems to lack emotion and expression, and often causes listeners to lose interest and doze off. She is less than thrilled about Kirsche's affection for Candy Mintblue. Her magic allows the player to discover gold or silver coins from chests.

Ganache Nighthawk (ガナッシュ・ナイトホーク; Human, age 15, male, Dark element)
Ganache is a cool and withdrawn student who was born into a family that bears the dark element. He believes that he and his sister, Vanilla, are different from others, and begins to pursue the enigma after his sister's disappearance three years ago (he explains that his intention was to merge with the enigma in order to save his sister). He prefers to be alone, and only associates with users of dark magic. His hobby is playing the harmonica near the river, and his dark magic makes him a powerful character in battle. His feelings towards Candy Mintblue begin to shift as the story progresses.

Cassis Lumberyard (カシス・ランバーヤード; Human, age 16, male, Blade element)
Cassis is a nihilistic boy who seems to have underground connections. He lost his father at a young age, but is unaware of the cause of his death. His hobby is collecting knives, and he is a proficient cook. He continuously courts his classmate, Blueberry Lakeside, but is rejected every time. His magic allows the player to retain gummy frogs even when a blade spirit joins.

Cidre Rainbow (シードル・レインボウ; Human, age 14, male, Beauty element)
Cidre is an artist and art critic whose precocious talent allowed him to open his own exhibition at age 10, but he has recently lacked a theme that he can be passionate enough to depict. He acts as a tutor to his cousin, Souffle, and his magic prevents birds from blocking the player's path. As the story progresses, it is revealed that his mother met a dark fate.

Blueberry Lakeside (ブルーベリー・レイクサイド; Human, age 15, female, Water element)
Blueberry is a calm girl who comes from an aristocratic family in the service of the king, with ancestry tied to the Plane of Water. She is continuously at the top of her class, but her frail body prevents her from strenuous activities. She is best friends with Lemon Airsupply, who saved her from bullies during childhood. She seems unsure how to react to Cassis Lumberyard's affection. Her magic allows her to translate "aquarim", the language of the water people.

Lemon Airsupply (レモン・エアサプライ; Nyamnelt, age 16, female, Thunder element)
Lemon is an active, boyish girl who hails from a family of martial artists, but an accident during childhood prevented her from joining the rest of the family, so she began training at Will-o'-Wisp Academy. She cannot bear to watch bullying, and is fond of Blueberry Lakeside. Her magic prevents piranhas from extorting money from the player.

Olive Tearclown (オリーブ・ティアクラウン; Human, age 11, female, Beast element)
Olive is a shy, gentle girl who likes animals. She had the ability to read minds from youth, but a certain event caused her to fear looking into people's minds. She thinks of Ganache Nighthawk as a brother, and her ability to read minds allows her to understand him better than the other students. Her magic prevents monsters from jumping out of gummy worm holes.

Cabernet Cheaptrick (カベルネ・チープトリック; Puppet, age 13, male, Poison element)
Cabernet is a mischievous and pessimistic boy who was taught magic by a frog. The frog lives in Cabernet's head, and prevents him from picking up gummy frogs. He used to bully Blueberry Lakeside, but stopped after being reprimanded by Lemon Airsupply. He has knowledge of the hidden past between his deceased older brother, Chardonnay, and Ganache's sister, Vanilla. His magic makes gummy frogs run away, but also allows the player to reach paths blocks by the gummies.

Pistachio Maplewood (ピスタチオ・メイプルウッド; Wolks, age 12, male, Wood element)
Pistachio is a kind but cowardly boy who is one of the least skilled magic users at Will-o'-Wisp. His grades are terrible, and he is bordering on failing. He wears a pair of pants on his head instead of a hat, and likes to read manga. His magic lets him pick up extra gummy frogs when drinking from HP pots.

Peche Farmer (ぺシュ・ファーマー; Love ambassador, age 15, female, Love element)
Peche is a diligent and emotional girl who loves to look after others. Her personality fits the mold of class president. Her magic sometimes retrieves coins from gummy worm holes.

Sesame Ashpot (セサミ・アッシュポット; Human, age 10, male, Bug element)
Sesame loves bugs. He always keeps bugs in his pocket, and is rather introverted and timid. He looks up to Kirsche Pintail, and likes to follow him around. His magic warns the player if chests house monsters instead of items.

Café au Lait Rustynail (カフェオレ・ラスティネイル; Ancient robot, age 12,000, male, Ancient element)
Café au Lait is a robot that the Will-o'-Wisp Academy principal bought for cheap at an antique store. His machinery is quite rare and valuable, but he is disassembled and operated on several times throughout the course of the game. Café au Lait's personality is designed to be cool and nihilistic, and a character very similar to Café au Lait makes an appearance in the game's sequel as well. His magic helps motivate dwarves scattered around the world, which unlocks the secret dungeon.

Chocolat Cracks (ショコラ・クラックス; Mudman, age unknown, male, Stone element)
Chocolat was buried in the ground near the school for a long time before being dug up one day by the students. He talks like a small child, and likes to play with small animals. His magic allows the player to find gummy worms hidden underneath rocks.

Candy Mintblue (キャンディ・ミントブルー; Human, age 13, female, Wind element)
Candy is a talkative, active girl who is attracted to Ganache Nighthawk. Her affection for Ganache plays a strong role in her actions during the later parts of the game. Though she exhibits a carefree personality, she actually despises herself for lacking courage. She rivals Blueberry Lakeside in school smarts, and her hobby is collecting handkerchiefs. She is utterly oblivious of Kirsche Pintail's infatuation with her. Her magic allows the player to remove bomb pots without using a gummy frog.

Other important characters from the Will-o'-Wisp magic school include the main character's teacher, Miss Madeleine (マドレーヌ先生), who seems to be an ordinary teacher but is actually a powerful magician. The school's principal, Gran Dragée (グラン・ドラジェ) (called Biscotti in the sequel) is a legendary magician who gathered the magic school students together from all around the kingdom after the war. Balsamic (バルサミコ) is the driver of the Mabasu (魔バス; magic bus), which can take the player into different areas of the map. Vanilla Nighthawk (ヴァニラ・ナイトホーク) is Ganache's older sister, who disappeared after merging with an enigma in her mad search for power. She is held captive in Chiboust Castle. Chardonnay Cheaptrick (シャルドネ・チープトリック) is Cabernet's older brother, who was a soldier in the Kovomaka army. He died while searching for Vanilla a year before the start of the story.

== Reception ==
Reception

Review scores
Publication	Score
Famitsu	9/10, 9/10, 8/10, 9/10
Portable Review	42 of 50

On release, Famitsu the two reviewers found the game very user-friendly and suggested it to new comers of the series. Two reviewers found the only downside to be that the controls take time to get used to and one reviewer saying the screen looks a bit dark on the Game Boy Advance. One reviewer said that knowing you could lose a hard-earned level ranking or important item made it exciting and that completing a dungeon that had previously bested the player gives a sense of accomplishment not found in other role-playing games.

The game was the second highest rated Game Boy Advance game from 2001 from Famitsu, only being beaten by Game Boy Advance release of Torneko: The Last Hope.
