= Hoshigami: Ruining Blue Earth Remix =

2007 video game

Hoshigami Remix
- North American box art
- Developers: Barnhouse Effect; Arc System Works
- Publishers: JP: ASNetworks; NA: Aksys Games; EU: 505 Games
- Composers: Saori Kobayashi; Kennosuke Suemura; Mai Iida; Ikuko Mimori
- Series: Hoshigami
- Platform: Nintendo DS
- Release: JP: May 24, 2007; NA: June 25, 2007; EU: October 19, 2007
- Genre: SRPG
- Mode: Single-player

Hoshigami: Ruining Blue Earth Remix, also known as simply Hoshigami Remix, is a strategy RPG video game, for the Nintendo DS and is a remake of Hoshigami: Ruining Blue Earth (originally released by Atlus USA) for the Sony PlayStation. The game was developed by Arc System Works and was released in Japan in May 2007 by ASNetworks and in North America in June 2007 by Aksys Games. The developed programmer is Barnhouse Effect, and characters are designed by Arc System Works.

== Plot ==
A war between the Kingdoms of Valaim and Nightweld has begun on the continent of Mardias. Fazz, the leader of a band of mercenaries (and the main character) is hired to protect one of the Ruins of Ixia from the Valamian army. Meanwhile, an evil being rises from the shadows and threatens to destroy Mardias.

=== Characters ===
- Fazz: A naive young man. He is a mercenary alongside Leimrey and is the main character of the story.
- Leimrey: A mercenary who uses a spear. He is a loner, but has been taken by Fazz as an older brother figure. Leimrey sees little reason for his fellow humans to exist.
- Tinn: Fazz's childhood friend and secret admirer. She was a spoiled child, and now expects to get her way.
- Elena: A mysterious woman Fazz meets on his journey.
- Reuperl: The leader of Nightweld's Royal Guards. He hires Fazz and Leimrey to fight Valaim.
- Alveen: A knight of the Valaimian Empire who fights to restore his family's name.
- Gomes: A former mercenary who managed to cut out Reuperl's eye. Now he's a merchant who lives with the Tuchi Tribe.
- Blackthorn: The commander of the Imperial Army that attacked Fazz's hometown. Emperor Fernandez knows nothing about Blackthorn's identity nor his ambitions. Even when he is defeated he is seemingly uninjured.
- Silphatos: A priest that has his own motives for joining Fazz. He knows a lot more about the history of Mardias than he lets on.
- Villa: The Priest of Earth serves as the personal adviser of Emperor Fernandez. His name matches one of the ancient Hoshigami.
- Fernandez: While he appears to be the absolute dictator of Valaim, most of his decisions are influenced by the Priest of Earth.
- Jacqueline: The leader of a bandit clan that resides in Gerauld. The bandits look up to her as a big sister, much to her chagrin, and she punishes them when they show their weakness to the enemy.

== Gameplay ==
This re-release of Hoshigami featured several additions to make it better suited to handheld gameplay, as well as to make it more accessible to new gamers, most notably with a selectable difficulty setting. Among these features were a new localization of the dialogue, new endings, and the requisite stylus control, which, combined with the dual screens, made for a slightly easier menu-surfing experience. A new character was added to this release, and the DS’ wireless features were used for an item-trading mode.

- Shoot System

This allows each character to push either an ally or enemy two squares in any direction.

- RAP System

Each time a character performs an action, the gauge will increase until it reaches 100%. While it is possible to attack more than once per turn, doing so uses up more of a character's RAP points, delaying their next turn. It is possible for the gauge to exceed 100%, and this will delay the character's next turn.

- Session System

The "host character" (that performs Shoot) can deploy several party members to perform one devastating attack. In order to do this, the host must be placed next to an enemy and produce a Shoot attack into another playable character. Doing this will make the enemy shoot again in the direction that the second character is facing, increasing the damage done. If there is a third character placed one square away from the second that happens to be facing in a different direction, the enemy will be "shot" from the first, through the second, and out of the third, doing even more damage. If the player's characters are placed correctly, an enemy can be "shot" up to six times.

In order to initiate a Session, the non-host characters must be put into Session Mode at the end of their turns.

There are six main religions in Hoshigami Remix. Each religion determines a character's stat growth, weapon proficiency, and which skills they can learn.

There are also two secret religions, which can be unlocked by learning various skills from the other religions.

== Reception ==
Reception

Aggregate score
Aggregator	Score
Metacritic	55/100

Review scores
Publication	Score
1Up.com	C
Famitsu	25/40
GamePro	2.5/5
GameSpot	5/10
GameZone	6.8/10
Hardcore Gamer	3.25/5
IGN	6/10
NGamer	47%
Nintendo Power	6/10

The game received "mixed" reviews according to the review aggregation website Metacritic. IGN said, "It can be difficult, complicated, and relatively uninspired when it comes to the overall out-of-battle experience." GameSpot said, "Hoshigami is an overcooked hodgepodge that's too unwieldy for strategy RPG newcomers and too imbalanced for experts." In Japan, Famitsu gave it a score of two sixes, one seven, and one six for a total of 25 out of 40.
