= Tengai Makyō: Ziria =

1989 video game

Tengai Makyou: Ziria
- PC Engine cover art
- Developers: Hudson Soft, Red Company
- Publisher: Hudson Soft
- Designer: Shōji Masuda
- Composers: Ryuichi Sakamoto; Tomotsune Maeno
- Series: Tengai Makyo
- Platforms: PC Engine CD-ROM², mobile phones, Xbox 360, PlayStation Network
- Release: PC Engine: JP: 1989-06-30; JP: 2010-10-20 (PSN); Cellphone: JP: 2004; JP: 2005; JP: 2006; Xbox 360: JP: March 23, 2006
- Genre: Role-playing
- Mode: Single-player

Tengai Makyō: Ziria (天外魔境 ZIRIA), also known as Far East of Eden: Ziria, is a 1989 role-playing video game co-developed by Hudson Soft and Red Company and published by Hudson Soft for the PC Engine CD-ROM². It is the first game in the Tengai Makyo (Far East of Eden) series, and follows a plot based on the legend of Jiraiya. The game was popular in Japan because its release on the CD-ROM format, which made it a large game for its time filled with voiced cutscenes and CD audio music.

== Gameplay ==
Tengai Makyou: Ziria is a 1989 role-playing game.

== Development ==
Tengai Makyou: Ziria was co-developed by Hudson Soft and Red Company.

== Release ==
The game was re-released for Japanese cellphones in the 2000s.

An Xbox 360 remake Tengai Makyou: Ziria – Haruka naru Jipang (天外魔境 ZIRIA～遥かなるジパング～; lit. "Far East of Eden Ziria: Tales from Distant Jipang") was released in 2006. Gaijinworks was working on an English localization of the remake at some point, but had to cancel the project due to being unable to get past Microsoft's publishing minimums.

In 2023, an English-language fan translation of the game was released.

== Reception ==
The game received a positive review from PC Engine Fan magazine, which rated it 25.67 out of 30.
