= Tengai Makyō II: Manji Maru =

1992 video game

- PC Engine cover art
- Developer: Red Company
- Publisher: Hudson Soft
- Director: Shōji Masuda
- Producer: Takeshi Takebe
- Designers: Shōji Masuda; Oji Hiroi
- Programmer: Hiromasa Iwasaki
- Writers: Shōji Masuda; Oji Hiroi
- Composers: Joe Hisaishi; Yasuhiko Fukuda
- Series: Tengai Makyō
- Platforms: PC Engine Super CD-ROM², GameCube, PlayStation 2, Nintendo DS, PlayStation Network (PCE CD version, for the PS3 and PSP)
- Release: March 26, 1992: PC Engine Super CD-ROM²; JP: March 26, 1992 GameCube; JP: September 25, 2003 PlayStation 2; JP: October 2, 2003 Nintendo DS; JP: March 9, 2006 PlayStation Network; JP: March 17, 2011
- Genre: Role-playing
- Modes: Single-player, multiplayer

Tengai Makyō II: Manji Maru (天外魔境II卍丸, lit. "The Devil's Cave Outside Heaven: Manji Maru"), also known as Far East of Eden II: Manji Maru, is a 1992 role-playing video game developed by Red Company and published by Hudson Soft for the PC Engine Super CD-ROM². It is the second game in the Tengai Makyō series.

It was reportedly the most expensive video game developed up until that time. Upon release, it received critical acclaim and became Japan's best-selling PC Engine game of all time as of 1993. It was remade in 2003 by Hudson for the GameCube and PlayStation 2, and a version was released for the Nintendo DS in 2006. All versions of the game were released only in Japan.

== Story ==
The setting starts in a beautiful country named Jipang where the Fire clan and Roots clan have been rivals over centuries since the dawn of time, good versus evil. The home town of Manjimaru Sengoku, a descendant of the Fire clan, is attacked by the Roots clan. He begins a long journey to save the world. Along the way he will meet Danjūrō Kabuki, Tarō Gokuraku and Kinu to help him in his quest.

=== Characters ===
- Manjimaru Sengoku (戦国卍丸 Sengoku Manjimaru): A playful kid that runs around his village with the other kids to discover new adventures around his hometown. It was not until the Roots clan army invades his village that his mother finally tells him the heroic past of about his father. His father was one of the legendary 7 swordsman of the Fire clan whom defeated the previous era of Roots clan's domination. And now it is his turn to become a heroic man like his father and save the world from the Roots clan once again.
- Danjūrō Kabuki (カブキ団十郎 Kabuki Danjūrō): A loud mouthed, goofy, bit narcissistic, ladies' man Japanese kabuki performer who would add a touch of "color" to Manjimaru's journey. Kabuki is an excellent swordsman who carries a pair of traditional Japanese swords.
- Tarō Gokuraku (極楽太郎 Gokuraku Tarō): A fire breathing joyful giant with a huge appetize. Gokuraku is over a thousand year old, and was living in Mermaid clan's captivity till Manjimaru comes along.
- Kinu (絹): An innocent quiet girl with a tragic past. Kinu is actually half demon that is in fear of the great power within her and what she is capable of. She asked Manjimaru to bring her a special magic seal wrist chains before she joins him on his journey. Kinu travels with a huge white fluffy dog named Shiro who has been with her since she was a kid, her only friend as a child.

== Development ==
Tengai Makyō II was developed by a team of over 100 people led by Oji Hiroi. He mentioned the concept of "a grand multi-level story with 50+ endings" but said it cannot be realized with existing technology, so he preferred to write a story where the plot "flows smoothly and naturally."

Tengai Makyō II, previewed in a 1992 issue of TurboPlay magazine as Ziria: Far East of Eden 2, was reportedly the most expensive game ever made up until that time. The game world consists of over 20,000 screens of overworld maps. The game also features 300 types of enemies, 48 different boss characters, more than 90 minutes of cutscene animation, three hours of voiced speech, 24 CD music tracks, and over 80 PSG chiptune music tracks. The music was composed by Joe Hisaishi, known for composing soundtracks to Studio Ghibli's anime films such as Castle in the Sky (1986), Princess Mononoke (1997) and Spirited Away (2001). In 2015, Tengai Makyō II lead programmer Hiromasa Iwasaki revealed the game's development budget was about ¥500 million ($4 million at the time, or $9.2 million adjusted for inflation), making it possibly the first AAA game production on CD-ROM.

== Reception ==
Reception

Review scores
Publication	Score
Famitsu	32 / 40
PC Engine Fan	27.92 / 30

Award
Publication	Award
PC Engine Fan	Best Game of All Time, Best Music & Sound Effects, Best Playability, Best Difficulty, Best Originality, Best Value

The game entered the weekly Famitsu charts at number three in early April 1992, remaining in the top 20 up until June and in the top 30 up until July 1992. It went on to become Japan's best-selling PC Engine game of all time, as of 1993. The later PlayStation 2 and GameCube versions released in 2003 sold 197,010 copies in Japan.

The game received critical acclaim upon release. It was rated 27.92 out of 30 by PC Engine Fan magazine, higher than its predecessor. This made Tengai Makyō II the magazine's highest-rated game of all time as of 1992, and they awarded it for Best Game of All Time, Best Music & Sound Effects, Best Playability, Best Difficulty, and Best Value. Famicom Tsūshin (Famitsu) magazine's "cross review" panel, in April 1992, gave it scores of 9, 6, 9 and 8 out of 10, for a total of 32 out of 40. While Tengai Makyō II was never published outside Japan, Victor Ireland, president of Working Designs (an American publisher which had localized a number of other RPGs for the PC Engine CD-ROM), ranked it number 1 on his personal list of the greatest games of all time. In a 2006 poll, readers of Famitsu magazine voted it their 12th favorite video game of all time.
