= 1-Up Studio =

Japanese video game developer

1-Up Studio Inc.
- Logo used since 2013

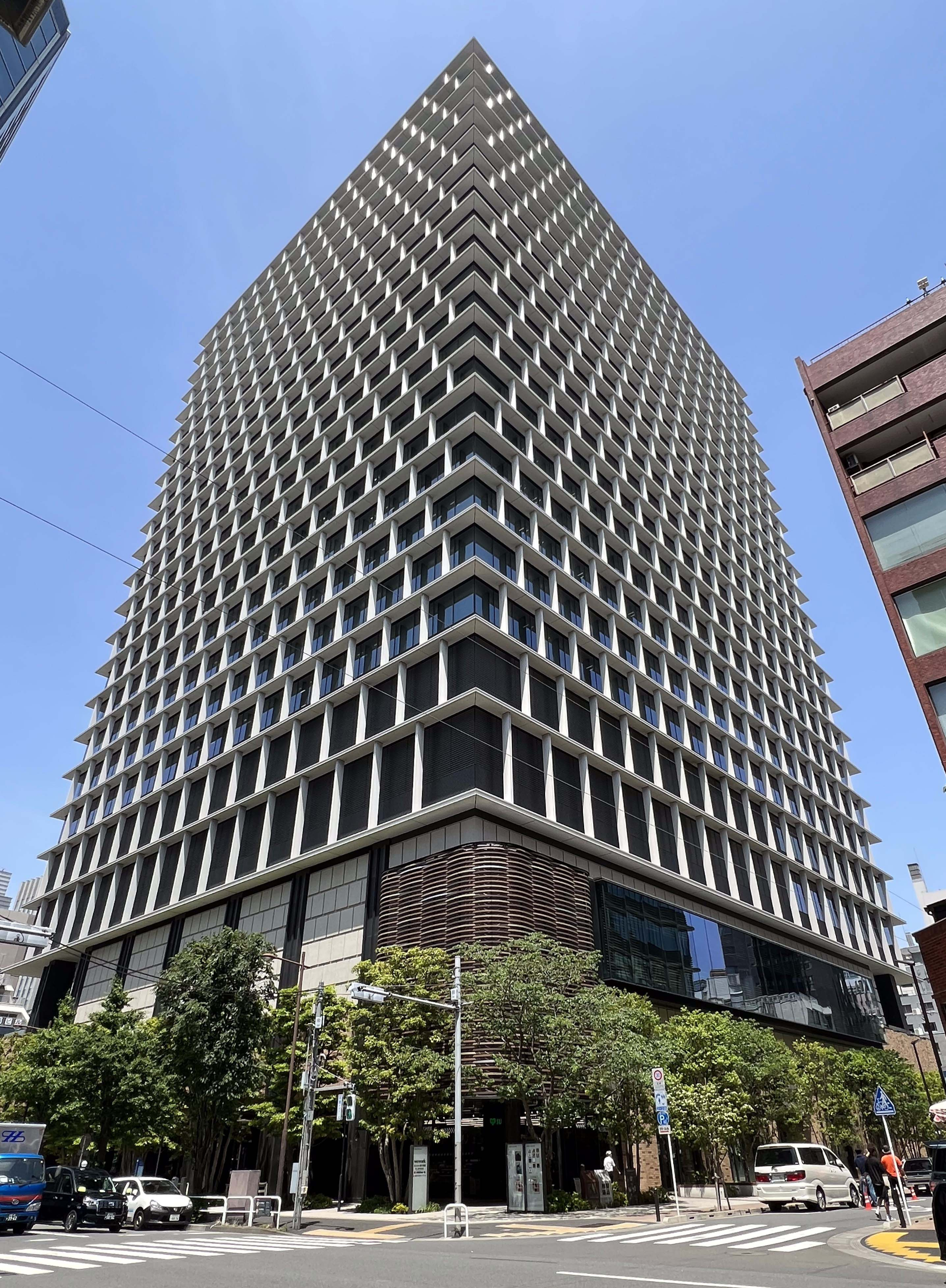
- Headquarters in Chiyoda, Tokyo
- Native name: 1-UPスタジオ株式会社
- Romanized name: 1-Up Sutajio Kabushiki gaisha
- Formerly: Brownie Brown Inc. (2000–2013)
- Type: Subsidiary
- Industry: Video games
- Founded: June 30, 2000; 26 years ago in Tokyo, Japan
- Founder: Shinichi Kameoka; Kouji Tsuda
- Headquarters: Kanda Square, 2-2-1 Kandanishiki-cho, Chiyoda, Tokyo, Japan
- Key people: Gen Kadoi (President)
- Number of employees: 102 (2026)
- Parent: Nintendo
- Website: 1-up-studio.jp

1-Up Studio Inc. (Note: Japanese: 1-UPスタジオ株式会社, Hepburn: Wan-Appu Sutajio Kabushiki gaisha) (stylized as "1-UP STUDIO"), formerly Brownie Brown Inc., (Note: Japanese: 株式会社ブラウニー・ブラウン, Hepburn: Kabushiki gaisha Buraunī Buraun) is a Japanese video game developer based in Tokyo. It was founded on June 30, 2000 by Square alumni Shinichi Kameoka and Kouji Tsuda, who worked on the Mana series. The studio developed games for both Nintendo and Square Enix, including Magical Vacation and Sword of Mana.

On February 1, 2013, the company announced that due to their recent co-development efforts with Nintendo, they were undergoing a change in internal structure. As a result, the company took on its current name. At the same time, Kameoka left to form a new studio, Brownies.

Since the 2010s, the company has mainly worked as a support studio to Nintendo EPD, with its staff mainly consisting of artists, game designers, and programmers.

== History ==
Logo as Brownie Brown

1-Up was founded on June 30, 2000 as Brownie Brown, and consisted of many 2D artists formerly of Square. Founders Shinichi Kameoka and Kouji Tsuda had previously worked on the Mana series on the Game Boy and Super NES platforms. They left Square due to "differing ideals." The studio's name came from the Brownies, fairies of Scottish folklore said to be hardworking and friendly, which Kameoka believed fit the team's style (a Brownie is featured in the studio's logo). He elaborated that he wanted to make Game Boy Advance games, leading to the creation of Brownie Brown.

The company's first original creation was the Japan-only Magical Vacation for the Game Boy Advance, which was released in 2001. Another popular title developed by Brownie Brown was Sword of Mana, which was created for and published by Square Enix. Thought to be a new title in the Seiken Densetsu series, it was actually an enhanced remake of the first game in the series, Seiken Densetsu: Final Fantasy Gaiden (known as Mystic Quest in Europe and Final Fantasy Adventure in North America).

The company has also been credited with the development of Mother 3 in a collaborative effort with Shigesato Itoi and HAL Laboratory for the Game Boy Advance, and Magical Starsign (Magical Vacation: When the Five Stars Align in Japan) for the Nintendo DS. Brownie Brown expressed interest in a Nintendo DS port of Mother 3 if Nintendo asked them to make it, and that they would like it to be enjoyed by fans abroad.

While the company only developed games for Nintendo's handheld consoles up to this point, the company had previously announced a title for the GameCube, named Gofuku, which was scheduled for release in 2005 and announced alongside Magical Starsign.

The company later released Blue Dragon Plus for the Nintendo DS, developed alongside Mistwalker, and entered into the downloadable games market in 2009 with A Kappa's Trail, a DSiWare game. Brownie Brown also worked on the DS title Livly Garden, based on a browser game from So-net Entertainment, released in Japan on January 28, 2010, and aided in the development of two Level-5 titles, Professor Layton's London Life, a bonus game included with Professor Layton and the Last Specter, and Fantasy Life, for the DS and 3DS respectively.

On February 1, 2013, the company announced on their original official website that, as a result of their recent development cooperation efforts with Nintendo, Brownie Brown had undergone changes in internal structure, which included officially changing its name to 1-Up Studio and becoming a support studio for Nintendo. Upon the changes, Kameoka left 1-Up Studio to found Brownies, seeking to make original games. In the same year, Yoshiaki Koizumi became part of the board of directors of the company as one of its directors.

In 2020, the company moved its headquarters to the new Nintendo Tokyo Office building at Kanda Square, Tokyo with Nintendo EPD Tokyo, Nintendo PTD Tokyo, HAL Laboratory Head Office and Tokyo R&D Center, and Game Freak.

== Games developed or co-developed ==
=== As Brownie Brown ===
Year	Title	Platform(s)	Publisher	Role
2001	Magical Vacation	Game Boy Advance	Nintendo	Lead developer
2003	Sword of Mana (Note: Co-developed with Square Enix)	Game Boy Advance	Square Enix	Lead developer
2006	Mother 3 (Note: Co-developed with HAL Laboratory)	Game Boy Advance	Nintendo	Lead developer
2006	Magical Starsign	Nintendo DS	Nintendo	Lead developer
2007	Heroes of Mana	Nintendo DS	Square Enix	Lead developer
2008	Blue Dragon Plus	Nintendo DS	AQ Interactive	Lead developer
2009	A Kappa's Trail	Nintendo DSi	Nintendo	Lead developer
2009	Professor Layton's London Life (Note: Co-developed with Level-5)	Nintendo DS	Level-5	Co-developer
2010	Livly Garden	Nintendo DS	Marvelous Entertainment	Lead developer
2011	Super Mario 3D Land (Note: Co-developed with Nintendo Entertainment Analysis & Development)	Nintendo 3DS	Nintendo	Design, level design
2012	Fantasy Life	Nintendo 3DS	Level-5	Co-developer

=== As 1-Up Studio ===
Year	Title	Platform(s)	Publisher	Role
2013	Flipnote Studio 3D	Nintendo 3DS	Nintendo	Design, programming
2013	Super Mario 3D World	Wii U	Nintendo	Design, level design, sound
2014	Captain Toad: Treasure Tracker	Wii U	Nintendo	Design, level design, sound
2015	The Legend of Zelda: Tri Force Heroes (Note: Co-developed with Nintendo Entertainment Planning & Development)	Nintendo 3DS	Nintendo	Design, programming
2017	Super Mario Odyssey	Nintendo Switch	Nintendo	Design, level design, CG tool programming, sound
2018	Captain Toad: Treasure Tracker	Nintendo 3DS, Nintendo Switch	Nintendo	Design, level design, sound
2019	Ring Fit Adventure	Nintendo Switch	Nintendo	Design, planning, programming
2020	Animal Crossing: New Horizons	Nintendo Switch	Nintendo	Design
2020	Super Mario 3D All-Stars (Note: Originally developed by Nintendo EAD (64 & Sunshine) and Nintendo EAD Tokyo (Galaxy))	Nintendo Switch	Nintendo	Design
2021	Super Mario 3D World + Bowser's Fury	Nintendo Switch	Nintendo	Design, level design, CG tool programming, sound
2025	Mario Kart World	Nintendo Switch 2	Nintendo	Design
2025	Donkey Kong Bananza	Nintendo Switch 2	Nintendo	Design, level design, programming, sound
2026	Super Mario Bros. Wonder – Nintendo Switch 2 Edition + Meetup in Bellabel Park	Nintendo Switch 2	Nintendo	Design, level design, programming
2026	Nintendo Switch Sports Resort	Nintendo Switch 2	Nintendo	
