= 2006 in video games =

2006 saw the release of such video game sequels and prequels as Grand Theft Auto: Vice City Stories, Madden NFL 07, Tony Hawk's Project 8, Tom Clancy's Rainbow Six: Vegas, New Super Mario Bros., Sonic the Hedgehog, and The Legend of Zelda: Twilight Princess, alongside such new releases as Bully, Company of Heroes, Dead Rising, Gears of War, and Ōkami. Two new home consoles were released during the year: Nintendo's Wii and Sony's PlayStation 3.

The year's best-selling game console was the Nintendo DS, while the year's best-selling video game was New Super Mario Bros. for the DS. The year's most critically acclaimed title was The Legend of Zelda: Twilight Princess for Nintendo's GameCube and Wii consoles.

== Legend ==
Video game platforms
DS	Nintendo DS, DSiWare, iQue DS	GBA	Game Boy Advance, iQue GBA	GCN	GameCube
LIN	Linux, SteamOS	OSX	macOS	PS2	PlayStation 2
PS3	PlayStation 3	PSN	PlayStation Network	PSP	PlayStation Portable
Steam	Steam	Wii	Wii, WiiWare, Wii Virtual Console	WIN	Windows, all versions Windows 95 and up
XB360	Xbox 360, Xbox 360 Live Arcade	XB	Xbox, Xbox Live Arcade		

== Financial performance ==
=== Best-selling hardware by region ===
Best-selling game consoles of 2006 in Japan, Europe, and North America
Rank	Console	Manufacturer	Sales			
Rank	Console	Manufacturer	Japan	North America	Europe	Combined
1	DS	Nintendo	8,862,969	5,300,000	6,400,000	20,562,969
2	PS2	Sony	1,547,866	4,700,000	6,000,000	12,247,866
3	PSP	Sony	1,946,911	3,000,000	4,000,000	8,946,911
4	XB360	Microsoft	208,697	3,900,000	2,000,000	6,108,697
5	Wii	Nintendo	998,118	1,100,000	700,000	2,798,118
6	PS3	Sony	466,716	700,000	—N/a	1,166,716
7	GBA	Nintendo	433,336	—N/a	—N/a	433,336
8	GCN	Nintendo	89,775	—N/a	—N/a	89,775

=== Best-selling video games ===
Worldwide

Best-selling video games worldwide in 2006
Rank	Title	Platform(s)	Sales			
Rank	Title	Platform(s)	Japan	United States	Europe	Worldwide
1	New Super Mario Bros.	DS	3,840,296	2,000,000	1,000,000+	8,640,000
2	Madden NFL 07		2,063+	3,900,000+	—N/a	5,000,000+
3	Pokémon Diamond / Pearl	DS	4,355,495	—N/a	—N/a	4,355,495
4	Pro Evolution Soccer 6 (Winning Eleven 10)		1,292,472+	—N/a	3,000,000+	4,292,472+
5	Brain Age: Train Your Brain in Minutes a Day! (Brain Training)	DS	1,991,116	1,100,000	1,000,000+	4,091,116+
6	Final Fantasy XII	PS2	2,400,000+	1,500,000+	—N/a	4,000,000
7	More Brain Training (Brain Age 2)	DS	3,748,638	—N/a	—N/a	3,748,638
8	Animal Crossing: Wild World (Oideyo Dōbutsu no Mori)	DS	2,485,264	—N/a	1,000,000+	3,485,264+
9	FIFA 07		—N/a	—N/a	—N/a	3,000,000+
9	Need for Speed: Carbon		24,904+	871,600+	—N/a	3,000,000+
9	The Sims 2: Pets		2,229+	—N/a	—N/a	3,000,000+

Japan

Best-selling video games in Japan
Rank	Title	Platform(s)	Publisher	Sales	Ref.
1	Pokémon Diamond / Pearl	DS	Nintendo	4,355,495	
2	New Super Mario Bros.	DS	Nintendo	3,840,296	
3	More Brain Training (Brain Age 2)	DS	Nintendo	3,748,638	
4	Oideyo Dōbutsu no Mori (Animal Crossing: Wild World)	DS	Nintendo	2,485,264	
5	Final Fantasy XII	PS2	Square Enix	2,400,000+	
6	Brain Training (Brain Age)	DS	Nintendo	1,991,116	
7	English Training	DS	Nintendo	1,662,573	
8	Winning Eleven 10 (Pro Evolution Soccer 6)	PS2, PSP	Konami	1,292,472	
9	Mario Kart DS	DS	Nintendo	1,115,082	
10	Tetris DS	DS	Nintendo	985,246	

United States

Best-selling video games in the United States
Rank	Title	Platform(s)	Publisher	Sales	Ref.
1	Madden NFL 07	PS2, XB360	EA Sports	3,900,000	
2	New Super Mario Bros.	DS	Nintendo	2,000,000	
3	Gears of War	XB360	Microsoft Game Studios	1,800,000	
4	Kingdom Hearts II	PS2	Square Enix	1,700,000	
5	Final Fantasy XII	PS2	Square Enix	1,500,000+	
6	The Legend of Zelda: Twilight Princess	Wii, GCN	Nintendo	1,500,000	
7	Guitar Hero II	PS2	RedOctane	1,300,000	
8	Brain Age: Train Your Brain in Minutes a Day!	DS	Nintendo	1,100,000	
8	Call of Duty 3		Activision	1,100,000	
10	Tom Clancy's Ghost Recon: Advanced Warfighter	XB360	Ubisoft	1,000,000	
10	NCAA Football 07	PS2	EA Sports	1,000,000	

Best-selling video games by platform (NPD Group)
Platform	Title	Publisher	Sales	Ref.
GCN	Sonic Riders	Sega	Unknown	
DS	New Super Mario Bros.	Nintendo	2,000,000	
WIN	World of Warcraft	Blizzard Entertainment	Unknown	
PS2	Madden NFL 07	Electronic Arts	2,800,000	
PS3	Resistance: Fall of Man	Sony Computer Entertainment	Unknown	
XB	Madden NFL 07	Electronic Arts	Unknown	
XB360	Gears of War	Microsoft Game Studios	1,800,000	
Wii	The Legend of Zelda: Twilight Princess	Nintendo	Unknown	

United Kingdom

Best-selling video games in the United Kingdom (ELSPA)
Rank	Title	Publisher
1	FIFA 07	EA Sports
2	Pro Evolution Soccer 6	Konami
3	Need for Speed: Carbon	EA Games
4	Grand Theft Auto: Liberty City Stories	Rockstar Games
5	Lego Star Wars II: The Original Trilogy	LucasArts
6	The Sims 2: Pets	EA Games
7	Cars	THQ
8	Tomb Raider: Legend	Eidos Interactive
9	The Sims 2	EA Games
10	WWE SmackDown vs. Raw 2007	THQ

== Top-rated games ==
=== Critically acclaimed games ===
Metacritic (MC) and GameRankings (GR) are aggregators of video game journalism reviews.

2006 games and expansions scoring at least 88/100 (MC) or 87.5% (GR)
Game	Publisher	Release Date	Platform	MC score	GR score
The Legend of Zelda: Twilight Princess	Nintendo	December 2, 2006	GCN	96/100	95%
The Legend of Zelda: Twilight Princess	Nintendo	November 19, 2006	Wii	95/100	94.58%
Gears of War	Microsoft Game Studios	November 7, 2006	XB360	94/100	93.97%
The Elder Scrolls IV: Oblivion	2K Games	March 20, 2006	XB360	94/100	93.85%
The Elder Scrolls IV: Oblivion	2K Games	March 20, 2006	WIN	94/100	93.29%
Company of Heroes	THQ	September 13, 2006	WIN	93/100	93.93%
Ōkami	Capcom	April 20, 2006	PS2	93/100	92.65%
Guitar Hero II	RedOctane	November 7, 2006	PS2	92/100	92.07%
Final Fantasy VI Advance	Square Enix	November 30, 2006	GBA	92/100	91.02%
Final Fantasy XII	Square Enix	March 16, 2006	PS2	92/100	90.77%
Tom Clancy's Ghost Recon Advanced Warfighter	Ubisoft	March 9, 2006	XB360	90/100	90.47%
GTR 2 – FIA GT Racing Game	10tacle Studios	September 29, 2006	WIN	90/100	89.4%
Tom Clancy's Rainbow Six: Vegas	Ubisoft	November 22, 2006	XB360	88/100	89.39%
Tom Clancy's Splinter Cell: Double Agent	Ubisoft	October 24, 2006	XB	89/100	89.31%
New Super Mario Bros.	Nintendo	May 15, 2006	DS	89/100	89.07%
Burnout Revenge	Electronic Arts	March 7, 2006	XB360	89/100	88.57%
Armadillo Run	Peter Stock	April 22, 2006	WIN	88/100	89%
Elite Beat Agents	Nintendo	November 6, 2006	DS	87/100	88.33%
Tekken 5: Dark Resurrection	Namco Bandai Games	July 6, 2006	PSP	88/100	88.27%
NCAA Football 07	EA Sports	July 18, 2006	XB	88/100	88.12%
Devil May Cry 3: Special Edition	Capcom	January 24, 2006	PS2	87/100	88%
Medieval II: Total War	Sega	November 10, 2006	WIN	88/100	87.18%
Disgaea: Afternoon of Darkness	Nippon Ichi Software	November 30, 2006	PSP	87/100	87.77%

== Major awards ==
Category/Organization		3rd British Academy Games Awards October 6, 2006	24th Golden Joystick Awards October 27, 2006	VGA December 13, 2006	10th Annual Interactive Achievement Awards February 9, 2007		7th Game Developers Choice Awards March 7, 2007
Game of the Year		Tom Clancy's Ghost Recon Advanced Warfighter	The Elder Scrolls IV: Oblivion		Gears of War		
Mobile/Handheld	Mobile	—N/a	Grand Theft Auto: Liberty City Stories	SWAT Force	Orcs & Elves		—N/a
Mobile/Handheld	Handheld	—N/a	Grand Theft Auto: Liberty City Stories	New Super Mario Bros.	Brain Age: Train Your Brain in Minutes a Day!		—N/a
Innovation		Dr. Kawashima's Brain Training: How Old Is Your Brain?	Xbox Live Marketplace	—N/a	Wii Sports		Line Rider, Ōkami, Wii Sports
Artistic Achievement or Graphics (Note: Certain award presentations combine these categories.)	Animation	Shadow of the Colossus	—N/a	Gears of War	Gears of War		Gears of War
Artistic Achievement or Graphics	Art Direction	Shadow of the Colossus	—N/a	Gears of War	Gears of War		Gears of War
Audio	Music	Tomb Raider: Legend	—N/a	The Elder Scrolls IV: Oblivion	LocoRoco		Guitar Hero II
Audio	Sound Design	Electroplankton	—N/a	—N/a	Call of Duty 3		Guitar Hero II
Audio	Soundtrack	Guitar Hero	Need for Speed: Carbon	Guitar Hero II			Guitar Hero II
Character Design or Performance	Male	LocoRoco; LocoRoco	—N/a	Patrick Stewart as Emperor Uriel Septim VII; The Elder Scrolls IV: Oblivion	John DiMaggio as Marcus Fenix; Gears of War		Ōkami
Character Design or Performance	Female	LocoRoco; LocoRoco	—N/a	Vida Guerra as Femme Fatale Isabelle; Scarface: The World Is Yours	Louise Ridgeway as Leafos; Viva Piñata		Ōkami
Game Design		Lego Star Wars II: The Original Trilogy	—N/a		Wii Sports		
Narrative		Psychonauts	—N/a		The Legend of Zelda: Twilight Princess		
Technical Achievement	Gameplay Engineering	Tom Clancy's Ghost Recon Advanced Warfighter	—N/a	Nintendo Wii	Wii Sports		Gears of War
Technical Achievement	Visual Engineering	Tom Clancy's Ghost Recon Advanced Warfighter	—N/a	Nintendo Wii	Gears of War		Gears of War
Multiplayer/Online		Dungeons and Dragons Online: Stormreach	Age of Empires III	Gears of War			—N/a
Action/Adventure	Action/Shooter	Shadow of the Colossus	—N/a	Gears of War	Tom Clancy's Rainbow Six: Vegas		—N/a
Action/Adventure	Adventure	Shadow of the Colossus	—N/a	Dead Rising	Gears of War		—N/a
Casual/Family or Children	Casual/Family	Buzz!: The BIG Quiz	Nintendogs	—N/a	Guitar Hero II		—N/a
Casual/Family or Children	Children	LocoRoco	Nintendogs	—N/a	LocoRoco		—N/a
Fighting		—N/a		Mortal Kombat: Armageddon	Fight Night Round 3		—N/a
Role-Playing	RPG	—N/a		The Elder Scrolls IV: Oblivion	The Elder Scrolls IV: Oblivion		—N/a
Role-Playing	MMORPG	—N/a		The Elder Scrolls IV: Oblivion	Guild Wars Nightfall		—N/a
Sports	Individual	Fight Night Round 3	—N/a	Tony Hawk's Project 8	Tony Hawk's Project 8		—N/a
Sports	Team	Fight Night Round 3	—N/a	NBA 2K7	Tony Hawk's Project 8		—N/a
Racing		—N/a		Burnout Revenge (XB360)			—N/a
Strategy/Simulation	Strategy	Rise and Fall: Civilizations at War	—N/a		Company of Heroes		—N/a
Strategy/Simulation	Simulation	The Movies	—N/a		Microsoft Flight Simulator X		—N/a
Special Award		—N/a	Favourite Character Award	—N/a	Hall of Fame	Lifetime Achievement Award	Lifetime Achievement Award
Special Award		—N/a	Lara Croft; Tomb Raider series	—N/a	Dani Bunten	Minoru Arakawa, Howard Lincoln	Shigeru Miyamoto

== Major events ==
Date	Event	Ref.
January 5	Vivendi Universal Games acquires High Moon Studios (formerly Sammy Studios, Inc), which gained independence from Sammy in 2005.	
January 9	Take-Two Interactive acquires Irrational Games.	
January 26	Sony reports that strong sales of the PlayStation Portable helped the company make a profit of ¥70 billion, the first time in 11 years that the company has managed to avoid an annual loss.	
January 26	Microsoft announces $293 million losses in its Home and Entertainment division, record revenues overall.	
January 26	Nintendo reports declining GameCube and Game Boy Advance sales but increased profits: ¥92.2 billion.	
January 26	Nintendo announces its newly redesigned handheld, the Nintendo DS Lite. The new model is lighter, smaller, has configurable brightness and features an improved user interface.	
January 26	Konami Corp. announces the list of titles it expects to ship in 2006, ranging from Beatmania to Metal Gear Solid 3: Subsistence, and covering multiple platforms.	
January 26	Public schools in West Virginia will add Dance Dance Revolution by Konami to their curriculum, in an effort to combat obesity.	
January 27	Players of the Horde clan from World of Warcraft start the "Gamers Against No Kash" charity, to pay the subscription fees for valuable players strapped for cash.	
January 27	Microsoft of Japan made a statement to Japanese game magazine Famitsu regarding the Xbox 360 launch. "It was a lot more difficult than we had imagined. We couldn't prepare the launch titles that we had promised, and it made an impact," said Microsoft of Japan Xbox chief of operations Yoshihiro Maruyama. At the launch of the first Xbox in Japan, more units were sold in three days than have been sold of the Xbox 360 in one month.	
January 27	The PlayStation Portable 2.01-2.50 firmware versions, previously considered unhackable, are hacked by Fanjita.	
January 27	The Los Angeles attorney's office sues Rockstar Games and Take-Two Interactive over the Hot Coffee mod.	
January 27	The Nintendo DS returns to the top of the weekly Japanese charts, with 64,515 units sold compared to 38,271 for the PlayStation Portable. The PlayStation 2 is third with 26,135 units sold, while the Xbox 360 continues to sell poorly (just 3,616, less than the GameCube). The five best-selling games were Brain Training for Adults 2, Animal Crossing: Wild World, Super Mario Strikers, Brain Training for Adults and Mario Kart DS, all published by Nintendo.	
January 27	Microsoft lowers its estimate of Xbox 360 sales in its first 90 days from 2.75 to 3.0 million units to 2.5 million due to supply shortage. The yearly estimate (4.5 to 5.5 million) is unchanged since Microsoft plans to increase its console production with the help of a new manufacturer, Celestica. Meanwhile, Microsoft postpones the Australian 360 launch from March 2 to 23, 2006 due to a "short term manufacturing challenge".	
January 30	A mandatory update for Xbox Live on the Xbox 360 was released. Microsoft claimed the update was for bugfixes and improvements. Members of the modding community claim that "the true purpose of this update was to halt the progress of the modding community".	
January 30	Nintendo released a statement regarding the Red Tulip phenomenon on Animal Crossing: Wild World, stating "We have isolated the problem and determined that there was a temporary error with the upload tool when this letter was posted". Earlier, there had been speculation that the tulips were a result of black hat hackers.	
January 30	Shares of Take-Two Interactive, the controversial creator of the Grand Theft Auto series, rose Monday after news that the company was in takeover talks with an unnamed buyer.	
January 31	Sony is reportedly building an Xbox Live-killer for the PlayStation 3.	
January 31	StarForce, a DRM maker for computer games, threatens to sue popular weblog Boing Boing for criticising its products.	
January 31	Blizzard Entertainment responds to the LGBT debate happening in World of Warcraft. The company stated: "To promote a positive game environment for everyone and help prevent such harassment from taking place as best we can, we prohibit mention of topics related to sensitive real-world subjects in open chat within the game, and we do our best to take action whenever we see such topics being broadcast."	
January 31	Sony announces that ten servers will be merged with ten others on Everquest 2. Players are cautiously optimistic.	
January 31	CNET reports that Cisco Systems might be interested in buying Nintendo.	
February	Tiger Telematics, the manufacturer of the Gizmondo handheld console, files for bankruptcy.	
February 6	After Tiger Telematics' bankruptcy, the Gizmondo handheld console is discontinued, only selling nearly 25,000 units.	
February 15	ScrewAttack, a video game-related website is launched.	
May	IEMA (Interactive Entertainment Merchants Association) successfully merged with VSDA (Video Software Dealers Association) to form combined organization EMA (Entertainment Merchants Association)	
May 10–12	The 12th annual E3 is held in Los Angeles, California, United States.	
June 21	The Sonic the Hedgehog franchise celebrated its 15th anniversary.	
July	ECA (Entertainment Consumers Association) formed.	
July	Atari plans to sell-off their game development studios.	
October	ECA (Entertainment Consumers Association) soft-launched.	
November 7	Left Behind Games releases Left Behind: Eternal Forces amid much controversy.	
November 17	Sony releases the PlayStation 3 in North America.	
November 19	Nintendo releases the Wii.	
December 13	The 2006 Spike Video Game Awards are held.	
Unknown	Esports organization OpTic Gaming is founded.	

== Hardware releases ==
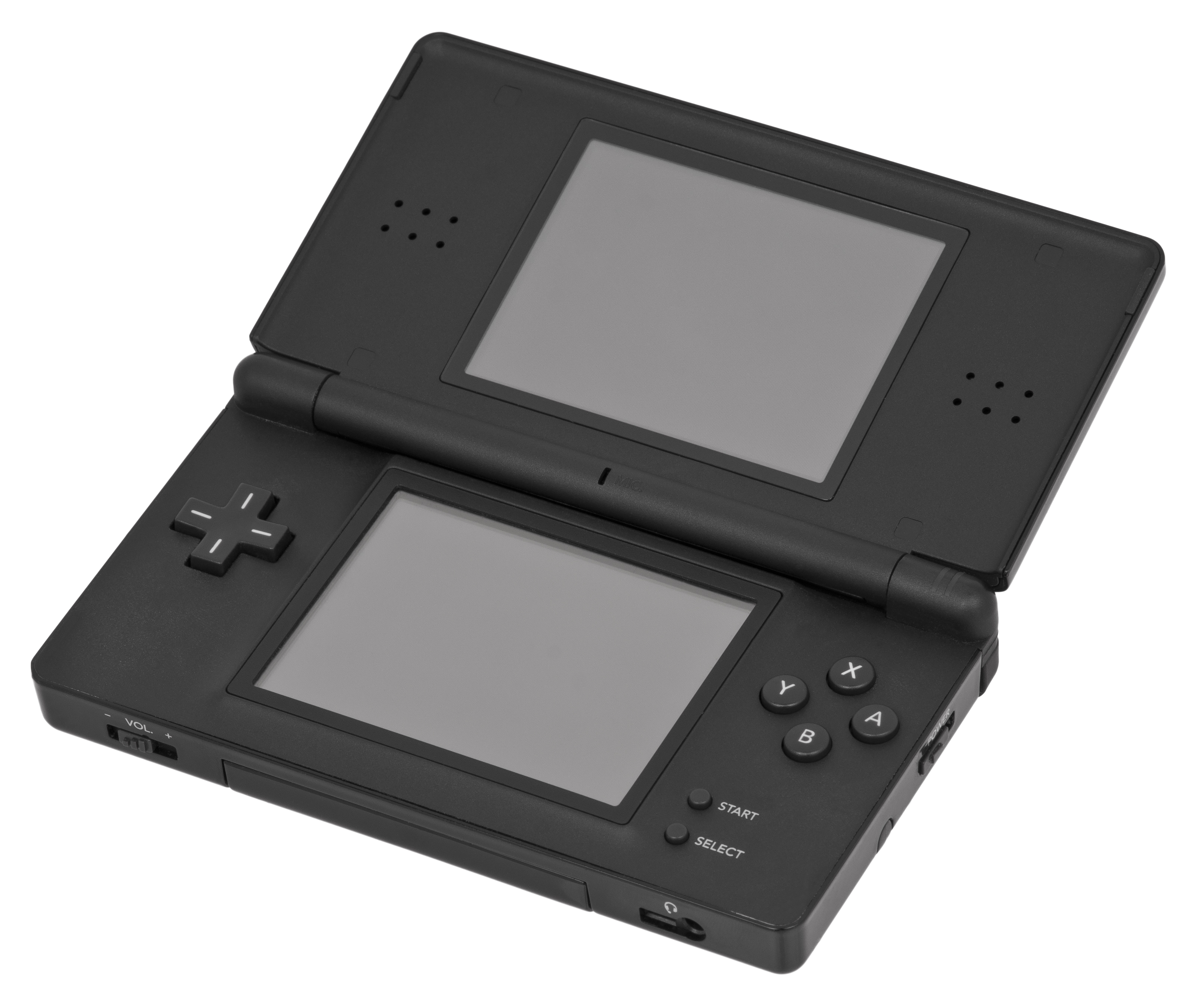
Nintendo DS Lite

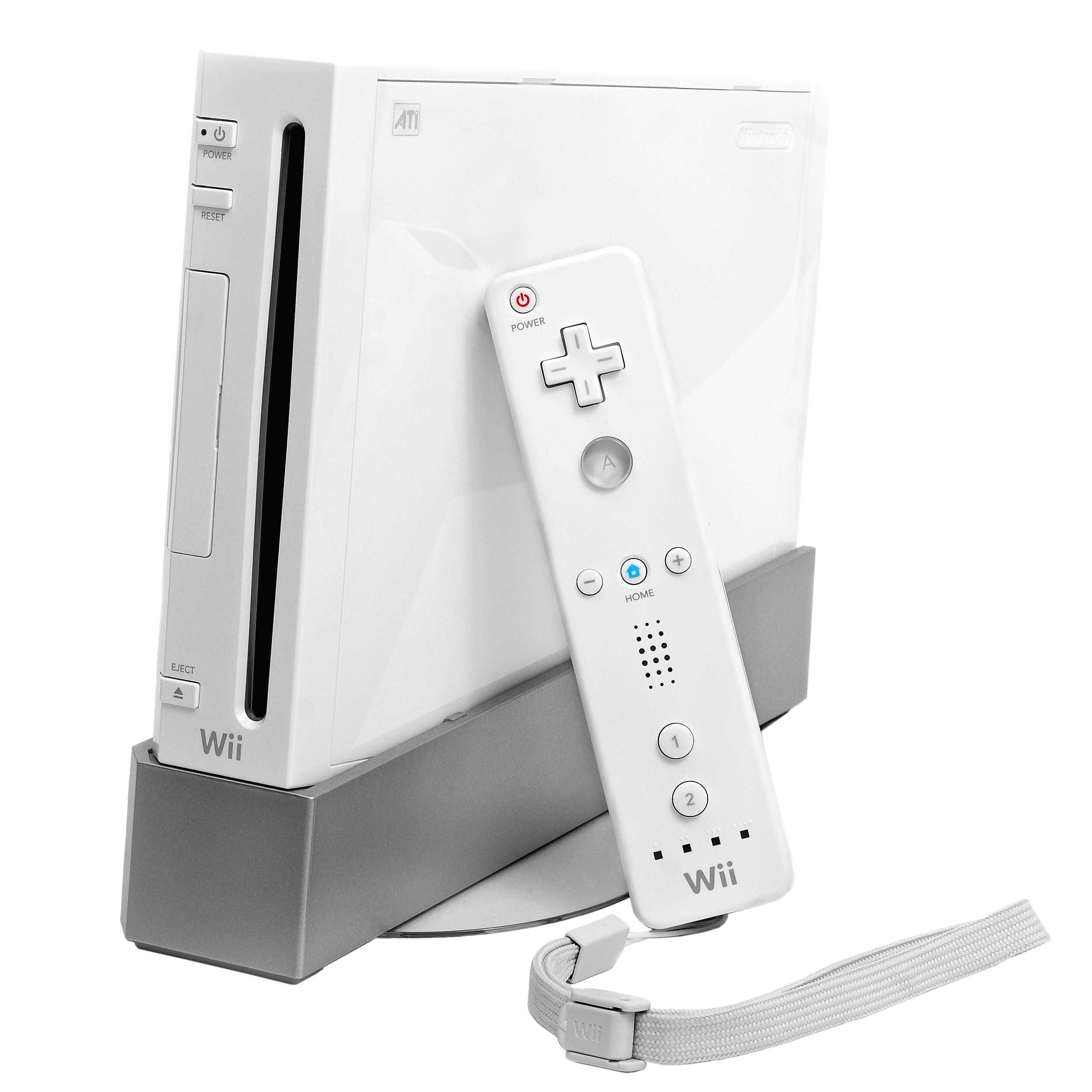
Nintendo Wii

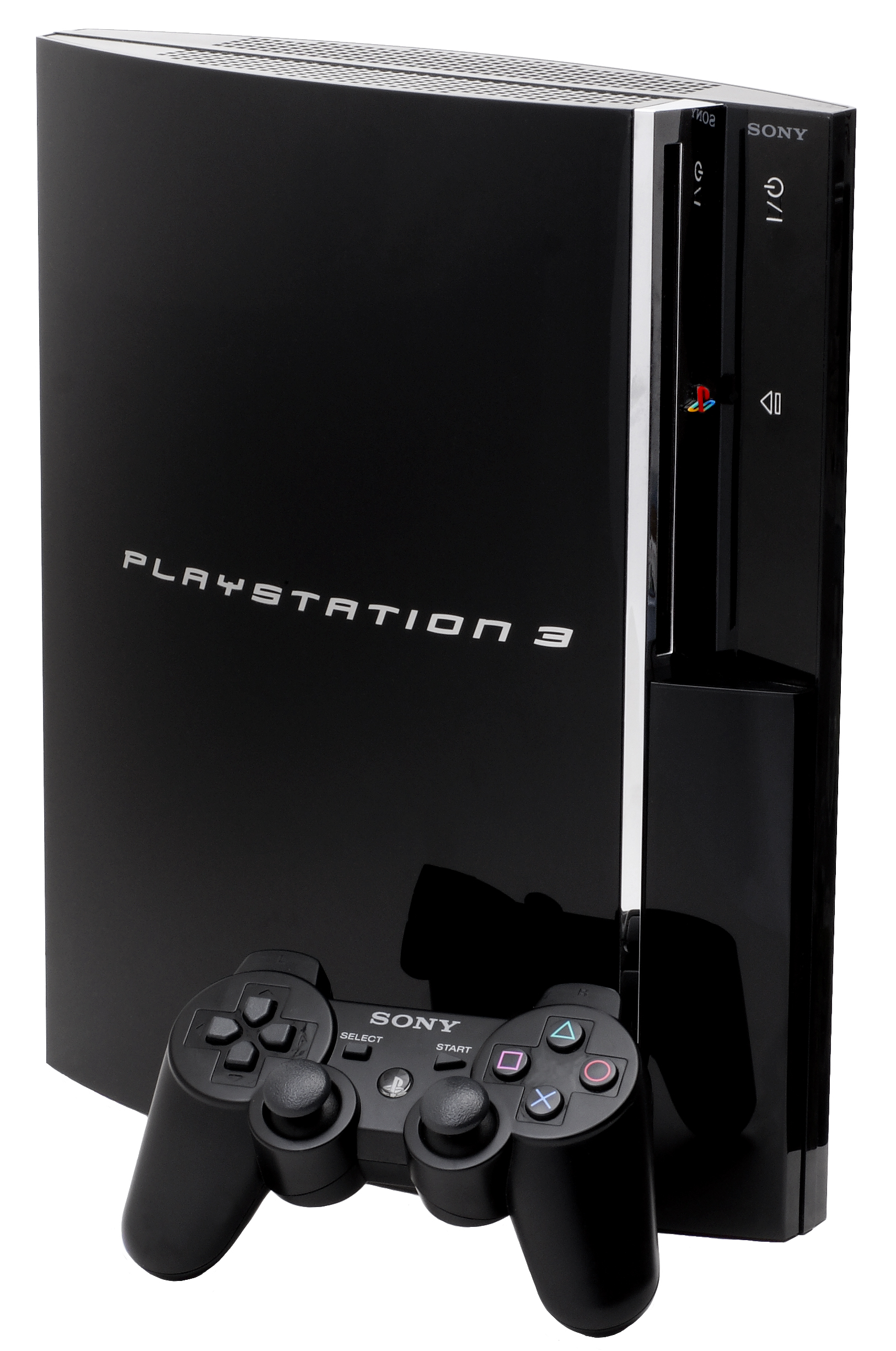
PlayStation 3

Date	Console	Ref.
February 2	Xbox 360^{CO/MX}	
March 2	Nintendo DS Lite^{JP}	
March 23	Xbox 360^{AU}	
June 1	Nintendo DS Lite^{AU}	
June 11	Nintendo DS Lite^{NA}	
June 23	Nintendo DS Lite^{EU}	
November 11	PlayStation 3^{JP}	
November 17	PlayStation 3^{NA}	
November 19	Wii^{NA}	
December 2	Wii^{JP}	
December 7	Wii^{AU}	
December 8	Wii^{EU}	

== Games released in 2006 ==
Release Date	Title	Platform	Genre	Ref.
January 9	Electroplankton	DS		
January 10	Mega Man X Collection	GCN, PS2		
January 10	Nicktoons Unite!	DS		
January 10	PQ: Practical Intelligence Quotient	PSP		
January 17	25 to Life	WIN, PS2, XB		
January 17	Ape Escape 3	PS2		
January 18	Samurai Shodown V	XB		
January 23	True Swing Golf	DS		
January 25	Marble Blast Ultra	XB360		
January 31	Tamagotchi Connection: Corner Shop	DS		
February 6	Drill Dozer	GBA		
February 7	Resident Evil: Deadly Silence	DS		
February 7	Street Fighter Alpha 3 MAX	PSP		
February 7	Tales of Legendia	PS2		
February 7	The Rub Rabbits!	DS		
February 9	Siren 2 (JP)	PS2		
February 14	Age of Empires: The Age of Kings	DS		
February 14	Drakengard 2	PS2		
February 14	Empire Earth II: The Art of Supremacy	WIN		
February 14	Exit	PSP		
February 14	Full Auto	XB360		
February 14	Grandia III	PS2		
February 14	Marc Eckō's Getting Up: Contents Under Pressure	WIN, PS2, XB		
February 14	State of Emergency 2	PS2		
February 18	Star Wars: Empire at War	WIN		
February 21	EverQuest II: Kingdom of Sky	WIN		
February 21	MS Saga: A New Dawn	PS2		
February 21	Sonic Riders	PS2, XB, GCN		
February 21	Super Monkey Ball: Touch & Roll	DS		
February 22	TOCA Race Driver 3	WIN, PS2, XB		
February 27	Galactic Civilizations II: Dread Lords	WIN		
February 27	MX vs. ATV: On the Edge	PSP		
February 28	Dungeons & Dragons Online: Stormreach	WIN		
February 28	Black	PS2, XB		
February 28	Final Fight: Streetwise	PS2, XB		
February 28	Generation of Chaos	PSP		
February 28	Tokyo Xtreme Racer	PSP		
March 2	The Lord of the Rings: The Battle for Middle-earth II	WIN		
March 2	The Sims 2: Open for Business	WIN		
March 6	Pokémon Trozei!	DS		
March 6	SpongeBob SquarePants: The Yellow Avenger	PSP		
March 6	Tales of Phantasia	GBA		
March 7	Burnout Revenge	XB360		
March 7	Dragon Ball Z: Shin Budokai	PSP		
March 7	Naruto: Ninja Council	GBA		
March 7	Shadow Hearts: From the New World	PS2		
March 8	Onimusha: Dawn of Dreams	PS2		
March 9	Tom Clancy's Ghost Recon Advanced Warfighter	XB, XB360		
March 13	The Outfit	XB360		
March 14	Driver: Parallel Lines	PS2, XB		
March 14	Ice Age 2: The Meltdown (USA)	WIN, PS2, XB, GCN, GBA, DS		
March 14	Mega Man Powered Up	PSP		
March 14	Metal Gear Solid 3: Subsistence	PS2		
March 14	Neopets: Petpet Adventures: The Wand of Wishing	PSP		
March 14	Syphon Filter: Dark Mirror	PSP		
March 15	Battlefield 2: Euro Force	WIN		
March 16	Final Fantasy XII (JP)	PS2		
March 17	24: The Game	WIN, GCN, PS2, XB360, DS		
March 17	Call of Cthulhu: Dark Corners of the Earth (EU)	WIN		
March 17	Keepsake (EU)	WIN		
March 20	Metroid Prime Hunters	DS		
March 20	Tetris DS	DS		
March 20	The Elder Scrolls IV: Oblivion	WIN, XB360		
March 21	Metal Gear Acid 2	PSP		
March 21	Me & My Katamari	PSP		
March 21	Suikoden V	PS2		
March 21	Tao's Adventure: Curse of the Demon Seal	DS		
March 21	The Godfather: The Game	WIN, PS2, XB		
March 21	Tom Clancy's Splinter Cell: Essentials	PSP		
March 22	Viewtiful Joe: Red Hot Rumble	PSP		
March 22	Worms: Open Warfare	DS, PSP		
March 23	Blazing Angels: Squadrons of WWII	XB, XB360		
March 23	Cooking Mama	DS		
March 24	True Crime: New York City	WIN		
March 26	Act of War: High Treason	WIN		
March 28	Blazing Angels: Squadrons of WWII	WIN		
March 28	Dynasty Warriors 5: Empires	PS2, XB360		
March 28	Far Cry Instincts: Predator	XB360		
March 28	Harvest Moon: Magical Melody	GCN		
March 28	Kingdom Hearts II (USA)	PS2		
March 28	Rumble Roses XX	XB360		
March 28	Tom Clancy's Ghost Recon Advanced Warfighter	PS2		
March 28	Untold Legends: The Warrior's Code	PSP		
March 31	Animal Crossing: Wild World (EU)	DS		
March 31	Ice Age 2: The Meltdown (EU)	WIN, PS2, XB, GCN, GBA, DS		
April 3	James Bond 007: From Russia with Love	PSP		
April 4	Bust-a-Move Deluxe	PSP		
April 4	Tourist Trophy	PS2		
April 6	The Silent Hill Experience	PSP		
April 11	Battlefield 2: Modern Combat	XB360		
April 11	Condemned: Criminal Origins	WIN		
April 11	Odama	GCN		
April 11	Tomb Raider: Legend	WIN, PS2, XB, XB360		
April 13	Auto Assault	WIN		
April 17	Brain Age: Train Your Brain in Minutes a Day	DS		
April 17	Dreamfall: The Longest Journey	WIN		
April 18	Dreamfall: The Longest Journey	XB		
April 18	Final Fantasy XI	XB360		
April 18	Final Fantasy XI: Treasures of Aht Urhgan	WIN, PS2		
April 18	Blades of Thunder II	DS		
April 18	The King of Fighters Neowave	XB		
April 18	Tokyo Xtreme Racer: Drift	PS2		
April 20	Mother 3 (JP)	GBA		
April 24	Black & White 2: Battle of the Gods	WIN		
April 24	Rampage: Total Destruction	PS2, GCN		
April 25	Ace Combat Zero: The Belkan War	PS2		
April 25	Atelier Iris 2: The Azoth of Destiny	PS2		
April 25	Guilty Gear Dust Strikers	DS		
April 25	LostMagic	DS		
April 25	OutRun 2006: Coast 2 Coast	PS2, XB, PSP		
April 25	WinBack 2: Project Poseidon	PS2, XB		
April 27	KOF: Maximum Impact 2 (JP)	PS2		
April 28	Guild Wars: Factions	WIN		
May 1	Half-Life Deathmatch: Source	WIN		
May 2	Seed	WIN		
May 3	Tom Clancy's Ghost Recon Advanced Warfighter	WIN		
May 9	NBA Ballers: Rebound	PSP		
May 9	Over the Hedge (NA)	WIN, PS2, XB, GCN, GBA		
May 9	Over the Hedge (Nintendo DS) (NA)	DS		
May 9	Rise of Nations: Rise of Legends	WIN		
May 10	Sin Episodes: Emergence	WIN		
May 15	New Super Mario Bros.	DS		
May 16	Heroes of Might and Magic V	WIN		
May 16	X-Men: The Official Game	WIN, PS2, XB, GCN, XB360, GBA, DS, PSP		
May 16	Zoo Tycoon 2: African Adventure	WIN		
May 19	The Da Vinci Code	WIN, PS2, XB		
May 23	Jaws: Unleashed	PS2, XB		
May 23	Lemmings	PSP		
May 23	Monster Hunter Freedom	PSP		
May 23	Rockstar Games Presents Table Tennis	XB360		
May 23	Steambot Chronicles	PS2		
May 30	Hitman: Blood Money	WIN, PS2, XB, XB360		
May 30	X2: The Threat	LIN		
June 1	Half-Life 2: Episode One	WIN		
June 5	Magnetica	DS		
June 6	AND 1 Streetball	PS2, XB		
June 6	Battlefield 2: Armored Fury	WIN		
June 6	Cars (USA)	WIN, PS2, XB, GCN, GBA, DS, PSP		
June 6	Gradius Collection	PSP		
June 6	Grand Theft Auto: Liberty City Stories	PS2		
June 6	Race Driver 2006	PSP		
June 6	The Movies: Stunts & Effects	WIN		
June 8	Cars (AU)	WIN, PS2, XB, GCN, GBA, DS, PSP		
June 8	Over the Hedge (EU)	WIN, PS2, XB, GCN, GBA		
June 9	Over the Hedge (Nintendo DS) (EU)	DS		
June 12	Major League Baseball 2K6	GCN		
June 12	MotoGP '06	XB360		
June 12	Rise and Fall: Civilizations at War	WIN		
June 13	Armored Core: Last Raven (USA)	PS2		
June 13	Mega Man Battle Network 6	GBA		
June 14	Over the Hedge (AU)	WIN, PS2, XB, GCN, GBA		
June 14	Over the Hedge (Nintendo DS) (AU)	DS		
June 14	Point Blank DS	DS		
June 15	Gorky 17	LIN		
June 15	Urban Chaos: Riot Response	PS2, XB		
June 20	Break 'Em All	DS		
June 20	NFL Head Coach	WIN, PS2, XB		
June 20	The Legend of Heroes II: Prophecy of the Moonlight Witch	PSP		
June 21	Tomb Raider: Legend	PSP		
June 26	Sudoku Gridmaster	DS		
June 26	Titan Quest	WIN		
June 27	Astonishia Story	PSP		
June 27	Hi Hi Puffy AmiYumi: The Genie and the Amp	DS		
June 27	Over G Fighters	XB360		
June 28	Babar to the Rescue	GBA		
June 28	Juiced: Eliminator	PSP		
June 28	MTX Mototrax	PSP		
June 28	Pirates of the Caribbean: The Legend of Jack Sparrow	WIN, PS2		
June 29	Panzer Command	WIN		
June 30	Flatout 2 (EU)	WIN, XB		
July 5	The Lord of the Rings: The Battle for Middle-earth II	XB360		
July 11	Chromehounds	XB360		
July 11	Prey	WIN, XB360		
July 13	Persona 3 (JP)	PS2		
July 14	Cars (EU)	WIN, PS2, XB, GCN, GBA, DS, PSP		
July 18	Blade Dancer: Lineage of Light	PSP		
July 18	Miami Vice: The Game	PSP		
July 18	Monster House (NA)	PS2, GCN, GBA, DS		
July 18	NCAA Football 07	PS2, XB, XB360, PSP		
July 18	Super Dragon Ball Z	PS2		
July 18	Valkyrie Profile: Lenneth	PSP		
July 19	Cloning Clyde	XB360		
July 20	AFL Premiership 2006 (AUS)	PS2		
July 24	CivCity: Rome	WIN		
July 24	Civilization IV: Warlords	WIN		
July 24	Nancy Drew: Danger by Design	WIN		
July 25	Tekken: Dark Resurrection	PSP		
July 26	Summon Night: Swordcraft Story	GBA		
July 27	Kamaitachi no Yoru ×3	PS2	Visual novel	
August 1	Barnyard (NA)	WIN, PS2, GCN, GBA		
August 1	Flatout 2 (NA)	WIN, XB		
August 1	Dungeon Siege II: Broken World	WIN		
August 1	Super Monkey Ball Adventure	GCN, PS2		
August 2	Street Fighter II' Hyper Fighting	XB360		
August 3	Rhythm Tengoku	DS, GBA		
August 4	Cold War	LIN		
August 4	Monster House (EU)	PS2, GCN, GBA, DS		
August 8	Dead Rising	XB360		
August 15	Dirge of Cerberus: Final Fantasy VII	PS2		
August 15	Ninety-Nine Nights	XB360		
August 15	SpongeBob SquarePants: Creature from the Krusty Krab	WIN		
August 15	Xyanide	XB		
August 18	Pathologic (UK)	WIN		
August 21	Freedom Wings	DS		
August 21	Tenchu: Dark Secret	DS		
August 22	Pac-Man World Rally	WIN, PS2, GCN, PSP		
August 28	Star Fox Command	DS		
August 29	Bomberman: Act Zero	XB360		
August 29	Def Jam Fight for NY: The Takeover	PSP		
August 29	Disgaea 2: Cursed Memories	PS2		
August 29	Enchanted Arms	XB360		
August 29	One Piece: Grand Adventure	GCN, PS2		
August 29	Saints Row	XB360		
August 29	Super Monkey Ball Adventure	PSP		
August 29	Ultimate Ghosts 'n Goblins	PSP		
August 29	Xenosaga Episode III: Also sprach Zarathustra	PS2		
August 30	The Ship	WIN		
September 1	Roblox	WIN		
September 5	Call of Juarez	WIN		
September 5	LocoRoco	PSP		
September 5	Spy Hunter: Nowhere to Run	PS2, XB		
September 6	Bad Day L.A.	WIN		
September 7	Kengo: Legend of the 9	XB360		
September 7	Monster House (AU)	PS2, GCN, GBA, DS		
September 12	Bomberman PSP	PSP		
September 12	Company of Heroes	WIN		
September 12	IGPX: Immortal Grand Prix	PS2		
September 12	Joint Task Force	WIN		
September 12	LEGO Star Wars II: The Original Trilogy	WIN, PS2, XB, GCN, XB360, DS, PSP		
September 12	MechAssault: Phantom War	DS		
September 12	NHL 07	WIN, PS2, XB, GCN, XB360		
September 12	Rengoku II: The Stairway to Heaven	PSP		
September 12	Rule of Rose	PS2		
September 12	Mega Man ZX	DS		
September 14	Barnyard (AU)	WIN, PS2, GBA		
September 14	The Cheetah Girls	GBA		
September 15	Broken Sword: The Angel of Death (EU)	WIN		
September 15	W.I.T.C.H.	PS2, GCN, XB, GBA, DS		
September 18	Open Season (USA)	WIN, GCN, PS2, XB, XB360, GBA, DS, PSP		
September 18	Pokémon Mystery Dungeon: Blue Rescue Team	DS		
September 18	Pokémon Mystery Dungeon: Red Rescue Team	GBA		
September 19	Danny Phantom: Urban Jungle	GBA, DS		
September 19	Ōkami	PS2		
September 19	The Godfather: The Game	XB360, PSP		
September 19	EverQuest: The Serpent's Spine	WIN		
September 19	Zatch Bell! Mamodo Fury	PS2		
September 22	Just Cause	WIN, PS2, XB, XB360		
September 22	Jaws: Unleashed (EU)	WIN		
September 25	Alex Rider: Stormbreaker	GBA, DS		
September 25	Baten Kaitos Origins (NA)	GCN		
September 25	The Grim Adventures of Billy & Mandy	GCN, PS2		
September 25	Mario vs. Donkey Kong 2: March of the Minis	DS		
September 26	Caesar IV	WIN		
September 26	Dance Dance Revolution SuperNova	PS2		
September 26	The Fast and the Furious	PS2		
September 26	Mage Knight: Destiny's Soldier	DS		
September 26	Spectral Souls: Resurrection of the Ethereal Empires	PSP		
September 26	Valkyrie Profile 2: Silmeria	PS2		
September 28	Pokémon Diamond and Pearl (JP)	DS		
September 28	Kingdom Hearts II (AU, EU)	PS2		
September 29	DEFCON: Everybody Dies (EU)	WIN		
October 2	Unfabulous	GBA		
October 3	Gangs of London	PSP		
October 3	Mercury Meltdown	PSP		
October 4	Star Trek: Encounters	PS2		
October 5	Desperate Housewives: The Game	WIN		
October 6	Heroes of Annihilated Empires	WIN		
October 6	Ice Age 2: The Meltdown (JP)	WIN, PS2, XB, GCN, GBA, DS		
October 6	Open Season (EU)	WIN, GCN, PS2, XB, XB360, GBA, DS, PSP		
October 6	Stacked with Daniel Negreanu	PSP		
October 8	Scarface: The World Is Yours	WIN, PS2, XB		
October 9	Warhammer 40,000: Dawn of War: Dark Crusade	WIN		
October 10	Crash Boom Bang!	DS		
October 10	God Hand	PS2		
October 10	Gun	PSP		
October 10	Tales of the Abyss	PS2		
October 10	The Legend of Spyro: A New Beginning (NA)	PS2, XB, GCN, GBA, DS		
October 11	Mortal Kombat: Armageddon	PS2		
October 12	American Dragon: Jake Long – Attack of the Dark Dragon	DS		
October 12	American Dragon: Jake Long – Rise of the Huntsclan	GBA		
October 12	Nancy Drew: The Creature of Kapu Cave	WIN		
October 13	Barnyard (PAL)	WIN, PS2, GCN, GBA		
October 13	Gothic 3	WIN		
October 13	Microsoft Flight Simulator X	WIN		
October 17	Age of Empires III: The War Chiefs	WIN		
October 17	Battlefield 2142	WIN		
October 17	Bully	PS2		
October 17	Family Guy Video Game! (NA)	PS2, XB, PSP		
October 17	Justice League Heroes	PS2, XB, DS		
October 17	Justice League Heroes: The Flash	GBA		
October 17	Mortal Kombat: Armageddon	XB		
October 17	Sid Meier's Railroads! (NA)	WIN		
October 17	Summon Night: Swordcraft Story 2	GBA		
October 17	The Sims 2: Pets	WIN		
October 17	Tom Clancy's Splinter Cell: Double Agent	XB360		
October 17	Zoo Tycoon 2: Marine Mania	WIN		
October 17	Zoo Tycoon 2: Zookeeper Collection	WIN		
October 18	Football Manager 2007	WIN, OSX		
October 18	Jaws Unleashed (US)	WIN		
October 18	Lumines	XB360		
October 18	SpongeBob SquarePants: Creature from the Krusty Krab (USA)	PS2, GCN, GBA, DS		
October 19	Contact	DS		
October 19	Destroy All Humans! 2	PS2, XB		
October 19	Disney's Kim Possible: What's the Switch?	PS2		
October 20	Medal of Honor: Heroes	PSP		
October 22	Ultimate Mortal Kombat 3	XB360		
October 23	Cars (USA)	XB360		
October 23	Magical Starsign	DS		
October 23	Work Time Fun	PSP		
October 24	Dark Messiah of Might and Magic	WIN		
October 24	F.E.A.R. Extraction Point	WIN		
October 24	Juka and the Monophonic Menace	GBA		
October 24	Marvel: Ultimate Alliance	WIN, PS2, XB, XB360, GBA		
October 24	Nacho Libre	DS		
October 24	Nicktoons: Battle for Volcano Island	PS2, GCN, GBA, DS		
October 24	Phantasy Star Universe	WIN, PS2, XB360		
October 24	Reservoir Dogs	WIN, PS2, XB		
October 24	Scurge: Hive	GBA, DS		
October 24	Star Wars: Empire at War: Forces of Corruption	WIN		
October 24	Tokobot	PS2		
October 24	Tom Clancy's Splinter Cell: Double Agent	PS2, XB, GCN		
October 24	Touch Detective	DS		
October 26	ATV Offroad Fury Pro	PSP		
October 26	Family Guy Video Game! (EU)	PS2, XB		
October 26	Guild Wars Nightfall	WIN		
October 26	Jaws: Unleashed (AU)	WIN		
October 26	Rock 'Em Sock 'Em Robots	GBA		
October 27	The Legend of Spyro: A New Beginning (EU)	PS2, XB, GCN, GBA, DS		
October 30	Dungeon Siege: Thorne of Agony	PSP		
October 30	Pokémon Ranger (NA)	DS		
October 31	ATV Offroad Fury 4	PS2		
October 31	Catscratch	GBA, DS		
October 31	Death Jr. II: Root of Evil	PSP		
October 31	Grand Theft Auto: Vice City Stories	PSP		
October 31	Final Fantasy XII (USA)	PS2		
October 31	Killzone: Liberation	PSP		
October 31	Konductra	DS		
October 31	Need for Speed: Carbon	WIN, PS2, XB, GCN, XB360, PS3		
October 31	Neverwinter Nights 2	WIN		
October 31	Power Stone Collection	PSP		
October 31	The Grim Adventures of Billy & Mandy	GBA		
October 31	Tom and Jerry Tales	GBA, DS		
November 2	Dave Mirra BMX Challenge	PSP		
November 2	Kirby: Squeak Squad (NA)	DS		
November 2	SpongeBob SquarePants: Creature from the Krusty Krab (AU)	PS2, GCN, GBA		
November 2	The Legend of Spyro: A New Beginning (AU)	PS2, XB, GCN, GBA, DS		
November 3	Family Guy Video Game! (AU)	PS2, XB, PSP		
November 3	Foster's Home for Imaginary Friends	GBA		
November 3	Elite Beat Agents	DS		
November 3	Final Fantasy V	GBA		
November 3	Lumines II	PSP		
November 7	Call of Duty 3 (USA)	PS2, XB, XB360		
November 7	Every Extend Extra	PSP		
November 7	Guitar Hero II	PS2		
November 7	Gears of War	XB360		
November 7	SOCOM U.S. Navy SEALs: Combined Assault	PS2		
November 7	The Sopranos: Road to Respect	PS2		
November 7	Tom Clancy's Splinter Cell: Double Agent	WIN		
November 7	Tony Hawk's Project 8	PS2, XB, XB360		
November 8	Bomberman Land Touch!	DS		
November 9	Disney's Chicken Little: Ace in Action	PS2, DS		
November 10	Call of Duty 3 (EU)	XB, XB360		
November 10	SpongeBob SquarePants: Creature from the Krusty Krab (EU)	PS2, GCN, GBA		
November 13	Dead or Alive Xtreme 2	XB360		
November 13	EverQuest II: Echoes of Faydwer	WIN		
November 13	Medieval 2: Total War	WIN		
November 13	Mobile Suit Gundam: Crossfire	PS3		
November 13	Polarium Advance	GBA		
November 13	Yoshi's Island DS	DS		
November 13	Mortal Kombat: Unchained	PSP		
November 14	Bionicle Heroes	WIN, GCN, PS2, XB360, GBA, DS		
November 14	Charlotte's Web	WIN, PS2, GBA, DS		
November 14	EA Replay	PSP		
November 14	Eragon	WIN, PS2, XB, XB360, GBA, DS, PSP		
November 14	Final Fantasy III	DS		
November 14	Gitaroo Man Lives!	PSP		
November 14	Gunpey	PSP		
November 14	Happy Feet (USA)	WIN, PS2, GCN, GBA, DS		
November 14	Heroes of Might and Magic V: Hammers of Fate	WIN		
November 14	Left Behind: Eternal Forces	WIN		
November 14	Rampage: Total Destruction	Wii		
November 14	Rayman Raving Rabbids (handheld) (NA)	GBA		
November 14	Sonic the Hedgehog (2006) (USA)	XB360		
November 14	Tomb Raider: Legend	GCN, GBA, DS		
November 14	Xiaolin Showdown	PS2, PSP		
November 14	Warhammer: Mark of Chaos	WIN		
November 14	WWE SmackDown! vs. RAW 2007	PS2, XB360		
November 15	Call of Duty 3 (AU)	XB360		
November 15	Untold Legends: Dark Kingdom	PS3		
November 15	Xiaolin Showdown	XB		
November 16	Sega Genesis Collection	PS3, PSP		
November 16	Sonic Rivals	PSP		
November 17	Blast Factor	PSN		
November 17	Brain Boost: Gamma Wave	DS		
November 17	Call of Duty 3	PS3		
November 17	Cars (EU)	XB360		
November 17	Cash Guns Chaos DLX	PS3		
November 17	Genji: Days of the Blade	PS3		
November 17	Marvel: Ultimate Alliance	PS3		
November 17	Resistance: Fall of Man	PS3		
November 17	Ridge Racer 7	PS3		
November 17	The Grim Adventures of Billy & Mandy (NA)	Wii		
November 17	Tony Hawk's Project 8	PS3		
November 17	Totally Spies! 2: Undercover	GBA		
November 19	Altered Beast (Genesis)	Wii		
November 19	Avatar: The Last Airbender	Wii		
November 19	Barnyard	Wii		
November 19	Call of Duty 3 (USA)	Wii		
November 19	Cars (USA)	Wii		
November 19	Donkey Kong (NES)	Wii		
November 19	Excite Truck (USA)	Wii		
November 19	F-Zero	Wii		
November 19	Happy Feet (USA)	Wii		
November 19	Mario Bros. (NES)	Wii		
November 19	Marvel: Ultimate Alliance (USA)	Wii		
November 19	Pinball	Wii		
November 19	PocketBike Racer	XB, XB360		
November 19	Rayman Raving Rabbids (USA)	Wii		
November 19	Red Steel (USA)	Wii		
November 19	SimCity (SNES)	Wii		
November 19	Sneak King	XB, XB360		
November 19	Soccer	Wii		
November 19	Solomon's Key (NES)	Wii		
November 19	Sonic the Hedgehog	Wii		
November 19	SpongeBob SquarePants: Creature from the Krusty Krab (USA)	Wii		
November 19	Super Mario 64	Wii		
November 19	Super Monkey Ball: Banana Blitz (USA)	Wii		
November 19	The Legend of Zelda	Wii		
November 19	The Legend of Zelda: Twilight Princess (USA)	Wii		
November 19	Trauma Center: Second Opinion (USA)	Wii		
November 19	Wario's Woods (NES)	Wii		
November 19	Wii Sports (USA)	Wii		
November 20	Tom Clancy's Rainbow Six: Vegas	XB360		
November 21	Bomberman '93	Wii		
November 21	Bonk's Adventure (TurboGrafx-16)	Wii		
November 21	The Elder Scrolls IV: Knights of the Nine	WIN		
November 21	Rapala Tournament Fishing	XB360		
November 21	Thrillville	PS2, XB, PSP		
November 21	Yggdra Union: We'll Never Fight Alone	GBA		
November 22	Call of Duty 3 (AU)	PS2, XB		
November 22	Jeanne d'Arc	PSP		
November 22	Justice League Heroes	PSP		
November 22	Rapala Tournament Fishing	Wii		
November 22	Small Arms	XB360		
November 22	Superman Returns	PS2, XB, XB360, DS		
November 22	Tony Hawk's Project 8	PSP		
November 23	Cars (AU)	XB360		
November 24	Call of Duty 3 (EU)	PS2		
November 24	Happy Feet (EU)	WIN, PS2, GCN, GBA, DS		
November 24	Sonic the Hedgehog (2006) (PAL)	XB360		
November 24	SpongeBob SquarePants: Creature from the Krusty Krab (EU)	DS		
November 27	Super Star Soldier	Wii		
November 27	Totally Spies! 2: Undercover	DS		
November 28	Ecco the Dolphin (Genesis)	Wii		
November 28	Golden Axe (Genesis)	Wii		
November 28	The Lord of the Rings: The Battle for Middle-earth II: The Rise of the Witch-king	WIN		
November 28	Online Chess Kingdoms	PSP		
November 28	Tom Clancy's Splinter Cell: Double Agent	Wii		
November 28	Xiaolin Showdown	DS		
November 29	Garry's Mod	WIN		
November 30	Final Fantasy VI Advance (JP)	GBA		
November 30	Open Season (AU)	WIN, GCN, PS2, XB, XB360, GBA		
November 30	Open Season (USA)	Wii		
November 30	SpongeBob SquarePants: Creature from the Krusty Krab (AU)	DS		
December 1	Family Guy Video Game! (EU)	PSP		
December 4	Cartoon Network Racing	PS2, DS		
December 4	Columns (Genesis)	Wii		
December 4	Donkey Kong Jr. (NES)	Wii		
December 4	Kirby: Squeak Squad (JP)	DS		
December 4	Mercury Meltdown Remix	PS2		
December 4	Ristar	Wii		
December 4	Victory Run	Wii		
December 5	Metal Gear Solid: Portable Ops	PSP		
December 5	Rayman Raving Rabbids (USA)	PS2		
December 5	Star Trek: Legacy	WIN		
December 5	Fight Night Round 3	PS3		
December 5	WWE SmackDown! vs. RAW 2007	PSP		
December 5	Castlevania: Portrait of Ruin	DS		
December 6	Ice Age 2: The Meltdown (USA)	Wii		
December 7	Disney's Chicken Little: Ace in Action	WIN		
December 7	Rayman Raving Rabbids (AU)	WIN, PS2, Wii		
December 7	Rayman Raving Rabbids (handheld) (AU)	GBA		
December 7	Star Wars: Lethal Alliance	PSP		
December 7	Yakuza 2 (JP)	PS2		
December 8	Cars (EU)	Wii		
December 8	Happy Feet (EU)	Wii		
December 8	Ice Age 2: The Meltdown (EU)	Wii		
December 8	Rayman Raving Rabbids (EU)	WIN, PS2, Wii		
December 8	Rayman Raving Rabbids (handheld) (EU)	GBA		
December 11	Alien Crush	Wii		
December 11	Disney's Chicken Little: Ace in Action	Wii		
December 11	Dr. Robotnik's Mean Bean Machine (Genesis)	Wii		
December 11	Gunstar Heroes	Wii		
December 11	Ice Hockey	Wii		
December 11	Rayman Raving Rabbids (USA)	WIN		
December 12	Blazing Angels: Squadrons of WWII	PS3		
December 12	Fullmetal Alchemist: Dual Sympathy	DS		
December 12	Elebits	Wii		
December 12	Shrek Smash n' Crash Racing	PSP		
December 12	SpongeBob SquarePants: Creature from the Krusty Krab (AU)	Wii		
December 12	Zatch Bell! Mamodo Fury	GCN		
December 13	Mashed	PS2, XB		
December 13	The Legend of Zelda: Twilight Princess	GCN		
December 14	Cars (AU)	Wii		
December 14	Open Season (AU)	DS, PSP		
December 14	Star Wars: Lethal Alliance	DS		
December 15	SpongeBob SquarePants: Creature from the Krusty Krab (EU)	Wii		
December 18	Military Madness	Wii		
December 18	Space Harrier II (Genesis)	Wii		
December 18	Tennis (NES)	Wii		
December 19	Bubble Bobble Evolution	PSP		
December 20	3D Ultra Minigolf Adventures	WIN		
December 20	Novadrome	XB360		
December 21	FlatOut 2	Steam		
December 21	Sonic the Hedgehog (2006) (JP)	XB360, PS3		
December 22	Open Season (EU)	Wii		
December 25	R-Type (TurboGrafx-16)	Wii		
December 25	Street Fighter II: The World Warrior (SNES)	Wii		
December 25	Super Castlevania IV	Wii		
December 25	Super Mario Bros.	Wii		
December 25	ToeJam & Earl	Wii		
December 27	New Rally-X	XB360		
December 29	Ape Escape: Million Monkeys	PS2		

== Video game-based film and television releases ==
Title	Date	Director	Distributor(s)	Franchise	Game publisher	Ref.
Grandma's Boy	January 6, 2006	Nicholaus Goossen	20th Century Fox	—N/a	—N/a	
Silent Hill	April 21, 2006	Christophe Gans	Alliance Atlantis (Canada); Metropolitan Filmexport (France)	Silent Hill	Konami	
Pokémon Ranger and the Temple of the Sea	July 15, 2006	Kunihiko Yuyama	Toho	Pokémon	Game Freak	
Viva Piñata	August 26, 2006	Paul Griffin	4Kids Entertainment	Viva Piñata	Rare	
DOA: Dead or Alive	September 7, 2006	Corey Yuen	Dimension Films	Dead or Alive	Team Ninja	
Dance Revolution	September 16, 2006	Keegan Martin	CBS	Dance Dance Revolution	Konami	
Mega Man Star Force	October 7, 2006	Takao Kato	Xebec	Mega Man	Capcom	
Gekijōban Dōbutsu no Mori	December 16, 2006	Jōji Shimura	Toho	Animal Crossing	Nintendo	

== See also ==
- 2006 in esports
- 2006 in games
