= Improbable (company) =

British technology company

Improbable Worlds Ltd
- Company type: Private
- Founded: 2012 in Barnet, London
- Headquarters: 10 Bishops Square, London, E1 6EG, UK
- Founders: Herman Narula; Peter Lipka; Rob Whitehead
- Key people: Herman Narula (CEO); Dan Odell (CFO); Lincoln Wallen (CTO); John Wasilczyk (GM of Games Content); Joe Robinson (Defence and National Security CEO)
- Industry: Metaverse technology Video games Military technology
- Products: M^{2}; Morpheus; SpatialOS
- Services: B2B metaverse infrastructure; Creative services; Consulting
- Employees: 1000
- Website: improbable.io

Improbable Worlds Limited, commonly known as Improbable, is a British technology company headquartered in London, England. It makes metaverse infrastructure and applications, as well as simulation software for video games and corporate use. In fiscal 2022, Improbable reported revenues of £78 million, compared to £22 million in 2021.

== History ==
=== 2012–2015 ===
Co-founders Herman Narula and Rob Whitehead obtained computer science degrees from Cambridge University at Girton and Robinson Colleges, respectively. They met at Cambridge Computer Labs in the months leading up to Narula's graduation; Narula was specialising in computer vision and Whitehead in graphics. The third co-founder Peter Lipka was a student at Imperial College, London before taking a job as a developer for Goldman Sachs. Narula and Whitehead shared a lifelong interest in video games, with Whitehead boosting his student income by making and selling weapons in Second Life. The three founders would go on to become Improbable's CEO, Chief Product Officer and Chief Operating Officer/Asian CEO, respectively.

The company initially developed a platform to assist video game developers in creating large-scale simulations. This culminated in SpatialOS, a distributed operating system for massive-scale simulations which integrated with major game engines.

Initially, the business was run from Narula's parents' Hertfordshire house, Hyver Hall, through to the end of 2013, with Whitehead moving into the Narula family home. Seed funding came from a $1m Narula family loan and $1.2m from angel investors. Early-stage funders included the Wired journalist David Rowan (the first outside investor), UK VCs Saul and Robin Klein, Acorn Computer co-founder Hermann Hauser, Jawbone co-founder Alex Asseily, Skype co-founder Jaan Tallinn, Transferwise founder Taavet Hinrikus, Amadeus Capital Partners, Conversion Capital and UK tech investor Marcus Exall.

In March 2015, the firm received a $20m Series A investment from Andreessen Horowitz, with Chris Dixon taking a board seat. Other series A investors included Horizons Ventures and Temasek.

The firm partnered with Google in December 2016. SpatialOS was released into open beta in February 2017. The first games built on the technology were Worlds Adrift by Bossa Studios and Lazarus by Spilt Milk Studio.

=== 2016–2019 ===
In 2016 Improbable won a multi-year contract with the US Army to provide war-gaming simulations.

In May 2017 Improbable received $502m in a round of Series B funding, led by SoftBank. At the time, it was the largest ever VC investment in a European technology firm. Softbank's investment was non-controlling, although its managing partner Deep Nishar joined Improbable's board. Andreessen Horowitz and Horizons Ventures made follow-on investments in the same round. Improbable recorded revenue of £7.9m for the 12 months to May 2017, most of which arose from its 2016 US Army deal. In the same year, the firm also received £876,960 funding from Innovate UK.

In 2018, Improbable raised $100m from Chinese internet group NetEase, valuing the firm in excess of $2bn. It also founded an office in Edmonton, Canada, with BioWare's Aaryn Flynn joining as manager for North America.

In 2019 Improbable signed an £11.5m contract with UK Strategic Command and a £2.3m contract with the British Army. In the same year, the firm underwent a terms of service dispute with Unity Technologies, the latter blocking several SpatialOS games. Improbable partnered with Epic Games (makers of the competing Unreal Engine) to create a US$25 million assistance fund to help developers affected by the dispute, which has since been resolved.

Between 2018 and 2020 Improbable made three acquisitions, buying German cloud computing firm Zeuz, American developer Midwinter Entertainment and the UK games company The Multiplayer Guys. The latter two firms would later be sold in line with Improbable's venture building programme.

=== 2020–present ===
Improbable sold its majority stake in Inflexion Games to Tencent in February 2022.

In April 2022 Improbable announced MSquared, a separate entity set up to develop a network of interoperable Web3 metaverses based on the company's Project Morpheus technology. MSquared was announced in a $150m funding round led by Andreessen Horowitz and SoftBank's Vision Fund 2. Additional backers included crypto-native investors such as Digital Currency Group, Ethereal Ventures and CMT.

Improbable has partnered with Yuga Labs, the creators of Bored Ape Yacht Club, on the development of Otherside, a gamified metaverse where users can transform their NFTs into portable characters and assets. Improbable's software powered Otherside's First Trip and Second Trip demos, bringing together crowds of 4500 and 7200 community members respectively.

In October 2022, the company began closing a £100m funding round led by the blockchain company Elrond and valuing Improbable at over $3bn. The Financial Times reported that Improbable expected to reach operating profitability in 2023, following a tripling of revenue to more than $100m in 2022.

In July 2024, Improbable announced financial results for the 2023 fiscal year, reporting a profit of £11 million on revenues of £66 million. The firm reiterated plans to incubate and develop companies for strategic exits. As of 2024, Improbable had investments in seven companies and had divested from its defence business and The Multiplayer Group (MPG), which it sold for £76.5 million.

== Projects ==
=== Project Morpheus ===
In October 2021, Improbable revealed Project Morpheus, a series of ongoing software projects allowing mass scale during gameplay and lower operating costs for massively multiplayer online games and simulations, including esports stadia and virtual concerts in addition to gaming. In January 2022 Venturebeat reported that Improbable had commissioned research into the likely development of the metaverse. The attitudinal study was carried out among 2000 gamers and 800 game developers. Respondents believed that the metaverse was a logical progression of gaming, with over 90% of American and British gamers believing the metaverse will be populated and accessible in the next ten years; 10% of British gamers thought the metaverse would arrive by 2023. In 2024 Improbable co-launched The Victory League, aiming to create a virtual football league where fans may interact directly with sports organisations and players.

=== MSquared ===
In April 2022, Improbable announced MSquared, a network of interoperable Web 3 metaverses based on Project Morpheus. Improbable describes MSquared as a network of interconnected metaverses, aiming to support interoperability among virtual worlds. MSquared is intended to enable scale and interoperability between metaverses on the MSquared network, allowing game developers to create virtual assets such NFTs and other digital objects, and for users to transport these digital assets between worlds. MSquared metaverses will feature decentralised, blockchain-enabled web 3 governance principles, where network communities vote on network decisions. In May 2022 MSquared announced that it would help build and operate The Otherside, a gamified metaverse in which users can turn their NFTs into playable characters and assets which will port to other metaverses on the MSquared network. The Otherside has conducted two large-scale metaverse experiences, known as First Trip and Second Trip, which saw thousands of users interacting in the same real-time 3D world running on Improbable's software.

In June 2023 the company officially launched MSquared, granting access to the first features of its metaverse creation suite. An open-source Metaverse Markup Language (MML) and its accompanying environment, named Construct, were made available to enable content creators to build and experience digital assets and experiences within online worlds. Project partners include Google, Nvidia, Dolby. Other MSquared clients now include Major League Baseball. MSquared has collaborated with Major League Baseball to develop a virtual ballpark using Hawk-Eye camera data.

In October 2024, Improbable announced a devnet launch of its Somnia blockchain, designed to process 400,000+ transactions per second. Somnia, developed under Improbable's Virtual Society Foundation, aims to support large-scale metaverse applications with Ethereum compatibility. In February 2025, Improbable and MSquared announced funding up to $270 million for Somnia and its testnet launch.

=== Gaming ===
Improbable has a portfolio of technology and services to develop and operate various third-party and in-house multiplayer games. This includes an experimental version of Midwinter's Scavengers using Morpheus, which can accommodate 10,000 players simultaneously.

In April 2025, MSquared launched Chunked, an experimental browser-based MMO game, in which game logic and storage are handled onchain, rather than through a conventional server backend.

=== Defense ===
Improbable is a former defence contractor. It spun out its defence business in June 2023.

The division had been responsible for developing large-scale real-life simulation platforms for governments, including for the US Department of Defense and the UK Ministry of Defence. Its software allowed troops to understand battlefield interactions with multiple simulated participants using real-world data on weather, geography and recent warfare. The firm also underpinned the Myridian initiative, a collaboration platform for modelling and simulation research, alongside the Universities of Oxford, Bristol, Leeds, Manchester, Durham and other institutions. The initiative aimed to help governments exploit advances in computational modelling and simulation, data analytics, AI and machine learning. The defence business also featured Skyral, a development platform for synthetic environments in the defence sector.

As part of its pivot to venture building, in June 2023 Improbable announced the sale of its defence division to NOIA Capital. NOIA acquired approximately 70 engineers and modellers, along with the associated business interests and contracts, including those with the Ministry of Defence (MoD) in the United Kingdom.

== The Metaverse Society ==
In May 2023 Improbable launched The Metaverse Society, a think-tank dedicated to exploring the social and economic implications of the metaverse.Its reports include Metaverse Trends: The Next Phase in Scaling the Metaverse, co-published with Enders Analysis.

== List of games ==
- Ion (TBA, for Microsoft Windows and Xbox One) - Cancelled in 2016
- Worlds Adrift (2017 for Microsoft Windows) - Cancelled in 2019
- Mavericks: Proving Grounds (2018 for Microsoft Windows) - Cancelled in 2019
- Seed (TBA, for Microsoft Windows)
- Lazarus (2018, for Microsoft Windows) - Cancelled in 2019
- Scavengers ( Microsoft Windows, cancelled on PlayStation 4 and Xbox One.) Launched in early access in 2021, shut down in 2022 before leaving early access.
- Nightingale (TBA, for PC)
