= Harpinder Singh Narula =

Indian businessman based in the UK (born 1953)

- Born: December 1953 (age 72)
- Occupation: businessman
- Title: chairman of DS Constructions
- Spouse: Surina
- Children: Herman Narula

Harpinder Singh Narula (born December 1953) is a UK-based Indian businessman, the chairman of DS Constructions.

== Career ==
He has been responsible for major construction work in Iran, Libya, and Kuwait.

In 1996, he was the recipient of a National Citizens award from Mother Teresa, for initiatives and innovation in social construction projects.

== Personal life ==
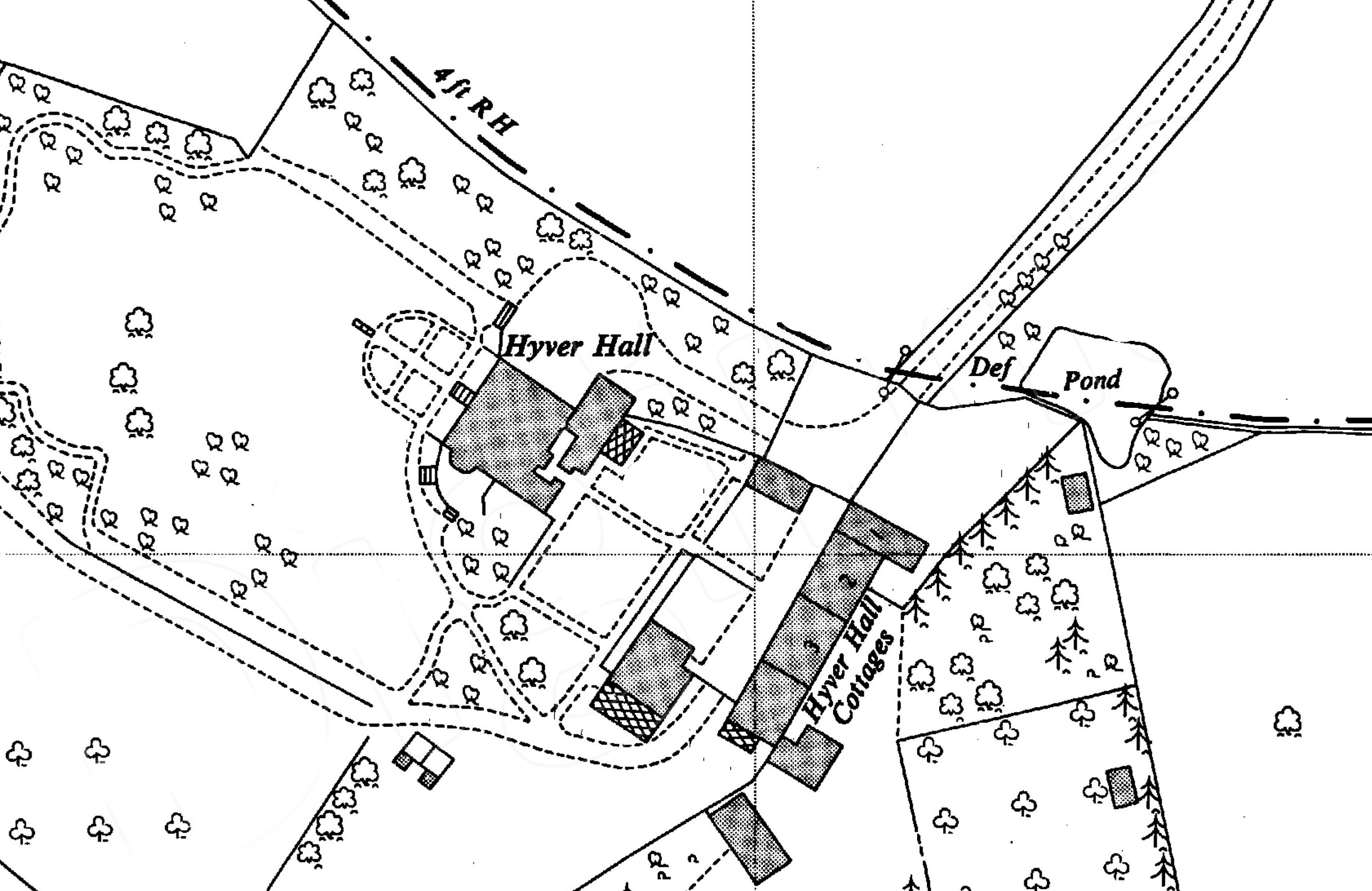
Map of Hyver Hall, c. 1960

He is married to Surina, a society hostess, and they live in Hertfordshire, England. In 1991, he bought Hyver Hall, a grade II-listed mansion in Arkley, Hertfordshire.

His son Herman Narula is CEO of the London tech company Improbable.
