= Seed (upcoming video game) =

Upcoming video game

- Developer: Klang Games
- Engine: Unity
- Platforms: Microsoft Windows; OS X Linux
- Genres: MMO; Sandbox; Simulation Game; Construction and Management Simulation
- Mode: Multiplayer

Seed is massively multiplayer sandbox simulation video game by Klang Games, released in early access on 21st of July 2026. It is a society simulator MMO where your characters, Seedlings, live, work, and die even while you're offline.

According to Klang Games, the game is not connected to, or a remake of, Seed, developed by Runestone Game Development, which closed in 2006.

== Plot ==
Players (Cultivators) are tasked with colonizing a large-scale, exoplanet; Avesta, through collaboration, conflict, and other player-to-player interaction.

== Gameplay ==
Cultivators must manage multiple Seedlings and create their Schedules, allowing them to develop their Society and progress on their own organically. Each AI-controlled Seedling can be given priorities or various tasks for survival. Players can collaborate with one other to form larger societies. These large societies can then form their own governments, rules, or taxes, and eventually, become cities. When a player is logged off, their colonists will still function within the game.

== In-game politics ==
In May 2016, it was announced that the Professor of Law at Harvard Law School, Lawrence Lessig, is working with Klang to create the game's political structure. Professor Lessig is creating a platform where players can choose from different forms of governance to apply to a player colony. The options range from simple forms of government to a monarchy or different forms of complex democracies. Lessig noted that players shouldn't be burdened with political structure until they need it. In addition, Lessig noted that he is not interested in pushing his personal views within the game.

== Development ==
Klang utilizes the cloud-based operating system created by Improbable, SpatialOS, which allows Seed to be a persistent, continuously running simulation, with all Seed game logic running and living on a single shard server. The game's low polygon art style direction is led by 3D animator Eran Hilleli. On 16 September 2025, Seed entered closed beta.

== Reception ==
Seed has been described by Rock, Paper, Shotgun as “'RimWorld but multiplayer or maybe 'The Sims but on another planet where the other Sims families don't like you'.”
