= Gastronaut =

Gastronaut may refer to:

- An alternate name for a gourmet, often used by Keith Floyd
- Gastronaut, a book, two BBC television series, and a YouTube channel by Stefan Gates
- Gastronaut Studios, developer of the video game Small Arms
- Gastronauts, a culinary competition series judged by comedians on the streaming service Dropout
- A food blog on the Houstonia magazine website
