= Herman Narula =

British businessman

- Born: April 1988 (age 38); Delhi, India
- Education: Haberdashers' Aske's Boys' School
- Alma mater: Girton College, Cambridge University
- Occupation: Businessman
- Known for: co-founder and CEO of Improbable
- Title: CEO, Improbable
- Parent(s): Harpinder Singh Narula; Surina Narula

Herman Narula (born April 1988) is a British Indian businessman who is the co-founder and CEO of Improbable.

== Early life and education ==
Narula was born in April 1988, in Delhi, India, before his family moved to the UK when he was three years old. He is the son of Harpinder Singh Narula, who runs DSC Ltd, the family construction business, and Surina Narula, a prominent philanthropist devoted to children's rights and other social and environmental causes. He has two older brothers, Anhad and Manhad, who work for DSC.

He was educated at Haberdashers' Aske's Boys' School, Elstree, and Girton College, Cambridge, where he studied computer science.

== Career ==
Narula met his Improbable co-founder Rob Whitehead while studying computer science at Girton College. Both shared an interest in gaming and a belief that video games held an unrecognised importance in the wider world; both were averse to a career in finance. Narula and Whitehead started Improbable with backing from the Narula family and a group of American and European investors. In May 2017 the company attracted a further $502 million of investment from Softbank, valuing the company $1 billion. In 2020 The Telegraph Tech 100 estimated Narula's net worth at £450 million.

In 2025 Narula claimed that he and other Improbable co-founders have been sanctioned by the Russian government after Improbable's military simulation technology was used in defence of Ukraine.

== Publications ==
Narula is the author of Virtual Society: The Metaverse and the New Frontiers of Human Experience, (Penguin Random House, October 2022).

The book considers the metaverse in the context of the human instinct to derive meaning and purpose from conceptual communities. Narula argues that humans have always sought to live in some form of virtual world. He cites examples from ancient history and contemporary culture, such as the Egyptian concept of the afterlife that gave rise to the pyramids, through to the enduring popularity of movie franchises and fantasy league sports, which for some inhabitants may equal the physical world for fulfilment, trust, and economic trade. Narula believes the metaverse may eventually foster transhumanism, but also that a true brain/computer interface is a distant prospect.

== Personal life ==
Narula lives in the Narula family home in Barnet, North London. He supports Plan International, which advocates for children’s rights and equality for girls. He speaks English and Hindi.

In 2017, he was nominated for The Sunday Times' Business Person of the Year. In 2018 he was named to the Maserati 100 list of notable entrepreneurs; he does not own a car, preferring Uber.
