= Lincoln Wallen =

British computer scientist and CTO

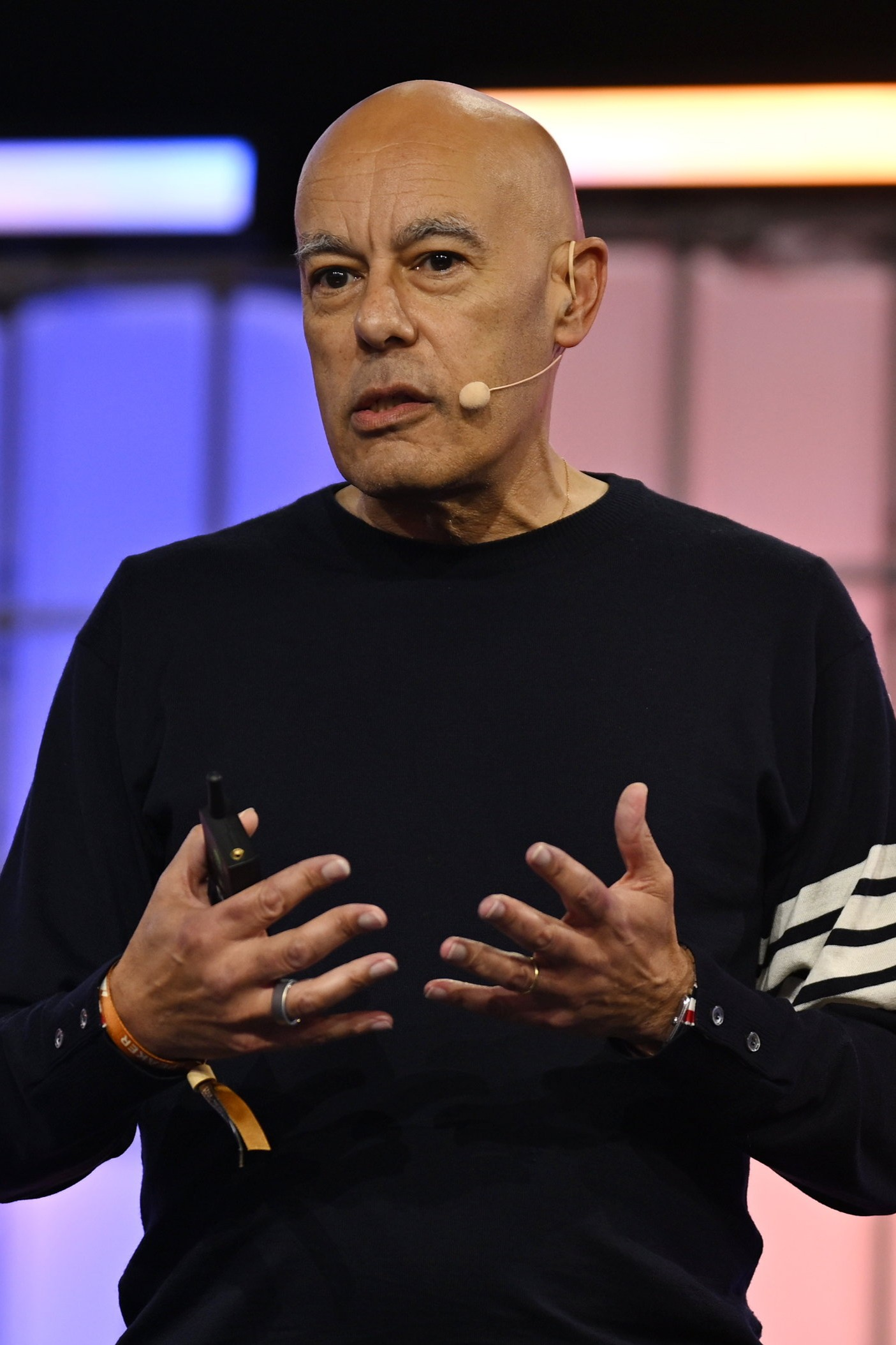
- Wallen in 2025

Lincoln Wallen is a British computer scientist and the Chief Technology Officer (CTO) of Framestore. He is the former CTO of Improbable and DreamWorks Animation.

Wallen received a first-class degree in Mathematics and Physics from Durham University in 1982. He also holds a PhD in artificial intelligence from the University of Edinburgh, supervised by Alan Bundy. He was subsequently an academic at the Oxford University Computing Laboratory.

Wallen later moved into industry, working for the publisher Electronic Arts (EA), where he was CTO of EA Mobile, a business he helped to grow to create a $180 million business over three years. He then served as CTO for the online publishing business of EA internationally. Finally, Wallen joined the Californian film animation company DreamWorks, initially as Head of Research and Development from 2008 and later promoted to the position of CTO in 2012.
