= Decksplash =

- Developer(s): Bossa Studios
- Publisher(s): Bossa Studios
- Platform(s): Microsoft Windows
- Release: Cancelled
- Genre(s): Sports
- Mode(s): Multiplayer

Decksplash is a cancelled skateboarding video game that was being developed by Bossa Studios for Microsoft Windows.

In November 2017, Bossa Studios announced that Decksplash was cancelled after not reaching its intended goal of 100,000 players during a Steam free week.

== Gameplay ==
Decksplash is a team-based skateboarding turf wars video game in which a player controls a physical skateboard without a skater. Players score points by painting the field with their team's colour. The amount of paint a player spreads is dependent on their combo. Combos are determined by any combination of flips, manuals, and grinds.

== Development ==
In January 2017, Bossa Studios announced Decksplash. Rock, Paper, Shotgun compared the game to the likes of Splatoon and Tony Hawk's Pro Skater, while PC Gamer compared it to Rocket League.

In November 2017, Bossa Studios released a free build of the game on Steam. They challenged the community, stating that if 100,000 players downloaded the game during the free week, the game would be released into Steam's early access program, otherwise, the game would be discontinued. A week later, the studio announced the game's cancellation after the player count failed to reach the stated goal. According to PCGamesN only about 36,000 people total tried the game during their free week, with no more than 464 playing it at any given time.
