= I Am Bread =

2015 video game

- Developer: Bossa Studios
- Publisher: Bossa Studios
- Engine: Unity
- Platforms: Windows; OS X; PlayStation 4; iOS; Android; Xbox One
- Release: Windows, OS X; 9 April 2015; PlayStation 4; 25 August 2015; iOS; 3 September 2015; Android; 13 October 2016; Xbox One; 20 January 2017
- Genre: Platform
- Modes: Single-player, multiplayer

I Am Bread is a platform video game developed and published by Bossa Studios on 9 April 2015. The game was released for Microsoft Windows, OS X, iOS, PlayStation 4, Ouya, Xbox One, and Android. It was removed from Google Play in January 2020. The gameplay involves using various abilities, such as sticking to surfaces, to solve puzzles and reach the toaster. Along the way, players must avoid hazards like dirty floors, knives, and pets.

I Am Bread received mixed reviews upon release, with some praising its uniquely humorous premise and challenging gameplay, while others criticized its controls and repetitive nature.

A sequel, I Am Fish, was released in 2021.

== Gameplay ==
I Am Bread puts the player in control of a slice of bread. The aim of each level is to turn the bread into toast. If the bread, before becoming toast, touches certain objects (e.g. the floor, water, or ants), it will get dirty and the "edibility" meter will go down. To control the bread the player must use the arrow keys or an analog stick. The levels are based on the seven days of the week.

Several expansions have added various features, such as having players play as a baguette bent on destroying any fragile object in the room, a bagel that races around the room, and as a fragile cracker that seeks to find slices of cheese and have them stick to it while avoiding disintegration by repetitive impacts on surfaces. In addition, two other levels were added where the player plays either in zero gravity or as a "bread fighter" facing various fighters and ships made of bakery goods in a parody of Star Wars called Starch Wars. Another bonus level has a slice of bread seeking to find and complete an unfinished sandwich in the refrigerator inside a room with a slumbering Heavy as a crossover with Team Fortress 2.

== Plot ==
Mr. Murton is a therapy patient who had a failed business in the past and a divorced wife. He is distressed over alleged break-ins into his house with the culprit supposedly leaving behind pieces of toasted bread as a taunt or warning. With each scenario, Mr. Murton progressively finds out that the culprit of the disarranged house are sentient slices of a specific bread, and at the end, throws the bread out in the trash and escapes custody from the therapy building. After a slice of bread that escaped the garbage truck causes an explosion at a gas station, another slice of bread confronts Mr. Murton while he is driving away from the scene with the intent of eliminating the bread. Terrified, Mr. Murton suffers from what appears to be a heart attack and faints, resulting in a car crash and Mr. Murton becomes injured and falls unconscious. Some time after the crash, Nigel Burke, a mysterious man with a watch, pulls over and investigates and grabs Mr. Murton off-screen, and in front of the car is a Barnardshire Sign indicating that I am Bread is a prequel to Surgeon Simulator 2013, another game by Bossa Studios.

== Development ==
I am Bread was developed with the Unity engine.

== Reception ==
Reception

Aggregate score
Aggregator	Score
Metacritic	(PC) 60/100 (XONE) 59/100 (iOS) 58/100 (PS4) 51/100

Review scores
Publication	Score
GameSpot	5/10
IGN	7.2/10
PC Gamer (US)	58/100
Hardcore Gamer	2/5

I Am Bread received mixed reception from critics, with PC version receiving a 60/100 Metacritic rating, based on 25 critics, the PlayStation 4 version receiving a 51/100 and the iOS version receiving a 58/100. Most criticism of the game came from the poor controls and camera angles.

PC Gamer writer Jordan Erica Webber gave the game a 58/100 score and commented on the fact that "the game is better played in front of an audience, but there is more available than what someone may see at first glance". Kotaku writer Luke Plunkett said that the game might actually have "some depth beyond just laughing at the bread-walking."

In total, the game sold close to 2 million copies.
