= Azure Dreams =

1997 video game

- Developer: KCET
- Publisher: Konami
- Directors: Kenichirō Horio; Haruhiko Inaba
- Producer: Kazumi Kitaue
- Designers: Kouji Yamada; Keisuke Hattori; Kenichirō Horio
- Writers: Kouji Yamada; Kenichirō Horio
- Composer: Hiroshi Tamawari
- Platforms: PlayStation, Game Boy Color
- Release: PlayStation: JP: November 13, 1997; NA: July 10, 1998; EU: December 1998
- Genre: Role-playing
- Mode: Single-player

Azure Dreams (Note: Known in Japan as Other Life Azure Dreams (Japanese: アザーライフ アザードリームス, Hepburn: Azā Raifu Azā Dorīmusu).) is a dungeon crawler role-playing video game developed by Konami Computer Entertainment Tokyo and published by Konami for the PlayStation. A Game Boy Color game with the same name was developed by Konami Computer Entertainment Nagoya and released two years later. A spiritual sequel, Tao's Adventure: Curse of the Demon Seal, was released on the Nintendo DS in 2005.

== Gameplay ==
The main focus of the game is entering the Tower of Monsters and destroying its denizens, gaining experience, and collecting treasure. The player can also catch monster eggs to hatch into familiars. Each monster has hidden spells, unique traits, and abilities. The game revolves around the Tower of Monsters and the town of Monsbaiya, which the player helps develop. With his acquired riches, Koh can finance the building of a theatre, hospital, racing track, casino, bowling alley, and gym. Some buildings allow the appearance of specific love interests (such as the Hospital making way for Cherrl to appear and the library making Mia available), while others offer minigames and the ability to acquire currency at a faster rate. Koh can also improve the furnishings and decorate his home.

The player is also given the option of pursuing romantic ambitions in Koh's life. There are seven characters that he may develop a relationship with. This relationship-building aspect of the game is absent from the Game Boy Color version.

There are a few differences between the Japanese and American versions of the game; the Japanese version has voiced dialogue for every character, a different title screen, narration for the intro movie, and an angel/cherub which is larger and more animated. The monster book graphics were also redone. The Japanese version has a seahorse-like selector with more colorful elemental bars. The layout of the picture and text is different, with the Japanese version having the monster text off to the right and the stats under the picture. The buttons were also completely changed from the Japanese version.

Every time Koh enters the Tower, he returns to level one; however, any familiars hatched outside the Tower retain their current level. As such, progression through the higher levels of the Tower relies on strengthening the familiars or equipment. Strengthening weapons and shields can be an uphill battle, because the items that add a +1 to their attack or defense are often far outnumbered by Rust Traps, one of the many varieties of randomly generated traps that only become visible once activated. One remedy to this is to use types of equipment that do not rust. Once in the Tower, there are only three ways of exiting it: If Koh "dies" within the Tower, he returns to town but loses all equipment he carried; a familiar can be sacrificed using a specific item found within the Tower, called an Oleem, allowing Koh to escape and keep all of his other equipment; and a Wind Crystal can be found in the Tower that allows escape at any time.

Azure Dreams uses a random map generator: every time Koh enters the Tower of Monsters, the levels are randomly generated so as to make every monster-hunting experience different.

Activity within the main dungeon is turn-based, with one move or attack corresponding to a turn (e.g. when the player takes a step, so do opposing monsters).

== Plot ==
Azure Dreams is set in the desert town of Monsbaiya. The town prospers because of a Monster Tower located over it. A skilled monster tamer named Guy disappears in the tower and is never seen again. His son, Koh, enters the tower when he turns 15 and meets a familiar named Kewne - a monster that can speak to humans. Kewne and Koh embark on a quest to reach the top of the Monster Tower and find the truth about Guy's fate.

== Game Boy Color version ==
Azure Dreams
- Developer: Kcen, Inc. (Konami Computer Entertainment Nagoya)
- Publisher: Konami
- Platform: Game Boy Color
- Release: JP: August 5, 1999; NA: February 2000; EU: 2000
- Genre: Role-playing
- Mode: Single-player

The portable edition more than doubled the number of monsters of the PlayStation version and added a bonus underground dungeon that spanned an extra 100 floors of gameplay, but the town building and dating elements were removed. The battle system was also changed to more resemble Pokémon, with each battle taking place on its own screen instead of on the field.

== Reception ==
Reception

Aggregate score
Aggregator	Score	
Aggregator	GBC	PS
GameRankings	70%	72%

Review scores
Publication	Score	
Publication	GBC	PS
AllGame	N/A	2/5
CNET Gamecenter	N/A	8/10
Electronic Gaming Monthly	N/A	7.75/10 (Note: Three critics of Electronic Gaming Monthly gave the PlayStation version each a score of 8/10, and the other gave it 7/10.)
Famitsu	24/40	29/40
Game Informer	N/A	8/10
GameFan	N/A	86% (Note: In GameFan's viewpoint of the PlayStation version, three critics gave it each a score of 88, 87, and 83.)
GameSpot	N/A	7.3/10
IGN	6/10	7/10
Next Generation	N/A	2/5
Official U.S. PlayStation Magazine	N/A	3/5
RPGFan	N/A	(ADM) 74% (Esq.) 73%

The game received "average" reviews on both platforms according to the review aggregation website GameRankings. Next Generation, however, said of the PlayStation version, "A randomly generated dungeon map might conceivably add to the replay value, but as it is, Azure Dreams will not exactly have many gamers coming back for long." In Japan, Famitsu gave it a score of 29 out of 40 for the same console version, and 24 out of 40 for the Game Boy Color version. Boba Fatt of GamePro said that the PlayStation version "offers unique twists on the RPG formula, but its repetitiveness, poor translation, and frustrating luck-based evolution result in a game that fails to deliver on its potential. Nevertheless, the game is addictive, and the interesting villains and monster training are compelling. It's certainly a rent-first title, but fans of turn-based adventures like Suikoden or Vandal Hearts may find themselves having Azure Dreams (whatever that means)." (Note: GamePro gave the PlayStation version three 4/5 scores for graphics, control, and fun factor, and 3.5/5 for sound.)
