= Tao's Adventure: Curse of the Demon Seal =

2005 video game

- Developer: Konami Software Shanghai
- Publisher: Konami
- Designer: Masashi Ugajin
- Platform: Nintendo DS
- Release: JP: December 22, 2005; NA: March 21, 2006; EU: May 26, 2006
- Genre: Role-playing
- Modes: Single-player, multiplayer

Tao's Adventure: Curse of the Demon Seal (TAO魔物の塔と魔法卵, Tao: Mamono no Tō to Mahō no Tamago; Tao: The Goblin's Tower and the Magical Egg) is a Nintendo DS video game developed by Konami.

== Story ==
The game revolves around a boy named Tao from the island of Bente, who must travel to Mondominio to get a rare monster egg from the monster tower. The seal from the tower has been broken, and monsters have turned all the people of his village into stone. Tao meets a creature named Petcho, who calls himself an "Elite Monster" and follows the main character throughout the game.

The game is a sequel to Azure Dreams, which was released 8 years earlier.

== Gameplay ==
Tao's Adventure follows a very straightforward dungeon-combat system. The majority of the game is spent in the Monster Tower, which consists of 40 floors. Tao ventures through these floors, finding monster eggs and monsters as he goes. While Tao can move free range normally, once an enemy is in sight the game changes its movement system. From here, every action uses 1 turn. For every step that Tao takes or spell that he casts, the enemy is allowed one move also. Players are able to cast spells using the DS touch screen, by drawing runes. This concept was put to similar use in a later DS game titled LostMagic. As Tao progresses through the tower he is able to find Monster Eggs. He must then return to the town to hatch the eggs and the monster inside will join his party. Partner monsters are not directly controlled by the player but are instead controlled by the artificial intelligence. Up to two monsters can be in Tao's party at any time. There is also a Coliseum mode, accessed through the game's main town in which the player uses any of Tao's hatched monsters to fight other monsters. This mode can be used over the DS's wireless multiplayer option. Tao and all creatures obtained in the tower can reach a max level of 50, but their stats can only reach 99. The exception is Straitser, the Bird Demon.

== Reception ==
Reception

Aggregate score
Aggregator	Score
Metacritic	50/100

Review scores
Publication	Score
Electronic Gaming Monthly	4.33/10
Famitsu	29/40
Game Informer	2/10
GamePro	3/5
GameSpot	6.1/10
GameSpy	2.5/5
GameZone	6.5/10
IGN	4/10
Nintendo Power	6/10
X-Play	2/5
Detroit Free Press	2/4

The game received "mixed" reviews according to the review aggregation website Metacritic. In Japan, Famitsu gave it a score of one eight and three sevens for a total of 29 out of 40.

The majority of critical comments lie in the poorly designed mechanics and hackneyed ideas, as well as its failure to produce creative, original use of the Nintendo DS touch screen.
