= Blades of Thunder II =

2006 video game

- Developer(s): InterActive Vision
- Publisher(s): Summitsoft Entertainment
- Platform(s): Nintendo DS
- Release: NA: April 18, 2006
- Genre(s): Combat flight simulator
- Mode(s): Single-player, multiplayer

Blades of Thunder 2, also sold as Battle Hawks 2, is a combat flight simulator game developed by Interactive Visison A/S's Polish studio and published by Summitsoft Entertainment for the Nintendo DS. It was released on April 18, 2006 in North America. It received poor reviews, with GameSpot saying that "There's nothing fun or exciting about flying helicopters in Blades of Thunder II. And considering that's all you do in the game, that's really sad." It is a sequel to 2005 Game Boy Advance game, Blades of Thunder.
