= Bossa Games =

British video game developer

Bossa Studios Limited
- Logo used from 2023 to present
- Formerly: Bossa Studios (2010–2023)
- Type: Private
- Industry: Video games
- Founded: October 2010; 16 years ago
- Founders: Henrique Olifiers; Roberta Lucca; Ric Moore; Imre Jele
- Headquarters: London, England
- Key people: Daniel Clough (studio general manager)
- Products: Surgeon Simulator, I Am Bread
- Number of employees: 40 (2024)
- Parent: Shine Group (2011–2014); Endemol Shine UK (2014–2015)
- Website: bossagames.com

Bossa Studios Limited (trading as Bossa Games since 2023) is a British video game developer based in London. It is known for its comedic, physics-based games Surgeon Simulator and I Am Bread.

== History ==
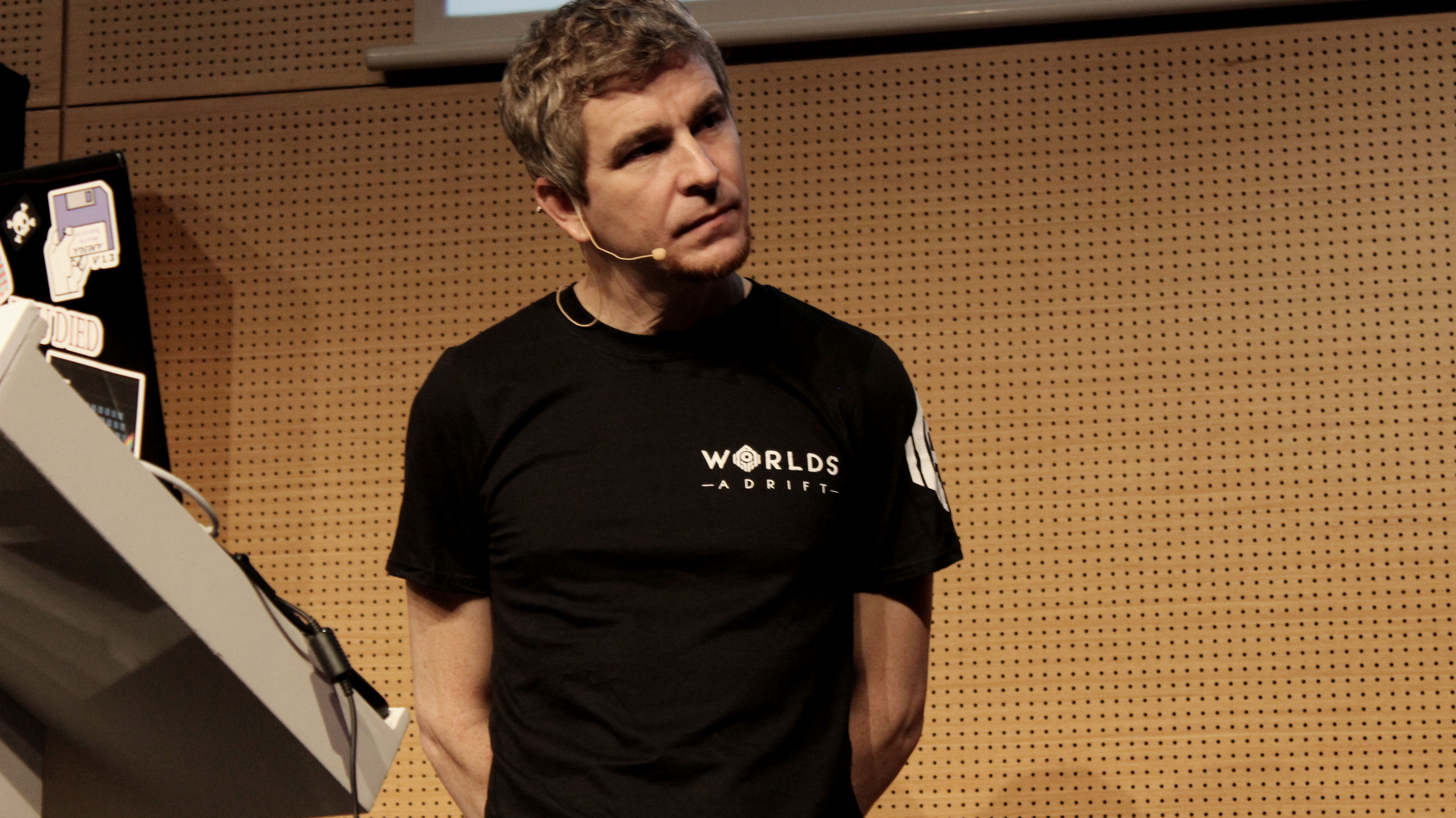
Co-founder Henrique Olifiers in 2018

Bossa was founded in October 2010 by Henrique Olifiers (gamer-in-chief), Roberta Lucca (marketer-in-chief), Ric Moore (technologist-in-chief), and Imre Jele (creator-in-chief). The establishment was formally announced in June 2011, when it had opened its office at the Silicon Roundabout in London, England. Bossa was acquired by the television production company Shine Group in 2011, with the deal announced on 16 September, without disclosing terms. At the time, Bossa had 20 employees, and its first game, Monstermind, launched that same month for the Facebook Platform. Monstermind won the BAFTA award in the "Online – Browser" category in February 2012.

Subsequent games by Bossa were Toy Run and Merlin: The Game, the latter based on the Shine-produced TV series Merlin. Following the commercial success of Surgeon Simulator, Bossa underwent a management buyout process in July 2015 that returned Shine's stake (transferred to Endemol Shine UK after Shine merged with Endemol in December 2014) to the studio's founders.

The company received a US$10 million investment in a series A round in September 2017. Shortly thereafter, they hired former Valve writer Chet Faliszek to lead a new Seattle-based studio for them, working on an unannounced cooperative title.

According to CNBC, Bossa raised between US$10 and 30 million in another investment round in 2019, with NetEase as one of the largest investors in this series, gaining a minority stake in Bossa. Amid complaints against management, Bossa announced it would lay off 10 employees in November 2020.

In August 2022, some of Bossa Studios' intellectual properties, including Surgeon Simulator, I Am Bread, and I Am Fish were sold to TinyBuild for a reported $3 million. The company rebranded to Bossa Games in 2023. In January 2024, Bossa laid off 19 employees, or a third of its total staff. In February 2025, Bossa laid off an undisclosed number of employees and switched its focus to finishing Lost Skies.

== Games ==
=== Games developed ===
Year	Title	Platform(s)	Publisher(s)	Notes
2011	Monstermind	Facebook Platform	Bossa Studios	
2012	Toy Run	Facebook Platform	Bossa Studios	
2012	Merlin: The Game	Facebook Platform	Bossa Studios	
2013	Surgeon Simulator	Linux, macOS, Microsoft Windows, PlayStation 4	Bossa Studios	Originally titled Surgeon Simulator 2013
2014	Surgeon Simulator Touch	Android, iOS	Bossa Studios	Port of Surgeon Simulator
2014	Twelve a Dozen	iOS	Bossa Studios	
2014	Deep Dungeons of Doom	Android, iOS, macOS, Microsoft Windows	Bossa Studios	
2015	I Am Bread	Android, iOS, macOS, Microsoft Windows, PlayStation 4, Xbox One	Bossa Studios	
2015	Spy_Watch	iOS	Bossa Studios	
2015	Outlaw Poker	Android	Bossa Studios	
2016	Surgeon Simulator VR: Meet The Medic	Microsoft Windows	Bossa Studios	Virtual reality spin-off of Surgeon Simulator
2016	Emily: Displaced	macOS, Microsoft Windows	Sega	Part of Help: The Game
2016	Surgeon Simulator: Experience Reality	Microsoft Windows, PlayStation 4	Bossa Studios	Virtual reality version of Surgeon Simulator
2016	Worlds Adrift Island Creator	Microsoft Windows	Bossa Studios	Free creation and playtest tool released alongside Worlds Adrift
2018	Surgeon Simulator CPR	Nintendo Switch	Bossa Studios	Port of Surgeon Simulator
2019	Hogwash	iOS, macOS, tvOS	Bossa Studios	Apple Arcade exclusive
2020	Surgeon Simulator 2	Microsoft Windows, Xbox One, Xbox Series X/S	Bossa Studios	
2021	I Am Fish	Microsoft Windows, Xbox One, Xbox Series X/S	Curve Digital	
2025	Lost Skies	Microsoft Windows, PlayStation 5, Xbox Series X/S	Humble Games	
2025	Pigeon Simulator	Microsoft Windows, Xbox Series X/S	tinyBuild	
2026	What Goes Up	Microsoft Windows, PlayStation 5, Xbox Series X/S	Team17	

=== Games published ===
Year	Title	Platform(s)	Developer(s)
2014	Thomas Was Alone	Android, iOS	Mike Bithell
2017	Purrfect Date	iOS, Microsoft Windows	Team Bae
2019	The Bradwell Conspiracy	iOS, Microsoft Windows, Nintendo Switch, PlayStation 4, Xbox One	A Brave Plan

=== Cancelled ===
- Decksplash
- Worlds Adrift
