= Star Wars: Lethal Alliance =

2006 video game

- European PSP box art
- Developers: Ubisoft Montreal (PlayStation Portable version); Ubisoft Casablanca (Nintendo DS version)
- Publisher: Ubisoft
- Series: Star Wars
- Platforms: PlayStation Portable, Nintendo DS
- Release: PlayStation Portable: NA: December 5, 2006; AU: December 7, 2006; EU: December 8, 2006; Nintendo DS: AU: December 7, 2006; NA: December 12, 2006; EU: December 15, 2006
- Genre: Action-adventure
- Modes: Single-player, multiplayer

Star Wars: Lethal Alliance is an action-adventure game based on the Star Wars franchise. It takes place between the events of Star Wars: Episode III – Revenge of the Sith and Star Wars Episode IV: A New Hope. It was developed by Ubisoft Montreal and Ubisoft Casablanca and released by Ubisoft in December 2006 for the PlayStation Portable and Nintendo DS. Lethal Alliance received a mixed reception.

== Gameplay ==
In Star Wars: Lethal Alliance the player character, Rianna, can perform combination attacks with her droid companion Zeeo.

Star Wars: Lethal Alliance is a third-person action game. It focuses on platforming and shooting mechanics rather than lightsabers and the Force. The player controls a female Twi'lek named Rianna and by extension her companion droid Zeeo. Rianna can perform several acrobatic moves as a means of traversal and defense while in combat. Zeeo enhances Rianna's moves, providing access to control panels, becoming a ride-able platform, and creating a shield to absorb enemy fire.

The two releases of the game, while following the same overarching gameplay design, have a number of differences. The DS version of the game makes heavy use of the touch screen for gameplay, while the PSP version utilizes the handheld's buttons. The PSP version lets the player utilize "stealth" features such as stealth attack moves, sneaking past enemies, wearing disguises, while the DS version has an exclusive weapon called the Dual Cannon. The Dual Cannon can only be used once the player has obtained "Maximum Alliance" between Rianna and Zeeo. Once the Dual Cannon is used, it greatly drops the character's alliance bar, and must be filled to use again.

Both versions utilize Wi-Fi and local area connections for multiplayer gaming. The Sony PSP version features Twi'lek (Rianna's species) vs. Twi'lek, while the Nintendo DS features droid versus droid.

== Plot ==
Having escaped from enslavement by Zarien Kheev, Twi'lek Rianna Saren is a mercenary opposing the Empire. Kyle Katarn of the Rebel Alliance hires her to destroy an Imperial shipment of mirkanite going through a Black Sun warehouse on Coruscant. Rianna is suddenly captured during this operation, but escapes with the help of a droid named Zeeo. Rebel leader Princess Leia later sends Rianna and Zeeo to Alderaan on a new mission to destroy an Imperial ship.

On Alderaan, Rianna and Zeeo make this way through an Imperial base, opposed by stormtroopers and Black Sun guards. Discovering that the Empire is experimenting on the scientists, they blow up both this ship and the lab. They also realize that a final shipment is heading to Mustafar, and Leia sends them after it. Rianna and Zeeo search an Imperial mining facility on Mustafar, eventually finding and destroying the drill. Rianna finds out that Kheev is going to Tatooine, and heads there herself.

Rianna's ship is shot down over Tatooine by Boba Fett in his Slave I. Rianna and Zeeo track down Kheev, who sets a Rancor loose on them in an arena. They kill it, but are captured and brought to Despayre where the Death Star is being constructed. Escaping, they hear Kheev talking to Darth Vader about the construction on the Death Star. Donning a huge robot suit, Kheev attacks Rianna. She kills him, and shows the Alliance that she and Zeeo have uncovered the Death Star.

== Development and marketing ==
The game was revealed in August 2006, as was the partnership between Ubisoft and Lucasfilm. It was announced for the Sony PlayStation Portable and the Nintendo DS. Bertrand Helias, Senior Producer on the game, noted that the team closely with LucasArts to define the game and the story. "They have been excellent collaborative partners, and have also given us the freedom to implement the game mechanics we wanted to develop." The developers split their focus based on the two platforms' advantages. For the PlayStation Portable they focused on higher definition graphics. On the Nintendo DS they focused on interesting ways to make use of the touch screen. David Lodge provides the voice for Kyle Katarn and Boba Fett. Fred Tatasciore voices Darth Vader, and Julianne Buescher provides the voice protagonist Rianna Saren.

Star Wars: Lethal Alliance was released initially on December 5, 2006, for the Sony PlayStation Portable. The Nintendo DS version was released a week later on December 12, 2006.

== Reception ==
Reception

Aggregate scores
Aggregator	Score
GameRankings	(DS) 64.93% (PSP) 64.18%
Metacritic	(PSP) 61/100 (DS) 57/100

Review scores
Publication	Score
Electronic Gaming Monthly	4.83/10
Eurogamer	5/10
Game Informer	6.5/10
GamePro	3/5
GameSpot	(DS) 7.2/10 (PSP) 7.1/10
GameSpy	(PSP) 3/5 (DS) 2.5/5
GameZone	(PSP) 7/10 (DS) 6/10
IGN	(PSP, US) 7/10 (PSP, UK) 6.3/10 (DS) 4.5/10
Nintendo Power	7/10
VideoGamer.com	5/10
The A.V. Club	C
The Sydney Morning Herald	2/5

Lethal Alliance was met with a mixed reception. GameRankings and Metacritic gave it a score of 64.18% and 61 out of 100 for the PSP version, and 64.93% and 57 out of 100 for the DS version.

Reviewers for the PSP version of the game noted that it was unremarkable compared to similar games on the same platform. The critic from GamePro said there "are much better action games out on the PSP than this one, so pass it by unless you're obsessed with Star Wars." GameZone's Angelina Sandoval noted that while the levels have variety and teamwork elements were fun Lethal Alliance is "ultimately [...] a portable action game that could have a lot better."
