= Over G Fighters =

2006 video game

- North American packaging artwork
- Developer: Taito
- Publishers: JP: Taito; WW: Ubisoft
- Platform: Xbox 360
- Release: JP: March 16, 2006; NA: June 27, 2006; AU: June 29, 2006; EU: June 30, 2006
- Genre: Air combat simulation
- Modes: Single-player (Offline), multiplayer (Xbox Live)

Over G Fighters, known in Japan as Over G: Energy Airforce, is a combat flight simulation video game for Xbox 360 developed by Taito and released by Ubisoft in June 2006.

The single-player mode of the game revolves around a group of multinational fighter pilots operating within the fictional Energy Airforce, set in the near future. In response to a wave of global terrorist outbreaks that threaten international security, these courageous pilots take on a leading role in launching a decisive assault against the terrorist threat. Players assume the roles of these pilots and have the opportunity to fly a range of modern fighter jets from both Western and Russian arsenals, as well as European aircraft. Each character possesses distinct attributes and specializes in various aircraft categories such as European, modern, naval, and attack planes. The game's campaign mode offers an extensive experience, immersing players in diverse theaters of war, encompassing dogfights, bombing runs, covert missions, air support, and naval strikes. Notably, Over G Fighters stands out by employing actual names for planes and weapons, and it features authentic real-world locations rather than fictional settings. The game introduces elements of realism, including scenarios involving fuel depletion and weaponry management in expert, hell, or arena modes.

== Multiplayer ==
The multiplayer mode in Over G Fighters is accessible exclusively through Xbox Live, with no support for split-screen local multiplayer. Within the multiplayer component, the game features the following modes:

- Versus: This mode pits two teams of four against each other, with the primary objective of downing enemy aircraft. It's also possible for players to accidentally down friendly aircraft.
- Arena: In this mode, four teams of two compete against each other, with the task of destroying the main bases of opposing teams. While the focus is on targeting enemy main bases, players can engage in combat with both enemy and friendly aircraft.

== Reception ==
Reception

Aggregate score
Aggregator	Score
Metacritic	49/100

Review scores
Publication	Score
Edge	4/10
Electronic Gaming Monthly	4.33/10
Eurogamer	4/10
Famitsu	28/40
Game Informer	5/10
GameRevolution	D
GameSpot	5.9/10
GameTrailers	6.7/10
IGN	6.1/10
Official Xbox Magazine (US)	5/10
X-Play	2/5
Detroit Free Press	1/4
The Sydney Morning Herald	2/5

The game received "generally unfavorable reviews" according to the review aggregation website Metacritic. Critics took issue with several facets of the game, resulting in the overall negative reception. In Japan, however, Famitsu gave it a score of one eight, two sevens, and one six for a total of 28 out of 40.
