= Worlds Adrift =

- Developer(s): Bossa Studios
- Publisher(s): Bossa Studios
- Engine: Unity
- Platform(s): Microsoft Windows
- Release: Cancelled
- Genre(s): MMO sandbox
- Mode(s): Multiplayer

Worlds Adrift was a massively multiplayer sandbox video game, set in a massive world that is permanently changed by players' actions. Developed and published by Bossa Studios, the game entered early access on PC through Steam in mid-July 2017. Following the conclusion of the "End of the world" in-game event, Worlds Adrift was discontinued on July 26, 2019, by Bossa Studios, who cited the game being no longer commercially viable as the reason for its shutdown.

== Gameplay ==
Players could explore the game's vast open world of floating islands, where all in-game objects have their own weight and real-time physics. Worlds Adrift allowed the player to harvest resources and free-build an airship of any size and shape to traverse the world. Due to the game's focus on physics, features of the ship, such as the number and placement of hull material, propulsion systems and where the player stood on the ship in flight, would have an effect on the ship's handling, fuel consumption and speed. Ships were constructed by creating a "ship frame" using an in-game program called "3DS Shipmax," then attaching various parts to the frame once it is built. The various floating islands present in the game that could be explored were created by players in an external software engine called Worlds Adrift Island Creator that came bundled with the game itself and could be installed as a separate program. Bossa Studios had hinted at the presence of a planetary core miles beneath the orbiting clouds, but any player attempting to travel towards this would die long before coming close to anything resembling a core.

== Plot ==
The game's plot was fragmented and incomplete with tiny snippets of background information about the world and its history being learned from scanning various in-game objects. The game hints that the floating islands distributed throughout the game were once part of a planetary crust, but a cataclysm shattered the planet into multiple islands that floated through the atmosphere. The islands float due to an "Atlas Crystal" that is embedded in the islands' impenetrable rock. Atlas crystals were minerals once mined by the ancient precursor civilisation referenced in Worlds Adrift's lore and were valued for their anti-gravity properties. A previous race that built the various in-game ruins is hinted at, but there was no contact between the players and any surviving members of this precursor civilisation.

== Development ==
Worlds Adrift was announced by Bossa Studios on December 19, 2014, by Bossa Studios' founder Henrique Olifiers. The concept for the game came from a game jam event.

The game's complex persistent world is run by a cloud-based operating system called SpatialOS created by a UK-based company named Improbable. SpatialOS allows a simulated world, with a day and night cycle, to be inhabited by millions of complex entities in a real-time environment. The program's "worlds" can span massive regions of digital space (processing power per cubed kilometer ratio), contain millions of individually simulated entities with complex behavior, and run across thousands of servers in the cloud.

Development ceased on July 26, 2019, due to being "no longer commercially viable" with a lack of interest from new players.

== Reception ==
Worlds Adrift was once referred to as "The Minecraft for a new generation" by Angus Morrison of Edge magazine. Brandin Tyrrel at IGN also cited the game as "Worlds Adrift is one of the most ambitious physics games I've ever seen."

The game was nominated for the "Creativity" and "Heritage" awards at The Independent Game Developers' Association Awards 2018.
