= Hyver Hall =

Listed building in Barnet, London, England

Coordinates: 51°38′24.16″N 0°15′6.85″W

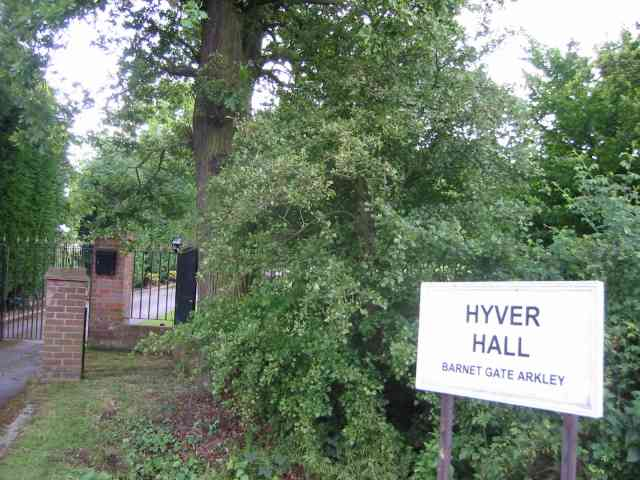
Entrance to Hyver Hall

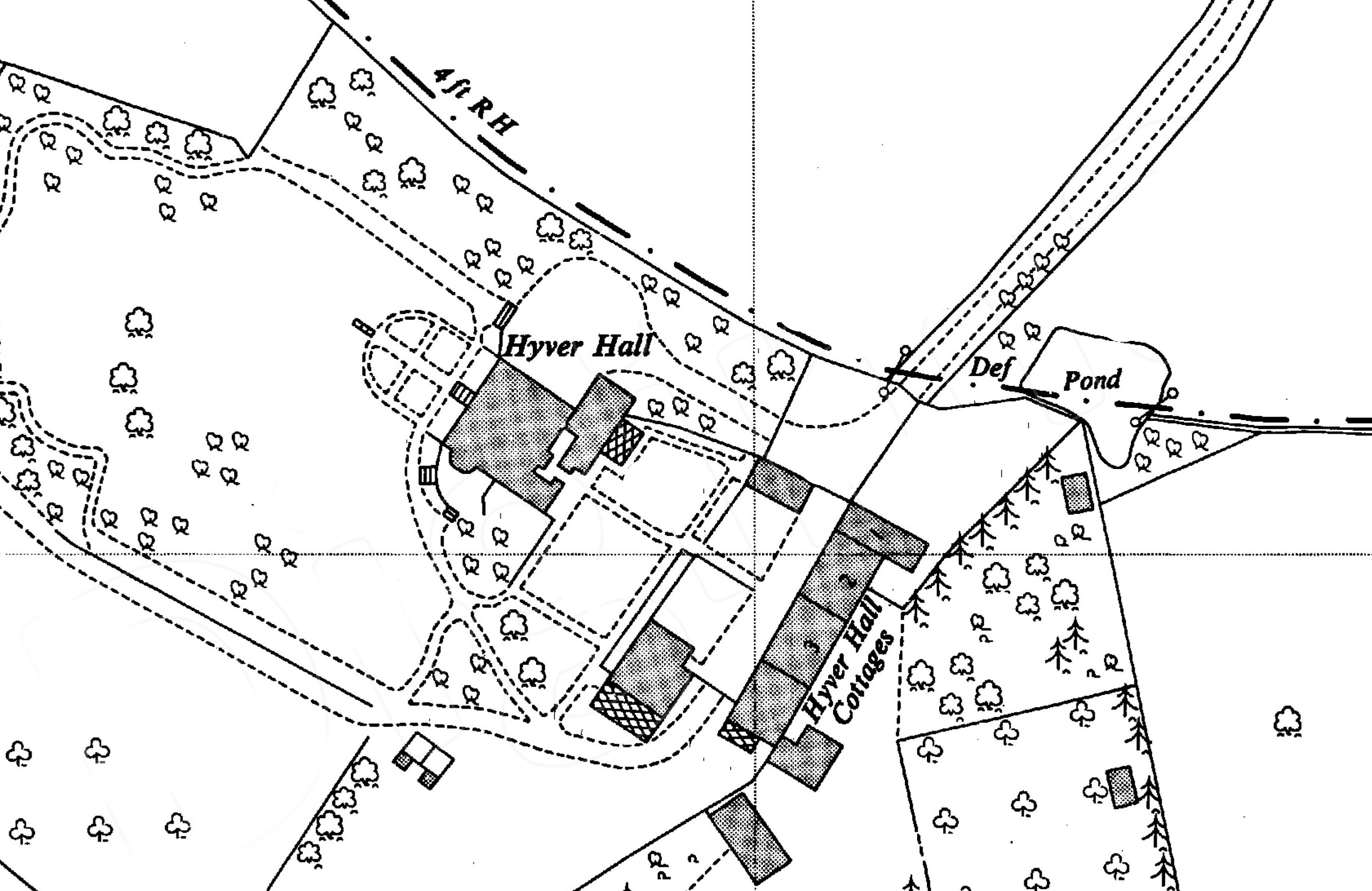
Map of Hyver Hall, c. 1960

Hyver Hall is a grade II listed house in Barnet Road, to the west of Barnet Gate and Arkley, in the London Borough of Barnet, England.

It was purchased by Harpinder Singh Narula in 1991.
