= Small Arms (video game) =

2006 video game

- Developer: Gastronaut Studios
- Publisher: Microsoft Game Studios
- Platform: Xbox 360 (XBLA)
- Release: November 22, 2006
- Genre: Versus fighting game
- Modes: Single-player, multiplayer

Small Arms is an action video game, developed by Gastronaut Studios and published by Microsoft Game Studios. It was released for the Xbox 360 on November 22, 2006 at Xbox Live Arcade.

== Gameplay ==
Small Arms is a hybrid platform, fighting and shoot 'em up video game, featuring anthropomorphic animals and super-deformed people, with ranged weapons. The gameplay can be compared to Super Smash Bros., Power Stone, Contra and Metal Slug.

Similar to Geometry Wars, the player controls characters' movement with the left analog stick, and aims weapons with the right analog stick, which allows 360-degree aiming. Each weapon has primary and secondary modes, which the player can use with the right and left triggers, respectively. The player can also make characters jump or dash with the face buttons.

Small Arms features four different single-player modes: Mission Mode, which pits the player against computer-controlled players in sequence; Training Mode, which teaches the player how to play the game; Challenge Mode, where the player faces an endless stream of opponents; and Shooting Range, where the player must shoot moving targets to score points. Small Arms also features competitive multiplayer for up to four players or bots, either offline or online via Xbox Live.

Levels are visualised in full 3D although the players can only move in one two-dimensional plane. Several levels have special quirks to them: the "Bullet Train" level slowly forces the players to move across the length of the train; and the "Sewer" level has a pit in the middle of the map, which closes shut and fills with poisonous gas. Small Arms launched with eight maps, and two more maps were available as downloadable content bundled with the Ivar and Gullarp character download. The two maps that are included with the downloadable content are "Iceberg" and "Village".

== Characters and weapons ==
Small Arms has 12 default characters, eight of which are initially available:

Default characters:

- Fox Claw: a runaway mutant who used to be her clan's deadliest female ninja, armed with a katana*
- Lord Peet: a chivalry fanatic, armed with a crossbow*
- Marky Kat: a cat former mercenary and now illegal arms trader and 3rd richest mutant cyborg, armed with a chaingun*
- Pector El Pollo: a former Mexican mutant wrestler, armed with a flamethrower and molotov cocktails
- Mr. Truffles: a famous mutant assassin, armed with a sniper rifle and land mines
- Tyrone: a dinosaur who was raised in a research facility in the Antarctic Circle, armed with an ice weapon*
- Unit 51: an elite soldier of the Space Marines, armed with a lightning weapon
- Zöe: a 22nd-century intergalactic female pop-star, armed with a plasma weapon

Unlockable characters:

- Billy Ray Logg: a mutant tree, armed with a buzzsaw weapon
- ISO-7982: a mad killer robot, armed with an oversized pistol doubling as a missile launcher
- Mousey McNuts: a 19th-century street urchin, armed with akimbo submachine guns
- Professor Von Brown: a doctor of transcendental psychology, armed with psionic powers

*available in trial version

Two new characters were made available as downloadable content from the Xbox Live Marketplace on June 6, 2007: Ivar, and Gullarp. Each character has four different costume colours and a unique weapon (except downloadable ones). However, these weapons can be exchanged for other characters' weapons during gameplay.

== Reception ==
Reception

Aggregate score
Aggregator	Score
Metacritic	73/100

Review scores
Publication	Score
Eurogamer	6/10
GameSpot	6/10
IGN	8.2/10
Jeuxvideo.com	7/20
Official Xbox Magazine (US)	7.5/10
TeamXbox	7.1/10
X-Play	3/5

The game received "mixed or average reviews" according to the review aggregation website Metacritic.

== Other media ==
A mobile version of the game was seemingly in development after the release of the Xbox 360 version. This version was never announced, however, and the only surviving footage online is a short video on YouTube. It had gameplay which was similar to the console version; however, the graphics had been changed to a more pixelated style to fit on portable devices.
