= LostMagic =

2006 video game

- US box art for DS version
- Developer: Garakuta Studio
- Publisher: JP: Taito; Ubisoft
- Director: FANG
- Producers: Naoto Tominaga; Osamu Inoue
- Designers: Kōjirō Modeki; Yuichi Tanzawa
- Programmers: Takashi Seguchi; Yu Okano; Kazunori Yamamoto
- Artists: Hisaya Souda; Yoshiharu Satō; Takafumi Funamoto
- Writer: Yuichi Tanzawa
- Platform: Nintendo DS
- Release: JP: January 19, 2006; NA: April 25, 2006; EU: April 27, 2006; AU: April 28, 2006
- Genres: Role-playing, real-time strategy
- Modes: Single-player, multiplayer

LostMagic (ロストマジック, Rosuto Majikku) is a real-time strategy role-playing video game developed by Taito for the Nintendo DS system. It supported the Nintendo Wi-Fi Connection.

== Gameplay ==
The gameplay of LostMagic primarily features a magic system and the use of captured monsters as soldiers. Since mages, such as the one the player controls, cannot physically attack, they rely on magic to do so. The player can use various magical spells by drawing runes on the DS's touch screen; drawing them accurately results in more powerful spells. Some runes are easier to draw than others, while drawing runes slowly can leave the player vulnerable to attack. There are eighteen different runes and six elements of magic: fire, water, earth, light, dark, and wind. Early on in the game, the player gains the ability to fuse runes, such as combining Fire 2 and Water 1 to make an ice explosion. Near the end of the game, the player gains the ability to fuse 3 runes together. When used in combination, the first rune usually determines the effect of the spell and the others determine its elemental type. For example, any Duo Rune starting with Fire 2 will be an explosion. In total, there are 396 different spells.

There are a total of 62 monsters that the player can collect using certain spells, which they can bring out to fight for them in later battles. Player-controlled monsters fight with the same artificial intelligence as computer-controlled enemies, and the player can give movement commands by selecting one or a group of monsters with the stylus. Monsters can be leveled up to level 50; leveling up increases their stats, which can also be increased using "buff-up" spells and items.

The player can also equip them with items that increase a stat by a percentage. Lower level items are usually found at the beginning of the game, while higher level items are found towards the end of the game and are rarer than others.

=== Multiplayer ===
In multiplayer, players could fight in "Free Duels" using preset character settings and "Duels" using saved character data, through which they could gain experience points and learn new spells from other players.

Using Nintendo Wi-Fi Connection, players could fight using a preset character at Lvl 40 or their character and monsters from the Story Mode, through which they could gain experience.

Online gaming groups, also known as clans, were popular in the Wi-Fi mode of LostMagic during its early months., but most died off as a result the game lost popularity.

With single-card play, in which case only one person needed to own the game, the second player could only download a demo of the game. In multi-card Play, players fought each other for experience to level up using their Story Mode teams. People fought in local multi-card play were automatically added to each other's Wi-Fi Friend lists.

== Plot ==
The game's protagonist is the young mage named Isaac, whose father Russell gave him the Wand of Light, one of seven powerful wands which allows him to cast magic and capture and control monsters. After being separated from his parents when he was young, he was raised by a forest witch who taught him the arts of magic.

== Reception ==
Reception

Aggregate score
Aggregator	Score
Metacritic	68/100

Review scores
Publication	Score
Edge	5/10
Electronic Gaming Monthly	5/10 (Note: Three critics of Electronic Gaming Monthly gave the game each a score of 5/10, 4/10, and 6/10.)
Eurogamer	6/10
Famitsu	30/40 (C+A) 26/40
Game Informer	6/10
GameRevolution	C
GameSpot	7.9/10
GameSpy	3.5/5
GameZone	8.2/10
IGN	6.5/10
Nintendo Power	8/10
Nintendo World Report	6.5/10
RPGamer	3/5
RPGFan	90%

The game received "average" reviews according to the review aggregation website Metacritic. In Japan, Famitsu gave it a score of 30 out of 40 (individual reviews: 9/7/8/6), while Famitsu Cube + Advance gave it a score of 26 out of 40 (individual reviews: 7/7/6/6). GamePro said that the game "strives to accomplish something innovative and enjoyable, [but] it falls short in its implementation, resulting in a game that frustrates and disappoints." (Note: GamePro gave the game three 3.5/5 scores for graphics, sound, and fun factor, and 4/5 for control.)

== Sequels ==
A spiritual successor, Takt of Magic (タクトオブマジック, Takuto obu Majikku), also developed by Taito but published by Nintendo, was released for the Wii in Japan on May 21, 2009. Its protagonist, Orville, was included as a spirit in Super Smash Bros. Ultimate. A sequel, Lost Magic: Concerto for the Fallen (ロストマジック ～精霊の協奏曲～, Rosuto Majikku Seirei no Kyōsōkyoku) was made by Taito for mobile phones.
