= Gloria Union =

2011 video game

Gloria Union: Twin Fates in Blue Ocean
- Developer: Sting
- Publisher: Atlus
- Producer: Hikaru Yasui
- Artists: Hiroshi Konishi; Eiko Tameshige; Sunaho Tobe
- Composer: Shigeki Hayashi
- Series: Dept. Heaven
- Platforms: PlayStation Portable; Android; iOS; Nintendo Switch
- Release: PlayStation Portable: JP: June 23, 2011; Android, iOS, Nintendo Switch: JP: March 18, 2021
- Genre: Tactical role-playing game
- Mode: Single player

Gloria Union: Twin Fates in Blue Ocean (Note: Japanese: グロリア・ユニオン, Hepburn: Guroria Yunion) is a tactical role-playing game for the PlayStation Portable, developed by Sting Entertainment and published by Atlus. It is a spinoff to Yggdra Union, and including Yggdra Unison and Blaze Union is the fourth installment in the Union subseries to Dept. Heaven. It was unveiled in Famitsu magazine in late March 2011 and released in June. A remastered version for mobile platforms and the Nintendo Switch was released in March 2021 in Japan.

== Story ==
Thousands of years ago, a great kingdom called Euforia flourished making use of a power source known as "Will".

Through the centuries, Euforia developed many customs based on the use of Will, but when one day they realized that their civilization would soon come to an end, they poured all their Will into crystals in order to leave a record of their culture behind. After this, Euforia sank to the bottom of the ocean.

In the present day, with the ocean now taking up over half of the world, the seas became populated with many pirates. Those pirates, hearing the legend of the crystals, began to search the ocean for clues to their whereabouts.

Among those pirates was one young boy dreaming of greatness.

== Characters ==
=== Allies ===
Ishut (イシュト, Ishuto)
Voiced by: Hiro Shimono
The protagonist, a hot-blooded youth who dreams of becoming a famous pirate. He wields a blade nearly the size of his body, and travels with his childhood friend Pinger in search of treasure. Put kindly, he is naive; more frankly, he is immature and bad at making judgments. Ishut is not particularly good at dealing with his own emotions. Although he has no memory of it, Ishut is from Lukia, and alongside his brother Ashley is the reincarnation of the ruler of Euforia, giving him the power to unlock the special Euforian cards from the lost crystals. His unit class is "Innocent".

Pinger (ピンガー, Pingaa)
Voiced by: Emiri Katou
A cait sith and Ishut's childhood friend, she has a pair of black cat ears and tail. Despite being much calmer and more intelligent than Ishut, she still follows his lead rather than vice versa, calling him "Aniki". Pinger was not born as a beastman; rather, she was a human street urchin kidnapped and experimented on by Tracey, who abandoned Pinger upon discovering that beastmen naturally existed. After this incident, Pinger was rescued from Velgas' bullying by Ishut and has followed him ever since. She enjoys making cat puns, and tends to end her sentences with meowing noises. Her unit class is based on the Ax Battler generic units.

Elisha (エリーシャ, Eriisha)
Voiced by: Shizuka Ito
One of the members of the Gloria pirate band, who is famous for dual-wielding pistols. She works as the captain's assistant and has problems communicating with Ishut, annoyed by the way he fools around with all the girls. She is interested in him, but Ishut does not notice that. She is seventeen years old, but because of how long she's spent traveling the world she tends to seem more mature than her years. Elisha is advertised as a tsundere character. Her unit class is "Gunner".

Ruru (ルルゥ, Ruruu)
Voiced by: Kana Hanazawa
A mysterious woman attempting to guide Ishut to Euforia. She has a very airy personality and wields a staff. Sometimes she does things that seem strange to other people, such as eating crushed historical artifacts, and tends to act younger than she looks, which takes the rest of the party off guard. She is knowledgeable about and can sense the power of Will. Unbeknownst to Ruru herself, she is the artificial human Symphonia, and is unable to access her full power and knowledge because she is in safety mode. Her unit class is "Uranus".

Zazarland (ザザーランド, Zazaarando)
Voiced by: Keiji Fujiwara
Elisha's father, who is actually the captain of the Gloria band. While a steadfast leader often referred to as "old man" by his crew, his freewheeling lifestyle also causes him to be rather aimless and his drinking habit makes his daughter worry. Zazarland was once a general in the Lukian army, but he left to become a pirate after a certain incident seventeen years ago. His unit class is "Captain" and he wields an axe in battle.

Locomoco (ロコモコ, Rokomoko)
Voiced by: Ai Nonaka
A young magical girl who came to this world from Yumira, which she calls the "country of magic", in search of Euforia's secret weapon, Symphonia. She does not seek it to take it, but rather because she just wants to see it after discovering the legends of Euforia. Despite her great childishness, her magical ability and knowledge are top class. Her costume and magic have a candy motif.

Fiebee (フィービー, Fiibii)
Voiced by: Ayaka Shimizu
An Undine from Chantier who came to foreign waters in order to find a way to help her polluted homeland. She was raised to be a knight from a youthful age, and believes she was born solely to help defeat Chantier's enemy, the Lukia Empire. Because of her youth, Fiebee has never actually seen her country in its golden age. She is advertised as a yandere character.

Raspberry (ラズベリー, Razuberii)
Voiced by: Minori Chihara
A vampire who left her world in search of an escaped criminal. Though she is only sixteen years old, she is so elite that she is allowed to move on her own. The wings on her back are fakes and simply tools to help her fly, which she was given when she was assigned her task. Raspberry acts as a psychopomp and helps to oversee dead sinners who are working to repent for their crimes.

Minesota Grey (ミネソタ・グレイ, Minesota Gurei)
Voiced by: Shinji Kawada
A lance-wielding archaeologist researching Euforia. He is a stickler for manners, but has a bad temper. His name is a reference to Indiana Jones.

Eater (イータ, Iita)
Voiced by: Minori Chihara
A traveling minstrel with a split personality that changes based on the time of day. She claims to be searching for powerful men to inspire her. Her songs recall the heroics of Gulcasa and his men, who she traveled with in Blaze Union.

Pamela (パメラ, Pamera)
Voiced by: Ai Nonaka
A witch from Yumira who travels various worlds in order to research a number of mysteries. She is the Dept. Heaven series mascot and has appeared in every Dept. Heaven episode and Union series game since Yggdra Union.

Anne Cormack (アンヌ・コーマック, Annu Koomakku)
Voiced by: Aki Nakajima
An infamously greedy female pirate who uses her sex appeal as a weapon. She first appears attempting to collect the bounty on Ishut, and becomes rivals with Elisha.

Yggdra (ユグドラ, Yugudora)
Voiced by: Mai Nakahara
The leader of the Fantasinia Traveling Band, a group of bounty hunters. She closely resembles the Yggdra of Yggdra Union and Blaze Union, and wields the Centurio Buster, a massive gatling gun. She is not the same Yggdra as the one in the rest of the series, but is rather an analogue with a similar past. Her unit class is "Avenger".

Gangr (ガング, Gangu)
Voiced by: Naoya Nosaka
A small yellow robot that was created as a prototype to Symphonia and sent to guard the ruins that hide the earth crystal. He was thrown into the sea by the invading Lukia military, and joins the party after being fished out of the water by Ishut. Gangr is only capable of speaking the syllables of his own name when not chanting card incantations, but Ruru can understand him.

Kamuru (カミュル, Kamyuru)
Voiced by: Ryouta Asari
A young but promising Lukian knight who joins Gloria to save his own life after accidentally disgracing himself. He is ordinarily shy and polite, but always shouts at the top of his lungs on the battlefield so that he will not lose heart. Kamuru has a strong admiration for Elisha.

=== Enemies ===
Blackmore (ブラックモア, Burakkumoa)
Voiced by: Naoya Nosaka
Leader of a group of pirates called the "Black Fang" that are enemies to the Gloria band. He is the primary antagonist for the first three chapters of the game.

Velgas (ベルガス, Berugasu)
Voiced by: Anri Katsu
A childhood rival to Ishut and Pinger, who has known Ishut for ten years. He resents Ishut for being naturally strong and not having to resort to dirty tricks to win, and joins Black Fang to get a leg up on him. Velgas has a crush on Pinger that he is only able to express through bullying her.

Tracey Cormack (トレイシー・コーマック, Toreishii Koomakku)
Voiced by: Eri Gouda
The leader of the Leverage Merchants, a woman with heterochromia. She deals in "rarities" and uses alchemy to artificially create things that do not naturally exist in order to sell them. Her powers are great enough even to raise the dead. Tracey is Anne's older sister.

Rogan (ローガン, Rougan)
Voiced by: Tsuguo Mogami
The escaped undead criminal Raspberry is searching for, who was a famous pirate in life. He desires to live as a pirate again.

Gariored (ガリオレッド, Garioreddo)
Voiced by: Kosuke Takaguchi
Prime Minister of the Lukia Empire. He believes that power itself is justice, and even uses the young Emperor as his tool to accomplish his means. He is the wire-puller behind the Euforia Plan. Wears glasses and wields a massive gun-sword.

Melanie (メラニー, Meranii)
Voiced by: Aki Nakajima
One of the generals of the Lukia military, known as the "God of Protection". Wears her red hair in a braid similar to Aegina's.

Garm (ガルム, Garumu)
Voiced by: Tsuguo Mogami
One of the generals of the Lukia military, known as the "Garm of the Divine Lance". A very reliable man. A knight who carries a shield with the device of a wolf's head and front leg.

Ashley (アシュレイ, Ashurei)
Voiced by: Hiro Shimono
The youthful emperor of Lukia, actually Ishut's older twin brother. He is used as a puppet by Gariored, and due to Gariored's strict training and abuse, Ashley has lost the ability to feel and express most emotions. He resents Ishut's freedom and has a strong desire to become happy.

Enryetta (エンリエッタ, Enrietta)
Voiced by: Mai Nakahara
The president of United Elmare, a group of nations who have made an alliance to defeat Lukia. Noting that peace can often only be achieved through sacrifice, she has determined to choose those sacrifices herself for the sake of a peaceful world. Enryetta appears to be personally acquainted with both Gariored and Zazarland.

Giselle (ジゼル, Jizeru)
Voiced by: Ayaka Shimizu
The queen of Chantier, the Undine nation. Despite having fought with Lukia for a hundred years, she has recently begun to lose the will to fight after having watched her homeland become polluted with war debris. Giselle eventually joins Elmare.

Ajo Grafor (アジョー・グラフォー, Ajou Gurafou)
Voiced by: Ryouta Asari
A mad scientist who is using human experimentation to try to create functional cyborgs. His favorite creation is the Ruru Mk-II, a robotic, emotionless doppelganger of Ruru.

Kyra (キーラ, Kiira)
Voiced by: Shizuka Ito
The sole survivor of Euforia's destruction, who has been kept in a dormant state for almost a millennium. Kyra has a masculine style of speech, a feminine style of dress, and is both referred to and treated systematically as an intergendered character. Kyra wields a scythe and appears to be connected to this era's Tactics Cards.

== Gameplay ==
Overworld screenshot of an early battlefield featuring Ishut and Pinger. Note the time/weather display.

Like Blaze Union before it, Gloria Union inherits the same card system, turn-based movement, and real-time union combat used in Yggdra Union; it also keeps the Ax Battler class which debuted in Blaze Union.

However, Gloria Union also introduces a number of new cards and classes, as well as new system functions.

Problems with Blaze Union's battle display (such as character statistics being hidden behind speech bubbles during Skill usage) have also been rectified, with Skill-relevant statistics now being displayed at the top of the screen during use.

According to the newly released PV, there will be 48 Tactics Cards, including several cards newly created for this game. Comparatively, Yggdra Union featured 37 cards, while Blaze Union had 39.

In certain game maps, the Gloria pirate ship itself is available as a mobile cannon battery and piece of crossable terrain.

Gloria Union also contains a hidden feature in certain battlefields which allows the player to swap the formation style of units from male to female and vice versa regardless of their actual gender. A special item is required to do so. Intergendered character Kyra's personal formation overlays the male and female formations, creating a Union radius of 16 squares rather than the usual 8.

=== Weather ===
In addition to the day/evening/night time system, Gloria Union also features three types of weather: Sunny, Rainy, and Foggy. Sunny conditions are the default, whereas rainy weather decreases the power of units aligned to fire and gun-using classes. Fog decreases visibility, which results in the Union matrix being smaller, enemy units' manpower becoming indiscernible in battle, and a high chance of units going into Panic when hit with an enemy charge.

=== New Generic Classes ===
In Gloria Union, the bow-using classes "Hunter" and "Assassin" are replaced by gun-wielding classes "Sniper" and "Gunner" respectively. Previously Assassin-only card "Bloody Claw" has been reassigned with the male Sniper units accordingly.

Additionally, the "Bandit" class has been replaced with "Pirates", and the "Fencer" class replaced by "Chaser". Like the female-exclusive "Ax Battler" class that debuted in Blaze Union, a new male-only sword-using class called "Paladin" and a male-only spear class called "Sailor" have been added as well.

=== New Cards ===
Fifteen new cards were created for Gloria Union, fourteen of which have been revealed on the official website

- Tidal Wave (destroys all members of the enemy unit except the Head; usable only by characters with strong Will)
- Volcannon (deals damage and inflicts the Fatal Burn status; usable only by characters with strong Will)
- Grand Spear (deals damage and temporarily lowers enemy GEN; usable only by characters with strong Will)
- Burst Wing (deals damage and lowers enemy accuracy; usable only by characters with strong Will)
- Holy (converts enemy Rage Rate into own unit's power, destroys Skill and Rage gauges; usable only by characters with strong Will)
- Magic Shield (nullify enemy Skills for the entire turn; usable only by Staff-wielding female characters)
- Fusillade (deals great damage and knocks out enemy Head; usable only by Elisha)
- Coalesce (combines all subordinate units' power into Head—compare Genocide; usable only by Ruru)
- Tyrant (powers up Head but renders her uncontrollable, breaking Skill gauge—compare Genocide; usable only by Pinger)
- Dreadnought (deals great damage; usable only by Zazarland)
- Salvation (revives all unit members in exchange for knocking out the Head; usable only by Minnesota)
- Meteor (deals great damage to either own unit or enemy; usable only by Locomoco)
- Crucifixion (temporarily stops time for enemy unit; usable only by Raspberry)
- Trickster (uses enemy's Skill against them; usable only by Tracey)
- Megiddo (destroys all enemy units—compare Crusade; usable only by Gariored and Ashley)

To make room for the new cards, all character-exclusive cards used in the previous games are unused except for Coma Karma, Judgment Zero, and Insanity.

== Development ==
Gloria Union shares its producer and many other team members with Blaze Union, although Radiant Historia's Hiroshi Konishi and Dokapon Kingdom's Eiko Tameshige are handling the character art for this release rather than Rui Kousaki or Satoko Kiyuduki.

Much like Blaze Union before it, Gloria's development was kept secret until its unveiling, unlike Gungnir, which JaJa discussed in its early stages on his blog. 2011 is the third year in which two Sting games have been released in directly consecutive months; 2009 saw the release of Hexyz Force in November and Yggdra Unison in December, and in 2010 the PSP version of Knights in the Nightmare (April) was followed by Blaze Union that May.

A remastered version of the game featuring various graphical and gameplay adjustments titled Gloria Union: Twin Fates in Blue Ocean FHD Edition is planned for a March 18, 2021 digital-only release for iOS, Android and Nintendo Switch platforms in Japan.

== Merchandise ==
Pre-orders of Gloria Union at certain vendors (Fammys, Softmap, Messe Sanoh, Imagine, Gamers, and Medialand) include phone cards with illustrations of Kyra and some of the game's female characters (Pinger, Elisha, Ruru, Ruru, Kyra, and Melanie respectively). In addition to this, preorders at Messe Sanoh's women-oriented vendor include a full set of bromide cards featuring the male cast, a first for the Union series as well as the Dept. Heaven series as a whole.

The game's single-disc soundtrack was released under the SMD itaku label one week after the game's release. Its official strategy guide was printed by Softbank Creative and released on August 3.

=== Soundtrack ===
グロリア・ユニオン オリジナルサウンドトラック
No.	Title	Length
1.	"GLORIA"	0:43
2.	"To the Glorious Sea (栄光の海へ, Eikou no Umi e)"	1:05
3.	"Ancient Euforia (古代ユーフォリア, Kodai Yuuforia)"	1:21
4.	"Tremble of the Battlefield (戦場の戦慄き, Senjou no Wananaki)"	1:45
5.	"To Victory"	2:07
6.	"Depart for the Wide Sea! (大海へ出でよ!, Taikai e Ide yo!)"	1:05
7.	"Guerilla Warfare (遊撃戦, Yuugekisen)"	1:04
8.	"Breakthrough - Rescue Tactics (突破・救出作戦, Toppa / Kyuushitsu Sakusen)"	1:10
9.	"Defensive Battle (防衛戦, Boueisen)"	1:10
10.	"Decisive Battle at Sea! (海上決戦!, Kaijou Kessen!)"	1:07
11.	"Fierce Battle! (激突!, Gekitou!)"	1:00
12.	"He Who Defies God (神に抗う人, Kami ni Aragau Hito)"	1:07
13.	"Pirates (海賊たち, Kaizokutachi)"	1:15
14.	"Those Fangs Devour the World (その牙、世界を喰らう, Sono Kiba, Sekai wo Kurau)"	1:05
15.	"The Enemy Arrives with a Secret Plan (出でる敵、潜む策, Ideru Teki, Hisomu Saku)"	1:10
16.	"The Saint who Embraces Death (屍を抱く聖女, Shi wo Idaku Seijo)"	1:08
17.	"Those who Seek the Light (光を求める者たち, Hikari wo Motomeru Monotachi)"	1:09
18.	"History of Holy War (聖戦の系譜, Seisen no Keifu)"	0:44
19.	"Trust in Your Friends (仲間への信頼, Nakama e no Shinrai)"	0:34
20.	"Blue Ocean Boy (蒼海の少年, Soukai no Shounen)"	1:32
21.	"The Guide to Euforia (ユーフォリアへ導く者, Yuuforia e Michibikumono)"	1:18
22.	"My Twin Guns Sing on the Battlefield (双銃は戦場で歌う, Soujuu wa Senjou de Utau)"	1:13
23.	"Supreme Ruler of the Sea (大海の覇者, Taikai no Hasha)"	1:14
24.	"The Cat-Eared Pirate (猫耳の海賊, Nekomimi no Kaizoku)"	1:16
25.	"The Fighting Archaeologist! (戦う考古学者!, Tatakau Koukogakusha!)"	1:19
26.	"Candy Power! (キャンディーパワー!, Kyandii Pawaa!)"	1:18
27.	"The Demon Lance-Wielding Vampire (魔槍を持つ吸血鬼, Masou wo Motsu Kyuuketsuki)"	1:16
28.	"Flowing Pure Will (流れる清廉の意思, Nagareru Seiren no Ishi)"	1:18
29.	"Ga-ga-ga-Gang! (ガガガガング!, Gagagagangu!)"	1:07
30.	"The Golden Destroyer (黄金を纏う破壊者, Ougon wo Matou Hakaisha)"	1:18
31.	"Brave!"	1:18
32.	"Avaricious Lady Pirate (強欲なる女海賊, Gouyokunaru Onna Kaizoku)"	1:31
33.	"It's the Great Pamela! (パメラ様だわさ!, Pamera-sama da wa sa!)"	1:21
34.	"Beautifully, Fiercely (可憐に、獰猛に, Karen ni, Doumou ni)"	1:33
35.	"They Entrusted Their Dreams to the Sea (大海に夢を託した者達, Taikai ni Yume wo Takushita Monotachi)"	1:06
36.	"Covetous Fangs (垂涎する牙, Suizensuru Kiba)"	1:13
37.	"First-Rate Villainy (極上の悪意, Gokujou no Akui)"	1:13
38.	"Greedy Merchants (欲塗れの商人, Yoku Mabure no Shounin)"	1:04
39.	"On a Straight Rail (逸れないレールの上で, Sorenai Reeru no Ue de)"	1:09
40.	"For the Hope of Tomorrow... (明日の希望の為に…, Asu no Kibou no Tame ni...)"	1:21
41.	"The Sacrificed Saint (捧げられた聖女, Sasagerareta Seijo)"	1:17
42.	"Move Out!! (進軍!!, Shingun!!)"	1:12
43.	"The Strongest Unbeatable Heroes (最強にして不破の豪傑, Saikyou ni shite Fuha no Gouketsu)"	1:03
44.	"The Seeker (求める者, Motomeru Mono)"	1:17
45.	"The Power of Euforia (ユーフォリアの力, Yuuforia no Chikara)"	1:19
46.	"Victory! (勝利!, Shouri!)"	0:07
47.	"Disgrace (不屈, Fukutsu)"	0:07
48.	"The Battle Continues (戦いは続く, Tatakai wa Tsudzuku)"	0:12
49.	"At the End of the Battle (戦いの果てに, Tatakai no Hate ni)"	0:58
50.	"Banquet of Victory (勝利の宴, Shouri no Utage)"	0:07
51.	"Fighting Spirit Sinking to the Depths (深淵へ消える戦意, Shinnen e Kieru Seni)"	0:10
52.	"Drifting Days (流れるままの日々, Nagareru Mama no Hibi)"	1:28
53.	"Power of the Awakened Will (覚醒する意思の力, Kakuseisuru Ishi no Chikara)"	1:21
54.	"Touch and Go (一触即発, Isshoku Sokuhatsu)"	2:03
55.	"Critical Attack and Defense (瀬戸際の攻防, Setogiwa no Koubou)"	1:22
56.	"Tears of the Sea (海の涙, Umi no Namida)"	1:14
57.	"Ship's Log (航海日誌, Koukai Nisshi)"	2:12
58.	"History of Battle (戦いの歴史, Tatakai no Rekishi)"	1:15
59.	"With the Blue Sea... (蒼海と共に…, Soukai to Tomo ni...)"	3:29
60.	"The Sea Route to Glory (栄光へと続く航路…, Eikou e to Tsudzuku Kouro)"	3:18
61.	"Glorious Pirates (栄光の海賊たち, Eikou no Kaizokutachi) (Unused Track)"	1:22
