= Gungnir (video game) =

2011 video game

- Developer: Sting Entertainment
- Publisher: Atlus
- Producer: Shinichi Ito
- Designers: Satoko Kiyuduki (Character Design); Yoshinori Iwanaga (Monster Illustration); Yukio Takatsu (Opening Animation Director); JaJa (System, Concept, and Screen Design)
- Writer: Hiroki Asai
- Composer: Shigeki Hayashi
- Series: Dept. Heaven
- Platform: PlayStation Portable
- Release: JP: May 19, 2011; NA: June 12, 2012; PAL: February 13, 2013
- Genre: Tactical role-playing game
- Mode: Single player

Gungnir (Note: full title Gungnir: Inferno of the Demon Lance and the War of Heroes (グングニル -魔槍の軍神と英雄戦争-, Gunguniru: Masou no Gunjin to Eiyuu Sensou)) is a tactical role-playing game developed by Sting Entertainment and published by Atlus. It is Episode IX of the Dept. Heaven series. The game was released in Japan on May 19, 2011 for the PlayStation Portable after two years of development.

== Gameplay ==
Sample status screen featuring Giulio.

Gungnir is divided between event scenes, battles, and breaks between each stage in which the player may buy new equipment and change the equipment of party characters. The game display is isometric, with hand-drawn character sprites and environments rendered in 3D. The game uses a time system with a mechanic known as the "Tactics Gauge."

Gungnir features an optional support mode for players struggling with the system and difficulty level. Both multiple routes and Easy Mode were later confirmed.

The gauge displayed on the left side of the screen is known as the Tactics Gauge, and the Tactics Points used to fill the gauge can be employed for various functions. The more Tactics Points are in the gauge, the stronger the party's attacks will be, but these points may also be used for the Scramble function, which interrupts the natural turn order and allows the player to mobilize his or her army any time they please. Tactics Points are primarily gained by obtaining control over key locations of each battlefield.

Two extra methods of attack that rely on cooperation between allies. Beat involves up to four extra allies joining in to attack the targeted enemy as long as they are within the plus-shaped target locus; Boost involves allies on a similar locus extending from the initiator lending their strength for a single powerful attack. How many squares these loci extend depends on how many key locations the player controls.

Once the player has obtained Gungnir itself in the story, Julio can use it to summon great demons called the Inferno (軍神, Gunshin) or "gods of war" to produce various field-wide effects. Doing so costs Tactics Points. There are five in all, and they are all named after figures in Norse mythology. The first to join the player is Einherjar, the god of rebellious spirit, which deals damage. The second is Midgardsormr, a monstrous beast that destroys equipment. The third is Vánargandr, which both inflicts status effects and deals damage. The fourth is Lífþrasir, who bears a resemblance to series mainstay character Marietta, and heals status effects, damage, and vitality. The last is Fimbultyr, which bestows the Brave status effect. Whether or not the Inferno other than Einherjar awaken and become usable depends on how much Quality Gungnir has.

The game features nine decision points during cutscenes, which determine both the general path of the game and the contents of each ending. Certain scenes vary based on the player's choices and thus Giulio's behavior.

== Story ==
Gungnir begins in the year 983 and takes place in the empire of Gargandia, a country populated by two races: the upper-class Daltania and the peasant Leonica. The Leonica race is regarded as "cursed" for yet unknown reasons, and is subjected to harsh class discrimination.

Because of this and incidents such as the "Espada Massacre" that occurred over fifteen years ago, a group of Leonicans aided by Daltania sympathizers has formed a resistance army called Esperanza. Their resistance is, however, badly outmatched and struggling.

One day, a young platoon leader in Esperanza named Giulio comes upon a slave trader taking a kidnapped Daltania girl out of the country, and he and his men rescue her. He welcomes the girl, Alissa, into Esperanza, although she worries what response this will bring from the Daltania military.

Shortly after this, during a desperate battle that appears as though it may cost Giulio's life, a powerful demonic weapon appears before him. Identifying it as the demon lance Gungnir, he decides to take it up, and uses it to seize victory from the jaws of defeat, striking terror into the hearts of many. Giulio and Esperanza come to believe that Gungnir will give them the power they need to win the war with the ruling class, but this acquisition causes Giulio's destiny to begin moving.

== Characters ==
Giulio Raguel (ジュリオ・ラグウェル, Jurio Raguweru)
The protagonist of the story, a fifteen-year-old Leonica youth born and raised in the poor district of Espada. He has been a part of Esperanza since he was very young, and has taken part in countless battles while growing up. Julio idolizes his father, who is considered to be a hero by those who live in Espada, and wants to grow up to be just like him. He values his friends and family very highly. While he always works as hard as he can, this is actually because he has something of an inferiority complex, especially when he is compared to Ragnus.

Julio dresses mostly in blue; he has wavy brown hair and green eyes that are depicted as almost completely lightless in Satoko Kiyuduki's official artwork. Although he is capable of using Gungnir, as a Fencer-class unit, his primary weapon is the sword.

Alissa (アリッサ, Arissa)
The main heroine of the story. Alissa is a timid sixteen-year-old Daltania girl who is rescued by Giulio from slave traffickers wishing to sell her in another country. Her exact lineage is shrouded in mystery, but she is implied to be nobility of some sort; Alissa herself prefers not to draw attention to her heritage. She begins the story as a non-player character, but eventually gains the will to fight, and is said to be hard-headed when it comes to doing what she believes is right.

Alissa is blonde and has green eyes; she wears a lacy gown and a red hooded cape. Official artwork depicts her wielding a massive lance with a pink flower motif; her unit class is Royal and her secondary weapon is the staff.

Ragnus Raguel (ラグナス・ラグウェル, Ragunasu Raguweru)
Despite being Daltania, Ragnus came to live in Espada with the Leonica when he was a very young boy. More than fifteen years ago, he saw his adoptive father brutally murdered by Imperial soldiers in the Espada Massacre, an event that traumatized him badly and left him with a deep desire for revenge. Since that time, he has devoted himself to Esperanza, and currently holds the rank of a captain. Julio is his adoptive brother. Ragnus tries to make decisions coolly in order to be a good leader, he is actually an extremely emotional person.

Ragnus has unevenly cut dark brown hair and eyes of the same color; he wears darkly colored clothing and a striped scarf. Despite having a delicate constitution, he wields an immense battleaxe. His unit class is Gladiator, and swords are his secondary weapon. He is also a Daltan and might be the astral heir.

Elise (エリーゼ, Eriize)
A mysterious girl who claims to be from Asgard. She speaks of the Grim (魔槍を綴りし者（グリム）, Masou wo Tsutsurishimono (Gurimu)), and while very concerned with Gungnir and Julio, she has interest in little else. Elise participates in battle only in order to assist Julio. Her unit class is Valkyrie, and she can use bows and rapiers; she has blue eyes and hair and her brightly colored clothes are decorated with many pairs of white wings.

Her development name was Ecrile.

Natalia Raymont (ナタリア・レイモンド, Nataria Reimondo)
A prodigy fencer who received her first medal at the age of fourteen. She has an overly serious personality, and is very honest, believing strongly in swordsmanship and learning. She plans to revolt against the Gargandian faction attempting to establish dictatorship.

Natalia has very long hair worn in a ponytail and wears red armor over a white dress and pink cape reminiscent of Mellia's attire, and wields a red rapier similar to Aegina's sword Red Crimson. Her character class is Duelist, and she can use rapiers and swords.

Paulo (パウロ, Pauro)
One of the founders of Esperanza, a former magister at the Gargandian court who was exiled to Espada after a certain incident. While he ordinarily behaves as a genial old man, he has an authoritative position in Esperanza and serves as a surrogate parent to the three orphaned Raguel children. He is seen as the "village elder" of Esperanza. Paulo is wiry and bespectacled with flyaway white hair and a mustache. He wields rods and grimoires, and has healing powers; his class is Alchemist.

Valerie Brigid (ヴァレリィ・ブリギット, Varerii Burigitto)
A Daltania woman who became a target of the Imperial Army for political reasons. She seeks to revive the republican political faction, and joins up with Esperanza despite being a different race from most of its members. While she originally had no knowledge of how to fight, she studies the art of the crossbow in order to get revenge for her exile.

Valery has red hair braided into a bun and purple eyes. Her class is Rebel, and she can use bowguns and claws.

Fiona Raguel (フィオナ・ラグウェル, Fiona Raguweru)
Julio's blood-related older sister. She was born and raised in Espada, and is fiercely protective of her family due to the loss of her parents. While cheerful, she is even firmer in her beliefs than her brother. Fiona wears blue clothing and appears to work as a bartender, and has the same hair and eye color as her brother. She wears her hair in a ponytail at the side of her head. Unlike the other characters announced thus far, she is an NPC.

Fiona's development name was Sofia; she likes to cook using hard-to-come-by ingredients and does not like to tell lies.

Emperor Wolfgang III (皇帝 ヴォルフガング三世, Koutei Vorufugangu Sansei)
The current sovereign of the Gargandia Empire. He is known for his policies of strict racial segregation, and is called War Emperor (武帝, Butei) by some for his aggressive personality. He is currently bedridden, and it is all he can do to even sit on the throne.

Robertus Raymont (ロベルトゥス・レイモンド, Roberutusu Reimondo)
The chief knight of the Empire, who has fought through many battlefields at the Emperor's side. However, he is opposed to the depth of the racial discrimination in Gargandia. He wields a giant lance, and is Natalia's adoptive father. His unit class is General, and he is also capable of wielding grimoires.

Heramia (ヒエラメイア, Hierameia)
A mysterious prophet belonging to the indigenous star-based religion of Gargandia. She sometimes offers Julio and his party prophecies or advice. Her class is Teller, and she wields grimoires.

Ziyad Berlioz (ザイアード・ベルリオズ, Zaiaado Beruriozu)
A paraplegic man who serves as Wolfgang's chief adviser. Now that Wolfgang is ill, it is essentially Zaird who now rules the country. He holds many opposing beliefs to Robertus, and the relations between the two of them are very bad. Zaird's unit class is Chariot, and he is capable of wielding maces and rods.

Isabeli (イザヴェリ, Izaveri)
A young girl who practices necromancy. She serves as one of Zaird's subordinates and is called "Corpse Eater" for her skills. No one knows what her true motives are. Isabeli has glasses and brown eyes, and wears her long royal blue hair in a ponytail. Her character class is Necromancer, and she wields scrolls and rods.

Pamela (パメラ, Pamera)
The Dept. Heaven series mascot, a mysterious dancing witch who came from a land far away from Gargandia. She calls her special technique "The Great Pamela's Super Magic". Pamela appears in the same pink and purple costume as in the rest of the series, and wields brooms. Her class is Mystic.

Rodriguez (ロドリゲフ, Rodorigefu)
Leader of a band of mountain bandits. He has no interest in anything but money and alcohol, but for some reason hates Esperanza desperately whilst he is from Esperanza. He wields a gigantic axe, and his class is Bandit. He lives on a mountain in the snow in a cabin.

Griselda
Assistant of Rodriguez. Second in command of the mountain bandits.

== Development ==
Giulio, in the opening of the game.

Details about Gungnir and its development first emerged in JaJa's blog as early as May 2009, where it was referred to by the code name "9th". However, while 34 entries were posted over the course of May and June of that year featuring development talk and occasional postings of concept artwork, JaJa's blog went silent after that time. While Sting initially projected that the game would be released in late 2010, no more was said about it during the development of Yggdra Unison's DS remake, Hexyz Force, the PSP version of Knights in the Nightmare, and Blaze Union, which were developed and released from late 2009 to mid-2010.

The project resurfaced in February 2011 with an announcement in Famitsu magazine, followed by the appearance of a teaser site maintained by Sting and hosted on Atlus' domain. On February 24, JaJa uploaded his first post in two years, confirming Gungnir as Dept. Heaven Episode IX. According to JaJa, part of the reason he had not updated his blog during this time was because Sting received a great deal of help on Gungnir from people outside the company itself, and he was worried about causing trouble if he mentioned things that weren't supposed to be revealed yet. Attached to the post in question is a sketch by Satoko Kiyuduki featuring the four main characters of the game backstage at the Famitsu announcement, complaining about their two-year wait.

JaJa remarked in his production blog that "This time we're not going for the 'What the heck is this?!' mysterious approach of Knights in the Nightmare... I think it'll be the type of thing where people will look at the game screen and wonder, 'Is it this type of game then?' And at first, that guess will be right on. However, as you play the game, parts that make you go 'Huh? What's this??' will pop up all over the place if we can get the finishing touches right".

According to a post by Kiyuduki in the staff blog, the game's visuals originally had a much more super-deformed feel to them before changes were made based on Asai's script and Ito's orders for retakes. The opening movie, which was completed fairly early into production, retains the softer and more baby-faced versions of the characters from that time.

Atlus USA announced that the English version of the game would be released on June 12, 2012.

== Merchandise ==
A demo build of the game was made available for download from the Japanese PSN starting on 14 April 2011. It includes the first three stages of the game and the first scene of the fourth, as well as all branches created by choices up to that point.

In addition, a prerelease mini-album was made available for download through iTunes, distributed by Atlus. This release contains the three tracks that play randomly on the Gungnir homepage: The title track "Gungnir" (ガングニール, Gunguniru), battle theme "The Noble Ones" (高潔なる者たち, Kouketsunaru Monotachi), and "Theme of Alchemy" (錬金術のテーマ, Renkinjutsu no Teema) (Paulo's theme).

Preorders of the game from certain online stores (Messe Sanon, Medialand, Imagine, Softmap, and WonderGOO) come with a phone card featuring special illustrations of certain characters (Fiona, Natalia, Alyssa, and Elise respectively).

The game's strategy guide, Gungnir -Inferno of the Demon Lance and the War of Heroes- Official Complete Guide, was produced by Softbank Creative and sold starting on June 3, 2011. The 2-disc official soundtrack was released under the SMD itaku label on June 22. An official art, documents, and settings book was released on August 3, also by Softbank Creative.

== Reception ==
Reception

Aggregate score
Aggregator	Score
Metacritic	68/100

Gungnir has received mixed reviews. Tech-Gaming found the game's battle system to offer a nice variation on strategy role-playing formula and lauded the game's charming graphical style which consistently offers a plethora of information but bemoaned the game's plodding introduction.
