= Knights in the Nightmare =

2008 video game

- Developer: Sting Entertainment
- Publishers: JP: Sting Entertainment; NA: Atlus USA
- Designer: Shinichi Ito
- Artists: Satoko Kiyuduki; Sunaho Tobe; Yoshinori Iwanaga
- Composer: Shigeki Hayashi
- Series: Dept. Heaven
- Platforms: Nintendo DS; PlayStation Portable; Nintendo Switch
- Release: Nintendo DS: JP: September 25, 2008; NA: June 2, 2009; PlayStation Portable: JP: April 22, 2010; NA: November 9, 2010; Nintendo Switch: JP: April 7, 2022
- Genres: Role-playing video game, real-time strategy
- Mode: Single-player

Knights in the Nightmare (Note: Japanese: ナイツ・イン・ザ・ナイトメア, Hepburn: Naitsu in za Naitomea) is a role-playing video game developed by Sting Entertainment. It is the fourth episode in the Dept. Heaven series of video games. It was released by Atlus USA in North America.

== Gameplay ==
The game is divided into three separate screens: the Setup, which consists of the player preparing for the battle, the "Tactics Screen", which shows a preview of the scenario, and the actual Battle. Except otherwise noted, the game is fully controlled by the Nintendo DS' touchscreen throughout all of these areas. At its core, the general gameplay mostly resembles a turn-based strategy role-playing game, but it also extensively uses elements from several other genres, such as real-time strategy and bullet hell.

=== Setup ===
In this screen, the player is allowed to prepare for the upcoming battle. This screen gives several options to allow the player to look up the stats and info of the playable Knights, Equipment, and special items available. This is, however, the only screen in which the player can level up the Knights (the characters used for attacking enemies) and Equipment (the items used for damaging the enemies).

The experience points gathered from the previous battles is accumulated into this screen and then given to the player to choose where to distribute, not to the Knights themselves as in most role-playing games. Those that do gain the extra levels are rewarded for more access to higher-level Equipment and a small amount of "Vitality". Similarly, Equipment are given items which can be used to "level up" in a special manner so that they are more powerful and have additional bonuses. However, this puts the potential of not having enough experience for other Knights, or the risk of losing the Knight/Equipment obtained, or simply having a bad level/upgrade.

There is also an option to "Transoul" (or "transfer one's soul") a Knight to another Knight, since all of the playable Knights are considered dead excluding the central characters. Potentially, this allows for stronger Knights at the risk of losing another and/or having a bad outcome. An extremely large amount of conditions exist in this system (such as the past life of the Knights themselves, their elemental affinities, the race of the Knights, etc.) and these conditions must be well regarded in order to have the best possible outcome. ^{c}

=== Tactics Screen ===
This screen is done as a final preparation before each battle "turn" is actually initiated. The player can select the Knights, Items, and Equipment in use for the battle, and also look up information on the enemies that will appear in the battle. This mostly resembles common tactical role-playing games in which the player is given time to prepare.

Also in this screen is the option for the player to change the initial "Phase" of the battle. While this can also be changed during the actual battle, this can be done at will by a flick of the in-game switch. Resembling something like Ikaruga's black and white switch, the two phases can be changed to greatly affect the play of the battle, ranging from damage location to the Equipment used. Where each Equipment has an elemental affinity, each also has a Phase affinity, or, rarely, none at all. Also, each Knight has a point-based affinity to either Phase that can greatly affect the damage output while in battle. ^{a}

=== Battle ===
The battles take place in real time on an isometric grid (see Isometric graphics in video games). The "Wisp," which resembles a small ball of light, is controlled via the touchscreen and moves around the field to give orders to allied units. When the wisp comes into contact with a unit that can be controlled, the attack must be aimed by moving around the Wisp into one of the four intermediate compass directions and then lifting the stylus off the touchscreen. However, the wisp will be under constant enemy fire, so the player must guide the Wisp to dodge the shots as well as order the allied units to attack. Normal attacks generate "Gems", which recharge the Magic Point meter. Equipment, such as swords, axes, and magical wands, can be used to generate Skill Attacks which can kill enemies and destroy objects on the field.

Despite having a timer, "time" is only deducted for charging attacks and when the player's wisp takes "damage" from on-screen bullets. Thus the player has virtually unlimited "time" to plan strategies and in this manner resembles other turn-based strategy role-playing games, but this is done instead in real time. If there is any "time" left, it can be converted in the Pause Menu to either Experience Points or Magic Points and will end the battle "turn".

To further change the pace of the battlefield, the game has a "Rush Count" system. Each time an enemy is hit, this counter ups by one and activates the condition associated with that number, as long as that number remains the same between hits and if there is one available. For example, one hit to an enemy may give a Rush Count number of replenishing to a Knight, similar to how a healing potion works in common role-playing games, while another hit may give maximum health to the enemy. ^{b}

=== Goals ===
Excluding boss battles, the goal of each battle is not to defeat as many enemies as possible, but to align the enemy deaths in a tic-tac-toe style (that is, horizontally, vertically, or diagonally) across the "Enemy Matrix" (which is displayed at the bottom of the screen) labeled in-game by "KILL markers". This isn't accomplished in one "turn", but over multiple, since the enemies are selected manually by the player via roulette. Since boss battles always have one central enemy to kill, this system isn't used, and is instead represented by a health bar going across the bottom of the screen, but these bosses normally have extremely large amounts of health and deploy larger amounts of bullet hell-like instances.

However, there are a limited number of times the player can have in any of these battles. Permadeath exists as characters have a "Vitality" stat which decreases when they use skills, and the same applies to the Equipment, but is referred in-game as "Durability". Vitality is replenished through leveling up in the Setup screen, the "Transoul" system, and other special circumstances such as the "Rush Count" system, while Durability is similarly acquired from merging like Equipment. ^{a} ^{b}

== Plot ==
=== Story ===
The story in Knights is told in both a forward and reverse fashion, with the revelation of past events - what happened at castle Aventheim - being used to decide and explain the events of the present. The plot follows the player's wisp and a Valkyrie, the former of whom recruits fallen knights as allies to battle against monsters. These allies' pre-death stories are shown as glimpses of the Before Crisis events.

==== Before Crisis ====
The Before Crisis flashbacks explain that the disaster at Aventheim was caused by Capehorn, who summoned the demon Zolgonark in order to gain the power to get revenge on both the Knight Kingdom who oppressed his people and the Tiamat. Though Capehorn is also of Tiamat descent, he was exiled after his discovery of the Written Law and proposal that it should be used to defeat the Knight Kingdom. He was taken in as one of Wilmgard's retainers, but betrayed the king and knights, leaving all those with no allegiance to him to have their souls taken by the demons. Capehorn's ultimate goal is to destroy the barriers between the worlds and remake the universe as he pleases.

At the same time, Zolgonark sought to escape Capehorn's control in order to conquer the world of Aventheim and make it a part of the Underworld. In order to do so, he contacted Marietta, who had been dispatched to the world to discipline the humans for recreating Kilgia Tower, which Asgard perceived as sinful for its height, but had been created by the Lemonoug as a way to plead for Asgard to save them from oppression. By promising to give Marietta the power she desired, he tricked her into removing Capehorn's barriers, and then stole Ancardia and split her soul in two, claiming one half as his servant. That half of Marietta's soul killed King Wilmgard when he returned to the castle; the king's soul was sealed inside a crucible, which was stolen by the opposing half of Marietta at the start of the game.

=== Characters ===
- Wisp (ウィスプ, Wisupu): The player controlled character, the disembodied soul of King Wilmgard (ウィリムガルド王, Wirimugarudo Ou). He is a descendant of the Arbitrator lineage, a human family charged with defending the world of Aventheim from damage that might be incurred by battles between Asgard and the demons. The Wisp's memories have been damaged by the trauma of being torn from its body, resulting in temporary amnesia, but with occasional help from Maria and her analogues in alternate routes, he rallies the similarly disembodied souls of the country's knights to drive out the demons. His name in the Japanese version of the game is Willimgard, and he is 38 years old.
- Maria (マリア, Maria): A mysterious armor-clad valkyrie whom the Wisp encounters many times over the course of the story. She is eventually revealed to be one half of the angel Marietta's soul, which Zolgonark split in two after manipulating her into removing his barrier. Maria blames the state of Aventheim on her desire for greater strength to better serve Asgard, and despite her stern looks is actually downcast and somewhat timid. She cooperates with the Wisp to defeat Zolgonark's forces, but often departs on her own in order to search for her staff Ancardia, which Zolgonark stole from her. She is well aware that even if she manages to defeat the demons, become one with Melissa, and put right the problems her mistake has caused, she will still be cast out of Asgard for what she has done. As part of the PSP version's advertisement campaign, Maria was given her own Twitter account, which may be found here.
- Melissa (メリッサ, Merissa): The other half of Marietta's soul, Melissa is bound to serve Zolgonark as an aftereffect of their contract. She encounters and fights with Maria and the Wisp several times while searching for Ancardia, but does not seem to hold ill will towards either of them, possessing an aimless and whimsical nature. Unlike Maria, Melissa retains her desire for power, and secretly hopes for the opportunity to absorb Zolgonark's power if she cannot regain Ancardia.
- Mellia (メリア, Meria): The counterpart to Maria in an alternate-universe scenario that displays what might have happened had Maria and Melissa's roles been reversed. Like Maria, she cooperates with the Wisp while searching for Ancardia. In contrast with her, however, Mellia is assertive to the point of being irreverent, and only seeks Ancardia because she wants to destroy it to get back at Marietta. Despite her inherent selfishness and cocky attitude, Mellia is insecure about her own identity, which is implied to stem from Marietta treating her as an aberration with no right to exist. By the end of the story, she grows to trust the Wisp very deeply. After the release of the PSP version, she was also given a Twitter account, which may be found here.
- Marietta (マリエッタ, Marietta): A guardian angel dispatched by Asgard to the world of Aventheim to punish the Lemonoug race for building the Tower of Kilvas. Her earnest desire to become stronger and become more useful was taken advantage of by Zolgonark, who split her soul in two to suit his own purposes. She appears at the end of Maria's route as the complete form of Maria and Melissa's soul, and takes on an antagonistic role in Mellia's route, where she assumes Melissa's role. Marietta's portrayal differs between the routes, as in Maria's she is depicted as a good but ultimately misguided person, whereas she treats Mellia cruelly in the alternate route. At the end of Mellia's route, she presents the player with the option to betray Mellia and side with her for the sake of order. Marietta first appeared as one of the Accursed in Riviera: The Promised Land, and is shown before her fall from grace in Yggdra Union. Among the game's other topics, Knights portrays what happened to Marietta after Yggdra to cause her to be exiled.

Sting claims the game has over 200 characters. The vast majority are met during battle and recruited by using items obtained from previous levels. In the PSP version, another non-canon scenario is available, in which the player uses Princess Yggdra (from Yggdra Union) in place of Maria.

== Development and release ==
Screenshots, artwork and music clips for Knights were revealed over two years prior to the game's release on the blog of JaJa, one of the developers. Satoko Kiyuduki reprises her design role from Yggdra Union: We'll Never Fight Alone. Sunaho Tobe, having worked on the first two Dept. Heaven titles, and Yoshinori Iwanaga, having done the monster designs for the initial release of Riviera also return for Knights' illustrations. Shigeki Hayashi, having composed music for both Riviera and Yggdra Union returned to compose the soundtrack for Knights.

While the game was initially intended to be sold in July in Japan, its release date was pushed back until September. According to Ito, this is because Sting realized that a more in-depth tutorial was needed to help players learn the game's complex systems; many adjustments to the game interface were also done at this time.

Sting released a special edition version of Knights in the Nightmare, called the Knights in the Nightmare DHE Series Special Pack (ナイツ・イン・ザ・ナイトメア （D・H・Eシリーズ スペシャルパック）, Naitsu in za Naitomea (DHE Shirīzu Supesharu Pakku)); it includes a copy of Yggdra Union: We'll Never Fight Alone for the Game Boy Advance.

A remastered version for the Nintendo Switch released exclusively in Japan on April 7, 2022.

== Reception ==
Reception

Aggregate score
Aggregator	Score	
Aggregator	DS	PSP
Metacritic	76/100	75/100

Review scores
Publication	Score	
Publication	DS	PSP
Destructoid	8.5/10	8.5/10
Edge	6/10	N/A
Famitsu	32/40	31/40
Game Informer	7/10	N/A
GamePro	3.5/5	N/A
GameRevolution	C−	N/A
GameSpot	8/10	N/A
GameZone	8.9/10	7/10
IGN	8.8/10	N/A
Nintendo Power	8/10	N/A
PlayStation: The Official Magazine	N/A	8/10
RPGamer	4.5/5	N/A
RPGFan	82/100	83/100
Teletext GameCentral	7/10	N/A

The game received "generally favorable reviews" on both platforms according to the review aggregation website Metacritic. In Japan, Famitsu gave it a score of 32 out of 40 for the DS version, and 31 out of 40 (8/8/7/8) for the PSP version.

The DS version reached sixteenth place in sales in its release week in Japan, and was also nominated for an excellence award at the Japan Media Arts Festival 2008. IGN's Mark Bozon praised the same DS version's depth and complexity. The most common complaint among the reviewers was the tutorial, which is almost an hour long, and its very steep learning curve.

== Notes ==
- ^a Knights in the Nightmare Instruction Booklet pg. 12–15
- ^b Knights in the Nightmare Instruction Booklet pg. 16–24
- ^c Knights in the Nightmare Instruction Booklet pg. 25–28, 32
