= Dept. Heaven =

- Developer: Sting
- Publisher: Atlus
- First release: Riviera: The Promised Land; July 12, 2002
- Latest release: Gloria Union; June 23, 2011

Dept. Heaven is a series of video games developed by Sting, headed by Shinichi Ito. Four main entries were released across the 2000s and early 2010s - Riviera: The Promised Land (2002), Yggdra Union (2006), Knights in the Nightmare (2008) and Gungnir (2011). While a fifth entry was briefly teased in 2008, only spinoffs and remasters have released moving into the 2020s.

== Games ==
=== Episode I: Riviera ===
Riviera: The Promised Land is the first entry to be released in the Dept. Heaven series. It was originally released in Japan in 2002 for the WonderSwan Color. A remake of the game was developed for the Game Boy Advance, releasing in 2004 in Japan, and debuting in English the following year. In 2006, a remastered version was released for the PlayStation Portable, which saw an English release the following year. An HD remaster was announced in 2023, with no platforms or release date mentioned.

The game takes place on the floating continent of Riviera. The main character, Ein being a resident of Asgard, is sent by The Seven Magi to rid Riviera of demons and becomes tangled in a bid for the Gods' dormant power through The World Tree.

Riviera is played almost as a visual novel, with "triggers" on each screen that can be selected, rather than directly controlling the movement of Ein. In battle, Riviera plays out similarly to the RPG stereotype, however aiming and attacking requires much more careful control, due to the lack of an explicit ability to decide the target of an attack, and the fact that all but one item have a limited number of uses.

Riviera focused very strongly on the story and character interaction, even going so far as providing the player with the opportunity to slightly affect the ending by developing stronger relationships through his actions with particular female members of the cast.

=== Episode II: Yggdra Union ===
Yggdra Union takes place on an unnamed continent. The game chronicles the Yggdra War, where the Bronquian army begins a brutal rampage throughout the world, conquering territories until Princess Yggdra Yuril Artwaltz, of one of the conquered countries, rallies against them.

The game plays differently from most Strategy RPGs, in that you have some amount of control over the battles you would typically just watch. In these battles you can activate cards and control your units' attack strategies. Another unique aspect of the game is that the on-map formation of your units is very important, creating the eponymous "Union" system that is vital to victory.

There are multiple spinoffs to this Episode: Yggdra Unison, Blaze Union, and Gloria Union. Yggdra Unison is an alternate-universe retelling of the main game with twelve possible protagonists; Blaze Union is a prequel to Yggdra Union taking place in Bronquia three years prior. Gloria Union is a newly announced game featuring a pirate drama unconnected to the other games.

=== Episode III ===
No name or information has been revealed on Episode III, other than in 2008, it was being planned as a PC MMORPG.

=== Episode IV: Knights in the Nightmare ===
Knights in the Nightmare takes place in Aventheim, a world recently interrupted by the invasion of a demonic army. The player leads the Wisp through the story, unraveling the past through the events of the present, in order to save Aventheim.

The game plays like Chess infused with RPG ala turn-based Tactical role-playing and shoot 'em up elements. The player moves the Wisp around using the touchscreen, activating attacks on allied characters and avoiding screen-covering shots from enemy characters.

=== Episode IX: Gungnir ===
A story that takes place in the Gargandia Empire, set to a backdrop of racial strife between the noble Daltania and the peasant Leonica. A fifteen-year-old boy named Giulio Raguel, who is part of the Leonica resistance comes upon the powerful demonic weapon Gungnir, and his choice to use it for the sake of the rebellion has drastic consequences.

Gungnir was officially announced in the February 24, 2011 issue of Weekly Famitsu. It combines orthodox SRPG elements with original system features and it was released on May 19, 2011 on the PSP. It is developed by staff members from Yggdra Union.

== Development ==
Upon the announcement of Knights in the Nightmare, it was revealed that the worlds share a common setting through the location of Asgard. In a later Dengeki Maoh article, it was revealed how each game interacted in the Universe, each initially taking place on the overworld and being connected in some way to either Asgard or the Underworld. More connections were revealed when Knights was finally released, in particular with the release of the Dept. Heaven Episodes World Guide and a thinner American version, The Tome of Lost Souls. These releases explained the various connections between the games and further delineated the culture and history of the universe in which they took place.

== Setting ==
Asgard (神界, Shinkai)
The Dept. Heaven equivalent of heaven, a realm that idealizes pure order. It was established by the gods, all-powerful beings of pure logic which series director Shinichi Ito likens to computer programs. Following the gods' disappearance at the end of Ragnarok, Asgard has been ruled by the Seven Magi. It is home to both a humanoid species and the angels, with the humanoids serving as the dominant race. The people of Asgard monitor the surface worlds to make certain that demons are not trying to travel through them to invade Asgard itself.

While the people of Asgard possess emotion and thus the world cannot be called a strictly ordered domain, their biology has been significantly altered from that of ordinary humans; for instance, the digestive system is vestigial and has been replaced by a nutrient-replenishing dormant state called SLEEP. Ordinary Asgardian humanoids, known as Servants, have appeared in both Yggdra Union: We'll Never Fight Alone and Knights in the Nightmare, and wield gunlike electrical weapons.

The Underworld (冥府, Meifu)
The Dept. Heaven equivalent of hell, a realm that idealizes pure chaos. It is inhabited by various races of demons, and expands constantly by conquering and absorbing surface worlds. The demons in general are bitter enemies with the peoples of Asgard, as their very existences are incompatible. However, as demons have a power-based hierarchy and operate under principles of Social Darwinism (e.g. the strong survive and the weak perish), it cannot be called a world with no order in it at all.

The English-language PSP version of Riviera: The Promised Land (and the Japanese Special Edition) feature a short bonus scenario in which Ein accidentally wanders through a portal to the Underworld, accompanied either by the four heroines or by Ledah and Rose, and must defeat the demon god Hades in order to escape. The latter scenario involves Ein, Ledah, and Rose discussing various elements of the universe.

According to Shinichi Ito, the Underworld's setting details are intentionally kept vague in order to preserve the gameplay integrity of the series. The people of Asgard refer to both the Underworld itself and worlds that have been dominated by demons as Utgard (魔界, Makai); while "the Underworld" is the official translation used by Atlus, many fans refer to it as "Niflheim" in keeping with the Norse theme of the series.

Surface Worlds (地上, Chijou)
The general term for all ordinary worlds inhabited by mortals. Riviera, Ancardia (the world of Yggdra Union: We'll Never Fight Alone), Aventheim (the world of Knights in the Nightmare), and Gargandia the world of Gungnir are all examples of these.

The surface worlds were originally created by the gods to serve as a buffer between Asgard and the Underworld, so that Asgard would have greater advance warning when demons attempted to invade. However, Asgard has a general noninterference policy in order to allow worlds to govern and attempt to defend themselves until there is severe danger of a world being overwhelmed.

Each surface world is connected to Heaven's Gate (ヘブンズゲート, Hebunzu Geeto), and as long as these gates are intact, they are considered part of Asgard's territory. Invading demons will create a Hades Gate (ハデスゲート, Hadesu Geeto) and attempt to destroy the world's link to Heaven's Gate, after which Asgard will consider that world a part of Utgard and abandon it.

There are, however, instances where demons and gods appear in surface worlds without creating a Hades Gate, such as summonings by residents of that world (as in the case of Zolgonark in Knights in the Nightmare) or magical anomalies (the way that Brongaa was drawn to Ancardia by Nessiah's sheer power in Yggdra Union: We'll Never Fight Alone). In Gungnir, Giulio Raguel, wielder of demonic spear Gungnir is able to summon various war Gods.

Yumira (ユミラ魔郷, Yumira Makyou)
A world that exists in a dimensional rift unknown to the gods. There are said to be several of these in existence, but thus far Yumira is the only one named. Yumira is world of illusion that is said to be reached through a special magic circle, and its people (called the Yumel (ユメール人, Yumeerujin)) practice magical arts that extend their lifespans. Pamela, the series mascot, is a former resident of this world.

Thus far, Yumira has only featured in Nessiah's backstory, as they are the ones who contracted with him to allow him to use the Power of Words in response to his plea for help.

The Seven Magi (ゴートの七賢, Gooto no Shichiken)
The proxies of the gods, and current de facto rulers of Asgard. Thus far, series villain Hector is the only one that has been named.

Once ordinary humanoids, the Seven Magi were granted longevity bordering on immortality by the special cloaks they wear. Because they all dress the same and hide their eyes, they give off the appearance of beings that have renounced individuality and transcended human nature, but this is merely a public front they maintain to keep their leadership strong. In truth, the seven of them constantly jockey for power, making alliances and betraying one another. Ito explains that Hector is particularly dangerous because of his brilliance, influence, hedonism, and sense of self-entitlement.

The Seven Magi were the ones responsible for changing Riviera (originally a part of the Underworld) into a surface world, and used that victory as a cornerstone for the cease-fire that ended Ragnarok. Ito has expressed interest in creating a game based on their political battles; Sting's Romanization for this term is "Goth" instead of "Magi".

Angels (天使, Tenshi)
One of the races of Asgard. Angels were originally artificial beings created by the gods, and because of this, they cannot be destroyed by the gods despite technically being mortals. In the eyes of Asgard, angels are a defense mechanism of the world, similar in existence to antibodies; they make up the brunt of Asgard's military force and are deployed to fight and destroy demons. In particular, Guardian Angels (守護天使, Shugotenshi) such as Marietta are stationed on Heaven's Gate and considered the backbone of the defense against demons.

Because of their origin, angels are considered subhuman beings in Asgard. They have also come under suspicion during the Magi's reign because their loyalty lies with the gods rather than the humanoid race. Due to the way that they are treated, angels often display a stunted sense of self despite being capable of developing normal emotions and free will once exposed to society.

Although they were originally manufactured by the gods, the Riviera Epilogue Disc depicts angels as being able to reproduce, as it portrays Malice with her family. Absolute loyalty to Asgard is demanded of every angel, and those who disobey any order, appear to be irregular existences, or whose actions endanger Asgard have their powers stripped and are exiled as Fallen Angels (堕天使, Datenshi) (as with Nessiah, Eater, and Marietta respectively).

Grim Angels (告死天使, Kokushitenshi)
A special subclass of angel. The Grim Angels were created by the gods as a last resort in order to defeat the demons during Ragnarok, and violate the taboo that only godly beings can possess godly powers. Each of them is created using the blood of a god, and each is required to sacrifice a part of themselves in order to receive an all-powerful weapon known as a Diviner (ディヴァイン, Divain). These "parts of themselves" can be a body part, such as their wings, or an abstract function, such as emotional capability. Aside from Ein, all true Grim Angels are easily identifiable by their clawed black wings and leucism of the skin.

Because of their immense power and relatively short lifespans compared to other angels, Grim Angels are considered to be no more than living weapons and kept in stasis in a mausoleum when Asgard is not currently facing a great threat. Even then, the Grim Angels actually awakened and dispatched are very few in number, and many Grim Angels are never allowed to awaken again once put into stasis. The Grim Angels' mausoleum is depicted in the opening sequence of Riviera.

As Hector desires to become a god, he is depicted directing experiments on young female angels in order to create artificial Grim Angels throughout the series. Three of his test subjects are shown throughout the series: #367, #549 (Primea), and Malice (#1132). Out of the entire experiment, Malice is the only successful result known. Hector's manmade Grim Angels all wield Diviners known as Skadi (Toolus in Japanese). Sting's original Romanization for this concept is "Death Bring Angelix", a more literal translation of the term "告死天使".

Demons (魔族, Mazoku)
The inhabitants of the Underworld, whose appearance can range from humanoid to monstrous. There are three types: low-level monsters (魔物, Mamono) (e.g. the Red Sage and Blue Fool), Accursed (インフェルノス, Inferunosu) (e.g. Isher and Dotaurus), and demon gods (魔神, Majin) (e.g. Brongaa and Zolgonark). Demon gods are roughly the same level of being as the gods of Asgard, whereas the Accursed are one rank lower, being extremely powerful but unintelligent beings and willing servants of the demon gods created from parts of their bodies. It is possible for demons to gain and lose power and change ranks, a type of "class mobility" per se that is only possible in their fluid society.

In addition to natural-born inhabitants of the Underworld, it is possible for mortals and even those of Asgard to become demons. This can occur one of two ways: Either via a contract (as in the cases of Marietta, Gulcasa's ancestors, and most likely Julio), or by being cursed (as with Nordich and Piche).

While demons instinctively desire power and clash with ordered society, there are cases depicted of very weak monster-level demons deciding to settle into mortal society as residents of surface worlds (the Sage and Fool, the ancestors of the Arcs) and even very powerful demons being able to repress their instincts and live as humans (Gulcasa).

Sprites (精霊, Seirei)
A mostly-humanoid species of elementally based beings who are symbiotically connected to their environment. They are the dominant race in Riviera, and some types also appear in other worlds, such as the Undines and fairies that live in Ancardia. The Sprites were originally slaves to the demons, but were liberated after Ragnarok and serve as maintainers of the surface worlds, Riviera in particular. Many of them physically reflect their natural environment, such as harpies and dryads, whereas those who are descended from assimilated demons still retain demonic traits, like the Arcs. It is suggested that humans are slowly evolving into Sprites as well, evidenced by the appearance of the new Haine race (e.g. Fia, Lina, Cierra).

Symbiotic entities Ursula and Seth are also Sprites, although they have special powers as entities directly created by the gods. Both are viewed by the Sprites of Riviera as goddesses.

Ragnarok (神魔戦争, Shinmasensou)
A great war between Asgard and the Underworld which started when Zolgonark rose to power and organized the demons' forces. Demons invaded and attempted to take over surface worlds en masse, and Asgard defended them as best as possible; the war mostly took the form of plundering surface worlds back and forth. When the gods realized that the scales were tipping in the demons' favor, they retaliated by creating the Grim Angels. After the Grim Angels' victory and the cease-fire established by the Seven Magi, the gods sealed the remains of their power in Riviera, charged the Sprites with its defense, and vanished. Although time flows slightly differently in each surface world, Ragnarok is said to have occurred roughly one thousand years ago in each world at the time that their respective games take place.

Ragnarok should not be confused with the war between Yggdra's forces and Asgard which takes place in the C and D endings of Yggdra Union: We'll Never Fight Alone. While mistakenly translated as "Ragnarok" by Atlus, this war is called "Shinkaisensou (神界戦争)" and literally translates to "the Asgard War".
