= Tomoyuki Higuchi =

Japanese voice actor

- 樋口 智透
- Born: Saitama Prefecture, Japan
- Occupation: Voice actor
- Years active: 2000–present
- Agent: Ken Production (formerly)

Tomoyuki Higuchi (樋口 智透, Higuchi Tomoyuki) is a Japanese voice actor from Saitama Prefecture, Japan. He was originally affiliated with Ken Production, but as of 2015, he is freelance.

== Filmography ==
=== Anime ===
2008

- Kannagi: Crazy Shrine Maidens (Chinpira)

2009

- Kobato (Hiroyasu Ueda)
- Taishō Baseball Girls (Kuchikata, Saitō)
- Battle Spirits: Shōnen Gekiha Dan (Kugutsu)

2010

- Demon King Daimao (2V)
- Ikki Tousen: Xtreme Xecutor (Takafumi)
- SD Gundam Sangokuden Brave Battle Warriors (Chōryō Gelgoog)
- Big Windup! Season 2 (Takeshi Kurata)
- Fairy Tail (Zatō)

2011

- Un-Go (Arata Oyamada)
- Gintama (Issac Schneider)
- Little Battlers Experience (Kuroki)
- Chihayafuru (Ryūgasaki)
- Beelzebub (Ryūji Sanada, Shimamura, Kōtarō Mikagami)
- Ben-To (Goatee)

2012

- Mobile Suit Gundam AGE (Dalesto Coon)
- Guilty Crown (Takaomi Sudō)
- Kuroko's Basketball (Yoshitaka Moriyama)
- Shakugan no Shana III (Final) (Wodan)
- Smile PreCure! (Seiji Igami, Student Council President)
- My Little Monster (Mitsuyoshi Misawa)

2013

- Attack on Titan (Nack Tierce)

2014

- Dramatical Murder (Trip)

2015

- Assassination Classroom (Ryūki)

2016

- Assassination Classroom 2nd Season (Ryūki)

=== Theatrical animation ===
- The Disappearance of Haruhi Suzumiya (Kennosuke Arakawa)
- Friends: Mononoke Shima no Naki (Tasuke)

=== Video games ===
- Blaze Union: Story to Reach the Future (Ordene)
- Disorder 6 (Date)
- Dragon Age II (Zevran)
- Generation of Chaos: Pandora’s Reflection (Morgan)
- Luminous Arc 2 (Master Mattias)
- Shin Megami Tensei: Devil Survivor (Azuma)
- Time Hollow (Tamotsu Tokio)

=== Dubbing ===
- Anonymous (Henry Wriothesley)
- Battle: Los Angeles (Peter Kerns)
- Captain America: The First Avenger (Gilmore Hodge (Lex Shrapnel))
- The Dilemma (Zip)
- The Girl with the Dragon Tattoo (Trinity)
- Glee (Mike Chang, Josh)
- Iron Man: Armored Adventures (Happy Hogan)
- J. Edgar (Agent Jones)
- The Pacific (Robert Oswalt)
- Pretty Little Liars (Ian Thomas)
- Smokin' Aces 2: Assassins' Ball (Troy)
- Spartacus: Blood and Sand (Doctore)
- Splice (Gavin Nicoli)
- Star Wars: The Clone Wars (San Hill)
