= Yggdra Unison =

2007 video game

- Developer: Sting
- Publisher: JP: Sting, Atlus
- Director: Kenji Ikuta
- Designer: Shinichi Ito
- Artists: Satoko Kiyuduki; Sunaho Tobe
- Composer: Minako Adachi
- Series: Dept. Heaven
- Platforms: Cellphone; Nintendo DS
- Release: Cellphone: JP: November 11, 2007; Nintendo DS: JP: December 3, 2009
- Genre: Real-time strategy game
- Mode: Single player

Yggdra Unison (ユグドラ・ユニゾン, Yugudora Yunizon) is a real-time strategy game for the cellular phone and Nintendo DS, developed by Sting Entertainment as a "fandisc"-type spinoff to Yggdra Union. The original cellphone version was self-published and released on November 11, 2007; the DS version was published by Atlus and released on December 12, 2009. Neither installment has been released in any language other than Japanese. The game display is similar to that of Yggdra Union and Blaze Union, but all action is in real-time and units are allowed to move freely instead of on a grid. The DS version is mainly stylus-based with support functions and menu displays toggled by the R/L and directional buttons.

== Gameplay ==
The object of the game is to bring the rest of the world under the player's control. There are twelve playable armies, but at the start of the game, only Yggdra and Milanor may be selected. The other ten armies must be unlocked by fulfilling two to four conditions during a playthrough; what an army's conditions are, can be viewed from the selection screen, with fulfilled conditions appearing in red. Much like other Sting games, the phases of Yggdra Unison are called "turns"; "turns" are split up into three parts—preparation, combat, and treasure hunting.

=== Preparation ===
A scout's report in the cellphone version

During the preparation stage, the player is prompted to choose which card will be effective during the combat stage. The cards are presented face-down, and each playthrough has them in a different randomized order. Each card may only be used once per playthrough; there are exactly as many cards as there are domains, and so every card cannot be used in a single playthrough. As long as this is not the first turn, the player will also receive two Medallions at this time.

After this, a scout will appear and give a report on what is happening in the rest of the world. These reports contain information on two types of things: First, if two enemy characters have fought, then the player is told the outcome of that battle; second, if there are geographical effects, then the player is told which territories have been hit with them. The player's conquered territory will never be invaded, nor will it have geographical effects.

After this, the player is prompted to choose an enemy territory to invade. It is possible to attack any territory that directly touches one's own. When the player's choice is confirmed, the game progresses to the combat stage.

=== Combat ===
Combat is performed in real-time in a capture-the-flag format; the player is given 300 seconds to defeat the enemy general and capture his or her fortress. Each side is initially able to deploy two units, but by capturing neutral villages or deployment points (the latter are exclusive to each side), up to three additional units may be deployed at a time for a total of five. When one side's deployment points are captured by the other, the attacked side's units are forced to retreat if there is not a surplus of deployment points. For instance, if Milanor's army was fighting Ishiene and had captured one village in order to deploy three units, then that village were captured by one of Ishiene's soldiers, Milanor's third unit would have to return to base, losing half its hit points. In addition, enemy soldiers which are made to retreat cannot be redeployed, but allied units can be deployed any number of times as long as they still have hit points.

Villages may be captured back and forth with impunity, but when a non-village deployment point is captured by the enemy, it is permanently destroyed. Units that sit on villages and fortresses slowly recover HP as they do so.

Other map objects include ballistic weapons, which can be captured and used by one side or the other; treasure hunt points; card discovery points, which allow the player to see which card is in play; and event triggers. These cannot be used unless touched by an allied unit.

When two units touch, a clash begins, and the two units attack one another in the style of Fire Emblem battles; after the player's unit attacks, he or she will be prompted to begin a Unison. When a Unison begins, a circle of effect called an Impact Circle appears, and every other allied character on the field will be assigned a number; by entering the numbers of any allies within the Impact Circle, those units will join in the attack and do even more damage. Any unit whose HP is reduced to zero retreats; if the player continues a Union Attack after the enemy's HP hits zero, they start dealing fatal damage. If the HP bar reaches zero twice, this is considered a Kill Out. Unison Attacks can only be used by players.

Sometimes characters with a connection to each other will converse with each other before a clash actually begins, or after it concludes. These are known as Duel Events, and the dialogue changes based on who is attacking whom and whether the clash ends in victory, defeat, or death.

Aegina (top) and Monica (bottom)'s stats, displayed in the unit demo

The unit types from Yggdra Union make a return for this game, with the only difference being that Yggdra, Milanor, and Gulcasa no longer have unique classes. Each unit has several different statistics: VIT (vitality, which shows a unit's morale), HP (which is twice their current vitality), ATK (which ranges from 1 to 10), Impact Circle size, a hidden DEF stat, elemental affinity, movement type, and Pride. VIT decreases slowly each turn for every character except the protagonist, and can be restored after battle by giving that unit items that they like; VIT decreases faster if a unit is deployed against a character that he or she does not want to fight.

The gauge at the upper-left corner of the screen, which shows how much time is left, also displays colored bands that show when cards will activate. A gray bar indicates that the card's activation conditions have not been fulfilled (the right character type is not deployed, for instance); a blue bar shows a positive effect, a red bar shows a negative effect, and a green bar shows a neutral effect. Each card has different effects, which can be seen described either when they activate or examined in greater detail in the Extra Contents section after the game has been beaten once.

When the player captures the enemy's territory, the battle's wrap-up begins. First, the enemy's territory is added to your own; if you have captured the enemy's capital, all of his or her unconquered territory will be added to your own at once. After this occurs, the enemy general will be brought to you as long as you have not killed them in battle, and you will have the opportunity to attempt to recruit them.

The player's army may only have five characters at a time, including the protagonist. When attempting to recruit a sixth character, a player will be prompted to either dismiss a current subordinate to make room or cancel the recruitment.

After this, players will be prompted to give their units items as rewards. By giving units items that they like, their VIT will be restored and their HP will increase. Items' equipment conditions and status bonuses can be viewed at this time, as well as the VIT bonus they will restore to each unit. Some items have humorous equipment conditions that expose certain aspects of characters' personalities that could not be shown in Yggdra Union itself, which is why this game is seen as a "fandisc" to it.

If a player found either of the special event triggers, then that hidden character will also join the war publicly at this time. The player is then prompted to save, and the Treasure Hunting part of the phase begins.

=== Treasure hunting ===
If the player has discovered treasure hunt points during the battle phase, then during this phase of each turn, it is possible to spend the points earned during battles to deploy named generals to search for items in any area whose treasure hunt icon was found. If the deployed unit has a favorable elemental affinity and move type, they will be able to return quickly, but if they have an unfavorable alignment, then the treasure hunt may take a number of turns to be completed.

When a unit is deployed, they will have 30 steps with which to discover a treasure inside a contained labyrinth. Each dungeon will contain treasures. When a treasure chest is discovered, it's possible to choose to keep searching for a different box, but if all 30 steps run out, then the unit must return empty-handed. In addition, if the deployed unit's VIT is too low, they may desert the army instead of coming back.

There are six types of treasure chest that can appear in a dungeon: A burlap sack, a wooden box, a sun box, a moon box, a present box, and the Gorgeous Box (an actual treasure chest). Wooden boxes will always appear, no matter what, and contain common items. Sun boxes only appear if the battle ended during the day, and moon boxes only appear if the battle ended during the night. Causing the other types to appear is much more difficult.

Each territory has a hidden condition that influences whether the other types of treasure will appear. If this is fulfilled, then the present box will appear in the dungeon; in addition, if certain characters with a high affinity to the area are sent to search for treasure, the Gorgeous Box will appear instead. When the hidden condition has not been fulfilled, sending one of these certain characters (with the exception of the territory's owner) will result in the burlap sack appearing. Otherwise, a sun/moon box and two wooden boxes will appear instead. For instance, the condition for discovering the present box and Gorgeous Box at Castle Paltina is to defeat Yggdra using a Unison Attack. If this is done and then Yggdra is sent to search the area in the same turn, the Gorgeous Box will appear in the area.

=== Titles ===
When the player has completed the game, each character will be awarded a title during the epilogue. The title describes what happens to them after the war, as well as how their efforts are honored, and is based on the character's performance.

Titles have several different ranks. Titles from the two lowest ranks tend to be either humorous or negative, depicting the character as unsuccessful or contrary, while the third rank up depicts them more positively; each rank is displayed with a different card on the Hall of Fame screen.

Each route's protagonist has a special title set, and the rank divisions for protagonists are also slightly different. Units' dialogue on the Hall of Fame screen is also determined by their VIT.

=== DS version changes ===
The DS version involves several additions that were not originally present in the cellphone version, aside from the information on the single screen being divided to display on the two screens of the DS. The method of entering the units' numbers has changed from using the cellphone's number keys to writing them manually using the stylus. For the DS version, composer Minako Adachi wrote thirteen new tracks—one each for the armies, as different themes were now to be used during the day and night, and two for the new army.

Special events are also new to the DS version. When these are not discovered, the game handles much the same as the original cellphone version; the special event items must be found in order to involve the new characters in the war.

The biggest difference is that Nessiah and Mistel themselves are now featured characters who do battle. Nessiah was present in the cellphone version, where he explained card effects, but in the DS version he is an unlockable main character. In addition, fourteen new items are included in the DS version—six each for Nessiah and Mistel's territories, the Mirror of Truth as Mistel's event trigger, and the Cloverlight, which replaces the Revelation of the Gods (now Nessiah's event trigger) as the item in the Gorgeous Box at Castle Bronquia.

== Plot ==
Yggdra Unison begins in the year 1490 M.D., with Emperor Gulcasa—the ruler of the New Bronquian Empire—and his vast army attacking and capturing Fort Karona, which lies on the border between his own nation and that of the Kingdom of Fantasinia, the country perceived to be the greatest world power. Fantasinia's defeat and the death of its king shock the world, but unlike the events of Yggdra Union, this shock causes every major world power to strike out in an attempt to conquer the continental world.

The player selects one of these nations, and their storyline unfolds as they conquer other territories, eventually culminating in their achieving world domination. Because of the sandbox-style gameplay, the game focuses more on character interaction and gameplay itself than a linear plot; there are twelve storylines, each following one of the twelve playable characters.

== Development ==
Sting's programmer JaJa began posting blog entries about Yggdra Unison's development as early as 2006. The project was originally codenamed YZ, and early screenshots show that the game's beta title was Yggdra's Ambition ~Holy Sword Legends (Yggdra no Yabou ~ Seiken Buyuuden ユグドラの野望 聖剣武勇伝). While this was changed to Yggdra Unison: Beat Out Our Obstacle, the original tagline was reused for the DS version. Initial screenshots of the game were displayed in black and white.

== Release ==
Yggdra Unison has a few pieces of merchandise. On December 25, 2009, a 127-page strategy guide was released by Enterbrain. The game's original soundtrack was released on February 24, 2010, by the label Geneon Universal, featuring all 40 tracks used in-game plus a full-orchestral version of the Flash Movie BGM, the version rearranged by Shigeki Hayashi which was used in the promotional video. The booklet included notes from Adachi about certain tracks. Later in the year, on 25 March, a drama CD was released by Frontier Works, featuring the same voice talent as the PSP version of Yggdra Union.

=== Drama CD ===
The drama CD contains three short stories, focusing on the Royal Army, Milanor's thief band, and the Imperial Army respectively. The former two are lighthearted and comedic, whereas the last of the three is more serious and melodramatic.

- Kingdom of Fantasinia's Chapter: In this episode of the drama CD, Yggdra (Mai Nakahara) and her forces find themselves lacking the number of generals necessary to confront Bronquia, and so they must seek allies elsewhere. Mistel (Kozue Kamada] recommends that they go to find and ally with Milanor (Miyuki Sawashiro), because she thinks that a noble thief fits the Royal Army's image the best. The Royal Army heads towards the south of the continent, conquering all the other countries in the way, and accidentally winds up battling Milanor's forces after they encounter and get into an argument with Kylier (Yui Sakakibara). Mistel attempts to stop them and remind Yggdra why they came here, but becomes offended when Milanor and Kylier refer to her as "oba-san", and tells Yggdra to defeat them instead. When this is done, Yggdra remembers that they had a reason to come down to this area of the world, but Mistel hurriedly assures her that it's not a big deal.
- Milanor's Thieves' Chapter: This episode follows Milanor, who has been successfully gathering allies but is plagued with bad luck in his choice of cards, which cause Flunky (Katsuya Fujiwara) to desert the army, temporarily transform him and all of his allies into Undines, chests and all, and break all the items he has in his possession. Meanwhile, his childhood friend Kylier attempts to get his romantic attention, and their ally Rosary (Akemi Sato) tries to foil her by pushing Milanor towards Yggdra instead. All of this continually backfires when Milanor's unlucky hand at cards makes things go from bad to worse, and even Yggdra turns on them in the end.
- New Bronquian Empire's Chapter: This chapter focuses mainly on Luciana (Tomoko Fujino), one of the Imperial commanders. She and her twin sister Aegina (Tomoko Fujino) must project the illusion that they are the same person up until Fantasinia is defeated, because otherwise the two of them will be in danger (alluding to certain plot elements of Blaze Union). Luciana, however, is disheartened when she realizes that even her own allies can only tell her apart from Aegina based on their hairstyles and the color of their clothes, and begins to worry that Gulcasa (Hiroaki Miura) might have the same problem. When Eudy (Ai Maeda) discovers this, she decides to try to help Luciana express her individuality by "hinting" that the twins are separate people, and has her equip strange items when going into battle. This eventually upsets Luciana, who starts to worry that Aegina's reputation will be ruined by her behavior, and despite Aegina's reassurance, she becomes angry and rejects her friends' item suggestions in favor of the Golem Suit, beginning to rampage around the fortress. At this time, Gulcasa arrives; unable to understand the bizarre circumstances, he confuses Luciana's antics for a test to see if he can tell who she is. He laughs her off and tells her that no matter what she does, he'll never fall for the twins' disguises because they're individual people, thus laying the issue to rest.
