= Blaze Union =

2010 video game

Blaze Union: Story to Reach the Future
- Developer: Sting
- Publisher: Atlus
- Designers: Hikaru Yasui (Producer); R-Force Entertainment (Scenario); Rui Kousaki (Character Design); Sunaho Tobe (Card Design); Shigeki Hayashi (Composer)
- Series: Dept. Heaven
- Platforms: PlayStation Portable; Nintendo Switch; Android; IOS
- Release: PlayStation Portable: JP: May 27, 2010; Nintendo Switch: JP: April 27, 2023
- Genre: Tactical role-playing game
- Mode: Single player

Blaze Union: Story to Reach the Future is a tactical role-playing game for the PlayStation Portable, developed by Sting Entertainment and published by Atlus, with its scenario written by R-Force Entertainment. It is currently only available in Japanese.

Blaze Union serves as the prequel to Yggdra Union, and shares the same systems with a few minor changes to gameplay. The most notable change is the addition of a mission selection system during two points of the game, which leads up to separate story branches much like a visual novel.

A remaster was released in April 2023 for Nintendo Switch. Mobile versions of the game was also announced and it was set to release for IOS and Android.

== Story ==
Blaze Union takes place three years before Yggdra Union, in the year 1487 M.D., an era that was considered a golden age to the rest of the continent but was a dark age for the empire of Bronquia. Thortie, the current Emperor, was an incompetent ruler who taxed the people heavily to support the army he was attempting to build; the majority of the nobility was corrupt, and bandits plagued the land, preying on the weak and innocent.

In the trade city of Tiera, the youth Garlot had grown up being crushed under the heel of various forms of oppression, from the unfairness of the rich and the nobility to his own father's brutal abuse; he and his friends Siskier and Jenon decided to do what they could to change the ugly reality surrounding them and formed a band of noble thieves in order to protect their fellow poor.

The game begins as Garlot and his band close in on a noble named Norn and the mercenaries he has hired, defeat him with the help of the traveler Medoute, and catch the eye of Landgrave Velleman. The landgrave asks for their help in creating order in Bronquia so that it can be stabilized before it destroys itself, and they join forces; Velleman renames their force Gram Blaze.

From this point on, the story focuses on Gram Blaze's progress in restoring public order, gathering new allies, and gaining notoriety in Bronquia as the protectors of the people. As much as the plot is a medieval fantasy and adventure tale, it is also a slice of life story chronicling the strengthening of the bonds between Gram Blaze's members and providing a portrait of Garlot, the people surrounding him, and the world they live in.

Depending on the choices of the player, the plot can progress in one of three directions, with four possible conclusions. Important themes include comradeship, racism, revenge, and mental-emotional stress and trauma.

== Characters ==
=== Allies ===
Garlot (ガーロット, Gaarotto)
Voiced by: Kōsuke Toriumi
The protagonist of the main story and the leader of Gram Blaze. Garlot is a seventeen-year-old young man born and raised in the slums of Tiera. He desires to become stronger because he has lived all his life faced with everyday injustices resulting from the Emperor's poor government. Garlot was abused by his father when he was a young boy and abandoned by his mother, and he still suffers from the emotional and mental aftereffects. He is notoriously bad-tempered, to the point of forgetting his objectives once angered, but despite this he has a gentle and caring personality that makes him popular amongst his allies. Garlot is extremely protective of his friends and flies into a rage if they are threatened or hurt, particularly Siskier.

Although he himself is not aware of it, "Garlot" is not his real name; it is a false name that his mother gave him in order to seal his demon blood. Over the course of the A path, it is revealed that Garlot is the first pureblooded descendant of the demon god Brongaa to be born in centuries, and his birth name is Gulcasa (ガルカーサ, Garukaasa). In this route of the game, he works to unseal his blood after Siskier's death, and overthrows the government to become the new Emperor, leading to the events of Yggdra Union.

Garlot refuses to eat dairy products, and is also depicted as having trouble eating particularly sweet things, such as strawberries. His allies often call him "Captain" (団長, Danchou). Two of the game's possible endings result in his suffering from posttraumatic stress disorder.

Siskier (シスキア, Shiskia)
Voiced by: Yui Horie
Garlot's childhood friend, and the lead scout of Gram Blaze. The same age as Garlot, she acted as a surrogate mother or older sister to him during their childhood, and encouraged him to play with her and Jenon often so that he would have a place of refuge from his father. It is heavily implied that she has romantic feelings for him, although she is never able to tell him so to his face. Siskier is also implied to be an orphan, and as a fellow resident of Tiera's slums, she has a strong dislike for all nobles and tends to act prejudiced towards them before getting to know them personally.

Possessed of a very cheerful personality, Siskier insists upon wearing tight-fitting clothing that covers little skin because she claims it allows her to move more easily, but makes an exception for scarves, which she loves and will buy whenever she has the chance. She does complain of cold at various points of the game and acknowledges that her attire is not practical protection from the elements.

Siskier has no lead role in any of the paths, but her death in the A route provides the impetus for Garlot to unseal his demon blood.

Jenon (ジェノン, Jenon)
Voiced by: Shinji Kawada
Childhood friend to Garlot and Siskier, and the primary tactician for Gram Blaze. He is the same age as Garlot and Siskier. Jenon has a flair for the dramatic and flirts with every woman he sees, although certain routes reveal that he actually only has feelings for Siskier (a fact of which Garlot is aware, but Siskier herself is not). Jenon is more pessimistic than either Garlot or Siskier and presents himself as far more of a skeptic, and is also more well-read; he is the only one of the three of them who is aware that the world is round, for instance.

Optional events reveal that Jenon is a noble, although he conceals this fact from his friends, and that he ran away from home to join Garlot's battle against class discrimination and the oppression of the weak. His father supports Pandra's rebellion, and so Jenon's parents flee Tiera at the end of chapter 5, after it is attacked. While Jenon is not a lead character, he still has an important role; during the A path, he conspires with Medoute to betray Gulcasa, and during the C path, he sacrifices himself to protect Siskier and Ordene and chooses to die without confessing to Siskier when he realizes that she loves Garlot.

Medoute (メデューテ, Medyuute)
Voiced by: Rie Tanaka
An itinerant traveler who first appears following Garlot's band out of curiosity. She aids them in battle against the mercenary David, but then thoroughly criticizes their reckless methods, insisting that Garlot is not powerful enough or wise enough to enforce his ideals as he is now. When she realizes how much of an impact her words had on him, Medoute decides to join up with Gram Blaze as a way of taking responsibility, and acts as an older sister and mentor to the rest of the group. During chapter 3, she spends many missions impressing her view of morality onto the others.

In every route, it is revealed that Medoute is a descendant of Dragonslayer Gill, the hero who defeated Brongaa in ancient times. She was raised as a dragonslayer, but because she doesn't believe in destiny, she ran away from home and began to travel the world as a way to rebel against her heritage. She mentions that the hermit seen in Yggdra Union's Battlefield 25 is her grandfather, and that she is a resident of Lost Aries, current homeland for exiled Vanir Tribe that was mentioned by Kylier in Yggdra Union. Despite her resentment toward the way she was raised, she still becomes suspicious of Gulcasa and Emilia after discovering their heritage; she betrays Gulcasa in the A path, and if Emilia loses her mind during the B path, she explains that Emilia must now be killed. Her attitude can be viewed as racism against demons, although it is never defined in as many words.

Medoute is twenty-one years old.

Aegina (アイギナ, Aigina)
Voiced by: Mai Nakahara
A fifteen-year-old noble girl who is being pursued by an organization of assassins called the Blessed Papal Army. After she is rescued by Gram Blaze, Aegina and her twin sister Luciana join up with the army for protection, although only Aegina is able to perform in battle due to Luciana having a leg injury. Aegina is extremely polite and has a subdued, serious personality, in contrast to her cheerful and prank-loving older sister; however, she has an intense hatred of the Kingdom of Fantasinia, and becomes vehemently angry whenever it is spoken of.

Aegina is the central character of the B route, which explores her and Luciana's background. The two of them were born as the princesses of Fantasinia, but right after they were born, someone attempted to assassinate them. They were rescued by a soldier and brought to Bronquia, where they were adopted by a Bronquian noble; although they do not know exactly why this happened, Aegina says that it is probably because of the Fantasinian superstition that twins are unlucky. During the B route, Luciana is killed by assassins, and Aegina leads an attack on Fantasinia with the support of Gram Blaze in order to smoke out the culprit. After learning the circumstances of her exile, Aegina is able to kill the one responsible and lay her grudge to rest, choosing to remain in Fantasinia with her family.

Nessiah (ネシア, Neshia)
Voiced by: Tsubasa Yonaga
A mysterious and strange blind man who lives deep in the forest as a hermit and is rumored to be a prophet. Velleman sends Gram Blaze to recruit him as a strategist, and Nessiah consents on the condition that they be able to defeat him in battle. Nessiah is polite and very knowledgeable; he is able to sense Garlot's latent power, but other members of the party are disturbed by Nessiah's talent at necromancy, and Jenon sees him as a rival due to their similar positions. Despite his power and his infamy (Medoute mentions that he had even foretold the death of Ike, the previous emperor), Nessiah has the appearance of a teenage boy. While it is not addressed in this game, Nessiah is a fallen Grim Angel born under the name Aries, and has lived in the world of Ancardia for about a thousand years. He is attempting to perpetuate human wars in order to give power to his artifact the Gran Centurio, which he intends to use to break the shackles binding him and revenge himself upon the gods.

Nessiah's ultimate role in the plot differs based on each route. In the A path, he supports Gulcasa in the wake of Siskier's death and helps him to deal with the debilitating side effects of using his powers, and the two become very close; however, he is also shown encouraging Gulcasa to attack other countries in the future at a time when Gulcasa's mental resistance is low. In the B path, Nessiah takes Velleman's place as the party's voice of reason, and remains benevolent. In the C path, the speedy resolution of all the conflicts sends him into a panic, and leads to his becoming the route's main antagonist while suffering a mental breakdown.

More about Nessiah's motives and background are explored in Yggdra Union and the Dept. Heaven World Guidance book.

Eimi (エイミ, Eimi)
Voiced by: Ai Nonaka
An eleven-year-old girl traveling Bronquia alone in search of her older brother. She is encountered briefly at the beginning of the game, and then not seen again until Chapter 4, where it is discovered that she went to get Nessiah to make a prophecy for her. He tells her cryptically that her brother is imprisoned in a barrier that will keep her from finding him, but that if she travels with Garlot, she will be able to find him sooner; Eimi gets permission to travel with Gram Blaze, then names her brother as Gulcasa, thus revealing herself as Emilia (エミリオ, Emirio) to players of Yggdra Union.

Emilia is Gulcasa's half-sister, and her blood was also sealed by Baretreenu; however, because she is not a pure-blooded descendant of Brongaa, she is not as strong as him, and she still knows her own real name. She reveals her identity in the A path after Garlot discovers the truth about himself, but does not join the active forces; during the B path, she breaks the seal on her blood out of her own desperation to be able to help Garlot and Aegina, as well as her guilt at being unable to save Luciana. During the B route, she displays bloodthirsty traits which may or may not be due to her demon blood, and if the player deploys her too many times, she loses control of her power and goes insane, which causes that route's bad end.

Leon (レオン, Reon)
Voiced by: Takuya Satou
A nineteen-year-old soldier in the Imperial Army. Leon used to be a member of the Imperial Guard, but his parents were executed as scapegoats to prevent a national crisis, after which he was driven from his post by fellow soldiers. His forehead was branded in the process, giving him a large scar there; this incident made him reluctant to place his faith in people. Leon has a very gruff and proud personality, but is deeply loyal to the people he cares about, and becomes embarrassed when others notice this trait.

Gram Blaze initially approaches Leon to see if he will train them in combat, but Garlot decides against this after seeing how harsh Leon is with his soldiers. Leon deliberately angers Garlot and challenges him to a practice battle, and receives a deep emotional shock after losing. He quits his post and winds up allying with Pandra in order to defeat Garlot, but after becoming disillusioned with Pandra as well, he attempts a form of suicide by cop after rescuing his little sister Elena from Pandra's clutches. Garlot rescues him and convinces him not to go through with it, after which he joins Gram Blaze.

This is the first game in which Leon's face is shown. The exact nature of the incident his parents were executed for is unknown; Elena explains that the official explanation is that they breached military protocol. Like Thortie, he often calls Garlot "Redhead"; however, he starts addressing Garlot by name once they join forces.

Velleman (ヴェルマン, Veruman)
Voiced by: Go Shinomiya
A thirty-six-year-old Landgrave, and the ruler of Tiera. He desires to reform Bronquia by force before it collapses from within due to rampant banditry and Thortie's malgovernment. He hires Garlot, Siskier, Jenon, and Medoute in order to start his own private army to defend him from his political enemies and restore public order, and is the one to name their party Gram Blaze, meaning "furious flames". Velleman is depicted as a stoic, and Garlot comes to perceive him as a father figure, striving for his approval even when their viewpoints do not meet.

Like Nessiah, Velleman's role in the story changes in each route. In the A path, Velleman becomes paranoid and uses Baldus' attack on the base as a distraction to capture Siskier while she is scouting. He uses her as a hostage to attempt to force Gram Blaze into killing Garlot, who he believes will eventually turn against him. This results in Siskier killing herself to save Garlot and his own death at the hands of Gram Blaze, which leaves Garlot deeply traumatized. In the B path, Velleman tries to keep Gram Blaze from accompanying Aegina, and is no longer featured in the story after they sneak out. In the C path, Velleman is chosen by Thortie as the first Prime Minister of Bronquia after he announces his intention to abdicate.

One mission reveals that Velleman was once married and has a daughter, although he and his wife have since separated.

=== Enemies ===
Thortie (ソルティエ, Sorutie)
Voiced by: Masayuki Katou
The current Emperor of Bronquia, who is known to have a contract with Brongaa. He succeeded his younger brother, Ike, and is in the process of attempting to re-militarize the country through raising taxes and drafting soldiers, earning the resentment of the people. He is also inept at keeping the peace, leading to the country's problems with banditry and corrupt nobles. Thortie is a skilled general known for his use of two swords, and has a very laid-back personality when not in battle. He is very close to his bodyguard Lapis, and is curious about Garlot because he can sense his hidden power. Due to Garlot's refusal to introduce himself when they first meet, Thortie usually calls him "Redhead" (赤髪, Akagami). He is one of the main antagonists of the A route, but allies with Gram Blaze during the C path and is shown in that ending to be on friendly terms with them. He is 36 years old.

Lapis (ラピス, Lapis)
Voiced by: Chihara Minori
The captain of the Imperial Guard. Lapis has a very stern personality and is extremely protective of Thortie. The two of them have been childhood friends ever since her mother was appointed as Ike's wet-nurse. In-game, her name is often Romanized as "Rapis", although the color palette of her clothes suggests that her name should be evocative of the precious stone lapis lazuli. She is 28 years old.

Ordene (オルディーン, Orudiin)
Voiced by: Tomoyuki Higuchi
Luciana and Aegina's real father, and the 31st sovereign of Fantasinia. He fights for justice and to protect his youngest daughter, Yggdra; he is also the current wielder of Nessiah's sword, the Gran Centurio. Aegina initially believes him to be the one behind Luciana's death and their banishment, but this turns out not to be the case. In the C route, he willingly gives up the Gran Centurio to be sealed after Thortie offers to abdicate the throne in return.

Alanjame (アランゼーム, Aranzeemu)
Voiced by: Naomi Kusumi
An advisor in Ordene's court and the commander of the Blessed Papal Army. He intends to bring about Ordene's death and rule Fantasinia with Yggdra as his figurehead, and ordered Luciana and Aegina disposed of as babies because he feared a war over which of them should succeed the throne upon Ordene's death.

Baretreenu (ベアトリーヌ, Beatoriinu)
Voiced by: Asako Dodo
Garlot's mother. She sealed his blood and eventually Emilia's when the two of them were children, and abandoned Garlot in order to research Brongaa's power, not even returning when she learned that he was being abused. Other characters describe her as seeming very motherly. In the A route, she demands that Garlot battle her to the death for the right to have the seal broken, and tells him that Brongaa's blood turns people into monsters; thus, he must show that he is willing to become a monster by killing his own mother. While reluctant, Garlot is able to do so because he is desperate for the power to prevent any further sacrifice. However, in the C path, where she is summoned by Velleman to treat Thortie's Brongaa-related illness, she joins the party.

Pandra (パンドラ, Pandora)
Voiced by: Tsuguo Mogami
A former member of the Imperial Army who was sacked during the demilitarization of Ike's reign. When Thortie began building up the army again, he became resentful and began to form a rebellion. However, he gradually became corrupt and is little more than a bandit now, pillaging innocent villages and raping townswomen. He resents Garlot for agreeing to work with a noble, and the two of them come into conflict many times, culminating in his attack on Tiera. Pandra is lazy and a coward, preferring to make his men work for him and always fleeing if his own life appears to be in danger.

Cerica (セリカ, Serika)
Voiced by: Haruka Tomatsu
A girl who alternately works as a mercenary and acts as a bandit, part of David's mercenary company. David's death early into the game drives her to attempt to avenge him by killing Garlot, but is unable to do so despite several attempts, and only causes Garlot to feel sorry for her. Cerica speaks in the third person as a way of showing how much she loves her name, which David gave her; it is eventually revealed that David adopted her. Cerica is eventually convinced to stop chasing Gram Blaze either by Baretreenu's lecturing or by Garlot saving her life, depending on the route. She is nineteen years old and likes cherries, and is implied to have an Electra complex towards David.

== Gameplay ==
Ordinarily, the game follows a linear progression of battles. First, an opening cutscene is viewed (often preceded by a narrator's plot synopsis), after which the player is taken to a preparation screen where they may select the units and cards they wish to bring into battle, as well as restore characters' Morale or equipping new items. After this, the player enters the battle proper. Within each battle, units are displayed on a grid of spaces which decide where the characters can move. The player and the computer take turns in which movements are determined and one attack can be executed against an opposing character. The player may choose to end their turn at any time. Once all objectives in a battle are completed, the player is given the option to save, and either the next battle begins or the player will be returned to the mission selection screen.

Medoute explains how cannons function.

=== Union ===
As in Yggdra Union, Unions are the eponymous game play mechanic. Unlike most games, the player is allowed one attack per turn. Attacks are performed in formations called unions. Most unions involve multiple units, but it is possible to attack with a "union" of one unit. Forming unions allows more than one unit to join the battle, allowing for battles between as many as one hundred and twenty soldiers, grouped into up to five individual battles between two units named "duels". Depending on the gender of the unit, the formation required for a union will be different. Males have an x-shaped formation, whereas females have a +-shaped formation. Linked unions, which become available during Chapter 4, allow units within the core union to apply their union pattern to extend the overall union.

==== Units ====
Each unit that can be included in a union is composed of a leader, the "head", and as many as seven underlings, or "members". Each unit has a weapon type, with strengths and weaknesses in a rock-paper-scissors fashion. Each unit comes with six stats: Morale, an indicator with a function similar to hit points; GEN, generality; ATK, attack; TEC, technique; and LUK, luck. Player characters have a seventh statistic called REP, and enemy units' seventh statistic is POW.UP. In comparison to Yggdra Union, REP (or reputation) is no longer a stat based on one out of six; instead, it is shown on the status screen as a percentage of total battles won. POW.UP is a reducible stat that increases card POW upon player victory. Each unit also has the potential for five 'effects', which are strategy altering hooks that do many things, from the in-clash voiding of damage enhanced with a particular element, to out of clash Morale restoration. Up to four effects can be innate to the unit, with one effect coming from the unit's equipped item. Items have two possible uses; they can be equipped for stat-ups and effects, or they can be consumed to recover Morale. Equipped items cannot be removed, and will disappear after a set amount of battlefields.

==== Unit Types ====
There are fourteen base unit types, generally two differently-gendered classes per weapon type (with the exceptions being Axe and Scythe). The basic types are:

- Fencer (sword, male)
- Valkyrie (sword, female)
- Bandit (axe, male)
- Griffon Rider (axe, female)
- AxBattler (axe, female) - new to Blaze Union
- Knight (spear, male)
- Undine (spear, female)
- Necromancer (staff, male)
- Witch (staff, female)
- Hunter (bow, male)
- Assassin (bow, female)
- Golem (lump, genderless)
- Skeleton (lump, genderless)
- Imperial Knight (scythe, male)

There are a number of story characters who possess derivative classes from one of these basic types with slightly different stat growth (Garlot's class is Rabid Knight, Siskier's class is Assault, etc.), Baretreenu's class is based on the Yggdra Union character Mistel, and Nessiah and Eater's classes are entirely unique.

==== Aggression and Rage ====
After the first battlefield has been cleared, the player may control how the character attacks in a clash by changing the Aggression modes, and the enemy's mode of attack will shift with the gradually increasing Rage meter, which has been a series staple since Riviera. When a unit is in Passive mode, Aggression will fill, but the damage the unit deals will be reduced. If there is Aggression in the gauge, the unit can enter Aggressive mode, depleting said Aggression, dealing more damage and also activating the innate element of the unit, if one exists. If Aggression reaches 100%, a card skill can be activated. The enemy's Rage works in a similar way, except that Rage continuously fills until either Max is reached, or is stopped by a skill or effect. When Rage becomes half full, the enemy will enter Rage mode, the damage the enemy deals will increase, and the enemy's innate element, if it has one, will activate. When Rage is completely full, the enemy enters Max mode, damage increases again, and any activated element is removed from damage. In Max mode, the enemy is also able to activate skills. Rage will carry over between clashes in a union based on the outcome of the union; if the enemy loses, all accumulated Rage will carry over, but if the enemy wins it will start empty in the next clash. Player Aggression carries over regardless.

=== Cards ===
==== Skills ====
Each card also has a skill, ranging in effect from restoring allies and killing enemies, to changing the landscape and even invincibility. For these skills to be activated, the Union leader must first match the ACE of the card. In addition, there are two types of skills: Hold and Charge. Charge-type skills require the □ button be held to charge a bar, at which point, if released, the skill will activate and deplete the Aggression gauge. Hold-type skills are activated by pressing □, and holding it for as long as the skill's effects are desired, or until the Aggression gauge is completely depleted. Many skills have certain requirements of their own, such as Steal - which steals any item the enemy might be holding - being usable only by Siskier.

When 100% Aggression or Max Rage mode is reached and all other conditions are met, a skill can be activated. Each skill has a rule or equation for its mechanic; for example, Steal will succeed if the user's TEC is larger than or equal to the target's GEN, otherwise it will fail and the opponent's item will not be stolen. These rules and equations can affect how effective the skill is when used by a certain unit.

==== New Cards ====
Blaze Union features three new cards: "Vise", which raises the entire Union's LUK to full throughout the entire battle; "Rauger", a Skill usable only by Byff which raises the ATK and GEN of all male Union members; and "Insanity", a Skill usable only by Thortie which causes damage and inflicts a random status effect.

=== Mission Selection and Route Division ===
A mechanic new to Blaze Union which was created due to its branching storylines. During chapters 3 and 5 of the story, the player is allowed to choose a certain number of missions to complete out of a large number. All missions cannot be taken in one playthrough. These missions all have different objectives, such as restoring public order or recruiting new allies. Certain missions are connected to the B or C story paths, and by playing through those missions, the player will affect the course of the story. If insufficient B or C path triggers have been seen, the story will continue along the A path, the default and canonical series of events.

== Other changes from Yggdra Union ==
- In battle, there is a new bar underneath the active statistic, which shows the unit head's HP.
- Some cards have been altered. For instance, "Dragon Killer" may only be used by Medoute, "Ace Guard" has been made male-exclusive while "Refreshment" is female-exclusive, and "Reincarnation" now has 10 MOV.
- Instead of having a single dialogue portrait and three in-battle portraits, all characters have at least four full-body portraits which are used during scenes.
- In battle, Skill incantations and various other lines are now voiced, as per requests by the fans.
- All characters other than Emilia, Pamela, and Yggdra now have new voice actors.
- Edible items now only increase statistics by one or two small stars, not one full point.
- The MVP bonus has been changed to that unit's Morale being extended by 300, and the Quick Clear bonus has been changed to a single small star. Stages also now have a set stat that they increase, instead of the bonus being randomized.
- The cast of Blaze Union has much more restrictive taste in food than the cast of Yggdra Union, making equipping edible items more selective.
- There are new equipment restrictions, such as finger size restriction on rings.
- Certain scenes feature cutscene graphics.
- Nessiah's elemental attribute has been changed to "darkness". This is actually a holdover from Yggdra Unison; in the PSP version of Yggdra Union he had no base attribute (this changed based on use of Reincarnation), and in the GBA version his attribute was "lightning".

== Development ==
The first indication that Yggdra Union would receive a prequel was made in the book Dept. Heaven Episodes World Guidance, in a Q&A section where series producer Ito addressed common fan questions. Here, Ito mentioned that there had been a great deal of fan interest in Luciana and Aegina's past, which was never fully explained in Yggdra, and that if a prequel or sequel were ever produced, it would feature the twins' backstory.

The development team for Blaze Union shares many members with Product Team A, but features a different director, writer, and artist. According to interviews, R-Force Entertainment was chosen to write the scenario due to producing many popular fantasy light novels, and Kousaki was chosen for the art to give the game a different feel from Yggdra Union, where one of the major selling points was the gap between Kiyuduki's characteristically "cute" style and the seriousness of the story. The game script went through many edits in order to keep the storyline from becoming too dark, and the game was in production for about three years, although most of the work was done in the half-year after Yggdra Unison entered its final development stages.

Garlot's design is cited by both Kousaki and Yasui as having been problematic, as Sting intended his true identity to remain secret until the end of the canon route of the game. Early sketches depicting him as more muscular and with messy hair were canned because he was too obviously identifiable as Gulcasa, which led to his being given a neater hairstyle. The dragon motifs incorporated in his armor were likewise changed to lions. Further alterations to obfuscate Garlot's design, such as giving him black hair, were proposed but ultimately rejected. Yasui suggests that Pandra (who has reddish-brown hair and pale eyes) may have been intended as a red herring, but admits that Pandra is a little too old to pass as Gulcasa given the year Blaze Union takes place and that in retrospect making the connection between Garlot and Gulcasa was likely very easy.

There are currently no plans for an English language localization of the game.

== Merchandise ==
Like other games in the Dept. Heaven series, a few pieces of Blaze Union merchandise were released. On June 23, 2010, the 59-track original soundtrack was released by Columbia Music Entertainment. The soundtrack contains all 58 musical tracks used in-game, along with a bonus track that features a piano rearrangement of the main theme.

One week later, on June 30, the 192-page strategy guide was released by Softbank Creative, and on August 2, a 128-page artbook called the "Blaze Union Setting Book" was released by the same publisher. The latter contains most, though not all, of the in-game artwork along with a great deal of concept art, including rough artwork of town layouts and the topography of Bronquia; it also features an interview with some of the game's staff.

Additionally, an iTunes-exclusive album called "Blaze Union Battle Theme Collection" was released on June 1, 2011. It comprises tracks 27-55 of the official soundtrack, and includes an extended remix of Garlot's theme.

=== Original soundtrack track list ===
ブレイズ・ユニオン オリジナルサウンドトラック
No.	Title	Length
1.	"Someday's Story (いつの日かの物語, Itsu no Hi ka no Monogatari)"	2:00
2.	"Blaze Union (ブレイズ・ユニオン, Bureizu Yunion)"	0:40
3.	"The Gathered Ones (集いし者達, Tsudoishi Monotachi)"	1:07
4.	"Mad Demons (理不尽の魔物, Rifujin no Mamono)"	1:11
5.	"Signs of Strife (闘争の気配, Tousou no Kehai)"	1:11
6.	"Sally Forth! (いざ出撃!, Iza Totsugeki!)"	1:11
7.	"Believing in Those Bonds (その絆、信じてる, Sono Kizuna, Shinjiteru)"	0:31
8.	"Triumphant Return (凱旋, Gaisen)"	1:13
9.	"The Scent of Peace (平和の匂い, Heiwa no Nioi)"	0:48
10.	"Steady Conviction (揺ぎない信念, Yuruginai Shinnen)"	0:38
11.	"Bitter Enemy (仇敵, Kyuuteki)"	0:37
12.	"Violated Peace (侵された平穏, Okasareta Heion)"	0:42
13.	"Overflowing Tears (涙こぼれて, Namida Koborete)"	0:34
14.	"Right in the Middle of History (歴史のただ中で, Rekishi no Tada Naka de)"	0:59
15.	"Fireworks (火花, Hibana)"	1:11
16.	"Breakthrough (打開策, Dakaisaku)"	1:11
17.	"Peril (危地, Kichi)"	1:10
18.	"Power for Whose Sake (誰がための力, Taga Tame no Chikara)"	1:14
19.	"The Soldiers' Prized Godspeed (兵は神速を貴ぶ, Hei wa Shinsoku wo Tattobu)"	1:14
20.	"Pushing the Limit (限界の果てに, Genkai no Hate ni)"	1:07
21.	"Mighty Fortress (堅固なる城砦, Kengonaru Jousai)"	1:09
22.	"The Final Battle Approaches (決着の時、来たる, Ketchaku no Toki, Kitaru)"	1:37
23.	"Boiling Flesh and Blood (沸き立つ血肉, Wakitatsu Ketsuniku)"	0:53
24.	"Covetous Impulse (貧欲なる衝動, Donyakunaru Shoudou)"	0:52
25.	"never"	0:48
26.	"The Road that God has Given Us (天意が示す道, Teni ga Shimesu Michi)"	0:41
27.	"Furious Flames (怒れる炎, Ikareru Honoo)"	1:41
28.	"At Least a Flower for My Heart (せめて心に花を, Semete Kokoro ni Hana wo)"	1:35
29.	"The Limit of Wit (機知の行方, Kichi no Yukue)"	1:35
30.	"Powerful Conviction (強くある覚悟, Tsuyoku aru Kakugo)"	1:37
31.	"Youth Knows No Sin (幼さは罪を知らず, Osanasa wa Tsumi wo Shirazu)"	1:29
32.	"Why I Wield This Sword (剣を振るう理由, Ken wo Furuu Riyuu)"	1:24
33.	"A Play of Pawns (掌中の劇場, Shouchuu no Gekijou) [lit. "Palmtop Theatre"]"	1:39
34.	"A Question of Values (価値観の問題, Kachikan no Mondai)"	1:32
35.	"Bravely, If Roughly (荒ぶれば勇ましく, Abureba Izamashiku)"	1:23
36.	"Fly the Colors (はためく軍機, Hatameku Gunki)"	1:27
37.	"Run Through the Night (夜が走る, Yoru ga Hashiru)"	1:51
38.	"Battle Cry (鬨の声, Toki no Koe)"	1:34
39.	"Wager Your Dignity (威信に賭けて, Shishin ni Kakete)"	1:30
40.	"Summit (頂, Itadaki)"	1:35
41.	"Will This Finish Everything!? (これで万事解決!?, Kore de Banji Kaikatsu!?)"	1:33
42.	"The Legendary Drunken Master (酔っ払い最強伝説, Yopparai Saikyou Densetsu)"	1:05
43.	"Witch's Dance (魔女のダンス, Majo no Dansu)"	1:22
44.	"NanTutTe"	1:17
45.	"Powerfully, Fleetingly, Peacefully (強く儚く鮮やかに, Tsuyoku Hakanaku Odayaka ni)"	1:23
46.	"Ever-Questing Heart (飽くなき探究心, Akunaki Tankyuu Kokoro)"	1:23
47.	"Slave to Avarice (強欲のとりこ, Gouyoku no Toriko)"	1:38
48.	"Freezing Astral Sword (魔剣は冴え渡り, Maken wa Saewatari)"	1:17
49.	"The King's Ambition (王者の覇気, Oumono no Haki)"	1:40
50.	"Absolute Wisdom (無謬の叡智, Mubyuu no Eichi)"	1:15
51.	"Encroachment (侵食, Shinshoku)"	1:27
52.	"Disobedience is a Sin (逆らえばそれは罪, Sakaraeba Sore wa Tsumi)"	1:16
53.	"Grave Injury (害悪, Gaiaku)"	1:22
54.	"Offering for the Homeland (祖国に捧ぐ, Sokoku ni Sosogu)"	1:16
55.	"The Temptation of Evil (魔の魅惑, Ma no Miwaku)"	1:31
56.	"The Meaning of This Power (手にした力の意味, Te ni Shita Chikara no Imi)"	1:45
57.	"Story to Reach the Future (未来へと到る物語, Mirai e to Itaru Monogatari)"	1:37
58.	"The Battle Continues... (戦いは続く…, Tatakai wa Tsudzuku...)"	3:22
59.	"Fleeting Feelings (儚き想い, Hakanaki Omoi)"	2:15
