= Yggdra Union =

2006 video game

Yggdra Union: We'll Never Fight Alone
- Developer: Sting
- Publishers: JP: Sting; NA: Atlus; EU: 505 Games; WW: Sting (Windows)
- Designer: Shinichi Ito
- Artists: Satoko Kiyuduki; Sunaho Tobe
- Writer: Nobuhiko Matsumura
- Series: Dept. Heaven
- Platforms: Game Boy Advance; PlayStation Portable; Android; iOS; Nintendo Switch; Windows
- Release: Game Boy Advance: JP: March 23, 2006; NA: November 21, 2006; EU: February 28, 2007; PlayStation Portable: JP: January 24, 2008; NA: September 16, 2008; Android, iOS: JP: April 11, 2019; Nintendo Switch: JP: March 5, 2020; WW: July 27, 2023; Windows: WW: July 27, 2023
- Genre: Tactical role-playing
- Mode: Single player

Yggdra Union: We'll Never Fight Alone (Note: Japanese: ユグドラ・ユニオン, Hepburn: yugudora yunion) is a tactical role-playing game for the Game Boy Advance and PlayStation Portable, developed by Sting Entertainment as the second episode of the Dept. Heaven saga of games. Atlus USA localized and published both versions of the game in North America. 505 Games published the Game Boy Advance version in a limited number of European countries, such as Italy and France. An updated version with bonus features was released in Japan for mobile platforms and Nintendo Switch in April 2019 and March 2020, respectively. A Windows version was released in early access on February 6, 2023, with a full release following on July 27, 2023, alongside a western release for Nintendo Switch.

The game is a tactical RPG with an overhead view of a 2D map, managing miniature versions of the units. A card system dictating unit movement and potential skills plays into both enemy and ally turns, as well as the "Union" formation system, in which massive battles can take place between several platoons. There are also some real time elements included during actual battle sequences, such as being able to control how units attack the enemy.

It was followed by three spin-offs: Yggdra Unison (2007), Blaze Union (2010), and Gloria Union (2011).

== Gameplay ==
The game follows a linear succession of battles. Within each battle, units are displayed on a grid of spaces which decide where the characters can move. The player and the computer take turns in which movements are determined and one attack can be executed against an opposing character. The player may choose to end their turn at any time. Unions are the eponymous game play mechanic. Unlike most games, the player is allowed one attack per turn. Attacks are performed in formations called unions. Most unions involve multiple units, but it is possible to attack with a "union" of one unit. Forming unions allows more than one unit to join the battle, allowing for battles between as many as eighty soldiers, grouped into up to five individual battles between two units named 'clashes'. Depending on the gender of the unit, the formation required for a union will be different. Males have an x-shaped formation, whereas females have a plus-shaped formation. Linked unions, which become available during the fifteenth battlefield, allow units within the core union to apply their union pattern to extend the overall union.

Each unit that can be included in a union is composed of a leader, the head, and as many as seven underlings, or 'members'. For example, in the case of Yggdra's unit, Yggdra is the head, and her five members are Sword Maidens. Each unit has a weapon type, with strengths and weaknesses in a rock-paper-scissors fashion. Each unit comes with six stats: Morale, an indicator with a function similar to Hit points; GEN, generalcy; ATK, attack; TEC, technique; and LUK, luck. The final stat depends on alignment of the unit. Player units have REP, reputation, measuring victory rates, and enemy units have POW.UP, which is a reducible stat that increases card POW upon player victory. Each unit also has the potential for five 'effects', which are strategy altering hooks that do many things, from the in-clash voiding of damage enhanced with a particular element, to out of clash Morale restoration. Up to four effects can be innate to the unit, with one effect coming from the unit's equipped item. Items are multi-purpose in Yggdra Union; they can be equipped for stat ups and effects, or they can be consumed to recover Morale. Equipped items cannot be removed, and will disappear after a set number of battlefields.

Players choose a card at the beginning of each turn. Each card also has a skill, ranging in effect from restoring allies and killing enemies, to changing the landscape and even invincibility. Each card has three attributes—power, ace, and movement:

- POW is the overall strength of the card and factors into how much damage the loser of a clash takes. The higher the power, the more damage the enemy will take.
- ACE is what weapon type the Union leader must use to allow the skill held by the card to be usable. If the ACE is sword, a sword user must start the Union. If it is All, then anyone can start the union.
- MOV is the total movement available to all characters. For example, when a card with five MOV is picked, five characters can each move a single space, one character can move five spaces, or any other combination.

== Plot ==
=== Story ===
The story of Yggdra Union starts with the Princess of Fantasinia, Yggdra, fleeing her besieged home with the family heirloom, the Holy Sword Gran Centurio. Throughout the story, the idea that justice lies with the Holy Sword is used to drive Yggdra and her army forward through their plight, as well as to provide explanation to them for the acts they commit. It is constantly used as justification for their acts, particularly those situations in which civilians are slaughtered during the war.

The story mainly details Yggdra's reclamation of her kingdom from the Bronquian Empire, and her eventual uniting of the entire world under her sovereignty, with quite a few stops along the way leading to an intricate and involving plot. The ending is split off based on the player's actions, one ending essentially being a game over and the other two being open ended with Yggdra either pursuing the ideal that justice lies with the holy sword, or sacrificing it to achieve universal peace.

In the PSP version, additions were made to the story that further develop the Dept. Heaven universe and story, deeply tying the game into mythological elements first developed by Riviera, with the more direct appearance of Diviners, and Grim Angels, and passing mention of Malice, Hector and The Seven Magi. With the events of Yggdra Union's PSP ending where the Royal Army attack Ragnarok, this is now cemented into the canon storyline, marking Yggdra Union as a prequel to Riviera: The Promised Land.

=== Characters ===
Yggdra Union features a large cast of characters, the most important of which is the seventeen-year-old princess, Yggdra Yuril Artwaltz, whose plight is the center of the story. The lead male of the story is Milanor, the seventeen-year-old thief king; The Silver Wolf, whose home was burned down by the Empire in an attempt to find Yggdra. These two start and lead the Royal Army to take back the Kingdom from the Empire. One ally they recruit is Durant, the twenty-four-year-old leader of the Third Cavalry, a knight of Paltina. Nietzsche, the twelve-year-old, naïve Undine from Embellia joins the Royal Army to gain revenge on the Empire for their espionage in her country, as well as to search for the Transmigragem. Twenty-one-year-old Necromancer Roswell of the Branthese house and nineteen-year-old Witch Rosary of the Esmeralda house are met in Verlaine Hills, one of which will join the Royal Army for revenge on the Empire's involvement and betrayal in Verlaine and to recover the Ankhs, the other of which will die at the hands of the Royal Army. Kylier is a seventeen-year-old Griffon Rider from Lost Aries, with an affection for Milanor, who never really joins the Royal Army, but assists them when they need help most. She rides her Griffon Al into battle. The Astral Fencer, the twenty-five-year-old Russell betrays the Empire and joins the Royal Army for revenge for his fiancée Flone, and to repay the Royal Army for his actions against them. Cruz is a twenty-two-year-old hunter, who made it to number one on the Empire's Most Wanted List for his leadership of the Karona Resistance and joins the Royal Army after his headquarters is tracked down and attacked by Mizer. Elena is the sixteen-year-old Assassin that joined the Empire for a chance to stop her brother, Leon, to restore honor to her family, and when her betrayal becomes clear, and the Royal Army aids her, she joins to repay her debt to them. Gordon, of the Temple Knights of Welheim is another ally to the Royal Army, albeit only for a short time. He joins when the Royal Army offers assistance in saving the Pope.

The Empire contains many characters, too, starting with the twenty-year-old Bronquian Emperor, Gulcasa. A descendant of Brongaa, and seeker of his resurrection, Gulcasa took the Empire in a violent coup d'état, and immediately began conquering neighboring countries. Despite his violence, he has full support of the Bronquian people. His direct subordinates, the eighteen-year-old Twin Valkyries Aegina Eine Artwaltz and Luciana Rune Artwaltz, apparently of Royal lineage, make constant attempts on the Royal Army, Yggdra in particular. Leon is the first introduced of the five Dragon Generals, twenty-two-year-old brother to Elena, he is called the Black Knight for his excessively wanton violence and cruelty. Emilia, a Dragon General titled the Scarlet Princess, is half-sister to Gulcasa through a shared father. She abhors being labeled a child, and will do anything to defend Bronquia. Baldus, the Dragon General known as the God of War, is an older, wiser, yet extremely powerful warrior of Ishnad. The last of the Dragon Generals is Nessiah, the Imperial Army's war strategist, truthfully a Fallen Angel igniting wars to enrich the Gran Centurio with which to take revenge on the Gods. Eudy, the twenty-eight-year-old Court Magician, is another high ranking general in the Imperial army, and the cause of many cannon woes.

The game features many more characters, both enemy and otherwise that further delineate the story and lengthen the quest. The PSP version added a few new characters, including an elderly man named Bly, a woman named Mistel, a woman named Pamela, and an angelic figure referred to simply as #367. The PSP version added also full voice acting.

== Development ==
Yggdra Union had a small development team, consisting of less than 25 members. Shinichi Ito, director and designer of Riviera, played the same developmental role in Yggdra Union. Also reprising their roles are composers and sound designers Minako Adachi and Shigeki Hayashi. Masanori Ishikawa, one of Riviera's programmers, returned to be one of the two Yggdra Union programmers. Riviera's character designer, Sunaho Tobe, managed the card illustrations, with Satoko Kiyuduki taking on character design. Sting also contracted Atlus USA to write English text for the Japanese version's script.

The game started development in early 2005 under the project name "YGG", with the official unveiling to the public being in October 2005 through Famitsu and Sting's official site. The game changed quite a bit throughout its development. In early designs, the GEN stat did not exist, characters instead being assigned LDS and INT stats, as well as a "FREEZE" status effect that did not make it into the final version. Also in these early designs, the character art was incomplete, leading the designers to resort to the recycling of Riviera resources during development. In the first released screenshots, it can be seen that Aggression functioned in reverse, the directional buttons coinciding more literally with the change in Aggression produced by their manipulation, rather than symbolically. The cards were initially shown to have a great deal more MOV, along with the much larger maps.

There were some problems in Yggdra Union's development. One such situation was a worry that they would not be able to fit all of the data onto the cartridge, but Sting okayed the release of the game on a larger cartridge, alleviating any space problems. The largest problem was character design. Many different character designs were produced, but the creators of the game had difficulty agreeing on which ones to use.

=== Ports ===
The PSP version, also initially revealed by Famitsu and soon after confirmed by Sting, was given many new features, including completely redrawn sprites and new characters, as well as modified game mechanics such as increased unit capacity, and an animated opening cutscene previewed on the development blog. Other changes include new story sequences following one of the endings of the game, returning character Pamela as playable, a hard mode, new status effects attached to several skills, as well as new cards and battlefields.

A remastered version featuring various quality-of-life adjustments, including an easier difficulty setting and battle speed options, was released for Android and iOS on April 11, 2019, and for Nintendo Switch on March 5, 2020, both exclusive to Japan. A Windows port was released worldwide through Steam on February 6, 2023. Though it released as an early access title, it was content-complete from the start. The full release, planned for later 2023, only aims to fix found bugs and improve the experience based on player feedback. The Windows version entered full release on July 27, 2023. The Nintendo Switch version was also released in the west on the same day.

=== Localization ===
Following the surprising success of Riviera: The Promised Land, Atlus USA was quick to take the opportunity to end "on a high" on the GBA by localizing Yggdra Union. This decision caused the release to be pushed back as Atlus USA announced more GBA games such as Summon Night: Swordcraft Story and Super Robot Taisen: Original Generation. This also led to the game being missed by many.

Yggdra Union was a particularly difficult game to localize due to the stylistic presentation. Characters have effects, innate abilities attached to them. These effects are formatted in such a way that in the Japanese version of the game, there was only room for seven characters of a 10-pixel-tall font. Nich Maragos, lead editor in the localization effort, notes such difficulties as the extreme text constraints, as well as Atlus USA's busy release lineup leaving Yggdra Union short on staff. Atlus USA's localization of the PSP version was released on September 16, 2008.

When Atlus released the English version of Yggdra Union, the bath scene was more explicit than the Japanese counterpart. Not only was a key piece of foliage blocking the scene removed and the lighting softened, but two dialogue faces were replaced (in the Extra Contents section, there are two slots for these faces, which must be unlocked through the scene, but no actual artwork can be seen). The Japanese PSP version also contains a censored version of the bath scene, however significantly more is revealed. Nich Maragos has explained that he had "softened" a character's line in one of the tutorials during editing due to it being out-of-character and therefore potentially damaging to the audience's perception of said character. He explained that it is his job to "remain faithful to the spirit of the game, not the letter, and the most important thing is to make sure everyone in the game sounds natural."

== Release ==
Relatively little merchandise for Yggdra Union has been released, in contrast to the large quantities for Riviera. This is despite the fact that Sting has posted a survey asking what types of merchandise fans would like, as well as the varied results collected. The Perfect Audio Collection Plus was in the works before the survey was ever released, however, because Sting was certain that an official soundtrack would be a popular request.

- Character Making Card: A card featuring concept art and information on Yggdra. Packaged in the limited GBA pre-order box.
- Yggdra Full Metal Strap: A metal keychain with Yggdra's likeness carved out and "We'll never fight alone" engraved. Packaged in the limited GBA pre-order box.
- Yggdra Union Poster: A B1-sized promotional poster. Only ten were made and they were given away in a drawing held by Sting.
- Yggdra Union Official Guide Book: A guide book for the game. Released on April 21, 2006.
- Yggdra Union Perfect Audio Collection Plus: A two-disc soundtrack featuring all of the music from the game. Released on April 21, 2006.
- Yggdra Union The Complete Guide: A guide book updated for the PSP version of the game, featuring a large amount of artwork and interviews. Released on February 23, 2008.
- Yggdra Union Anthology Comic: A collection of comics based upon Yggdra Union, drawn by various artists. Released on March 31, 2008.
- Yggdra Union PSP Version Official Soundtrack: A one-disc soundtrack featuring all tracks used in the PSP version of the game, including the new remixes of all battle tracks and the opening theme. Released on June 23, 2010.
- Yggdra Union March Theme Collection: An iTunes-exclusive album featuring all overworld themes from the game. It includes an extended remix of the title theme. Released May 4, 2011.
- Yggdra Union Battle Theme Collection: As with the above, an iTunes-exclusive album featuring the PSP version battle themes. It includes an extended remix of the unit demo theme. Released May 4, 2011.

Aside from physical merchandise, Sting has also released a large amount of Yggdra Union download content for their mobile service Sting Station (スティング☆ステーション, sutingu suteeshon), such as calendars and wallpapers featuring artwork from the game, ringtones based on soundtrack themes, and even several games that can be downloaded and played.

=== Soundtrack ===
Yggdra Union has an extensive soundtrack, totaling nearly sixty tracks co-composed by Shigeki Hayashi and Minako Adachi. This near-half division of effort left Shigeki Hayashi mostly with character themes and promotional music, and Minako Adachi with the story, map and menu music. The soundtrack is an entirely original composition, except for the song Heaven's Gate (ヘヴンズゲート, hevunzugeto), which is explained to be a bell-heavy arrangement of the Riviera song Heaven's Gate (ヘヴンズゲート, hevunzugeto). Aside from the music, the audio in the GBA version of Yggdra Union is fairly standard, with sound effects in battle and beeping for text of a pitch based on the character speaking. There is no voice acting in the GBA version, but, despite that fact, one of the many fan demands since even before its release is a Drama CD.

A third of Yggdra Union's soundtrack is dominated by Shigeki Hayashi-composed character themes, which are important in the presentation of the battles. When a clash starts, the attacker's theme song is the background music used for the entirety of the clash, and, when a player-controlled character is the attacker, the pacing of the music is dictated by the mode; in Aggressive, the music will speed up, in Passive the music will slow down, and when Neutral the music will play normally.

The first official compilation of the Yggdra Union soundtrack was the Yggdra Union Perfect Audio Collection Plus, released a month after the GBA version's Japanese release. The collection is made up of two discs, the original BGM containing songs directly from the GBA version of the game, and the image BGM containing instrumented versions of the songs. The compilation also contains six bonus songs, one being a collage of the battle themes and appearing at the end of the original BGM, and the other five being arrangements of various tracks, placed at the end of the image BGM. In the soundtrack insert is a large amount of artwork, as well as notes from Shinichi Ito, Minako Adachi and Shigeki Hayashi on the soundtrack itself, and notes on each song's instrumentation, design and implementation.

Upon the release of the "Sting the BEST" version of the game, however, another soundtrack was produced in Japan, compiling the new orchestrations of the PSP battle themes along with the "image BGM" versions of Adachi's tracks, which were used in the PSP version of the game.

== Reception ==
Reception

Aggregate score
Aggregator	Score	
Aggregator	GBA	PSP
Metacritic	77 of 100	73 of 100

Review scores
Publication	Score	
Publication	GBA	PSP
Destructoid	N/A	9 of 10
Eurogamer	5 of 10	N/A
Famitsu	35 of 40	N/A
Game Informer	7.25 of 10	N/A
GamePro	N/A	5 of 5
GameSpot	8 of 10	5.5 of 10
GameSpy	N/A	3.5 of 5
GameZone	N/A	8.3 of 10
IGN	7.8 of 10	7.7 of 10
Nintendo Power	7.5 of 10	N/A
PlayStation: The Official Magazine	N/A	3.5 of 5
411Mania	N/A	8.3 of 10

Award
Publication	Award
Famitsu	Reader's Top 100 Games of 2006

The Game Boy Advance version received "favorable" reviews, while the PSP version received "average" reviews according to video game review aggregator Metacritic.

In Japan, the GBA version tied in fortieth place in Famitsu's Reader's Top 100 Games of 2006 and was given a score of one nine, one ten, and two eights, for a total of 35 out of 40. However, the game was unable to break the top ten, debuting in thirteenth place in national sales. Despite this, when Yggdra Union was released in Japan, GBA sales saw a noticeable spike, a potential correlation noted by GamesAreFun. The PSP version managed to top out at ninth place in its first week, with sales of 17,304.

== Legacy ==
On March 1, 2007, Sting released to their Sting Station download service a platformer starring Nietzsche, titled Nietzsche's Treasure Hunt (ニーチェの宝探し, niiche no takara sagashi). The game features Nietzsche swimming through aquatic levels and collecting treasure.

Not long after the announcement of the PSP remake of Yggdra Union, a larger mobile phone game effort was released called Yggdra Unison: Beat Out Our Obstacle (ユグドラ・ユニゾン, yugudora yunizon). The game features a territory conquering system similar to that found in games like Emperor: Battle for Dune. There are eleven armies vying for 36 territories in the game, each taking a turn in which they can attack a neighboring territory, potentially conquering it and thus increasing their presence on the continent. In battle, characters move around in real time, and when two opposing enemies encounter each other, a skirmish more similar to those found in Fire Emblem is initiated, with the units attacking each other. With proper timing a Unison attack can be activated, in which all allies within a circular range of the skirmish will also engage. The cards featured in the original Yggdra Union are also activated within skirmishes. A Nintendo DS port of this game was released in Japan in December 2009.

JaJa's blog had featured discussion and photos of Yggdra Unison (code-named "YZ") for several months before the official announcement. The game was officially announced at the end of November 2007, and released in early December of that same year.

In January 2008, Sting released two more download games, Milanor Dash! (ミラノダッシュ！, mirano dasshu!) and Yggdra×Quiz×Union (ユグドラ×クイズ×ユニオン, yugudora×kuizu×yunion), the former being a falling-item collection game featuring Milanor, and the latter being a quiz game featuring questions about the game's story and mechanics. In May 2008, yet another download game was released, Yggdra Puzzle (ユグドラ・パズル, yugudora pazuru), a falling block puzzle game.

In May 2010, a prequel concerning the events of Gulcasa's ascension to power in Bronquia was released in Japan. The game was published by Atlus and features a new scenario writer and new character designer, although many staff members between the two games remain the same. As its subtitle, "Story to Reach the Future", suggests, Blaze Union has three branching story paths which allow the player to attempt to find a different future for the Imperial Army and avert the events of Yggdra Union entirely.
