= Riviera: The Promised Land =

2002 video game

- Developer: Sting Entertainment
- Publishers: JP: Sting Entertainment; NA: Atlus; EU: 505 Games; AU: 505 Games
- Designers: Shinichi Ito (Game Design), Sunaho Tobe (Character Design) (GBA and PSP versions)
- Series: Dept. Heaven
- Platforms: WonderSwan Color; Game Boy Advance; PlayStation Portable; Microsoft Windows; Nintendo Switch iOS; Android
- Release: WonderSwan Color: JP: July 12, 2002; Game Boy Advance: JP: November 25, 2004; NA: June 28, 2005; PlayStation Portable: JP: November 22, 2006; NA: July 10, 2007; JP: October 18, 2007 (Special Edition); EU: April 4, 2008; AU: May 8, 2008; Windows: WW: July 16, 2024
- Genre: Role-playing
- Mode: Single player

Riviera: The Promised Land (Note: Riviera: The Promised Land (リヴィエラ ～約束の地リヴィエラ～, Riviera: Yakusoku no Chi Riviera)) is a 2002 role-playing video game developed by Sting Entertainment. It was originally released for WonderSwan Color as the first episode of the Dept. Heaven series of games. It was later ported to Nintendo's Game Boy Advance in 2004, which Atlus USA released in North America in 2005. An enhanced remake was released for the PlayStation Portable in November 2006, and was released in July 2007 in North America by Atlus USA. In July 2023, an HD remaster was announced for Microsoft Windows, Nintendo Switch, iOS and Android. The HD remaster released for Windows in July 2024.

The player takes the role of Ein, a Grim Angel, who must battle against demons as well as antagonistic Grim Angels to seal away the four entities of evil known as the Accursed. He is accompanied by four heroines—Fia, Lina, Serene and Cierra—as well as his cat-like familiar Rose. Riviera also contains dating sim elements, as the hero can achieve multiple endings with the supporting characters through decisions made throughout the game.

== Gameplay ==
Riviera: The Promised Land is a turn-based role-playing video game, with some elements from strategy and dating sim games. The last aspect manifests itself in the conversation in the game. Ein will often have to favor either Fia, Lina, Serene or Cierra over the others in scenes in which the characters interact with each other. This affects their trust for Ein, their mood, and eventually, the game's outcome.

For each of the seven main chapters of the game, the player starts in Elendia, and is given a mission. The player then moves on to wherever that mission takes place, proceeding through nine stages, to the eighth stage which will contain the chapter boss. The ninth stage is secret, and often has a particular method of infiltration. Within each stage are multiple screens, all with events and battles of their own. When a chapter is completed, all trigger points currently accumulated are erased. The player is taken to a results screen showing how they performed in the chapter, and gains trigger points based on that performance that can be used in the next chapter.

=== Field ===
Unlike most RPGs, when not in battle, the player does not have full control over Ein's movement. Instead of being able to freely move with directional buttons, the player controls Ein through triggers, in two modes. Each stage is made up of several screens, each screen having triggers to explore and potentially battles to engage in.

Look Mode

In Look Mode, the player may press directional buttons corresponding to triggers shown on the screen. Some triggers will not appear until certain events have taken place, and some triggers will change based on repeated investigation. However, many triggers require TP, Trigger Points, earned in battle. These triggers can cue many things, from battles, to event scenes and free items.

Move Mode

In Move Mode, the player may advance or backtrack (limited) to previous screens. In a similar fashion to Look Mode, triggers will appear on the screen and a corresponding directional button must be pressed to move to them, adding a turn to the count. Unlike Look Mode, however, triggers in Move Mode do not require Trigger Points, so one may move as much as one likes, assuming there is no turn limit. Once the player has exited the final screen of a stage, the player will be prompted to save and then move on to the next stage.

=== Battle ===
A typical combat scene: The OverDrive Gauge can be seen in the top-left corner. (GBA version)

Before a battle begins, the player usually has the choice to retreat, giving them time to prepare. For every battle, the player may choose only three combatants out of a possible five, and a positioning scheme for them. The player can either choose the Attack or Magic formation. The Attack formation allows Attack based moves a shorter recharge time, and there will be two characters in the front row, and a single character in the back row. In Magic formation, Magic users have a shorter recharge time and positioning is reversed. Following that decision the player must choose the items to bring. Only sixteen items can be held at any time, and there are no methods of storage. The player may only bring four of those sixteen items into battle for all three characters to use. However, for every item, each character has a different attack; where, with a staff, Cierra might do great damage with a magical attack, Fia would heal an ally.

Once all the preparations are made, battle begins. Turn order is decided by a countdown based on agility, last move used and formation. A player character may select from as many as eight different skills: one normal skill for each item, and, if they are well trained with that item and the OverDrive Gauge is sufficiently filled, a secondary, more interesting OverSkill. Using a skill, however, reduces how many more times that item can be used, as Riviera employs a Fire Emblem-styled system of item endurance allowing the item to be used only a certain number of times before it breaks entirely. The OverDrive Gauge fills throughout battle, as characters receive and deal damage, and with certain skills. At various levels, characters can use different skills, because certain skills require more of the gauge be filled. There are five levels of skills for player characters: Level 0 skills that may be used whenever and without training; Levels 1 through 3 skills, which require training and deplete that amount of the OverDrive Gauge; and Execution Level skills that may be used at any level of OverDrive Gauge fullness, but will shatter the gauge for the battle, and are only obtained through the story. Enemies have a similar gauge with three levels: Normal, Rage and Max. At Normal they may only use normal attacks. At Rage they may use Rage and Normal attacks, but the latter depletes the gauge. At Max, they may use all three, but only Max skills will deplete the gauge, and will deplete it fully. Enemies also have Etc. attacks, ranging from healing to transformation, that may be used at any time.

Once all allies have had their HP depleted to zero, the battle will end triggering a Game Over, which will give the player the option to retry the battle with the enemies' stats lowered and the OverDrive Gauge filled. If all enemies have had their HP deplete to zero, instead, the player will achieve victory and receive a rank based on their performance in battle. The rank is based both on time spent in battle and the finisher, but the rank will also be lowered if the player retried. Trigger Points and items are distributed based on the rank the player obtained in the battle. Also, if a character used an item enough times, that character will be rewarded with a stat up and the unlocking of an OverSkill that can be used in later battles.

== Plot ==
Riviera: The Promised Land draws from diverse mythologies, most prominently Norse, incorporating concepts such as Ragnarök and Yggdrasil into its story. The game takes place mostly on the continent of Riviera, with the characters visiting various locales such as a sinking city, a forest, and an abandoned cemetery.

=== Characters ===
Riviera offers a cast of six playable characters.

Ein (エクセル, Ekuseru; Ecthel in the Japanese version) is a Grim Angel, who sacrificed his black wings in order to receive his Diviner, Einherjar. He wears shorts, a vest, gloves, a cape and a scarf; he has grey-black hair and deep blue eyes. He appears to be an average teenage boy and is quite naive, an attribute that annoys both his partners Ledah and Rose. In battle, his primary weapons are swords.

Fia (フィア, Fia) is a teenage girl with a caring personality. She wears a long green skirt, and a black vest over a long-sleeved white blouse. She has long green hair tied with a matching ribbon and green eyes. Originally, she shared a house with Lina, but later made room for Ein, Cierra and Serene. She is, like Ein, kind and noble, sometimes stern and serious, and she can cook and mix herbs well, along with being the only character with healing spells. She is extremely mature, despite being the youngest of Ein's four female companions. Sometimes Fia shows signs of shyness toward others, especially Ein, for whom she nurses a soft spot. In battle, her primary weapons are rapiers and swords.

Lina (ルゥリ, Rūri; Lyuri in the Japanese version) is a sweet, childlike and energetic teenage girl. She wears a flamboyant yellow short-skirt and overcoat. She has brown eyes and orange hair tied into pigtails. Lina enjoys eating, going on adventurous treasure hunts and playing lively games with her friends; she is ignorant about household chores. She constantly gets into situations in which she embarrasses herself, especially around Ein, for whom she hosts a secret infatuation. Her primary weapon in battle are bows and other long range weapons.

Serene (セレネ, Serene) is an outgoing, tomboy-ish teenage girl, the same age as Ein. She is an Arc, unlike the majority of the inhabitants of Riviera, who are Sprites. She used to live on Rosalina Island with other Arcs until her entire tribe was killed by the Grim Angel Malice. She alone survives and joins Ein, for whom she develops an infatuation. Serene has large, batlike wings, a trait shared by Arcs. She wears a helmet adorned with a pair of fake cat ears on her shoulder-length dark blue/indigo hair and has blue eyes. She wears a long pale blue vest over a black body-suit and a dark blue shawl. In battle, her primary weapons are scythes and other pole-arms.

Cierra (シエラ, Shiera) is a kind, thoughtful witch. She is the older sister figure of the group and possesses amazing magical powers. She is always optimistic but sometimes clumsy. She rescued Rose after she and Ein were separated, although she accidentally fed her a potion that removed Rose's ability to talk. For enjoyment, she studies and plays with magic. Cierra wears a typical witch's conical hat, red boots, and a revealing, serrated red dress. Her primary weapons in battle are staves and other magical weapons.

Ledah (レダ, Reda) is an experienced warrior and one of three Grim Angels shown in the game. He is a strong, loyal, and very solitary man. It is suggested that he is much older than Ein and his companions, given his experience, and the choice of voice actors for him in the GBA and PSP remakes, but this is debatable. He follows the order of the seven Magi without question. This is because he traded his emotions for his Diviner, Lorelei, preventing him from reconsidering the orders given to him. Ledah is shown as aloof, cynical, and pragmatic.

The above characters are the only playable characters in the game. Riviera has several dozen supporting characters, notably Rose (Ein's familiar); Hector (the game's main villain); Malice (grim angel and Hector's henchwoman); Ursula, guardian spirit of Riviera; and the Four Accursed, who act as Stage bosses. There are also numerous Elendian citizens, fairies and undines who help Ein along the way.

=== Story ===
A thousand years before the game takes place, a war known as Ragnarok took place. The gods of Asgard were attacked and overrun by demons from Utgard. In desperation, the gods broke an ancient covenant; they sacrificed their lives to create black-winged reapers that came to be known as Grim Angels. Each was armed with a "Diviner", a sacred weapon with which they easily vanquished the demons. After the war ended, Utgard was renamed Riviera and turned into a beautiful paradise. The gods left their knowledge and authority in the stewardship of seven Magi and their power in the care of the Sprites, the inhabitants of a peaceful Riviera.

After a thousand years of peace, rumors of the demons’ return surfaced. Hector, one of the Seven Magi, sends the Grim Angels Ein and Ledah to Riviera, accompanied by Ein's familiar, Rose. They are ordered to activate the "Retribution", a hidden power of the gods which would eliminate the demons but destroy Riviera in the process. At the end of Heaven's Gate, they meet Ursula, the guardian of Riviera. Ein falls in battle and is taken to Yggdrasil, the heart of Riviera, by Ursula. Discovering that he has a good heart, she entrusts him with the protection of Riviera.

Ein wakes up suffering from amnesia and able to recall neither his purpose nor his origin. He is nursed by Fia and Lina, residents of Elendia, which is a village near Yggdrasil. News about the rebirth of the "Accursed" – the "progenitors of evil" – reaches them and they set out to investigate. Eventually, they defeat all four and meet Serene, Cierra and even Rose along the way. Meanwhile, Ledah searches for Yggdrasil, so that he may activate the "Retribution".

Ein now expects to live peacefully in Elendia with his new-found friends, but Ursula informs them that Ledah has breached Yggdrasil and intends to destroy the three "Aquariums", the sources of Yggdrasil's power, in an attempt to activate the Retribution. The six companions (Ein, Lina, Fia, Serene, Cierra and Rose) head out to Yggdrasil. Although they manage to subdue Ledah in battle, it is the Grim Angel Malice, Hector's pawn, who deals the fatal blow. A dying Ledah warns them that Hector has tricked them all this time: he does not fulfill the will of the gods, but seeks ultimate power for himself.

They pursue Malice, but are unable to prevent her from destroying the last Aquarium. They battle her, and eventually Ledah appears to intercept one of Malice's attacks. Ledah dies soon after, telling Ein to stop Hector. The companions then race to the "Maze of Shadows" where Seth, the Sealed One, is imprisoned. There, Hector takes the life of Malice and the girl that Ein has become closest to; the last two souls required to unleash Seth. Hector intends to become the one True God, and to this end he fuses his body with that of Seth to become Seth-Rah. However, Ein and his companions are able to defeat Seth-Rah, and afterwards they are teleported back to Yggdrasil by Ursula just before the entire Maze collapses.

Upon their return, Ursula reveals that, with the death of her counterpart Seth, she too will cease to exist. Before disappearing, she resurrects the girl that Hector killed, and also charges Ein, Fia, Lina, Serene, Cierra and Rose with the continued protection of Riviera.

Since Riviera is a renai, the player can achieve multiple endings depending on his responses to his companions. Depending upon them, an ending may be achieved with Ein and the girl of choice having a special scene together. The ending with Rose is a hidden ending, as it was not in the original WSC game, and Rose doesn't have a trust stat in the game. The last frame also tells (no matter what the ending) that Rose becomes a historian in later life and records their adventures.

== Development ==
All of the CG artwork was redrawn when Riviera was remade from its WonderSwan Color version (top) to its Game Boy Advance counterpart (bottom). The PSP remake reuses the artwork from the GBA version at a higher resolution.

Riviera: The Promised Land was originally developed for the WonderSwan Color. Development started in November 2000, with a Japan-only release in 2002.

In 2004, Riviera was remade for the Game Boy Advance, featuring a completely new art style owed to Sunaho Tobe's involvement in the project, and also had several new CGs, events and limited voice acting. This version saw an eventual translation and North American release courtesy of Atlus USA, in 2005.

In 2006, Sting announced and released a PSP remake of the game, with more CGs, events, and complete voice acting, but the sprites were merely upscaled versions of those used in the WSC and GBA versions. After several retailers leaked the news, Atlus USA officially announced they would be releasing it in North America, along with an extra chapter not appearing in the Japanese version. In October 2007, a Special Edition was released by Sting in Japan, and was essentially the US PSP version with Japanese text replacing English text.

In July 2023, a HD remaster was announced. In early February 2024, it was revealed that the remaster will be available on February 29 in Japan.

== Audio ==
The Game Boy Advance release of Riviera featured a large amount of voice work for a Game Boy Advance title boasting nearly two-hundred voice clips, far more than majority of games for the system.

The PSP release is fully voiced. The Japanese voice actors for the Japanese PSP version are largely the same as the GBA version. Atlus USA chose to keep the Japanese voices in its localization of the game, and also added English voice work. The English voice actors for the game are also largely the same as the GBA version's English voice actors.

The soundtrack for Riviera was composed mostly by Minako Adachi, with a few tracks by Shigeki Hayashi, and spanned less than forty tracks. This music has been rearranged and rerecorded for each release of the game, but has for the most part remained static.

The soundtrack has been released twice, with the first following the GBA version's release, the Riviera Full Arrange Soundtrack, which featured arranged versions of all the songs, but not the original GBA or WSC versions. Soon after came the Riviera Intro Disc which featured the WSC music, as well as a drama track introducing all the characters. In February 2007, following the release of the PSP version of the game, Sting released the Riviera Perfect Audio Collection Plus, a three disc collection containing the original music from all three versions of the game.

Sting has also released several drama tracks for Riviera, the first appearing on the Riviera Intro Disc, followed by four on the Riviera Epilogue Disc, and then a full drama CD following weekly airings on Internet Radio Station Onsen (インターネットラジオステーション＜音泉＞) used to promote the PSP version. This drama CD was called The Precious Chapter and contained seven drama tracks spanning two discs.

== Reception ==
Reception

Aggregate scores
Aggregator	Score	
Aggregator	GBA	PSP
GameRankings	79%	67%
Metacritic	76/100	68/100

Review scores
Publication	Score	
Publication	GBA	PSP
1Up.com	B	B−
Eurogamer	N/A	7/10
Famitsu	32/40	30/40
Game Informer	8.25/10	N/A
GameSpot	8.7/10	7/10
GameSpy	3.5/5	N/A
GameZone	8/10	N/A
IGN	7/10	6.2/10
Nintendo Power	6.5/10	N/A
X-Play	3/5	N/A
411Mania	N/A	7.9/10

The Game Boy Advance version of Riviera: The Promised Land received "generally favorable reviews", while the PSP version received "average" reviews, according to the review aggregation website Metacritic. In Japan, Famitsu gave the WonderSwan Color version a score of 31 out of 40; in 2004 the same magazine gave the GBA version a score of one nine, one eight, one seven, and one eight for a total of 32 out of 40; and in 2006 it gave the PSP version a score of two eights and two sevens for a total of 30 out of 40.
