= Sunaho Tobe =

Japanese illustrator

Sunaho Tobe (戸部 淑, Tobe Sunaho; born November 16, 1972) is a Japanese freelance illustrator and character designer.

She began her career with the video game company Compile. During her time at Compile, she designed the characters for the company's DiskStation games Apple Sauce: Anoko to Natsu Matsuri and Float Land no Otogi Banashi, and illustrated numerous projects for the company.

She later left Compile and became a freelance illustrator, working on numerous projects, including illustrating light novels and designing games for companies such as Sting. In 2005, she provided the character designs to the anime series Zettai Shōnen.

== Works ==
=== Anime ===
- Zettai Shōnen (2005) (original character design)
- Humanity Has Declined (2012) (original character design)

=== Games ===
- Puyo Puyo~n (1999) (character design, key animation, CG)
- Chocolate Kiss (2002) (character design, key illustrations)
- Reveal Fantasia (2002) (character design, illustrations)
- Kyō no Wanko (2003) (character design, illustrations)
- Riviera: The Promised Land (2004) (character design)
- Yggdra Union: We'll Never Fight Alone (2006) (character design)
- Concerto Gate (2007) (character design)
- Summon Night: Twin Age (2007) (character design)
- Knights in the Nightmare (2008) (character design)
- Hexyz Force (2009) (character design)
- Unchained Blades (2011) (character design)
- Mado Monogatari: Fia and the Wondrous Academy (2024) (character design)

=== Novels ===
- Duan Surk II (2002–2011) (illustrations)
- Orusu Banshee (2006–2007) (illustrations)
- Humanity Has Declined (2011–2016) (illustrations)
- I Saved Myself with a Potion!: Life in Another World (2015-present) (illustrations)

=== Other ===
- Dengeki PlayStation (cover, frontispiece illustration, Dengeki yonkoma, cover)
- GA Mini Gashū: "Tobe Sunaho Sakuhinshū" (GAミニ画集「戸部淑作品集」; lit. GA Mini Artbook: Tobe Sunaho Collection)
