= Hexyz Force =

2009 video game

- North American cover art
- Developer: Sting Entertainment
- Publisher: Atlus
- Platform: PlayStation Portable
- Release: JP: November 12, 2009; NA: May 25, 2010
- Genre: Role-playing video game
- Mode: Single-player

Hexyz Force is a role-playing video game developed by Sting Entertainment and published by Atlus for the PlayStation Portable. It was released in Japan on November 12, 2009 and in North America on May 25, 2010.

== Gameplay ==
The player progresses by traveling through Fields, fighting enemies in random encounters along the way. For every battle won the player earns Force Points (FP), which can be used for various purposes including upgrading Ragnafacts (sacred weapons), creating Forcefacts (sacred armor) and restoring the party mid-dungeon. Items and equipment too require FP to create, and cannot be bought in a shop.

Some items can be created by fusing them with the right material items, which are harvested from Harvest Points found within a Field. The Harvest Points will regenerate after the player has fought roughly 3-5 battles, spawning items ranging from common to rare. Hidden treasures and secret events can be unveiled by interacting with non-playable characters, other items can be unlocked by progressing through the story.

Hexyz Force employs a dual protagonist system, which enables the game's world and story to be portrayed through both characters' perspectives.

== Plot ==
Long ago, Norvia, the Goddess of Creation, descended from the heavens. Using the Holy Vessel, a divine chalice charged with all Force (the spiritual energy in the universe), she created life and the Divinities, shepherds of existence. After some time, Delgaia, the God of Destruction, brought about a great calamity known as the Gods' Remorse. He intended to return all Force to the Holy Vessel, returning Berge to the void. The Divinities sacrificed themselves to defeat Delgaia, delivering Berge from doom and sealing the God of Destruction away deep within the earth.

As Berge lay in ruin, a result of its bitter war, Norvia made a covenant. She would restore Berge to its former beauty on one condition. An Hour of Judgment would eventually come to pass, then the world would have to decide its ultimate path: creation or destruction.

The game revolves around two main protagonists: Cecilia, a young cleric from the Holy Temple of Palfina, and Levant, a Member of the elite Cerulean Knight of Rosenbaum Kingdom. Cecilia's mission is to find all the Monoliths scattered all around Berge, while Levant's mission is to find the culprit behind the war between Halbmenschen (half-Humans) and Humans. Both travel their separate ways though they cross paths on their journeys.

== Reception ==
Hexyz Force

Aggregate scores
Aggregator	Score
GameRankings	68.89%
Metacritic	66

Review scores
Publication	Score
GameSpot	7.5/10
GameZone	8/10

Hexyz Force received average reviews. Michael David of GameZone praised the game's sound effects saying that "the thundering magic that looks so good, also sounds pretty good." Some reviewers, however, have criticized the game's lack of challenge saying that the game can be finished within a day or two.
