= List of tactical role-playing video games: 2010 to 2019 =

This is a comprehensive index of commercial tactical role-playing games (Tactical RPGs), sorted chronologically by year. Information regarding release platform, release type, game setting, developers, publishers, and country of origin is provided where available. The table can be sorted by clicking on the small boxes next to the column headings.

== Legend ==
Video game platforms
3DS	Nintendo 3DS, 3DS Virtual Console, iQue 3DS	DROID	Android	DS	Nintendo DS, DSiWare, iQue DS
iOS	iOS, iPhone, iPod, iPadOS, iPad, visionOS, Apple Vision Pro	LIN	Linux	MAC	Classic Mac OS, 2001 and before
NX	(replace with NS)	OSX	macOS	PS2	PlayStation 2
PS3	PlayStation 3	PS4	PlayStation 4	PSP	PlayStation Portable
PSV	PlayStation Vita	Wii	Wii, WiiWare, Wii Virtual Console	WiiU	Wii U, WiiU Virtual Console
WIN	Windows, all versions Windows 95 and up	X360	(replace with XB360)	XOne	(replace with XBO)

Types of releases
Compilation	A compilation, anthology or collection of several titles, usually (but not always) belonging to the same series
Early access	A game launched in early access is unfinished and thus might contain bugs and glitches or have some of the content missing
Episodic	An episodic video game that is released in batches over a period of time
Expansion	A large-scale DLC to an already existing game that adds new story, areas and additions and/or changes to the game's mechanics
Full release	A full release of a game that launched in early access first
Limited	A special release (often called "Limited" or "Collector's Edition") with bonus collector's material. Often provided to people who pre-order a game
Port	The game first appeared on a different platform and a port was made. The game is like the original, with few or no differences
Remake	The game is an enhanced remake of an original, made using a new engine and/or assets and thus containing completely new sound, graphics and possibly changes to the story and/or gameplay
Remaster	The game is a remaster of an original, released on the same or different platform, with (usually minor) changes to graphics, sound and/or gameplay
Rerelease	The game was re-released on the same platform with no or only minor changes

== List ==
Year	Title	Developer	Publisher	Setting	Platform	Release	Series/Notes
2010 (WW)	Vandal Hearts: Flames of Judgment	Hijinx	Konami	Fantasy	PS3, X360	Original	Prequel to Vandal Hearts. Digital release.
2010 (WW)	Valkyria Chronicles II	Sega	Sega	Alternate history	PSP	Original	Second entry in the Valkyria Chronicles series, sequel to Valkyria Chronicles.
2010 (JP)	Moe Moe 2-Ji Daisenryaku 2	SystemSoft	SystemSoft	Alternate history	PS2, PSP	Port	Port of the 2009 PC game. Part of the Moe Moe 2-Ji Daisenryaku series of the Daisenryaku franchise.
2010 (JP)	Moe Moe 2-Ji Daisenryaku 2 * Ultra Deluxe	SystemSoft	SystemSoft	Alternate history	X360	Port	Port of the 2009 PC game. Part of the Moe Moe 2-Ji Daisenryaku series of the Daisenryaku franchise.
2010 (JP)	Moe Moe 2-Ji Daisenryaku 2: Yamato Nadesico	SystemSoft	SystemSoft	Alternate history	DS	Original	Part of the Moe Moe 2-Ji Daisenryaku series of the Daisenryaku franchise.
2010 (EU/AUS)	Disgaea 2: Dark Hero Days	Nippon Ichi Software	NIS America	Fantasy	PSP	Port	Port of Disgaea 2: Cursed Memories, originally released in 2006 for the PS2. This port was released in Japan and North America in 2009.
2010 (WW)	Z.H.P. Unlosing Ranger VS Darkdeath Evilman	Nippon Ichi Software	Nippon Ichi Software	Fantasy	PSP	Original	Combines tactical role-playing with roguelike elements.
2010 (NA/EU)	Sakura Wars: So Long, My Love	Sega, Red Entertainment, Idea Factory (Wii)	NIS America	Science fantasy	PS2, Wii	Original	Fifth entry in the Sakura Wars series, the first one to be released outside Japan. The original PS2 version was released in Japan in 2005, but wasn't localized until 2010. The Wii version wasn't released in Japan. It combines tactical role-playing with visual novel and dating sim.
2010 (JP/NA)	Knights in the Nightmare	Sting	Atlus	Fantasy	PSP	Port	Port of the 2008 DS game (episode IV and third main entry in the Dept. Heaven series). Combines tactical role-playing with strategy and shooter elements.
2010 (JP)	Blaze Union: Story to Reach the Future	Sting	Atlus	Fantasy	PSP	Original	Spin-off of the Dept. Heaven series, prequel to Yggdra Union.
2010 (WW)	The War of Eustrath	iQubi Inc.	iQubi Inc.	Science fantasy	iOS	Original	Port of Battle of the Youstrass, released in 2001 for Windows.
2010 (JP)	Fire Emblem: New Mystery of the Emblem	Intelligent Systems	Nintendo	Fantasy	DS	Remake	Twelfth entry in the Fire Emblem series, remake of the 1994 Fire Emblem: Mystery of the Emblem. First game in the series not released outside Japan since Fire Emblem: The Binding Blade.
2010 (NA); 2012 (EU/WW)	Blazing Souls: Accelate	Idea Factory	Aksys Games (PSP NA), Rising Star Games (PSP EU), HyperDevbox Japan (DROID, iOS)	Fantasy	PSP, DROID, iOS	Port	Port of Blazing Souls, originally released in 2006 for the PS2 only in Japan, and later ported to Xbox 360 in 2007. The PSP port was previously released in Japan in 2009. Part of the Neverland universe.
2010 (JP); 2011 (NA/EU)	Phantom Brave: The Hermuda Triangle	Nippon Ichi Software	Nippon Ichi Software	Fantasy	PSP	Port	Port of Phantom Brave, originally released in 2004 for the PS2. The European version was only released digitally for the PlayStation Network.
2010 (JP); 2011 (NA/EU)	Tactics Ogre: Let Us Cling Together	Square Enix	Square Enix	Fantasy	PSP	Remake	Remake of the 1995 SNES game of the same name.
2010 (JP)	Tears to Tiara: Garland of the Earth Portable	Aquaplus	Aquaplus	Fantasy	PSP	Port	Port of Tears to Tiara: Garland of the Earth, which is a PS3 remake of Tears to Tiara released in 2008.
2010 (JP)	Tears to Tiara Anecdotes: The Secret of Avalon	Aquaplus	Aquaplus	Fantasy	PSP	Port	Port of the PS3 game released in 2009.
2011 (WW)	Hunters: Episode One	Rodeo Games	Rodeo Games	Sci-fi	iOS, DROID	Original	First game in the Hunters series.
2011 (WW)	Spectral Souls: Resurrection of the Ethereal Empires	Idea Factory	HyperDevbox Japan	Fantasy	DROID, iOS, WIN	Port	Port of the 2005 PSP game. Part of the Neverland universe.
2011 (WW)	Shining Force	Sega	Sega	Fantasy	WIN	Port	Port to Steam of the first Shining Force, originally released for the Mega Drive in 1992.
2011 (WW)	Shining Force II	Sega	Sega	Fantasy	WIN	Port	Port to Steam of Shining Force II, originally released for the Mega Drive in 1993.
2011 (JP)	Valkyria Chronicles 3: Unrecorded Chronicles	Sega, Media.Vision	Sega	Alternate history	PSP	Original	Third entry in the Valkyria Chronicles series, only released in Japan.
2011 (WW)	Disgaea 4: A Promise Unforgotten	Nippon Ichi Software	Nippon Ichi Software	Fantasy	PS3	Original	Fourth entry in the Disgaea series.
2011 (JP); 2012 (NA); 2013 (EU)	Gungnir	Sting	Atlus	Fantasy	PSP	Original	Episode IX and fourth main entry in the Dept. Heaven series.
2011 (JP)	Gloria Union	Sting	Atlus	Fantasy	PSP	Original	Spin-off of the Dept. Heaven series, only released in Japan.
2011 (JP); 2012 (NA); 2013 (EU)	Shin Megami Tensei: Devil Survivor 2	Career Soft	Atlus	Post-apocalyptic	DS	Original	Second entry in the Devil Survivor sub-series of the Megami Tensei franchise.
2011 (WW)	Final Fantasy Tactics: The War of the Lions	Square Enix, Hi Corporation	Square Enix	Fantasy	iOS	Port	Port of the 2007 PSP port of Final Fantasy Tactics.
2011 (JP/NA); 2013 (EU)	Shin Megami Tensei: Devil Survivor Overclocked	Career Soft	Atlus	Post-apocalyptic	3DS	Port	Port of the 2009 DS game Shin Megami Tensei: Devil Survivor.
2011 (WW)	Squids	The Game Bakers	The Game Bakers	Aquatic	iOS, DROID, WIN, MAC	Original	-
2011 (JP); 2012 (NA)	Ragnarok Tactics	GungHo Online Entertainment	GungHo Online Entertainment	Fantasy	PSP	Original	Spin-off of Ragnarok Online.
2011 (WW)	Generation of Chaos	Idea Factory	HyperDevbox Japan	Fantasy	DROID	Port	Port of the 2005 PSP game. Part of the Neverland universe.
2011 (JP); 2012 (NA/EU/AUS)	Disgaea 3: Absence of Detention	Nippon Ichi Software	Nippon Ichi Software	Fantasy	PSV	Port	Port of Disgaea 3: Absence of Justice.
2011 (JP)	Super Robot Wars Alpha	Banpresto	Banpresto	Sci-fi (mecha)	PS3, PSP, PSV	Port	Port for the PlayStation Network. Like the original, it was only released in Japan.
2012 (WW)	Call of Cthulhu: The Wasted Land	Red Wasp Design	Red Wasp Design	Lovecraftian horror	iOS, WIN, DROID	Original	Based on the works of H. P. Lovecraft.
2012 (JP)	Shining Blade	Media.Vision	Sega	Fantasy	PSP	Original	Part of the Shining franchise, only released in Japan.
2012 (WW)	Hunters 2	Rodeo Games	Rodeo Games	Sci-fi	iOS	Original	Second game in the Hunters series.
2012 (WW)	Pokémon Conquest	Tecmo Koei	Nintendo	Crossover	DS	Original	Crossover title between Pokémon and Nobunaga's Ambition.
2012 (JP); 2013 (NA/EU/AUS)	Fire Emblem Awakening	Intelligent Systems, Nintendo SPD	Nintendo	Fantasy	3DS	Original	Thirteenth entry in the Fire Emblem series.
2012 (JP); 2013 (NA/EU)	Generation of Chaos: Pandora's Reflection	Sting, Idea Factory	Idea Factory	Fantasy	PSP	Original	Part of the Generation of Chaos series. Known in Japan as Generation of Chaos 6.
2012 (JP)	Tales of the World: Tactics Union	Bandai Namco, Jupiter	Bandai Namco	Fantasy	DROID, iOS	Original	Spin-off of the Tales series, part of the Tales of the World sub-series, featuring characters from other main Tales games. Only released in Japan.
2012 (WW)	XCOM: Enemy Unknown	Firaxis Games	2K Games	Sci-fi	WIN, PS3, X360, OSX, iOS, DROID, LIN	Remake	Remake of X-COM: UFO Defense.
2012 (JP); 2013 (NA/EU/AUS)	Project X Zone	Monolith Soft, Banpresto	Bandai Namco Games	Crossover	3DS	Original	Crossover title with characters from Bandai Namco, Sega and Capcom franchises.
2012 (JP)	2nd Super Robot Wars Original Generation	Tose, B.B. Studio	Bandai Namco	Sci-fi (mecha)	PS3	Original	Part of the Super Robot Wars franchise and sequel to Super Robot Wars Original Generation Gaiden.
2013 (JP); 2015 (WW)	Final Fantasy Tactics: The War of the Lions	Square Enix, Hi Corporation	Square Enix	Fantasy	DROID	Port	Port of the 2007 PSP port of Final Fantasy Tactics. Initially released only in Japan through the Square Enix Market, it became available worldwide on Google Play in 2015.
2013 (WW)	Banner Saga, The: Factions	Stoic Studio	Versus Evil	Fantasy	WIN, OSX	Original	Multiplayer standalone game of The Banner Saga.
2013 (JP)	Super Robot Wars UX	Banpresto	Bandai Namco	Sci-fi (mecha)	3DS	Original	Part of the Super Robot Wars franchise.
2013 (WW)	Disgaea D2: A Brighter Darkness	Nippon Ichi Software	Nippon Ichi Software	Fantasy	PS3	Original	Sequel of Disgaea: Hour of Darkness.
2013 (JP); 2015 (NA)	Summon Night 5	Felistella	Bandai Namco (JP), Gaijinworks (NA)	Fantasy	PSP	Original	Fifth main entry in the Summon Night series, and the first one released outside Japan.
2013 (WW)	Expeditions: Conquistador	Logic Artists	BitComposer	Historical	LIN, WIN, OSX	Original	Set in the 16th century.
2013 (WW)	Shadowrun Returns	Harebrained Schemes	Harebrained Schemes	Science fantasy	DROID, iOS, LIN, OSX, WIN	Original	Part of the Shadowrun series.
2013 (JP)	Shining Force Gaiden	Camelot Software Planning	Sega	Fantasy	3DS	Port	Port of Shining Force Gaiden for the Nintendo 3DS Virtual Console. Like the original, it was only released in Japan.
2013 (JP); 2014 (NA/EU)	Tears to Tiara II: Heir of the Overlord	Aquaplus	Aquaplus (JP), Atlus (NA), NIS America (EU)	Fantasy	PS3	Original	Sequel to Tears to Tiara.
2013 (WW)	Shining Force: The Sword of Hajya	Camelot Software Planning	Sega	Fantasy	3DS	Port	Port of Shining Force: The Sword of Hajya for the Nintendo 3DS Virtual Console.
2013 (WW)	Warhammer Quest	Rodeo Games	Rodeo Games	Fantasy	iOS, WIN, LIN, MAC, DROID, PS4, XONE, NX	Original	Part of Warhammer Fantasy franchise. Digital version of Warhammer Quest board game.
2013 (WW)	XCOM: Enemy Within	Firaxis Games	2K Games	Sci-fi	WIN, PS3, X360, OSX, iOS, DROID, LIN	Expansion	Expansion pack for XCOM: Enemy Unknown.
2014 (WW)	Banner Saga, The	Stoic Studio	Versus Evil	Fantasy	WIN, OSX, iOS, LIN, DROID	Original	Viking-themed indie tactical squad-based RPG. First entry in a series.
2014 (JP)	Shining Force Gaiden: Final Conflict	Camelot Software Planning	Sega	Fantasy	3DS	Port	Port of Shining Force Gaiden: Final Conflict for the Nintendo 3DS Virtual Console. Like the original, it was only released in Japan.
2014 (WW)	Blackguards	Daedalic Entertainment	Daedalic Entertainment	Fantasy	WIN, OSX	Original	Based on the pen and paper RPG The Dark Eye.
2014 (JP)	Super Heroine Chronicle	Banpresto	Bandai Namco	Crossover	PSV, PS3	Original	Crossover title with heroines from different anime series. Only released in Japan.
2014 (WW)	Disgaea 4: A Promise Revisited	Nippon Ichi Software	Nippon Ichi Software	Fantasy	PSV	Port	Port of Disgaea 4: A Promise Unforgotten.
2014 (WW)	Shadowrun: Dragonfall	Harebrained Schemes	Harebrained Schemes	Science fantasy	DROID, iOS, LIN, OSX, WIN	Expansion	Expansion to Shadowrun Returns.
2014 (WW)	Natural Doctrine	Kadokawa Games	Kadokawa Games (JP), Nippon Ichi Software (NA, EU)	Fantasy	PS3, PS4, PSV	Original	-
2014 (JP); 2015 (NA/EU/AUS)	Hyperdevotion Noire: Goddess Black Heart	Compile Heart, Sting	Compile Heart (JP), Idea Factory (WW)	Science fantasy	PSV	Original	Spin-off of the Hyperdimension Neptunia series.
2014 (JP); 2015 (NA/EU)	Lost Dimension	Lancarse	FuRyu (JP), Atlus USA (NA), NIS America (EU)	Science fantasy	PS3, PSV	Original	With some visual novel elements.
2014 (WW)	Shadowrun: Dragonfall - Director's Cut	Harebrained Schemes	Harebrained Schemes	Science fantasy	DROID, iOS, LIN, OSX, WIN	Rerel	Standalone director's cut version of Shadowrun Returns' expansion.
2014 (JP)	Tales of the World: Reve Unitia	Bandai Namco	Bandai Namco	Fantasy	3DS	Original	Based on Tales of the World: Tactics Union, it expands its gameplay and story. Only released in Japan.
2014 (JP)	Super Hero Generation	Bandai Namco	Bandai Namco	Crossover	PS3, PSV	Original	Crossover title with characters from the Japanese TV series Ultraman, Kamen Rider and Gundam. Only released in Japan.
2014 (NA)	The Legend of Korra: A New Era Begins	Webfoot Technologies	Activision	Fantasy	3DS	Original	Based on the TV series The Legend of Korra.
2014 (WW)	Valkyria Chronicles	Sega	Sega	Alternate history	WIN	Port	Port to Steam of the 2008 PS3 title Valkyria Chronicles. Includes all DLC from the original.
2014 (JP)	Tactics Ogre: Let Us Cling Together	Quest	Square Enix	Fantasy	WiiU	Port	Port of the original SNES Tactics Ogre for the Virtual Console of the WiiU. Only released in Japan.
2015 (WW)	Blackguards 2	Daedalic Entertainment	Daedalic Entertainment	Fantasy	WIN, OSX	Original	Sequel to Blackguards.
2015 (WW)	Shin Megami Tensei: Devil Survivor 2 Record Breaker	Atlus	Atlus, NIS America (EU)	Post-apocalyptic	3DS	Port	Port of Shin Megami Tensei: Devil Survivor 2, originally released in 2011 for Nintendo DS.
2015 (WW)	Code Name: S.T.E.A.M.	Intelligent Systems, Nintendo SPD	Nintendo	Sci-fi	3DS	Original	-
2015 (WW)	Disgaea 5: Alliance of Vengeance	Nippon Ichi Software	Nippon Ichi Software	Fantasy	PS4	Original	Fifth entry in the Disgaea series.
2015 (WW)	Chroma Squad	Behold Studios	Behold Studios	Sci-fi	WIN, OSX, LIN	Original	Inspired by the Power Rangers franchise.
2015 (JP/NA); 2016 (EU/AUS)	Stella Glow	Imageepoch	Sega (JP), Atlus (NA), NIS America (EU, AUS)	Fantasy	3DS	Original	-
2015 (JP); 2016 (NA/EU/AUS)	Fire Emblem Fates: Birthright	Intelligent Systems, Nintendo SPD	Nintendo	Fantasy	3DS	Original	Fourteenth entry in the Fire Emblem series, released in three different versions with different storyline each one. Birthright and Conquest were released in physical format, while Revelation was only available as downloadable content. An edition containing the three stories and an art book, called Fire Emblem Fates: Special Edition was also released.
2015 (JP); 2016 (NA/EU/AUS)	Fire Emblem Fates: Conquest	Intelligent Systems, Nintendo SPD	Nintendo	Fantasy	3DS	Original	Fourteenth entry in the Fire Emblem series, released in three different versions with different storyline each one. Birthright and Conquest were released in physical format, while Revelation was only available as downloadable content. An edition containing the three stories and an art book, called Fire Emblem Fates: Special Edition was also released.
2015 (JP); 2016 (NA/EU/AUS)	Fire Emblem Fates: Revelation	Intelligent Systems, Nintendo SPD	Nintendo	Fantasy	3DS	Original	Fourteenth entry in the Fire Emblem series, released in three different versions with different storyline each one. Birthright and Conquest were released in physical format, while Revelation was only available as downloadable content. An edition containing the three stories and an art book, called Fire Emblem Fates: Special Edition was also released.
2015 (JP); 2016 (NA/EU)	Langrisser Re:Incarnation Tensei	Masaya Games	Masaya Games (JP), Aksys Games (NA)	Science fantasy	3DS	Original	Part of the Langrisser series. First game in the series since 1998.
2015 (JP)	Luminous Arc Infinity	Felistella	Marvelous Entertainment	Fantasy	PSV	Original	Fourth entry in the Luminous Arc series and the only one not developed by Imageepoch.
2015 (WW)	Shadowrun: Hong Kong	Harebrained Schemes	Harebrained Schemes	Science fantasy	WIN, OSX, LIN	Original	Part of the Shadowrun series.
2015 (WW)	Heroes Tactics: Mythiventures	Camex Games	Camex Games	Fantasy	DROID, iOS, WIN	Original	-
2015 (WW)	Chaos Reborn	Snapshot Games	Snapshot Games	Fantasy	WIN, LIN, OSX	Remake	Remake of Chaos: The Battle of Wizards. Features single player and multiplayer modes.
2015 (WW)	Voidspire Tactics	Rad Codex	Rad Codex	Fantasy	WIN	Original	-
2015 (JP); 2016 (NA/EU/AUS)	Project X Zone 2	Monolith Soft	Bandai Namco	Crossover	3DS	Original	Crossover title with characters from Bandai Namco, Sega, Capcom and Nintendo franchises.
2015 (JP); 2016 (NA/EU)	Grand Kingdom	Monochrome Corporation	Spike Chunsoft (JP), NIS America (NA)	Fantasy	PS4, PSV	Original	-
2015 (WW)	Mordheim: City of the Damned	Rogue Factor	Focus Home Interactive	Fantasy	WIN	Original	Based on the 1999 tabletop game Mordheim. Two DLC were released later for the game, featuring a new faction each one.
2016 (WW)	Banner Saga, The	Stoic Studio	Versus Evil	Fantasy	PS4, XONE	Port	Port of The Banner Saga.
2016 (WW)	Valkyria Chronicles Remastered	Sega, Media.Vision	Sega	Alternate history	PS4	Port	Port to Steam of the 2008 PS3 title Valkyria Chronicles. Includes all DLC from the original and dual audio.
2016 (WW)	Disgaea PC	Nippon Ichi Software	NIS America	Fantasy	WIN	Port	Port of Disgaea: Hour of Darkness. Contains the additional content found in the PSP and DS versions of the game.
2016 (JP); 2017 (NA/EU)	Summon Night 6: Lost Borders	Media.Vision, Felistella	Bandai Namco (JP), Gaijinworks (NA, EU)	Fantasy	PS4, PSV	Original	Sixth main entry in the Summon Night series. Incorporates elements of visual novels.
2016 (WW)	XCOM: Enemy Unknown Plus	Firaxis Games	2K Games	Sci-fi	PSV	Comp	Compilation port of XCOM: Enemy Unknown and its expansion, XCOM: Enemy Within.
2016 (WW)	Banner Saga 2, The	Stoic Studio	Versus Evil	Fantasy	WIN, OSX, XONE, PS4, iOS, DROID	Original	Second entry in The Banner Saga series and sequel to The Banner Saga.
2016 (WW)	Hyperdevotion Noire: Goddess Black Heart	Compile Heart, Sting	Idea Factory	Science fantasy	WIN	Port	Port of the 2014 PSV game.
2016 (WW)	Phantom Brave PC	Nippon Ichi Software	NIS America	Fantasy	WIN	Port	Port of Phantom Brave that includes the content of the Wii and PSP versions.
2016 (WW)	Tahira: Echoes of the Astral Empire	Whale Hammer Games	Whale Hammer Games	Science fantasy	WIN, OSX, LIN	Original	-
2016 (JP); 2019 (WW)	Vestaria Saga I: War of the Scions	Vestaria Project	DANGEN Entertainment	Fantasy	WIN	Original	Originally a freeware indie game, it got a commercial English version on Steam. Created by Shouzou Kaga, creator of Fire Emblem, using the SRPG Studio software.
2016 (JP/NA); 2017 (EU)	Mercenaries Saga 3: Gray Wolves of War	Rideon	Circle Entertainment	Fantasy	3DS	Original	Third entry in the Mercenaries Saga series. Digital release only.
2016 (WW)	Mordheim: City of the Damned	Rogue Factor	Focus Home Interactive	Fantasy	PS4, XONE	Port	Port of the 2015 game.
2016 (JP)	Tactics Ogre: Let Us Cling Together	Quest	Square Enix	Fantasy	3DS	Port	Port of the original SNES Tactics Ogre for the Virtual Console of the New Nintendo 3DS. Only released in Japan.
2017 (WW)	Disgaea 2 PC	Nippon Ichi Software	NIS America	Fantasy	WIN, LIN, OSX	Port	Port of Disgaea 2 with the content of the PSP port included.
2017 (WW)	Fire Emblem Heroes	Intelligent Systems, Nintendo EPD	Nintendo	Fantasy	DROID, iOS	Original	Spin-off of the Fire Emblem series featuring simplified mechanics and characters from the entire franchise.
2017 (WW)	Battle Brothers	Overhype Studios	Overhype Studios	Fantasy	WIN	Original	Indie squad-focused turn-based tactics game set in a medieval fantasy world.
2017 (WW)	Disgaea 5 Complete	Nippon Ichi Software	Nippon Ichi Software	Fantasy	NX	Port	Port of Disgaea 5 with all the DLC included.
2017 (WW)	Fire Emblem Echoes: Shadows of Valentia	Intelligent Systems	Nintendo	Fantasy	3DS	Original	Fifteenth entry in the Fire Emblem series and remake of the 1992 NES title Fire Emblem Gaiden.
2017 (WW)	Expeditions: Viking	Logic Artists	Logic Artists	Historical	WIN	Original	Set circa 790 AD in England. From the makers of Expeditions: Conquistador.
2017 (WW)	Chroma Squad	Behold Studios	Bandai Namco	Sci-fi	iOS, DROID, PS4, XONE	Port	Port of the 2015 game.
2017 (WW)	Heroes Tactics	Camex Games	Camex Games	Fantasy	WIN	Port	Port of Heroes Tactics: Mythiventures released on Steam.
2017 (WW)	Alvora Tactics	Rad Codex	Rad Codex	Fantasy	WIN	Original	-
2017 (WW)	God Wars: Future Past	Kadokawa Games	Kadokawa Games (JP), NIS America (WW)	Fantasy	PS4, PSV	Original	-
2017 (EU/NA); 2018 (JP)	Mario + Rabbids Kingdom Battle	Ubisoft	Ubisoft	Crossover	NX	Original	Crossover title with characters from the Mario and Raving Rabbids franchises. Features single player and cooperative modes.
2017 (WW)	Blackguards 2	Daedalic Entertainment	Daedalic Entertainment	Fantasy	PS4, XONE	Port	Port of the 2015 game.
2017 (WW)	Lost Dimension	Lancarse	Ghostlight	Science fantasy	WIN	Port	Port of the 2014 game.
2017 (WW)	Warhammer Quest 2: The End Times	Perchang Games	Perchang Games	Fantasy	iOS, DROID, WIN, MAC, PS4, XONE, NX	Original	Part of Warhammer Fantasy franchise. Digital version of Warhammer Quest board game.
2018 (WW)	Mercenaries Saga Chronicles	Rideon	Circle Entertainment	Fantasy	NX	Comp	Collection of the three Mercenaries Saga games.
2018 (WW)	Valkyria Chronicles 4	Sega, Media.Vision	Sega	Alternate history	PS4, NX, XONE, WIN	Original	Fourth entry in the Valkyria Chronicles series.
2018 (WW)	Banner Saga, The	Stoic Studio	Versus Evil	Fantasy	NX	Port	Port of The Banner Saga.
2018 (WW)	Banner Saga 2, The	Stoic Studio	Versus Evil	Fantasy	NX	Port	Port of The Banner Saga 2.
2018 (WW)	Banner Saga 3, The	Stoic Studio	Versus Evil	Fantasy	WIN, OSX, PS4, XONE, NX	Original	Third entry in The Banner Saga series and sequel to The Banner Saga 2.
2018 (WW)	Disgaea 1 Complete	Nippon Ichi Software	Nippon Ichi Software	Fantasy	PS4, NX	Remake	Remake of Disgaea: Hour of Darkness.
2018 (WW)	God Wars: The Complete Legend	Kadokawa Games	NIS America	Fantasy	NX	Port	Port of God Wars: Future Past, originally released for PS4 and PSV in 2017. Includes additional content as well as the DLC from the original game.
2018 (WW)	Chaos Reborn: Adventures	Snapshot Games	Big Blue Bubble	Fantasy	DROID, iOS	Port	Port of the 2015 game.
2018 (WW)	Valkyria Chronicles Remastered	Sega, Media.Vision	Sega	Alternate history	NX	Port	Port of the Valkyria Chronicles Remastered port, previously launched for PS4 in 2016. Digital release only.
2018 (WW)	Mercenaries Wings: The False Phoenix	Rideon	Circle Entertainment, PM Studios (physical)	Fantasy	PS4, NX	Original	Part of the Mercenaries (Mercenaries Saga) series. The English PS4 version was released in 2019.
2018 (WW)	Disgaea 5 Complete	Nippon Ichi Software	Nippon Ichi Software	Fantasy	WIN	Port	Port of Disgaea 5 with all the DLC included.
2018 (WW)	Mutant Year Zero: Road to Eden	The Bearded Ladies	Funcom	Post-apocalyptic	WIN, PS4, XONE	Original	Based on the tabletop RPG Mutant Year Zero.
2018 (WW)	Star Traders: Frontiers	Trese Brothers	Trese Brothers	Space opera	WIN, iOS, DROID	Original	Hybrid space trading and RPG
2019 (Asia)	Super Robot Wars T	B.B. Studio	Bandai Namco	Sci-fi (mecha)	PS4, NX	Original	Part of the Super Robot Wars franchise. Only released in Asia.
2019 (WW)	Druidstone	Ctrl Alt Ninja	Ctrl Alt Ninja	Fantasy	WIN	Original	-
2019 (JP); 2020 (WW)	Langrisser I&II	Kadokawa Games	Kadokawa Games	Fantasy	PS4, NX	Remake	Remake of Langrisser and Langrisser II.
2019 (WW)	Fell Seal: Arbiter's Mark	6 Eyes Studio	1C Entertainment	Fantasy	PS4, NX, XONE, WIN, OSX, LIN	Original	-
2019 (WW)	God Wars: The Complete Legend	Kadokawa Games	NIS America	Fantasy	WIN	Port	Port of God Wars: Future Past, originally released for PS4 and PSV in 2017. Includes additional content as well as the DLC from the original game.
2019 (WW)	Fire Emblem: Three Houses	Intelligent Systems, Koei Tecmo	Nintendo	Fantasy	NX	Original	Sixteenth entry in the Fire Emblem series.
2019 (JP); 2020 (WW)	War of the Visions: Final Fantasy Brave Exvius	Square Enix, Gumi Inc.	Square Enix	Fantasy	DROID, iOS	Original	Spin-off of Final Fantasy Brave Exvius, which is a spin-off of the Final Fantasy series.
