= Viractal: Will You Trust Your Party? =

- Developer: Sting
- Publisher: Sting
- Platforms: Windows; Nintendo Switch; Nintendo Switch 2
- Release: January 26, 2026; Switch, Switch 2; October 1, 2026
- Genres: Digital tabletop, role-playing
- Modes: Single-player, multiplayer

Viractal: Will You Trust Your Party? (Note: Japanese: ヴィラクタル) is a board game-style role-playing video game developed and published by Sting. It was first released in early access on Windows in September 2025, and a full version was released on January 26, 2026.

It released on Nintendo Switch and Nintendo Switch 2 on October 1, 2026.

== Gameplay ==
Viractal is a role-playing video game where players control heroes journeying through the miniature world of Viractalia. It features hex grid maps with enemies and events, which are procedurally generated in every playthrough. The maps are explored like a board game; players roll dice to determine their movement, with unneeded movement points able to be saved up for future use in events and combat. The game supports online multiplayer. Playable characters include crossover characters from Baroque and Yggdra Union.

The combat is composed of deck-building game elements, with players collecting cards and creating unique deck and combinations to survive battles. During events, players can make decisions that may lead to gaining powerful abilities or changing the course of the adventure.

== Development and release ==
Viractal was developed by Sting, the developer of the Dokapon series. The game was announced in April 2025. A demo was first released on 12 May. The game was released as an early access title via Steam on 19 September 2025, subtitled World of Viractalia. During this time, Sting released updates on monthly basis, adding new stages, new playable characters, unlockable items, and other expanded content.

The game was fully released on 26 January 2026, adding a new stage called "Memories of the Journey", which combines all previously introduced stages into a single adventure. Ports to Nintendo Switch and Nintendo Switch 2 will be released on 30 September 2026.
