= Perchang =

2016 video game

- App icon
- Developer: Perchang
- Publisher: Perchang
- Platforms: iOS, Android, Nintendo Switch
- Release: iOS; 23 June 2016; Android; 4 August 2016; Switch; 4 June 2019
- Genre: Puzzle
- Mode: Single-player

Perchang is a 2016 puzzle video game developed and published by Perchang. In the game, the player has to guide balls into a funnel. Perchang was released for iOS in June 2016, Android in August 2016, and Nintendo Switch in June 2019. It was met with a mostly positive reception.

A sequel, Perchang World, was released on May 7, 2026 exclusively on the Apple Arcade service. It features narration from English comedian James Acaster.

== Gameplay ==
In Perchang, the player is tasked with getting a certain number of balls from a designated starting point to go into a funnel located somewhere else in the environment to complete a level. The player must get the required number of balls into the funnel in a certain time limit to complete the level. In most levels, the path between the start and end points is like Rube Goldberg machine with elements (environmental objects) such as magnets and flippers that need to be properly operated to get the balls to the funnel. The environmental objects are colored red or blue. Tapping the red button activates the objects colored red and tapping the blue button activates the objects colored blue. The player can change the color of the environmental objects which is done by tapping on the object (if the object was red it will become blue and vice versa).

As the player progresses through the levels new elements are introduced such as magnets, flippers, fans, portals and more. The game has 60 levels, with 50 being regular levels (arranged in 10 areas) and 10 being bonus levels unlocked by getting a gold metal (done by completing the level in a certain amount of time or less) on all levels in an area.

== Development and release ==
Perchang was developed by the indie studio Perchang Games. Creator Ben Murch, formerly of Rodeo Games, was involved in the production of two of the company's games: Warhammer 40,000: Deathwatch and Hunters. Perchang was released for iOS on 23 June 2016, with a port for Android released on 4 August 2016. On 27 October 2016, downloadable content titled Perchang Black was released, adding 24 zero-gravity levels. A subsequent version of the game for Nintendo Switch was released on 4 June 2019.

== Reception ==
Reception

Aggregate score
Aggregator	Score
Metacritic	78/100

On Metacritic, Perchang received a "generally favorable" rating of 78 based on five critics. Multiple reviewers praised the game.

The game also reached the Top Charts for paid apps in the US and UK App Stores, ranking third on July 5, 2016.
