= TKO Boxing =

TKO Boxing can refer to:

- TKO Super Championship Boxing, a 1992 video game
- Total Knockout Boxing (also known as Total Knockout: Championship Female Boxing!), a 1996 video game
