= Flying Hero =

1992 video game

Flying Hero: Bugyuru no Daibōken
- Developer: Sting Entertainment
- Publisher: SOFEL
- Platform: Super Famicom
- Release: JP: December 18, 1992
- Genre: Scrolling shooter
- Mode: Single-player

Flying Hero: Bugyuru no Daibouken (Note: Japanese: フライングヒーロー ぶぎゅる〜の大冒険, Hepburn: Furaingu Hīrō: Bugyurū no Daibōken; lit. 'Flying Hero: Bugyuru's Great Adventure') is a vertically scrolling shooter developed by Sting Entertainment and published by SOFEL. It was released in Japan on December 18, 1992 for the Super Famicom. The game was not released in other countries.

== Gameplay and premise ==
Flying Hero is a vertical-scrolling shooting game. The player controls a small ball creature with wings and wears tennis shoes named Bugle. The game takes place in the Fantasy Land. The demon king and his witch have teamed up to kidnap the hero's girlfriend. The screen scrolls automatically, but you can adjust the speed to three levels. The game features scaling and rotational effects of sprites. Mode 7 effects are often used on bosses.

Icons can be found throughout stages which arm the player with weapons including snowballs and lightning bolts.

Enemies in the game include flying monkeys, pirate cows, and specters. End and mid-stage bosses include a spinning man made of rock, a jack in the box clown, and a crow pirate leader. One end stage boss is a giant fireball that rises out of water.

The game allows only three continues.

== Reception ==
Reception

Review scores
Publication	Score
GamesMaster	68%
Joypad	81%
Official Nintendo Magazine	64%
Super Play	68%
Game Power	82%
Hippon Super!	7/10
The Super Famicom	64/100
Super Power	81/100
Super Pro	65/100

Flying Hero received average reviews. Electronic Gaming Monthly's Terri Aki described it as a very original title. GameFan praised the game, commenting that its intermediate difficulty was perfect for children, allowing them to enjoy a fun game without excessive violence. Super Play's Jason Brookes wrote that it was an "average shoot-'emup with sturdy gameplay and a sense of humour, but hardly a must-buy".

GamePro's Kamikaze remarked that the game was quite difficult despite appearances. GamesMaster's Les Ellis said that the game was "a vertical blast of fun" but hard to take seriously due to the setting and characters. Super Pro's Dave Westley commended the game's imaginative visuals, but criticized its dull backgrounds and considered the soundscapes and gameplay to be average.
