= Dokapon! Sword of Fury =

Tabletop roleplaying board game

Dokapon! Ikari no Tekken
- Developer(s): Asmik Ace Entertainment
- Publisher(s): Asmik Ace Entertainment (Note: Remaster developed and published by Sting Entertainment.)
- Series: Dokapon
- Platform(s): PlayStation; Nintendo Switch; Windows
- Release: PlayStation: JP: November 5, 1998; Nintendo Switch: JP: August 1, 2024; Windows: WW: January 21, 2025
- Genre(s): Role-playing
- Mode(s): Single-player, multiplayer

Dokapon! Ikari no Tekken (Note: Japanese: ドカポン！怒りの鉄剣 (Dokapon! Ikari no Tekken)) (Note: The original Japanese title is often misspelled as "Tesuken" instead of "Tekken".) is a video game based on sugoroku-board games together with role playing elements, released in 1998 for the PlayStation only in Japan. It is the third game in the Dokapon series, after Dokapon 3-2-1, made by Asmik Ace Entertainment.

Up to 3 or 4 players can play. Dokapon gameplay features not only beating the enemies but also the other players.

A remastered version of the game was released in Japan for Nintendo Switch on August 1, 2024, as well as the Windows version having released worldwide on January 21, 2025, under the title Dokapon! Sword of Fury, developed and published by Sting Entertainment.

== Gameplay ==
Dokapon! Ikari no Tekken is styled like a board game, it uses compass rotation and players move by the number shown. There are various events on spaces. Followed by 1), Before their roll, players can use their items, or magic. 2). Players rotate the compass, stop at any number and walk by that number. In each round, players can use their items or magic before moving that can inflict damage or status ailments. When a player stops on a normal space either a monster will appear or an event (indicated by an !) will trigger. Players that land on the same space will fight each other. Players then must choose two cards when the fight begins. If the card is red (先攻) the players is an attacker, if the card is blue (後攻) that player is a defender. After that, players choose their battle skills to fight.

== Plot ==
Dokapon! Ikari no Tekken takes place in a fantastical world, where a false king rules over the land. Upon his guise being discovered, he transforms into his true form, Wallace. Players are then instructed by the true king to defeat all manifestations of Wallace in the game.

== Release ==
A remastered version of the game was released for the Nintendo Switch in Japan on August 1, 2024.
