= Dokapon =

Video game series

- Title screen from Dokapon: Monster Hunter, the first game localized for the US
- Genre: Role-playing
- Developers: Asmik Ace Entertainment (1993-2004); Earthly Soft (1995); Sting Entertainment (2007-present); Suzak Inc. (2008)
- Publishers: JP: Asmik Ace Entertainment (1993-2004); JP: Sting Entertainment (2007-2009); Other publishers: AIA (2001); Ubi Soft (2001); Examu (2007); Atlus (2007-2009); BigBen Interactive (2007); Aquaplus (2020); Compile Heart (2023-present); Idea Factory (2023-present)
- Platforms: Android; Game Boy Advance; Game Boy Color; GameCube; iOS; Nintendo DS; Nintendo Switch; PlayStation; PlayStation 2; PlayStation 4; Super Nintendo Entertainment System; Wii; Windows
- First release: Kessen! Dokapon Oukoku IV: Densetsu no Yuusha Tachi; December 10, 1993
- Latest release: Dokapon! Sword of Fury; August 1, 2024

Dokapon is a role-playing video game franchise created by Asmik Ace Entertainment and currently developed by Sting Entertainment. The Dokapon franchise is primarily composed of multiplayer games with role-playing video game and board game elements. Since its debut in 1993, the series has sold more than one million copies.

== Games ==
The first entry in the series, Kessen! Dokapon Oukoku IV: Densetsu no Yuusha Tachi, was developed and published by Asmik Ace Entertainment for the Super Famicom in 1993. A remake, Dokapon Journey, was developed by Suzak Inc. for Nintendo DS in 2008.

A sequel, Dokapon 3・2・1 – Arashi o Yobu Yuujou, was developed and published by Asmik Ace Entertainment for the Super Famicom in 1994. A remake, Dokapon Kingdom, was developed by Sting Entertainment for the PlayStation 2 in 2007, and for Wii in 2008.

A spin-off, Dokapon Gaiden: Honoo no Audition, was developed by Earthly Soft and published by Asmik Ace Entertainment for the Super Famicom and Satellaview in 1995.

The third main game, Dokapon Ikari no Tekken, was developed and published by Asmik Ace Entertainment for the PlayStation in 1998.

An action role-playing spin-off, Dokapon?! Millennium Quest, was developed and published by Asmik Ace Entertainment for the Game Boy Color in 2000.

The first game in the series to be released outside Japan was the 2001 action role-playing spin-off Dokapon: Monster Hunter, developed and published by Asmik Ace Entertainment for the Game Boy Advance.

The fourth main entry, Dokapon DX: Wataru Sekai wa Oni Darake, was developed and published by Asmik Ace Entertainment for the GameCube in 2003, and for the PlayStation 2 in 2004.

The fifth main entry, Dokapon the World, was co-developed by Asmik Ace Entertainment and Sting Entertainment, and published by Asmik Ace Entertainment for the PlayStation 2 in 2004.

A mobile game, Dokapon Quest!, was released in 2011 by Silicon Studio for the service Mobage.

After 9 years of dormancy, Sting Entertainment revived the series with a collaboration with Aquaplus’ visual novel Utawarerumono, Dokapon Up! Mugen no Roulette; it was released for Nintendo Switch and PlayStation 4 in Japan in 2020.

A remaster of Dokapon Kingdom titled Dokapon Kingdom: Connect, was released on Nintendo Switch and Windows in 2023. It featured a new multiplayer mode.

A remaster of Dokapon Ikari no Tekken, was released for Nintendo Switch in Japan in 2024, with a worldwide release for Windows under the title Dokapon! Sword of Fury in 2025.

A sequel to Dokapon Kingdom, Dokapon Kingdom: Connect 2, is scheduled to release in the summer of 2027.

=== Main series ===
| Game | Details |
|---|---|
| Kessen! Dokapon Oukoku IV: Densetsu no Yuusha Tachi Original release dates: JP: December 10, 1993; NA: April 14, 2009 | Release years by system: 1993 – Super Famicom; 2008 – Nintendo DS |
| Kessen! Dokapon Oukoku IV: Densetsu no Yuusha Tachi Original release dates: JP: December 10, 1993; NA: April 14, 2009 | Notes: Known in Japan as Kessen! Dokapon Oukoku IV: Densetsu no Yuusha Tachi (決戦!ドカポン王国IV ～伝説の勇者たち～, lit. Decisive Battle! Dokapon Kingdom IV ~Legendary Heroes~); Developed and published by Asmik Ace Entertainment; Remade by Suzak Inc. in 2008 as Dokapon Journey, known in Japan as Dokapon Journey! Nakayoku Kenka Shite♪ (ドカポンジャーニー! 〜なかよくケンカしてっ♪〜, lit. Dokapon Journey! ~Have a good fight♪~); Dokapon Journey published by Sting Entertainment in Japan and by Atlus USA in North America |
| Dokapon 3・2・1 – Arashi o Yobu Yuujou Original release dates: JP: December 2, 1994; NA: October 14, 2008; EU: March 26, 2010 | Release years by system: 1993 – Super Famicom; 2007 – PlayStation 2; 2008 – Wii; 2023 – Nintendo Switch, Windows |
| Dokapon 3・2・1 – Arashi o Yobu Yuujou Original release dates: JP: December 2, 1994; NA: October 14, 2008; EU: March 26, 2010 | Notes: Known in Japan as Dokapon 3・2・1 – Arashi o Yobu Yuujou (ドカポン3・2・1 ～嵐を呼ぶ友情～, lit. Dokapon 3・2・1 ~Stormy Friendship~); Developed and published by Asmik Ace Entertainment; Remade by Sting Entertainment as Dokapon Kingdom in 2007; Dokapon Kingdom published by Sting Entertainment in Japan, by Atlus USA in North America, and by Bigben Interactive in Europe; Remastered version of Dokapon Kingdom, titled Dokapon Kingdom: Connect, published by Compile Heart in Japan and by Idea Factory worldwide |
| Dokapon! Ikari no Tekken Original release dates: JP: November 5, 1998; WW: January 21, 2025 | Release years by system: 1998 – PlayStation; 2024 – Nintendo Switch; 2025 – Windows |
| Dokapon! Ikari no Tekken Original release dates: JP: November 5, 1998; WW: January 21, 2025 | Notes: Known in Japan as Dokapon! Ikari no Tekken (ドカポン! 怒りの鉄剣, lit. Dokapon! Iron Sword of Fury); Developed and published by Asmik Ace Entertainment; Remastered version, Dokapon! Sword of Fury, developed and published by Sting Entertainment worldwide |
| Dokapon DX: Wataru Sekai wa Oni Darake Original release dates: JP: April 10, 2003 | Release years by system: 2003 – GameCube; 2004 – PlayStation 2 |
| Dokapon DX: Wataru Sekai wa Oni Darake Original release dates: JP: April 10, 2003 | Notes: Known in Japan as Dokapon DX: Wataru Sekai wa Oni Darake (ドカポンDX ~わたる世界はオニだらけ~, lit. Dokapon DX ~The world is full of demons~); Developed and published by Asmik Ace Entertainment |
| Dokapon the World Original release date: JP: November 3, 2004 | Release years by system: 2004 – PlayStation 2 |
| Dokapon the World Original release date: JP: November 3, 2004 | Notes: Known in Japan as Dokapon the World (ドカポン・ザ・ワールド); Co-developed by Asmik Ace Entertainment and Sting Entertainment, and published by Asmik Ace Entertainment |
| Dokapon Kingdom: Connect 2 Original release date: WW: Summer 2027 | Release years by system: 2027 – Microsoft Windows, Nintendo Switch, Nintendo Switch 2 |
| Dokapon Kingdom: Connect 2 Original release date: WW: Summer 2027 | Notes: Developed by Sting, co-published by Compile Heart and Idea Factory International |

=== Spin-offs ===
| Game | Details |
|---|---|
| Dokapon Gaiden: Honoo no Audition Original release date: JP: December 1, 1995 | Release years by system: 1995 – Super Famicom, Satellaview |
| Dokapon Gaiden: Honoo no Audition Original release date: JP: December 1, 1995 | Notes: Known in Japan as Dokapon Gaiden: Honoo no Audition (ドカポン外伝 炎のオーディション, lit. Dokapon Side Story: Fiery Audition); Developed by Earthly Soft and published by Asmik Ace Entertainment |
| Dokapon?! MillenniumQuest Original release date: JP: July 14, 2000 | Release years by system: 2000 – Game Boy Color |
| Dokapon?! MillenniumQuest Original release date: JP: July 14, 2000 | Notes: Known in Japan as Dokapon?! Millennium Quest (ドカポン?! ミレニアムクエスト); Developed and published by Asmik Ace Entertainment; Action role-playing game |
| Dokapon: Monster Hunter Original release date: JP: August 3, 2001; NA: October 30, 2001; EU: June 21, 2002 | Release years by system: 2001 – Game Boy Advance |
| Dokapon: Monster Hunter Original release date: JP: August 3, 2001; NA: October 30, 2001; EU: June 21, 2002 | Notes: Known in Japan as Dokapon-Q: Monster Hunter! (ドカポンQ モンスターハンター!); Developed and published by Asmik Ace Entertainment; Action role-playing game |
| Dokapon Quest! Original release date: JP: August 9, 2011 | Release years by system: 2011 – Mobile phones |
| Dokapon Quest! Original release date: JP: August 9, 2011 | Notes: Known in Japan as Dokapon Quest! (ドカポンクエスト); Distributed by Silicon Studio via the Mobage service |
| Dokapon Up! Mugen no Roulette Original release date: JP: December 10, 2020 | Release years by system: 2020 – Nintendo Switch, PlayStation 4 |
| Dokapon Up! Mugen no Roulette Original release date: JP: December 10, 2020 | Notes: Known in Japan as Dokapon UP! Mugen no Roulette (ドカポンUP! 夢幻のルーレット, lit. Dokapon Up! Dream Roulette); Developed by Sting Entertainment and published by Aquaplus; Crossover with the Utawarerumono franchise |

== Gameplay ==
Release timeline
| 1993 | Kessen! Dokapon Oukoku IV: Densetsu no Yuusha Tachi |
| 1994 | Dokapon 3-2-1 |
| 1995 | Dokapon Gaiden: Hono no Audition |
1996–1997
| 1998 | Dokapon Ikari no Tekken |
1999
| 2000 | Dokapon MillenniumQuest |
| 2001 | Dokapon: Monster Hunter |
2002
| 2003 | Dokapon DX: Wataru Sekai wa Oni Darake |
| 2004 | Dokapon the World |
2005–2006
| 2007 | Dokapon Kingdom |
| 2008 | Dokapon Journey |
2009–2010
| 2011 | Dokapon Quest! |
2012–2019
| 2020 | Dokapon Up! Mugen no Roulette |
2021–2022
| 2023 | Dokapon Kingdom: Connect |
| 2024 | Dokapon! Sword of Fury |
2025–2026
| 2027 | Dokapon Kingdom: Connect 2 |

Players take on the role of adventurers with the goal of earning the most money at the end of each board, done by spinning a roulette to determine the number of spaces the player will move. This is done not only by saving towns from monsters, in the style of turn-based RPG battles, but also by gathering valuables after becoming the leader of said towns. The character with the most valuables by the end of the game wins.

The player has the option to use items before spinning, the effects of which range from recovering health to causing damage to other characters. When in the actual battle, the player chooses from one of four commands. After winning the battle, the player then receives money and experience points, leveling up after enough have been gained, like in a standard RPG.
