= Baroque (video game) =

1998 video game

- North American PS2 cover art featuring the character Archangel
- Developer: Sting Entertainment
- Publishers: Sega Saturn, PlayStation; JP: Entertainment Software Publishing; PlayStation 2, Wii; JP: Sting Entertainment; NA: Atlus USA; EU: Rising Star Games; Nintendo Switch; JP: Sting Entertainment
- Directors: Kazunari Yonemitsu; Noriaki Kaneko; Daizo Harada (Remake)
- Producer: Takeshi Santo
- Designers: Kazunari Yonemitsu; Haruhiko Matsuzaki
- Programmers: Shinichi Abe; Satoshi Miyauchi; Ryuji Kudo
- Artists: Hyōju Mū; Eisaku Kitō; Kenjiro Suzuki (Remake)
- Writers: Kazunari Yonemitsu; Kengo Morita
- Composers: Masaharu Iwata; Shigeki Hayashi (Remake)
- Platforms: Sega Saturn; PlayStation; PlayStation 2; Wii; iOS; Nintendo Switch
- Release: May 21, 1998: Sega Saturn; JP: May 21, 1998 PlayStation; JP: October 28, 1999 PlayStation 2; JP: June 28, 2007; NA: April 8, 2008; EU: August 15, 2008 International; JP: October 23, 2008 Wii; JP: March 13, 2008; NA: April 8, 2008; EU: August 15, 2008 iOS; WW: December 28, 2012 Nintendo Switch; JP: November 12, 2020
- Genres: Role-playing, roguelike
- Mode: Single-player

Baroque (Note: Barokku (Japanese: バロック)) is a roguelike role-playing video game developed by Sting Entertainment. It was originally released for the Sega Saturn in 1998 by Entertainment Software Publishing, then ported to the PlayStation the following year. A remake for PlayStation 2 and Wii was released in Japan by Sting Entertainment in 2007, and later overseas in 2008 from Atlus USA (North America) and Rising Star Games (Europe). This version was later released on iOS in 2012, and an enhanced port of the original version on Nintendo Switch in 2020.

Baroque is set in a post-apocalyptic world where an experiment to understand the Absolute God caused devastating climate change, with surviving humans becoming physically twisted by manifestations of guilt. This experiment was led by a being called Archangel. The protagonist is guided by Archangel through the Neuro Tower to find the Absolute God and fix the world. All versions of the game feature dungeon-crawling through randomly-generated floors of the Neuro Tower, with deaths in the dungeon advancing the narrative. The original uses a first-person perspective, while the remake includes a third-person camera and adjustable difficulty levels.

The game was conceived by Kazunari Yonemitsu, who was involved in multiple aspects of its design and created the narrative. Originally in production for the PC-9800 series, Yonemitsu's wish for 3D graphics resulted in it shifting to the Saturn. Its dark tone, a reaction to Yonemitsu's previous work, was influenced by European cinema and film noir. The gameplay drew inspiration from Torneko no Daibōken: Fushigi no Dungeon. The music was composed by Masaharu Iwata, who blended ambient noise and sound samples into the tracks. Baroque was supported with several supplementary products, including a visual novel based on a promotional novella. The remake featured new staff and several changes, including redone character designs from Kenjiro Suzuki and replacement music by in-house composer Shigeki Hayashi. The game saw generally mixed reviews from critics.

== Gameplay ==
While sharing basic gameplay, the original (top) and remake (bottom) feature perspective and graphical differences.

Baroque is a roguelike role-playing video game; taking on the role of the amnesiac player character, the player navigates the Neuro Tower, dungeon crawling through randomly-generated floors, with the aim of reaching the bottom floor. The original game and the remake share basic gameplay, but also have several differences. The original version takes place using a first-person perspective using tank controls, navigating 3D environments while interacting with 2D sprites of characters and enemies. The remake mainly plays from a third-person perspective using entirely 3D graphics, using full analogue movement with more action-based gameplay and combat, in addition to remade graphics and adjustments to the progression.

The game begins outside of the Neuro Tower with no items or experience points. Before entering the Neuro Tower, the player is presented with a gun called the Angelic Rifle with limited ammunition that kills enemies in one hit. During exploration, the player can find items, melee weapons, and equipment scattered around the tower at random and by defeating enemies—which also grants the player experience points, allowing the player character to gain levels and become more powerful. Upon death, rather than resulting in a game over, the protagonist is transported back to the home town; these deaths progress the narrative and unlock new dialogue and areas. By throwing an item into a consciousness orb, the player can retrieve it from one of the non-player characters on the next playthrough. Up to five items can be saved in this manner at the start, but the number can increase if certain conditions are met. The Neuro Tower expands after certain conditions are met.

The game uses two gauges to measure the protagonist's health: hit points and vitality. The vitality gauge constantly drains during gameplay. If it empties, the hit point gauge will begin to drain. Both gauges can be refilled by eating various forms of flesh and hearts to restore hit points and vitality respectively. If flesh or a heart is consumed while the relevant stat is filled to maximum, the protagonist's maximum hit points or vitality will increase by a fixed amount. Alongside exploring the Neuro Tower, players can interact with non-playable characters in the one town outside the tower, being able to complete quests. Portals found on each floor of the Neuro Tower will transport the player to the next floor. A recurring element is item management, as the player has a limited inventory and can use, discard or throw items. Many consumable items are unidentified prior to eating them. Items thrown at enemies can cause damage depending on what they are.

== Plot ==
=== Setting and characters ===
Set after a world-altering cataclysm called the Blaze that took place on May 14, 2032, Baroque focuses on a nameless, mute, and amnesiac protagonist. Early on, he finds himself tasked with purifying the Meta-Beings, once-human creatures that have lost themselves to the delusions inside them, and reaching the bottom floor of a tower to gain redemption for his forgotten sin. Through his interactions with the other characters and unlocked cutscenes, the player learns about the back-story and characters.

Outside the tower, the protagonist encounters several characters: Collector, a young boy who stores items as a hobby; Coffin Man, who maintains an underground training dungeon; Baroquemonger, who possess the ability to read an Idea Sephirah; the Horned Girl, who can voice the thoughts of anyone near her, and lost her identity to shield herself; the Bagged One, who speaks the words of others instead of her own; Longneck, who took part in research; and the Sentry Angel, who guards the research facility. Within the tower, he finds other characters: Alice; Eliza, who seeks to create Consciousness Orbs by using the protagonist's Idea Sephirah and help heal the Absolute God; Doctor Angelicus; Fist & Scythe; Neophyte; the Littles, who exist as the embodiment of pain; and the Archangel, who lies impaled on a Consciousness Orb at the tower's bottom floor, and implores the protagonist to purify the Absolute God.

=== Story ===
Prior to the start of the game, the Order of Malkuth discovered that the Absolute God had returned to earth. They also found Consciousness Orbs, gigantic sensory orbs used by the Absolute God to compress reality, scattered around the world. The Malkuth Order wanted to learn more about the Absolute God, so they experimented with them. Subtle distortions in reality started appearing and people slowly began to change. The Archangel's sister was the first person to become a Meta-Being. The Malkuth Order, led by the Archangel, created artificial Consciousness Orbs to help stop the distortions, but the false orbs only added to the distortions. The Archangel removed "pain" from the Absolute God, and poured corrupted data into the Consciousness Orbs to keep the Absolute God from fixing the distortions. He then harvested the Absolute God's pain as the Littles.

Littles, the embodiment of pain, are creatures that can only live inside of "ampules" and were cultivated by Doctor Angelicus and Longneck. Their purpose was to be used as bullets for the Angelic Rifle, so that the Archangel can purify the Absolute God and take its Idea Sephirath to make a new world. The Koriel, a group of high-ranking members within the Malkuth Order, tried to stop the Archangel; they decided to make direct contact with the God through fusion to hear its will. A member of the Koriel, the protagonist had a conjoined twin brother, with whom he shared a heart. Only one of them could function at a time, and both were dying. The Koriel sacrificed the older brother, and picked the protagonist for the fusion. When the Archangel learned about the Koriel's plan, he interrupted the fusion and caused the Blaze. The Absolute God created Alice and Eliza to fill the gap left by him. While the God gained a voice, the protagonist became mute, but gained the ability to purify others. The consciousness of protagonist's deceased older brother got absorbed by the Consciousness Orbs and fused with him during the Dabar.

In the end, the protagonist fuses with the Absolute God along with Alice, Eliza and the Littles. Although the world is still distorted, they decide not to purify it; instead, they accept the distortion and thereby achieve freedom.

== Development ==
The concept for Baroque was created by Sting Entertainment founder Kazunari Yonemitsu, who acted as the game's director, story writer and co-designer. Yonemitsu had spent much of his career in the video game industry creating games with a lighter or comedic tone, and when he tried doing anything darker it was vetoed by others. After working on Treasure Hunter G, Yonemitsu began creating a game concept which would take a darker approach than his other work, with Baroque emerging from combining two other drafts themed after Russian narratives. The game design concepts were "multi-layered development", "shifting structure", "freedom", "space", and "strategy". While these concepts remained unchanged, Yonemitsu felt that nearly everything else about the project had. The system design of randomly generated dungeon floors came first, then Yonemitsu created a narrative to fit that. An early prototype was developed for the PC-9800 series, but the platform was unable to handle 3D graphics. With the arrival of the Sega Saturn, production was moved to that platform. Production began in 1996. During an early interview, Yonemitsu described the production process as "going back to basics" with game design and flow. For the design approach, Yonemitsu drew from Torneko no Daibōken: Fushigi no Dungeon and found ways of innovating on the formula, including the game's tone and 3D graphics. The game was produced by Takeshi Santo, with programming being led by Shinichi Abe.

There were multiple key words for the narrative including "healing", "imprisonment", "girl", "brain" and "instruments of punishment". The main theme was how people could free themselves from aspects of life that leave them unaware of sin. Yonemitsu started out with the concept of a protagonist healing the world, but was influenced in his portrayal of that role following the Tokyo subway sarin attack by the cult Aleph. The narrative was designed to be contrary to the linear movie-like progression of narratives in other games. The darker art style drew from Danish and Eastern European cinema, together with film noir. As illustrative references for the narrative and tone, Yonemitsu used Blade Runner, Delicatessen and the "Cannon Fodder" narrative from the anthology film Memories. Another influence on the narrative was the movie Summer Vacation 1999. The Neuro Tower setting was decided upon after Yonemitsu noticed a common motif of towers relating to punishment in the works of Edogawa Ranpo and Seishi Yokomizo. Despite the grim tone, Yonemitsu wrote a hopeful element into the ending. Several terms and words within the world were written to be read several different ways, resulting in different and often clashing meanings. An example used in promotion was the game's title. While the original term "Baroque" referred to an artistic movement focusing on deep colors and extravagant design, the game took the potential source phrase barroco ("distorted pearl") and used it to refer to the emerging distortions in the game's world.

The game's characters were designed by Hyōju Mū. The character models and CGI sections were created by American CGI production studio Inertia Pictures, while the game's CGI design was led by Eisaku Kitō. Inertia Pictures was brought on by Yonemitsu to give the game a unique aesthetic, with Inertia Pictures quickly understanding his vision and agreeing to collaborate. Communicating with Inertia Pictures caused some issues due to the time zone and language differences. Kitō began his work on the project in mid-1995. Due to the tower interior's aesthetic, Kitō created a recurring "uterus" aesthetic when designing the enemies, treating them as microorganisms infecting a womb. Kitō's main design inspiration was the work of Philip Dexsay on the 1992 Winter Olympics opening ceremony. The use of angels and presence of the Absolute God were not intended to directly reference any religion, but came about due to Yonemitsu's interest in their imagery and roles. The enemy character designs were themed after tarot cards.

=== Music ===
The music of Baroque was composed and arranged by Masaharu Iwata, who had previously worked with Sting on Treasure Hunter G. When asking for music, Yonemitsu requested tracks that did not sound like music, using the natural sound backgrounds of documentaries as reference for creating natural emotion in an audience without using a separate musical track. Sometimes as descriptions, Yonemitsu would send Iwata a short poem, but even then it was difficult for Iwata to create satisfactory tracks. When Iwata complained about a lack of reference material, Yonemitsu found some suitable musical tracks, notably music from Night Head and Adiemus. The tracks were designed to be listened to alongside the in-game sound effects.

The first song created for the soundtrack was "Sanctuary". Originally planned as a story location theme, it was reused as a dungeon track. While an opening theme was created by in-house composer Toshiaki Sakoda, Iwata was asked to create a new opening theme. Something he was able to do on the project that was new to him was adding in sound effects to increase the ambience impact of his tracks. The track was half a minute too long, so in-game it was cut short while the album release featured the full track. The track "Confusion" was made entirely with sound effect samples. He considered his strangest theme to be the vocal track "Namu Ami", which he described as a meaningless Buddhist-like chant. His last song was the staff roll "Hold Baroque Inside", which was a subdued piece based on the game's story themes. Iwata described both the game's content and the music he had to create for it as entirely new to him at the time, and was impressed by Yonemitsu's vision despite not understanding it at times. Yonemitsu named all the tracks.

An official soundtrack album, which included all tracks from the game alongside remixes and the original opening, released by DigiCube on May 21, 1998. Following release, the original album became a rarity, and demand grew for an official re-release of the music. Iwata eventually decided to re-release the music through Basiscape, a company he worked for at the time founded by frequent collaborator Hitoshi Sakimoto. The reissue was released on May 14, 2012. Alongside the original tracks, four new pieces were included; Iwata's two demo tracks from early production, and two new tracks; one of the tracks was a vocal theme with lyrics by Yonemitsu and sung by Haruko Aoki.

=== Remake ===
A remake of Baroque for the PlayStation 2 (PS2), based on the PlayStation port, was announced in January 2007. Santo and Abe returned as producer and lead programmer respectively. The characters for the remake were designed by Kenjiro Suzuki, while the music was entirely redone by Yggdra Union composer Shigeki Hayashi. The new opening animation was created by Point Pictures. The remake also included full voice acting. A version for the Wii was announced in January 2008. This version, titled Baroque for Wii, included implementation of motion controls, a first-person camera perspective similar to the original version, and widescreen support.

The remake was localized for a Western release by Atlus USA, which included a full dub. The localization was handled by Clayton Chan and Bill Alexander. During this period, Atlus was continuing to support the PS2 platform despite the release of seventh-generation consoles. The team were unworried about the lack of mechanical changes between the original and the remake, as the original version had never released outside Japan. While the mature storyline presented few problems for the team, the nonconventional way it was delivered provided a challenge. The team had to go against their previous tactics of smoothing out apparent inconsistencies or out-of-place references in dialogue as those were a key part of the narrative delivery. Chan compared it as having to not do his job on the title, which was difficult for him. Due to its gameplay and style, Atlus USA deliberately described the title as "hardcore" during promotion. During talks with Sting regarding the PS2 version, Atlus learned that the Wii version was in development, so they licensed both for release.

== Release ==
Baroque was first announced in 1996, shortly after production began. Pre-orders for the game opened in January 1998. As a pre-order bonus, a promotional disc titled Baroque Report CD Data File was included. It contained artwork and music samples from the game. This content was later re-released on the game's website. The game was published for the Saturn by Entertainment Software Publishing on May 21, 1998.

The game was later ported to the PlayStation, releasing on October 28, 1999, with the subtitle Distorted Delusions. Several changes were made to the port including adjustments to floor generation, a new vendor in the town, and decreased difficulty. There was also an opening narration during one of the demo movies provided by actress Minami Takayama. She was brought in due to her role in Summer Vacation 1999. A new vocal theme, "Black in truth", was composed for the PlayStation release, and released by Meldac Records as both a single and part of a mini album titled Read my Lips. The theme was composed by Iwata at the company's insistence, though Yonemitsu disliked it and felt a vocal theme did not fit the game's tone. Iwata got together a small vocal group he dubbed Baroque Mode to perform the new theme, but had it playing in the game's new demo sequence as he disliked replacing his original opening track. A budget edition of the port was released on March 8, 2000. A port of the original version for the Nintendo Switch was released on November 12, 2020, in Japan. The port includes the contents of Baroque Report, screen resolution options, and added openings from the PlayStation port and the remake.

The remake was originally released in Japan for PS2 on June 28, 2007. The Wii edition was released on March 13 the following year. A soundtrack album for the remake was released on July 12 by Sting. The North American release was announced in December 2007 alongside the planned Wii port. The game ended up being delayed twice, and both versions released on April 8. In Europe, the game was published by Rising Star Games on August 15. An international version based on the Western PS2 version was released in Japan on October 23, 2008. The remake was later ported to iOS, releasing in Japan and the West on December 28, 2012. It featured a score attack mode, and allowed players to experience the game's opening section for free before buying the full game.

=== Additional media ===
Multiple other game projects were created by Sting Entertainment supporting the series. A promotional prequel novella titled Baroquism: Syndrome was written by Mariko Shimizu, originally serialised in Sega Saturn Magazine. Due to being released prior to its release, Shimizu had to be careful not to spoil the game's narrative.

Another story joining the two narratives, Baroque Interludium, was likewise serialised in Sega Saturn Magazine, then later released through the game's website.

Shimizu's novella was adapted into a visual novel. Titled Baroque Syndrome, it released for PlayStation on July 27, 2000. Baroque Syndrome was re-released for iOS and Android on January 11, 2019.

A 2D top-down shooter set in the game's universe called Baroque Shooting was released for Microsoft Windows on July 17, 2000. In this spin-off, players as an Angel navigate the Neuro Tower, a mysterious, enemy-filled structure and environmental hazards aiming to reach the final boss at the deepest level. The game emphasizes strategic play, allowing players to collect items that modify their unit's attack power, attack pattern, and speed. The order and combination of these items let players fine-tune their setup. An updated version of the game, BAROQUE SHOOTING: REVERSED was released on December 17, 2025, for Steam and Nintendo Switch. This version retains all of the aspects of the original game with new features such as a redesigned HUD, an art gallery, wallpaper for the game's title screen, enhanced graphics, the ability to continue after a Game Over, and remastered background music.

A further title is Baroque Typing, a themed typing game released for Windows, first as a downloadable game on May 22, 2000; then as a packaged release on March 20, 2003.

A manga based on the game's universe, Baroque: Ketsuraku no Paradaimu, (Note: (BAROQUE 欠落のパラダイム; lit. Baroque: The Missing Paradigm)) was written by Shinshuu Ueda and serialised in Monthly GFantasy and were published in three volumes by Square Enix from March 2001 to March 2002. The manga was later reprinted in two volumes by Reissue Dot-Com in January and March 2017.

An online game based on Baroque was also announced as being in production for a release between 2005 and 2006, though no further information was released. The remake was adapted into a first-person shooter format and retitled Baroque FPS, releasing for iOS on December 26, 2011.

A 3D top-down action platforming game BAROQUE ~ Become a Meta-Being was released on January 24, 2022, for both iOS and Android devices. The game is a free spin-off and follows the story of a human who reincarnated as a meta-being called Grue, after mankind's collapse due to the Great Heat. Players guide Grue through the ever-changing Neuro Tower with gameplay similar to Frogger. BAROQUE ~ Become a Meta-Being ~ Revive is a updated version released for Steam and Nintendo Switch on December 17, 2025, with the original gameplay and new features such as a brand-new Countdown Mode with the challenge is seeing how far the player can go with the ability to respawn upon death with different rewards from those in Original Mode. A new camera option, Another View, has also been added to allow players to switch from the top-down Normal View to a dynamic, close-up perspective. Other improvements include interface adjustments, music, graphics, and controls.

== Reception ==
Reception

Aggregate scores
Aggregator	Score
GameRankings	58% (PS2); 53% (Wii)
Metacritic	60/100 (PS2); 50/100 (Wii)

Review scores
Publication	Score
Famitsu	25/40 (SS); 27/40 (PS2)
GameSpot	6.5
IGN	5.4
Official Nintendo Magazine	41%
RPGFan	78%
Sega Saturn Magazine (JP)	7.66

Baroque received mixed reviews, with a combined score on GameRankings of 53% for the Wii version and 58% for the PS2 version. The most common complaint focused on the game's extreme difficulty curve. RPGFan explained "...it is not for everyone. Only those who truly appreciate rogue-like RPGs will be able to get the most enjoyment out of it."

Daemon Hatfield of IGN felt that while Baroque had a "unique" concept, it lacked direction. Hatfield criticized the game concept as "convoluted" and rated the game "5.4". GameSpot's Lark Anderson described it as "[a] fiendishly difficult, randomly generated dungeon crawler that at times can be an incredible work of interactive fiction, and at other times, a muddled mess." Anderson praised the variety of items and weapons, and the "strong and compelling" story, but thought the unconventional, deliberately unclear method of storytelling and lack of an introduction made it difficult for the player to care about it.
