= Touhou Spell Carnival =

2024 video game

- Developers: Sting, Compile Heart
- Publisher: Idea Factory International
- Platforms: Microsoft Windows; Nintendo Switch; PlayStation 4; PlayStation 5
- Release: PS4, PS5, Switch: JP: 6 June 2024; WW: 19 November 2024; Windows: WW: 7 May 2025
- Genre: Strategy

Touhou Spell Carnival (Note: Japanese: 東方スペルカーニバル) is a strategy role-playing video game developed by Sting and Compile Heart and published by Idea Factory International. It was released for Nintendo Switch, PlayStation 4, and PlayStation 5 in June 2024 in Japan and in November 2024 worldwide. The Windows version was released on 7 May 2025.

The game is based on Gensokyo of the Touhou series. The player controls shrine maiden Reimu, who compete in the Spell Carnival using her Spell Cards. The gameplay combines the bullet hell shoot ’em ups with tactical battles.

== Gameplay ==
Touhou Spell Carnival is a tactical role-playing game with the bullet hell gameplay of the Touhou series. The player is given 30 days to compete in the Spell Carnival. The player characters are Reimu Hakurei, Marisa Kirisame, Yukari Yakumo, Remilia Scarlet, and Sakuya Izayoi.

== Development and release ==
Touhou Spell Carnival was announced in October 2023 as one of seven titles in development by Compile Heart, which was going under transition to a new management structure at the time. It was developed in cooperation with Sting. The game features character illustrations by Katsuyuki Hirano. Compile Heart opened up an official website in November 2023.

The game was initially scheduled to be released in Japan 18 April, but it was delayed to 6 June. Idea Factory International published the Western release on 19 November 2025. The game was released both physically and digitally, but the physical release in Europe was released on 3 December. The Digital Deluxe Edition includes a digital art book and soundtrack. The Windows port was released on 7 May 2025 worldwide for Steam. In addition to the regular version and the Digital Deluxe Edition, Idea Factory International manufactured a Limited Edition that include Reimu and Marisa figures.

== Reception ==
Anime News Network's Grant Jones gave the game a positive review, praising the combination of real-time tactics, action RPG framework, and bullet hell combat.
