= To Heart 2: Dungeon Travelers =

2011 role-playing video game

- Japanese PSP cover art for To Heart 2: Dungeon Travelers

ToHeart2 ダンジョントラベラーズ (ToHeart2 Danjon Toraberaazu)
- Genre: Fantasy, harem, adventure
- Manga

To Heart 2 Another Days
- Written by: Aquaplus
- Illustrated by: S
- Published by: ASCII Media Works
- Magazine: Dengeki G's Festival! Comic
- Original run: July 26, 2008 – August 26, 2010
- Volumes: 2
- Light novel

To Heart 2: Final Dragon Chronicle Sono Go
- Written by: Takuya Baba
- Illustrated by: Ushio Komone
- Published by: Harvest
- Published: February 20, 2011
- Volumes: 1
- Video game
- Developer: Sting
- Publisher: Aquaplus
- Genre: Role-playing video game
- Platform: PlayStation Portable, PlayStation Vita, Windows
- Released: June 30, 2011
- Original video animation
- Directed by: Junichi Sakata
- Produced by: Yūtarō Mochizuki; Hiroshi Takano; Keitarō Sunohara
- Written by: Takamitsu Kōno
- Music by: To Heart 2 TV (Note: 「ToHeart2(TV-series)」 フロンティアワークス より); Conisch; Kei Haneoka; To Heart 2 (PS2) (Note: 「ToHeart2(PS2)」 AQUAPLUS より); Shinya Ishikawa; Michio Kinugasa; Junya Matsuoka; Kazuhide Nakagami; Naoya Shimokawa
- Studio: Chaos Project
- Released: February 22, 2012 – July 25, 2012
- Runtime: 30 minutes each
- Episodes: 2
- Video game

Dungeon Travelers 2
- Developer: Sting
- Publisher: Aquaplus
- Genre: Role-playing video game
- Platform: PlayStation Portable, PlayStation Vita
- Released: March 27, 2013

To Heart 2: Dungeon Travelers (ToHeart2 ダンジョントラベラーズ, ToHeart2 Danjon Toraberaazu) is a role-playing video game developed by Sting and published by Aquaplus on June 30, 2011, for the PlayStation Portable in Japan only, and on February 15, 2024, for PC via Steam. The game is a spin-off from Leaf's To Heart 2 franchise, and gameplay highly resembles another To Heart 2 based minigame from the Windows visual novel Manaka de Ikuno!!, titled Final Dragon Chronicle: Guilty Requiem.

A manga version of the PC game was serialized in volume 2 of the To Heart 2 Another Days manga, which was published by ASCII Media Works. Harvest has published a single light novel based on the game, titled To Heart 2: Final Dragon Chronicle Sono Go. Two OVA anime series for To Heart 2: Dungeon Travelers have been produced by Aquaplus, and was released from February 22 to July 25, 2012.

== Gameplay ==
The player assumes the role of Takaaki Kouno, the main protagonist of To Heart 2, but this character cannot participate in battles directly. Instead, the player controls what skills and attacks the girls Takaaki encounters use. In the beginning, the player will start off with two party members, Konomi Yuzuhara and Tamaki Kousaka, with these two characters, more girls can be unlocked to fight in the party. In order to unlock more party members, the player must defeat certain characters in the To Heart 2 series, and then they will join the player's side.

The party will often encounter enemies, which offer little experience compared to boss battles. In the PC version, a maximum of four people can be in the party, whilst in the PSP version, it is five. Each character has a different occupation, when the character reaches certain levels, they can advance to a higher class. The career changes for a fighter at level 15 are Paladin and Dark Knight, and at level 30, the career changes are Valkyrie, Samurai, and Dark Lord. The career changes for a magic user at level 15 are Sorceress, Enchantress, and Priest, and at level 30, the career changes are Witch, Magical Princess, Sage, and Bishop. The career changes for a scout at level 15 are Archer and Assassin, and at level 30, the career changes are Sniper, Treasure Hunter, and Kunoichi. Lastly, the career changes for a maid at level 15 are Bard and Dance, and at level 30, the career changes are Diva, High School Girl, Idol Master. Each class has a different costume.

All of the characters have their own skills and special attacks, they can be learnt by earning skill points which are obtained when the party levels up. There are six different types of skills:

- Passive Skills: Effects of the skill apply to the entire party which is always activated.
- Skill-based Skills that activate immediately when in combat.
- Magic-based Skills: If in combat, there is a cast time for magic users to activate their spells, but if attacked by an enemy in the process of doing so, the skill will be cancelled.
- Unique Skills: Added in the PSP version, it is the skill of a specific character, which can be strengthened.
- Party Skills: Added in the PSP version, a skill is activated by party members.
- Cooperation Skills: Added in the PSP version, the skill can only be activated if the party meets the conditions/requirements (occupation, equipment).

Items can be obtained in the dungeons, or bought from a shop. There are weapons, armor, and recovery items. Recovery items are necessary to fill back up a party member's health bar, or their magic power. If their health reaches 0, that character can no longer participate in the battle, unless they are revived.

== Plot ==
After Maryan's science experiment, the To Heart 2 characters are thrown into a fantasy RPG world, and they learn that the only way to return to their normal lives is to find and defeat the final boss.

== Characters ==
- Konomi Yuzuhara: Takaaki's childhood friend, and a magic user.
- Tamaki Kousaka: another childhood friend of Takaaki's, she is a fighter.
- Manaka Komaki: the representative of Takaaki's class, she is a magic user.
- Karin Sasamori: the only member of the 'mystery club', she is a scout.
- Sango Himeyuri: the older twin sister of Ruri, she is a magic user.
- Ruri Himeyuri: Ruri is the younger of the Himeyuri twins, and she is a fighter.
- Yuma Tonami: Manaka's close friend, she is a scout.
- Lucy Maria Misora: an alien girl who communicates with animals, she is a magic user.
- Yuki Kusakabe: a mysterious girl who visits the school at night, she is a maid.
- Sasara Kusugawa: the student council president, she is a fighter.
- Maryan: the former student council president, she is a maid.
- Harumi Kouno: a highly energetic robot who declares herself to be Takaaki's lover, she is a fighter.
- Silfa: a robot who is Takaaki's personal maid, she is a maid.
- Chie Yoshioka: one of Konomi's main friends from junior high school, she is a fighter.
- Michiru Yamada: a soft-spoken girl who is also a friend of Konomi's, she is a magic user.
- Ikuno Komaki: Manaka's younger sister, she is a scout.
- Nanako: a girl from a primary school, she is a magic user.
- Haruka Yuzuhara: Konomi's mother, she is a maid.
- Ilfa: a robot designed by Sango, she is a scout.

== Development and release ==
=== Game ===
To Heart 2: Dungeon Travelers was developed by Sting, and published by Aquaplus for the PlayStation Portable. It was officially released on June 30, 2011, as an all ages version of the PC game Final Dragon Chronicle: Guilty Requiem, which is one of the four games contained inside Manaka de Ikuno!!, which was released in both limited and regular editions on December 18, 2009. A PlayStation Vita version of the game was released on April 30, 2015. An enhanced port featuring upgraded resolution, custom controls (with support for keyboard and mouse), auto dungeon mapping and more, was released on PC via Steam and Johren on February 15, 2024.

=== Printed media ===
Before the game's release, a manga titled To Heart Another Days was published by ASCII Media Works, and serialized in the Dengeki G's Festival! Comic magazine from July 26, 2008, to August 26, 2010. A comic version of the PC game Final Dragon Chronicle: Guilty Requiem was featured in volume 2 of the manga. The manga was written by Aquaplus. A light novel for To Heart 2: Dungeon Travelers was published by Harvest on February 20, 2011, titled To Heart 2: Final Dragon Chronicle Sono Go. It was written by Takuya Baba and illustrated by Ushio Komone.

=== Anime ===
Two OVAs for To Heart 2: Dungeon Travelers were produced by Aquaplus and Chaos Project, and were released in 2012: the first was on February 22, and the second on July 25. The anime was directed by Jun'ichi Sakata. The opening theme is "Niji Iro no Mirai" by Suara, and the two endings are "Tada Hitotsu no Hoshi" by Rena Uehara and "Kono Sekai ni" by Akari Tsuda.

== Reception ==
On reviewing the 2024 PC version, Daniel Joseph of NookGaming described the story as frivolous but funny and praised the gameplay, despite having some issues such considering the dungeon design as frustrating.

== Sequels ==
A sequel to To Heart 2: Dungeon Travelers has been published by Aquaplus and developed by Sting, titled Dungeon Travelers 2 was released for the PlayStation Portable and PlayStation Vita on March 27, 2013. It consists of the same gameplay and system but featured different characters. Another PlayStation Vita game titled Dungeon Travelers 2-2, a sequel to Dungeon Travelers 2, was released on April 20, 2017.
