= Dungeon Travelers 2 =

2013 video game

- North American game cover
- Developer: Sting Entertainment
- Publishers: JP: Aquaplus; NA: Atlus; EU: NIS America; WW: Shiravune
- Director: Tsutomu Washimi
- Producer: Naoya Shimokawa
- Programmer: Naoki Shimasaku
- Artists: Misato Mitsumi; Hisashi Kawata; Tatsuki Amaduyu
- Writer: Sō Yoda
- Composers: Shinya Ishikawa; Junya Matsuoka; Michio Kinugasa
- Platforms: PlayStation Portable, PlayStation Vita, Microsoft Windows
- Release: PlayStation Portable: JP: March 28, 2013; PlayStation Vita: JP: September 25, 2014; NA: August 18, 2015; EU: October 16, 2015; Microsoft Windows: WW: June 9, 2023
- Genres: Dungeon crawler, role-playing
- Mode: Single-player

Dungeon Travelers 2: The Royal Library & the Monster Seal (Note: Japanese: ダンジョントラベラーズ2 王立図書館とマモノの封印, Hepburn: Danjontoraberāzutsū ōritsu toshokan to mamono no fuuin; "Dungeon Travelers 2: The Royal Library and Mamono's Seal") is a dungeon crawler role-playing video game developed by Sting Entertainment. It is the sequel to To Heart 2: Dungeon Travelers within the To Heart 2 franchise. Dungeon Travelers 2 was released on March 28, 2013, on the PlayStation Portable in Japan; an enhanced remake for the PlayStation Vita was released in Japan on September 25, 2014, and later in North America and Europe in 2015. A Microsoft Windows version was later released in 2023.

A sequel game for the PlayStation Vita titled Dungeon Travelers 2-2 was released in 2017 in Japan, and an English translation for Windows has since been released on the Johren game service. The game was slated to be released on Steam alongside To Heart 2: Dungeon Travelers but failed to pass the service's guidelines.

== Gameplay ==
The player takes on the role of an adventurer who is tasked with forming a party, navigating through dungeons, gathering treasure, and engaging in combat against monsters. Characters can be improved through learning skills and equipping items. The battle system is turn-based, and dungeon navigation takes place from a first-person perspective on a grid map. Party members can belong to five main classes (namely fighters, magic users, scouts, maids and spielers) which branch into over 30 different subclasses with unique skill sets and outfits as characters progress in specialisation. For instance, a fighter can develop into a paladin and a valkyrie, while magic users can transition into enchantresses and witches.

== Setting ==
Monsters have been appearing throughout the Kingdom of Romulea, and have become a threat to humanity. In order to subdue the monsters, an alchemist devised a magic seal able to constrain them. Fried Einhard, an adventurer dispatched by the Royal Library, discovers a damaged shrine on his journey to stop the monster uprising.

== Development ==
An example comparison of in-game imagery censored in the western release due to sexual themes. The bottom image depicts the original Japanese version featuring an enemy boss performing fellatio on a "spirit" while being covered in a mystery fluid, while the top image shows the expurgated western version with the lewd elements removed.

The original PlayStation Portable game was released in March 2013 by Aquaplus, as part of a long line of games and media derived from the erotic visual novel To Heart and its sequel, To Heart 2. Later in June 2014, the PlayStation Vita version was released, which included additional characters, redesigned dungeons, improved user interface, and improved quality illustrations.

The western localisation by Atlus features Japanese voices with English subtitles, and is compatible with the PlayStation TV. In order to ensure that the game remains acceptable for a western audience and meets a "Mature" ESRB rating, Atlus censored a total of four CG images within the game which were deemed to be overtly sexual in nature.

== Reception ==
The game has a score of 76 on Metacritic.

PlayStation Nation gave the game a review score of 8/10, stating that the game is an accommodating and gentle introduction to the dungeon crawler genre for newcomers. Meanwhile, Gaming Age scored the game B+, noting that while not all players will be able to accept the game's sexual content, it provides an adequate level of challenge and that the RPG mechanics are well detailed and enjoyable.

Gamecritics.com suggests that although the overall storyline is not particularly interesting, the character dialogue is engaging and that the artwork is well done. PlayStation Lifestyle rates the game 7.5 out of 10, praising the game's variety in terms of character upgrades, while similarly finding the story lacklustre. Capsule Computers and BioGamer Girl both gave an 8/10 rating, referring to the game as a satisfying dungeon crawling game with solid mechanics.

=== Sales ===
When it was released in Japan on the PSP, 32,000 copies of Dungeon Travelers 2 were sold, with 39,000 sold after two weeks, while the PS Vita version sold 16,000 copies in its launch week and 20,000 total after its second week.
