= TKO Super Championship Boxing =

1992 video game

- North American cover art
- Developer(s): Sting
- Publisher(s): SOFEL
- Composer(s): Mitsuhito Tanaka
- Platform(s): Super NES
- Release: JP: April 28, 1992; NA: October 1992; EU: 1993
- Genre(s): Fighting; Sports (boxing)
- Mode(s): Single-player; Multiplayer

TKO Super Championship Boxing - known in Japan as Kentou-Ou World Champion (拳闘王ワールドチャンピオン, "King Boxer World Champion") - is a boxing video game, developed by Sting Entertainment and published by SOFEL, which was released in 1992.

The former professional boxer Jirō Matsushima appears in the Japanese cover art. In 1997, he became the 56th Japanese bantamweight champion.

== Version differences ==
Gameplay and Story mode (Japanese version).

TKO is the abbreviation of "Technical Knock Out". The two titles are nearly identical, however the North American and PAL Region localizations of the game contain some differences from the original Japanese version. The characters are different, in the Japanese version there is a story mode where the player controls a unique boxer, while the other 13 boxers can only be chosen in the one-player (only as an opponent) and two-player mode, the player can also change the controller buttons and set the number of rounds (only four and ten) in the options mode. In the North American and European versions, eight boxers can be chosen from the very beginning in all modes (championship, 1p and 2p), and it is possible to choose one to ten rounds and set the difficulty level through the options.

== See also ==
- Teiken Boxing Gym
- Masato (kickboxer)
- Hideyuki Ohashi
- Takanori Gomi
