= IGPX: Immortal Grand Prix (video game) =

2006 video game

- Developer: Sting Entertainment
- Publisher: Namco Bandai Games
- Platform: PlayStation 2
- Release: JP: March 30, 2006; NA: September 12, 2006
- Genre: Racing game
- Modes: Single-player, multiplayer

IGPX: Immortal Grand Prix is a racing game based on the 2005–2006 anime TV series of the same name produced by Production I.G and Cartoon Network. It was developed by Sting Entertainment and published by Namco Bandai Games in 2006 for PlayStation 2.

The game received mixed reviews.

== Reception ==
Reception

Aggregate score
Aggregator	Score
Metacritic	55/100

Review scores
Publication	Score
Famitsu	27/40
GameDaily	5/10
GameSpot	5.9/10
GameZone	6/10
IGN	5.7/10
Official U.S. PlayStation Magazine	6/10
PlayStation: The Official Magazine	5/10

The game received "mixed or average" reviews according to the review aggregation website Metacritic. In Japan, Famitsu gave it a score of one eight, two sixes, and one seven for a total of 27 out of 40.
