= Dokapon DX: Wataru Sekai wa Oni Darake =

2003 video game

Dokapon DX
- PlayStation 2 cover art
- Developer: Asmik Ace Entertainment
- Publisher: Asmik Ace Entertainment
- Series: Dokapon
- Platforms: GameCube, PlayStation 2
- Release: GameCube: JP: April 10, 2003; PlayStation 2: JP: July 8, 2004
- Genre: Action
- Modes: Single-player, multiplayer

Dokapon DX: Wataru Sekai wa Oni Darake (ドカポンDX 〜わたる世界はオニだらけ〜) is a 2003 action game developed and released by Asmik Ace Entertainment exclusively in Japan for the GameCube on April 10, 2003. It is the fourth game in the Dokapon series. A PlayStation 2 version was released on July 8, 2004.
