= Wall Street Kid =

Video game for the Nintendo Entertainment System

- US cover art
- Developer: SOFEL
- Publisher: SOFEL
- Composer: Toshio Murai
- Series: The Money Game
- Platform: NES
- Release: JP: December 20, 1989; NA: June 1990
- Genres: Tycoon, social simulation, strategy
- Mode: Single-player

Wall Street Kid, released in Japan as The Money Game II: Kabutochou no Kiseki (ザ・マネーゲーム２ 兜町の奇跡) is a video game released by SOFEL for the NES . The game is a western spinoff of The Money Game series.

The player must prove the stockbroker's worth by taking $500,000 in seed money and growing it to $1,000,000 in order to gain a six-hundred-billion-dollar inheritance (equal to $1479 billion today) from the extremely wealthy Benedict family. Successfully investing it in the American stock market results in rewards like going shopping on the weekend and being able to acquire expensive items such as a house. The names of the companies listed in the stock market are slight variants on actual U.S. companies in operation at the time of the game's release. The player is also encouraged to spoil the stockbroker's girlfriend. The game ends if the player is unable to raise the money needed for a key item, such as a boat or the house, causing the stockbroker to be disowned by the family.

== Reception ==
Wall Street Kid

Review scores
Publication	Score
AllGame	4/5
Game Informer	7/10

In the "Nintendo Player" section, Electronic Gaming Monthly described it as "one of the most unique RPGs" that they saw at the Consumer Electronics Show. In a retrospective review, Game Informer wrote that the game featured "funny dialogue and addicting nature of money-making." Meanwhile, Jeff Irwin of AllGame referred to the game as "smooth and enjoyable" and compared the game to Brewster's Millions.
