= Dokapon Kingdom =

2007 role-playing video game

- North American PlayStation 2 cover art
- Developer: Sting Entertainment
- Publishers: JP: Sting Entertainment; NA: Atlus USA; EU: Bigben Interactive; (Wii); Connect: JP: Compile Heart; WW: Idea Factory
- Series: Dokapon
- Platforms: PlayStation 2 Wii; Nintendo Switch; Windows
- Release: PlayStation 2: JP: November 22, 2007; NA: October 14, 2008; Wii: JP: July 31, 2008; NA: October 14, 2008; EU: March 26, 2010; Nintendo Switch: JP: April 13, 2023; WW: May 9, 2023; Windows: WW: September 7, 2023
- Genre: Role-playing
- Modes: Single-player, multiplayer

Dokapon Kingdom (Note: Japanese: ドカポンキングダム, Hepburn: Dokapon Kingudamu) is a role-playing video game developed and published by Sting Entertainment for the PlayStation 2. It was released in Japan on November 22, 2007, and by Atlus USA in North America on October 14, 2008. It is a remake of the 1994 Super Famicom title, Dokapon 3・2・1 – Arashi o Yobu Yuujou.

The PlayStation 2 version was later re-released in Japan on November 20, 2008. A port to the Wii was released on July 31, 2008, as Dokapon Kingdom for Wii. The Wii version was published in North America by Atlus USA on October 14, 2008, and in Europe by Bigben Interactive on March 26, 2010. A Nintendo Switch remake published by Compile Heart, titled Dokapon Kingdom: Connect, was released in Japan on April 13, 2023, which was followed by an international release by Idea Factory on May 9, 2023. A Windows port of the remake was released on September 7, 2023.

A sequel based on Dokapon Kingdom: Connect, titled Dokapon Kingdom: Connect 2, is scheduled to release in the summer of 2027.

== Gameplay ==
The game is a hybrid board game and role-playing video game with modes varying from story mode to battle royale in which four players are assigned a mission. Players spin a spinner and then move to any spot on the board that is reachable by moving that number of spaces. Players will have the freedom to choose the direction they want to go. Landing on an "empty" yellow space or another player will typically cause a battle, but sometimes the player will encounter a strange traveler that may allow them to play them at a minigame, or hire their services to steal or harm the other players. The battle system plays out in roshambo style, with the attack option beating counter, the counter option beating strike, and the defend option resisting the attack option. Multiple magics and stat changes play out both in battle and on the game board, while class-specific skills increase with player's job level.

Three starting jobs are available to the new adventurer (warrior, thief, and magician), and following a pattern of leveling, eleven character jobs and darkling (if someone hears the whisper of the dark revenge, usually the current last place player) are possible. The game is won by the player with the most money at the end. The winner gets to marry the king's daughter if the player is male; the king makes an offer himself if the player is female, but will be rejected. However, regardless of gender, the winner takes the control of the kingdom.

== Plot ==
The game takes place in a fictional land called "Dokapon Kingdom" which is being attacked by an army of monsters. Seeing this, the king offers Penny, his daughter, to be married to the player who finishes the game with the most money. 2–4 adventurers hear this, and attempt to save the kingdom. The game ends when each of the main bosses are defeated, although the player can select other game options to make the game end faster.

== Development and release ==
A remake titled Dokapon Kingdom: Connect was announced in January 2023, developed by Sting and published by Compile Heart. An international release was published by Idea Factory International on 9 May 2023. It was later ported to Windows and released on 7 September 2023.

== Reception ==
Reception

Aggregate score
Aggregator	Score	
Aggregator	PS2	Wii
Metacritic	61/100	73/100

Review scores
Publication	Score	
Publication	PS2	Wii
1Up.com	N/A	C
Destructoid	N/A	8/10
Famitsu	26/40	N/A
GamesRadar+	2/5	2/5
GameZone	6/10	8.4/10
IGN	8/10	8/10
Nintendo Life	N/A	8/10
Nintendo Power	N/A	8.5/10
Nintendo World Report	N/A	8/10
PlayStation: The Official Magazine	2/5	N/A
Wired	N/A	9/10

The game received "mixed or average reviews" on both platforms according to the review aggregation website Metacritic. In Japan, Famitsu gave the PlayStation 2 version a score of three sevens and one five for a total of 26 out of 40.

The Wii version was nominated for Best Wii RPG by IGN in its 2008 video game awards.
