= Aedis Eclipse: Generation of Chaos =

2006 video game

- North American box art
- Developer: Idea Factory
- Publishers: Idea Factory; NIS America; Ghostlight
- Platform: PlayStation Portable
- Release: JP: May 25, 2006; NA: April 24, 2007; EU: March 30, 2011
- Genres: Turn-based strategy, Real-time tactics
- Modes: Single player Multiplayer

Aedis Eclipse: Generation of Chaos (Note: Known in Japan and South Korea as Aedis Memories: New Demon World GOCV (Japanese: イーディス メモリーズ 〜新天魔界(しんてんまかい) GOCV〜, Hepburn: Īdisu Memorīzu 〜Shin Tenmakai GOCV〜)) is a turn-based strategy fantasy video game released for the PlayStation Portable. It was developed by Idea Factory and published by Nippon Ichi Software. The game was released in Japan on May 25, 2006, in North America on April 24, 2007 and in Europe on March 30, 2011. It is the sequel to Generation of Chaos.

== Gameplay ==
As a sequel, the game features a different setting, new characters, and a refined battle system. As with the original Generation of Chaos, this follow-up combines strategic, turn-based planning with automatic, real-time battles. Players will move one of 40 commanders across three distinct worlds as they attempt to eliminate rivals from the playing field. Movement throughout each world is designed like a board game, with factions alternating turns and moving a fixed number of spaces to capture key buildings or to directly confront an enemy character.

Each commander under a player's control leads a distinct army, from wizards and demons to gladiators and insects, with certain unit types more advantageous against a rival's units than others. Once two factions share the same space on the board, a real-time battle ensues, with both armies fighting each other until all opposing units are defeated. Variables influencing each battle include formation type, terrain, weather, time of day, and more. While players cannot control troops directly, they can influence a battle's outcome by activating their commander's special abilities at pivotal moments.

The game has a combination of team customization and item crafting, with a dynamic combat multi-unit battle system.

== Reception ==
Reception

Aggregate score
Aggregator	Score
Metacritic	62 out of 100

Review scores
Publication	Score
Game Informer	6 out of 10
GamePro	3.25 out of 5
GameSpot	6.1 out of 10
GameSpy	2 out of 5
GameZone	7 out of 10
Hardcore Gamer	2.75 out of 5
IGN	6.9 out of 10
PlayStation: The Official Magazine	6.5 out of 10
RPGamer	3 out of 5
X-Play	2 out of 5

The game received "mixed" reviews according to the review aggregation website Metacritic.

GameSpot stated that, "The sequel to Generation of Chaos provides more of the same strategic gameplay without doing anything to correct the problems with the original." IGN noted that, "While it's still an extraordinarily deep title on the PSP, the menu and battle systems are still extremely clunky and weakly implemented, and the lack of helpful information will easily start to fray the nerves of even the hardest strategy RPG fan." GamePro called the game "A solid RPG experience that is muddled by some unfortunate pathfinding and UI issues." In contrast, GameSpy commented, "Aedis Eclipse: Generations of Chaos shows a lot of potential, but [is] buried so deep that it's just about not worth digging for."

== See also ==
- Generation of Chaos
- Generation of Chaos: Pandora’s Reflection
