= Solid Runner =

1997 video game

- Japanese Super Famicom box art
- Developer(s): Sting Entertainment
- Publisher(s): ASCII Corporation
- Composer(s): Mitsuhito Tanaka; Toshiaki Sakoda; Pure Sound
- Platform(s): Super Famicom
- Release: JP: March 28, 1997
- Genre(s): Role-playing video game
- Mode(s): Single-player

Solid Runner (ソリッドランナー) is a 1997 role-playing video game developed by Sting Entertainment and published by ASCII Corporation for the Super Famicom.

== Gameplay ==
Talking to NPCs.

Criminals are fought in random encounters in various sections of the city. Healing items are used to fix the attack robot and can be bought at a special warehouse. The player must go to the correct district for crime fighting action. Unauthorized districts cannot be accessed. The combat is handled from a third-person perspective where the player must select commands (using buttons and not a menu screen) in turn-based combat in an attempt to defeat the enemy's mech.

All dialogue in the game is in Japanese. The game takes place in a top-down perspective for the overworld. From there, the player can talk to NPCs and explore.

== Plot ==
Shuu is a detective in Metal City. He is engaged to the daughter of the Shadow Dragon organization's leader, Eileen. Despite his job, he still has to pinch pennies to keep his combat mech in working condition. His partner is Ion, who eventually becomes something of a love interest.

The game takes place in a town known as Solid City, which despite being technologically advanced, is overrun with crime. Very few people dare to challenge the control of the underground mafias and street gangs that threaten the city. While the game has a continuous plot, players are urged to complete individual missions.

== Release ==
The game was released exclusively in Japan on March 28, 1997, late in the console's life span.
