= Dokapon: Monster Hunter =

2001 video game

- European front cover.
- Developer: Asmik Ace Entertainment
- Publishers: JP: Asmik Ace Entertainment; NA: AIA; EU: Ubi Soft
- Series: Dokapon
- Platform: Game Boy Advance
- Release: JP: August 3, 2001; NA: October 30, 2001; EU: June 21, 2002
- Genre: Action role-playing video game
- Modes: Single-player, Multiplayer

Dokapon: Monster Hunter, known in Japan as Dokapon-Q: Monster Hunter! (ドカポンQ モンスターハンター!, Dokapon Q Monsutā Hantā!) and known in Europe as Dokapon: Monster Hunter!, is a 2001 role-playing video game video game developed and published by Asmik Ace Entertainment for the Game Boy Advance in Japan on August 3, 2001. It was later published in North America by AIA on October 30, 2001, and in Europe by Ubi Soft on June 21, 2002.

== Gameplay ==
Dokapon takes place on Dokkano Island, in the town of Poponga. The goal of the game is to become a licensed adventurer - to do this, the player must pass an adventurer's exam by completing a number of assigned missions, which requires the player to defeat many monsters in battle. Once weakened, the player can collect the monster and use it in future battles to defeat opponents, as with other games such as Pokémon.

Dungeons are randomly generated each time the player enters them. Staircases allow the player to move between floors in the dungeons. Within the dungeons are scattered items, weapons, and shields which may be used or sold once the dungeon is completed. Aside from the treasures are monsters. Some will chase you, some will wander freely, some run from you.

=== Battle ===
If the player encounters a monster, a battle begins. The battle starts off with the choice of one card. Two cards are face down; one contains a sword while the other contains a shield. The sword card is the attack card and whoever gets that card will attack first. The shield card determines who will defend first. The battle will then start. The battle commands are based on a rock-paper-scissors game and include a sword or shield according to what turn you have. The sword icon is a normal attack using the weapon you currently have. If the character is unarmed, this is the only command available. This does a set amount of damage based on the character's attack and the opponents defense. Attacks can be evaded depending on the speed stat.

==== Attack ====
The sword icon is the main attack. This deals out a set amount of damage. The damage can only be lowered if the opponent uses the shield command. But the attack can still deal a good amount of damage. The rock, scissors, and paper commands will contain other moves which you may use. If you win, you will use that move. If you lose, your move is canceled and the opponent uses their defensive move. Strategy is key when using the commands as you may have a big disadvantage.

==== Defense ====
The shield icon is the main defense. You will be dealt all damage if the enemy uses a rock, scissors, or paper based move. You'll take less damage if they use the sword icon but many times the monster won't. The rock, scissors, and paper commands are different and have many different effects. Some reflect the attack or back with full effect or a lower effect, some give your character higher stats or decrease the monsters stats, some don't do anything at all.

== Reception ==
Reception

Aggregate score
Aggregator	Score
Metacritic	70/100

Review scores
Publication	Score
AllGame	2.5/5
Famitsu	25/40
Game Informer	7/10
GamesMaster	46%
GameZone	8.5/10
IGN	7.5/10
Jeuxvideo.com	15/20
Nintendo Power	3.5/5

The game received "average" reviews according to the review aggregation website Metacritic. In Japan, Famitsu gave it a score of 25 out of 40.
