= Dokapon MillenniumQuest =

2000 video game

Dokapon?! Millennium Quest
- Developer: Asmik Ace Entertainment
- Publisher: Asmik Ace Entertainment
- Platform: Game Boy Color
- Release: JP: July 14, 2000
- Genre: Role-playing
- Modes: Single-player, multiplayer

Dokapon?! Millennium Quest (ドカポン?! ミレニアム クエスト) is a 2000 role-playing game developed and published by Asmik Ace Entertainment in Japan on July 14, 2000.

== See also ==
- Mine Yoshizaki
