= Sting (company) =

Japanese video game developer

Sting Co, Ltd.
- Native name: 株式会社スティング
- Romanized name: Kabushiki-gaisha Suteingu
- Type: Private company
- Industry: Video games
- Founded: February 7, 1989
- Founder: Takeshi Santo
- Headquarters: Iwamotochō, Chiyoda, Tokyo
- Key people: Takeshi Santo (representative director)
- Products: Dept. Heaven series
- Number of employees: 31
- Website: sting.co.jp

Sting Co, Ltd. (株式会社スティング, Kabushiki-gaisha Suteingu) is a Japanese video game developer based in Tokyo. Founded in 1989, some of their titles include Treasure Hunter G, Evolution: The World of Sacred Device, and the Dept. Heaven series of games. Its active properties currently include Baroque, Dokapon, and the Dept. Heaven series.

== History ==
Sting was founded on February 7, 1989 by former Compile composer Takeshi Santo. The studio focuses on experimental game design, combining role-playing video games with elements from other genres.

On March 10, 2009, Atlus and Sting announced a partnership where Sting games would be published by Atlus in Japan. Atlus also expressed an interest in having Sting develop installments in its own series.

Sting also undertakes contract development work for console releases of Aquaplus titles (such as the Dungeon Travelers and Utawarerumono series).

In March 2012, Sting and Idea Factory formed a development partnership, creating a joint label known as Super Sting for titles developed under this partnership. Their first title, Generation of Chaos: Pandora’s Reflection, was released three months later, in July 2012.

== Works ==
Sting has developed many games, both original creations and contract work, across many platforms. They also regularly port and remake games for new platforms.

Year	Title	System	Developer(s)	Publisher(s)	Ref.
1990	Psycho Chaser	PC Engine	Sting	Naxat Soft	
1990	Naxat Stadium	PC Engine	Sting	Naxat Soft	
1991	Override	PC Engine, X68000	Sting	Data East, Sting	
1991	Extra Innings •Hakunetsu Pro Yakyū: Ganba League^{JP}	Super NES	Sting	Sony Music Entertainment Japan, Sony Imagesoft	
1992	Hakunetsu Professional Baseball: Ganba League '93	Super Famicom	Sting	Sony Music Entertainment Japan	
1992	TKO Super Championship Boxing •Kentou-Ou World Champion^{JP}	Super NES	Sting	SOFEL	
1992	Truxton	PC Engine	Sting	Taito	
1992	Flying Hero: Bugyuru no Daibouken	Super Famicom	Sting	SOFEL	
1992	Daibakushou Jinsei Gekijou	Super Famicom	Sting	Taito	
1993	Onizuka Katsuya Super Virtual Boxing	Super Famicom	Sting	Tokuma Shoten	
1993	Yadamon: Wonderland Dream	Super Famicom	Sting	Tokuma Shoten	
1994	Melfand Stories	Super Famicom	Sting	ASCII Entertainment	
1994	The Jetsons: Invasion of the Planet Pirates •Youkai Buster: Ruka no Daibouken^{JP}	Super NES	Sting	Taito, Kadokawa Shoten	
1996	Treasure Hunter G	Super Famicom	Sting	Square	
1997	Solid Runner	Super Famicom	Sting	ASCII Entertainment	
1998	Slamtilt	Microsoft Windows	Sting	21st Century Entertainment	
1998	Baroque	Sega Saturn, PlayStation, PlayStation 2, PlayStation Network, Wii	Sting	Sting, Atlus USA, Rising Star Games	
1999	Evolution: The World of Sacred Device	Dreamcast	Sting	ESP Software, Ubisoft	
1999	Evolution 2: Far Off Promise	Dreamcast	Sting	ESP Software, Ubisoft	
2000	Baroque Shooting	Microsoft Windows	Sting	Sting	
2000	Baroque Syndrome	Microsoft Windows	Sting	Sting	
2001	Haruka Typing	Microsoft Windows	Sting	Sting	
2001	Wizardry Scenario 1: Proving Grounds of the Mad Overlord	WonderSwan Color	Sting	Sting, Sir-Tech	
2001	Koguru Guruguru: Guruguru to Nakayoshi	Game Boy Color	Sting	Sting	
2002	Baroque Typing	Microsoft Windows	Sting	Sting	
2002	Evolution Worlds	GameCube	Sting	ESP Software, Ubisoft	
2002	Riviera: The Promised Land	WonderSwan Color, Game Boy Advance, PlayStation Portable, Nintendo Switch, Android, iOS, Steam	Sting	Sting, Atlus USA, 505 Games, Bandai	
2006	Yggdra Union: We'll Never Fight Alone	Game Boy Advance, PlayStation Portable, Android, iOS, Nintendo Switch, Steam	Sting	Sting, Atlus USA, 505 Games	
2006	IGPX: Immortal Grand Prix	PlayStation 2	Sting	Namco Bandai Games	
2006	Utawarerumono	PlayStation 2, PlayStation Portable, PlayStation 4, PlayStation Vita	Sting	Aquaplus, NIS America	
2007	Dokapon Kingdom	PlayStation 2, Wii, Nintendo Switch, Steam	Sting	Examu, Atlus USA, BigBen Interactive, Nintendo Switch	
2007	Yggdra Unison	Cellphone, Nintendo DS	Sting	Sting, Atlus	
2008	Dokapon Journey	Nintendo DS	Suzak Inc.	Sting, Ubisoft	
2008	Knights in the Nightmare	Nintendo DS, PlayStation Portable, Nintendo Switch, Android, iOS	Sting	Sting	
2009	Hexyz Force	PlayStation Portable	Sting	Atlus	
2010	Blaze Union: Story to Reach the Future	PlayStation Portable, Nintendo Switch, Android, iOS	Sting	Atlus, Sting	
2011	To Heart 2: Dungeon Travelers	PlayStation Portable, PlayStation Vita, Steam	Sting	Aquaplus	
2011	Gungnir: Inferno of the Demon Lance and the War of Heroes	PlayStation Portable	Sting	Atlus	
2011	Gloria Union	PlayStation Portable, Nintendo Switch, Android, iOS	Sting	Atlus, Sting	
2011	Dragon Labyrinth	Android	Sting	Sting	
2011	Baroque FPS	iOS	Sting	Sting	
2012	Generation of Chaos: Pandora's Reflection	PlayStation Portable	Sting	Idea Factory, NIS America	
2013	Dungeon Travelers 2	PlayStation Portable, PlayStation Vita, Microsoft Windows	Sting	Aquaplus, Atlus, NIS America	
2014	Hyperdevotion Noire: Goddess Black Heart	PlayStation Vita, Steam, Nintendo Switch	Compile Heart, Sting	Idea Factory International, Compile Heart	
2015	Utawarerumono: Mask of Deception	PlayStation 3 & 4, PlayStation Vita	Aquaplus, Sting	Aquaplus, Atlus, Deep Silver	
2016	Utawarerumono: Mask of Truth	PlayStation 3 & 4, PlayStation Vita	Aquaplus, Sting	Aquaplus, Atlus, Deep Silver	
2017	Dungeon Travelers 2-2	PlayStation Vita, Microsoft Windows	Sting	Aquaplus	
2020	Dokapon UP! Roulette of Dreams	Nintendo Switch, PlayStation 4	Sting	Aquaplus	
2020	Fantasia Re:build	Android, iOS	Sting	Kadokawa Games	
2022	Fairy Fencer F: Refrain Chord	Nintendo Switch, PlayStation 4 & 5, Steam	Compile Heart, Idea Factory, Sting	Idea Factory International	
2023	Dokapon Kingdom: Connect	Nintendo Switch, Steam	Sting	Compile Heart, Idea Factory International	
2024	Touhou Spell Carnival	Nintendo Switch, PlayStation 4 & 5, Steam	Compile Heart, Idea Factory, Sting	Idea Factory International	
2024	Mado Monogatari: Fia and the Wondrous Academy	Nintendo Switch, PlayStation 4 & 5, Steam	Compile Heart, Idea Factory, Sting	Idea Factory International	
2025	Baroque-Ya	Nintendo Switch	Sting	Sting	
2025	Viractal: Will You Trust Your Party?	Steam, Nintendo Switch 1 & 2	Sting	Sting	
2026	Dokapon 3-2-1 Super Collection!	Nintendo Switch, Steam	Sting	Sting	
