= Mercenaries Saga Chronicles =

2018 video game

- North American box art
- Developer: Rideon
- Publishers: Digital: WW: Circle Entertainment; Physical: NA: PM Studios
- Platform: Nintendo Switch
- Release: JP: January 18, 2018; WW: February 8, 2018
- Genre: Tactical role-playing game
- Mode: Single-player

Mercenaries Saga Chronicles is a tactical role-playing game released for the Nintendo Switch. The game is a collection of three previous Mercenaries Saga games - Mercenaries Saga: Will of the White Lions, Mercenaries Saga 2: Order of the Silver Eagle and Mercenaries Saga 3: Gray Wolves of War.

== Gameplay ==
Mercenaries Saga Chronicles consists of a collection of the three entries in the Mercenary Saga games; Mercenaries Saga: Will of the White Lions, Mercenaries Saga 2: Order of the Silver Eagle and Mercenaries Saga 3: Gray Wolves of War. All three titles play as tactical role-playing games games, playing similarly to the Final Fantasy Tactics and Tactics Ogre series of games. The player directs a team of characters across a grid to battle a computer-controlled opponent team in turn based combat. In a character's turn, the player makes decisions in regards to moving a character on the grid within their movement range, and potentially attacking opponents if any are within the attack range. Damage is affected based on characters' proximity to one another and the overall map of the grid. Effectiveness of attacks are determined by a character's attack power against the other character's defense, all of which are altered based on character's base stats, and alteration of said stats based on equipping items and changing classes of characters in the game's menus prior to starting battles. Successful attacks earn experience points and skill points, which in turn help characters level up and strengthen their stats, while "mana points", which are slowly accrued over the course of battle, are used in order to use more powerful attacks mid-battle. If a character loses all of their health through being attacked, they faint, and after 5 rounds of turns, they are removed from the specific battle and unable until the next battle. The game is won if the player makes the entire team fainted or removed from battle, and loses if the same happens to them.

The three titles combined contain 82 specific story-based battles, along with more optional battles as well.

== Story ==
All three games revolve around the same basic premise: The game follows a group of mercenaries that start out with just taking random odd jobs, but eventually lead the group into various political and social drama over the course of their travels, while people increasingly join the group as the story progresses. The first title follows Leon, the leader of the "White Lions" mercenary group, who in their mercenary work, get wrapped up in an on-going war. The second title follows Claude, the leader of the "Silver Eagle" mercenaries, who end up searching for the antidote for a prince poisoned by an assassin. The third title follows Marion, the leader of the "Gray Wolves" mercenaries, who fights for the Kingdom against an uprising from the opposing Liberation Army.

== Development and release ==
The game was first announced on January 2, 2018, as a collection of the three previous games in the Mercenaries Saga series -Mercenaries Saga: Will of the White Lions, Mercenaries Saga 2: Order of the Silver Eagle and Mercenaries Saga 3: Gray Wolves of War. The game was developed by Rideon Japan, the original developer of all three entries, and prior to them, had previously developed the Adventure Bar Story mobile phone game. The game marks the first time that all three games were made playable in English on one platform; the first Mercenaries Saga was only released on mobile phones in Japan, while the second and third titles were released on mobile phone and Nintendo 3DS in both Japanese and English. Chronicles was released on January 18 in Japan, and on February 8 in North America and Europe. The three games are largely the same as they were in their individual releases, but do feature some minor changes to the first two entries in the series to make them consistent with the setup of the third entry.

== Reception ==
Reception

Aggregate score
Aggregator	Score
Metacritic	68/100

Review scores
Publication	Score
Computer Games Magazine	7/10
Nintendo Life	7/10
Nintendo World Report	7/10

Reception for the game was generally positive; reviewers generally praised the game's core gameplay for being a good, if not simplified, recreation of the Final Fantasy Tactics and Tactics Ogre games core gameplay, and for the collection containing a lot of content in compiling three titles in one release. Conversely, multiple reviewers criticized the weak story and overall generic presentation and graphics.

== Sequels ==
Further entries in the series include Mercenaries Wings: The False Phoenix, Mercenaries Blaze: Dawn of the Twin Dragons, Mercenaries Rebirth: Call of the Wild Lynx, and Mercenaries Lament: Requiem of the Silver Wolf.
