= Warhammer 40,000: Deathwatch =

2015 video game

- App icon
- Developer: Rodeo Games
- Publisher: Rodeo Games
- Series: Warhammer 40,000
- Engine: Unreal Engine 4
- Platforms: iOS, Windows, PlayStation 4
- Release: July 16, 2015 (iOS); October 16, 2015 (Windows): EU: February 24, 2017 (PS4)
- Genre: Turn-based tactics
- Modes: Single-player, multiplayer

Warhammer 40,000: Deathwatch – Tyranid Invasion is a turn-based tactics video game developed and published by Rodeo Games. Initially released for iOS on July 16, 2015, ports for Windows and PlayStation 4 were released as Warhammer 40,000: Deathwatch – Enhanced Edition. It is based on Games Workshop's tabletop wargame Warhammer 40,000. The game has been described as a spiritual successor to Hunters series.

== Gameplay ==
Warhammer 40,000: Deathwatch is a 3D turn-based squad-scale tactics game, with combat playing out on a square grid. The player controls a squad of Space marines from the Deathwatch, tasked with fighting alien creatures called Tyranids. Different actions (e.g. movement, shooting, overwatch) cost action points (AP) that replenish after each turn. Competitive four-player multiplayer was added to the iOS version in an update. It supports multiplayer in play-by-mail format. The Enhanced Edition has remastered graphics and redesigned user interface.

== Release ==
Deathwatch was developed by Rodeo Games, a studio based in Guildford, England. Deathwatch was announced on March 18, 2015, for iOS, and released on July 16, 2015. A PC version was announced on September 18, 2015, and released on October 16, 2015. After the release of iOS and PC versions, Rodeo Games announced that the staff were made redundant and no new games will be developed because of the poor sales of Deathwatch. On January 27, 2017, a PlayStation 4 version was announced for release in Europe on February 24, 2017.

== Reception ==
Reception

Aggregate score
Aggregator	Score
Metacritic	87/100 (iOS); 74/100 (PC)

Review scores
Publication	Score
Eurogamer	9/10 (iOS, Italy); Avoid (PS4, Spain)
IGN	7.5/10 (PC)
Pocket Gamer	4/5
TouchArcade	4.5/5
Hardcore Gamer	3.5/5 (PC)
Multiplayer.it	6.5/10 (PC)
Pocket Tactics	5/5

According to the review aggregate website Metacritic, the iOS version of Deathwatch received "generally favorable reviews", while the PC version received "mixed or average reviews".

Harry Slater of Pocket Gamer said: "Deathwatch is probably the best of the recent slew of mobile games based on Games Workshop licences. It catches more of the spirit of Space Hulk than Space Hulk did, and the tight strategic skirmishes are smart and tactically rich."

Shaun Musgrave of TouchArcade said: "Warhammer 40K: Deathwatch is a gorgeous game with strong design backing it. The campaign is big and meaty, and it presents a fun challenge that will test your tactical skills. If you're looking for innovation, you might not be as impressed with Deathwatch‘s safe, sturdy structure, but I found the game to be a real joy."

Edward Dang of Hardcore Gamer reviewed the PC version and summarized: "While not a complex top-down, turn-based strategy RPG, Warhammer 40,000: Deathwatch – Enhanced Edition does a nice job of laying a solid groundwork from the beginning in tactical options, challenge and character progression. Even if this groundwork never truly changes or improves, it doesn't stop the title from delivering an enjoyable strategy game for the most part."

Jody Macgregor of PC Gamer said that "[f]or a budget version of a Firaxis-style XCOM with space marines, it was decent."
