= Generation of Chaos: Pandora's Reflection =

2012 video game

- Japanese box art
- Developers: Sting; Idea Factory
- Publishers: JP: Idea Factory; NA: NIS America; EU: NIS Europe
- Series: Generation of Chaos
- Platform: PlayStation Portable
- Release: JP: June 28, 2012; NA: February 19, 2013; EU: February 20, 2013
- Genre: Tactical role-playing
- Mode: Single-player

Generation of Chaos: Pandora’s Reflection (Note: Known in Japan as Generation of Chaos 6 (Japanese: ジェネレーション オブ カオス6, Hepburn: Jenerēshon obu Kaosu Shikkusu)) is a strategy role-playing video game for the PlayStation Portable. The game was released in Japan on June 28, 2012, and an English language release for North America and Europe was released on February 19 and 20, 2013, in North America and Europe respectively.

== Gameplay ==
The game plays very differently from past games in the Generation of Chaos series, which contained large scale battles in the vein of Dragon Force. Instead, the game's controls and art style resembles former titles of developer Sting Entertainment, namely Yggdra Union and Knights in the Nightmare. The player controls a small number of characters, which move in real time on a battlefield to occupy strategic locations. When they encounter an enemy character en route, a battle will occur.

The game has a battle system called the "Attack Chance", where bonus damage could be given upon hitting buttons in time with on-screen cues, similar to games in the music/rhythm genre. Good timing with the button presses also allows party members in vicinity initiating additional "team attacks". The battle system also employs a rock paper scissors type weapon system, and the ability to summon powerful creatures to help with their magic abilities.

The game spans seven chapters and over thirty battles.

== Plot ==
The game takes place in the dark, barren world of Hades, revolving around a boy named Claude, and his sister named Yuri. In the game, Yuri is cursed with a butterfly tattoo, leading Claude to vow to travel the world in order to find a way to break the curse. Along their travels, they also become entangled in a larger struggle that could decide the fate of the entire world.

== Development ==
The game was first revealed by Dengeki PlayStation, in March 2012. The game was announced as a joint venture between Idea Factory, the company that had made the previous games in the Generation of Chaos series, and Sting, developer of games such as Riviera: The Promised Land, Knights in the Nightmare, and Gungnir. The collaboration would be named "Super Sting".

The game was released on June 28, 2012, in Japan, and in September 2012, NIS America announced the English localization of the game for North American and European regions. It was released in February 2013.

== Reception ==
Reception

Aggregate score
Aggregator	Score
Metacritic	70/100

Review score
Publication	Score
Famitsu	32/40

The game received "mixed or average" reviews according to the review aggregation website Metacritic. Famitsu gave the game an 8, 8, 8, 8 (32/40) review score.

== See also ==
- Aedis Eclipse: Generation of Chaos
- Generation of Chaos
