= Dokapon Journey =

2008 video game

- North American version cover art
- Developer: Suzak Inc.
- Publishers: JP: Sting Entertainment; NA: Atlus
- Platform: Nintendo DS
- Release: JP: July 31, 2008; NA: April 14, 2009
- Genre: Party video game
- Modes: Single-player, multiplayer

Dokapon Journey, known in Japan as Dokapon Journey! Nakayoku Kenka Shite♪, (Note: Japanese: ドカポンジャーニー! 〜なかよくケンカしてっ♪〜, Hepburn: Dokapon Jānī! 〜Nakayoku Kenka Shite♪〜) is a 2008 RPG board game developed by Suzak Inc. and published by Sting Entertainment in Japan for the Nintendo DS on July 31, 2008. It was later published by Atlus in North America on April 14, 2009.

== Development and release ==
Dokapon Journey was published by Sting.

The game was released on 26 June 2008 in Japan. On 2 February 2009, Atlus USA announced it would publish the game for North America. It was released on 14 April 2009.

== Reception ==
Reception

Aggregate score
Aggregator	Score
Metacritic	60/100

Review scores
Publication	Score
Famitsu	27/40
GameSpot	7/10
GamesRadar+	2/5
GameZone	8.7/10
IGN	6.5/10
Nintendo Power	4/10
Nintendo World Report	7/10
RPGFan	79/100

The game received "mixed or average" reviews according to the review aggregation website Metacritic. In Japan, Famitsu gave it a score of 27 out of 40.
