= Treasure Hunter G =

1996 video game

- Developer: Sting
- Publisher: Square
- Director: Kazunari Yonemitsu
- Producer: Shinji Hashimoto
- Composers: Mitsuhito Tanaka; Hitoshi Sakimoto; Masaharu Iwata; Toshiaki Sakoda; Yoko Takada; Tomoko Matsui; Akiko Goto
- Platform: Super Famicom
- Release: JP: May 24, 1996
- Genre: Tactical role-playing
- Mode: Single-player

Treasure Hunter G (Note: Japanese: トレジャーハンターG, Hepburn: Torejā Hantā Jī) is a 1996 turn-based tactical role-playing game developed by Sting Entertainment and published by Square exclusively for the Super Famicom, and in Japan.

== Gameplay ==
Treasure Hunter G is a strategy role playing game, with combat similar to the Shining Force series.

The game has two types of gameplay (adventuring and combat). Adventuring is done in a fashion similar to Squaresoft's Super Famicom games such as Chrono Trigger and Trials of Mana, with the group exploring various locations typical to the genre such as towns, forests, dungeons, castles and a few more fantastical locations. They make new allies and enemies and embark on a quest to stop the Dark Lord's plan of reviving Bone Dino and destroying the world. Combat takes place on a grid, with movement and fighting consuming varying amounts of Action Points. Other actions include using items, spells, special attacks and traps. Action Points increase during the game allowing for greater freedom in strategy.

== Plot ==
There is a villain called the Dark King. He was sealed away until an unsuspecting treasure hunter releases him by attempting to get the "treasure". Now Red, Blue, Rain, and Ponga have to stop him.

== Development ==
Hitoshi Sakimoto and Masaharu Iwata were two of the composers for the game.

The score for Treasure Hunter G was created by the seven composers that make up the Sting Symphony: Hitoshi Sakimoto, Mitsuhito Tanaka aka John Pee, Masaharu Iwata, Toshiaki Sakoda, Yoko Takada, Tomoko Matsui, and Akiko Goto.

The character sprites are pre-rendered from 3D models, rather than drawn by hand, akin to Super Mario RPG and Donkey Kong Country. This allowed for a feature used with similar 2D games of the era: character sprites can be quickly and easily created for eight directions instead of the usual four.

It was released on May 24, 1996 in Japan for the Super Famicom and published by Square. It was the last game Square published for the Super Famicom. The 86-song soundtrack was published by NTT Publishing on June 9, 1996.

It was released on the Wii Virtual Console in Japan on December 25, 2007.

== Reception ==
Reception

Review scores
Publication	Score
Famitsu	31/40
GameFan	94, 89, 92
Super GamePower	4/5
Consoles+	92%
Mega Console	85/100

Upon release, four reviewers for Famitsu gave the game a score of 31 out of 40. GameFan gave it scores of 89, 94, and 92.

In 2011, 1up.com listed this game on its "Six Must-Play Super Nintendo Imports" list. The writer called the pre-rendered graphics "garish", and compared the story to Chrono Trigger, and the combat to Shining Force.
