= The War of Eustrath =

2010 video game

- Developer: iQubi Inc.
- Publisher: iQubi Inc.
- Platform: iOS
- Release: June 4, 2010
- Genre: Turn-based tactical RPG
- Mode: Single-player

The War of Eustrath is a turn-based tactical role-playing game developed and published by South Korean studio iQubi Inc. and released on June 4, 2010 for iOS, with an HD version being released on January 30, 2011.

It received mostly positive reception from critics, who praised its gameplay and story while criticizing its poor localization.

== Gameplay ==
Members of the player's team control giant mechs known as GEARs that can be leveled up and upgraded over the course of the game. Each GEAR is elementally aligned, which bestows upon them certain special abilities. The game's battles take place on an overhead grid, and are turn-based. Terrain also plays a role, with different types of terrain having different effects.

The GEAR pilots also have a "will" stat that determines their power and can rise and fall depending on whether the actions they make align with their personalities.

The game has over 50 campaign missions, some able to have multiple results depending on what the player does.

== Plot ==
The game takes place in a science fantasy setting, where two warring nations, Wefradian and Kradion, have gone to war over food shortages. The main character is Luke Bradferd, a Wefradian knight who pilots a giant robot called a GEAR. His GEAR becomes damaged and he is forced to stop in a small village, but it gets destroyed by enemy forces, and its inhabitants are kidnapped. He rescues a young woman named Tiana, and flees the town, meeting up with the rest of his military unit.

In the course of the game, Luke and his unit discover an evil conspiracy behind the war and end up having to save the world.

== Reception ==
The game's HD version received positive reception from critics, with an aggregate score of 83/100 on Metacritic.

Bryan Grosnick of RPGFan rated the original version of the game 82/100, calling the story clichéd and poorly localized but that it was still one of the best SRPGs on the iPhone and an "excellent value".

Jared Nelson of TouchArcade rated the HD version 80/100, calling the battles "excellent" and the story "compelling".

Will Wilson of Pocket Gamer rated the HD version 6/10, calling the game "tedious" and "plodding" despite its "interesting battle mechanics".

== Origin ==
The game is an enhanced remake of the game Battle of the Youstrass from 2001 created by Team Darkland. iQubi was founded by former members of Team Darkland, who wished to make another attempt at the game after Battle of the Youstrass sold poorly.

As of June 2021, The War of Eustrath is no longer available in the Apple App Store.
