= Generation of Chaos =

2005 video game

- Developers: Idea Factory; HyperDevbox Japan (Android)
- Publishers: NIS America; Midas Interactive Entertainment; HyperDevbox Japan (Android)
- Platforms: PlayStation Portable, Android OS
- Release: PSP: JP: March 31, 2005; NA: February 28, 2006; EU: September 14, 2007; AU: September 27, 2007; Android; December 15, 2011
- Genres: Tactical role-playing game, Turn-based strategy, Real-time tactics
- Mode: Single-player

Generation of Chaos (Note: Known in Japan as New Demon World: GOCIV Another Side (Japanese: 新天魔界(しんてんまかい) ～ＧＯＣIV アナザサイド～, Hepburn: Shin Tenmakai ~GOCIV Anaza Saido~)) is a turn-based strategy RPG fantasy video game released for the PlayStation Portable, developed by Idea Factory and published in the U.S. by NIS America. NIS America released the game in the U.S. on February 28, 2006. An Android port of the title, developed by HyperDevbox Japan, was released on December 15, 2011.

The game is a PSP port of the fourth game in a series of Generation of Chaos games, the fifth one having already been released in July 2005 in Japan for the PlayStation 2. Generation of Chaos is also part of a label called Neverland, which includes other Idea Factory games such as Spectral Souls.

== Plot ==
The Lost Grounds erupt into war as kingdom fights kingdom in their search for peace and the secrets of the Dragon King. Intrigues, betrayals, and dramatic confrontations ensue as each kingdom walks the path of war towards what may eventually become world conquest.

== Gameplay ==
Generation of Chaos is a game revolving around the management of a kingdom, expanding not only through military prowess, but also improving the inner workings of the player's kingdom. The game moves between two modes: kingdom management and army battles.

=== Kingdom management ===
Kingdom management is viewed from an isometric perspective on a tile-based playing area and allows players to view their kingdom's holdings and the rest of the world, allowing players to track the progress of their enemies. Players can move five units per turn, improve their fortifications and market status of their towns and castles, change surrounding terrain or recruit officers, among other actions.

If players do not position their commanders well, a disaster can strike. For example, if an important commander goes to battle and loses, the game is over. Also, earthquakes can cause calamity within the kingdom, as earthquakes destroy walls and markets, lowering funds and increasing debt.

=== Army battles ===
Each unit has a unit type, with certain unit types being either more powerful or much weaker when faced off against certain other types. When two units meet on the map, they engage in a real-time army battle. The perspective is again isometric, with each side usually having a unit commander and 29 soldiers.

The player begins the battle with a certain kind of formation selectable from a list, each one having advantages and disadvantages not only in positioning, but also in stats such as speed. When the battle begins, players can issue commands to their troops such as attacking the enemy, waiting for the enemy army to come to them, or targeting the enemy commander. However, directing an individual within the unit is not possible.

The commander of a unit can make use of skills, which when used often provide healing for one's troops or area of effect attacks against the opposition. Skills use up a unit commander's SP.

In addition to skills, the commander can also use supers. To use supers, the commander's army usually must take damage or directly deal damage with their commander, charging up their super bar, filling it and storing up to three supers. When the player has the opportunity to perform a super, doing so will prompt an attack animation that encompasses the whole screen. Supers have similar functions to skills. Certain important characters actually have cut scenes during their supers, complete with voice acting.

The commander may also bring an item, usually taken from chests in battle or bought from shops. These items' functions range from healing the commander and accompanying troops to lowering the morale of the enemy.

== Setting ==
Generation of Chaos takes place in a part of the world known as the Lost Grounds. There are two main initial campaigns, Dravania and Zodia, each with a different character.

=== Characters ===
- Gena Rose - A captain of the Dravanian army. She is the main character of the Dravania campaign.
- Glen - Gena's best friend since the academy.
- Bado - A baby phoenix that is Gena's companion.
- Valz - Former captain of the Dravanian army, now the leader of the Liberation Army.
- Allen - The leader of the Kingdom of Zodia. He is the main character of the Zodia campaign.
- Lu Lu La La - The leader of the Kingdom of Nightmare.
- Geo - The Leader of the Beasts Arcane.
- Viscious - The Leader of the Lizardmen. Main leader of the Rudora Beastman Union
- Cairo - The leader of the Catpeople. Co-ruler of the Rudora Beastman Union
- Fiaz - The leader of the Winged Cavalry. Hates Humans
- Shiek - Sister of Fiaz and second in command of the Winged Cavalry
- Zankou - Leader of the Moonlight Militia. An experienced ninja and dancer
- Yoshitsuna - Second in command of the Moonlight Militia. Samurai and ardent admirer of Zankou
- Aria - Leader of Aquamight. A mermaid queen
- Frost - Leader of the Principality of Elves. Older of the two princes.
- Lozenge - Second in command in the Principality of Elves. Brother of Frost.
- Nemo - An independent journalist hired to break up a death cult in Neverland
- Patton - Nemo's turtle obsessed junior assistant.

=== Kingdoms ===
- Dravanian Empire:

The Dravanian Empire is located in the cold northern plains of the mainland. Led by Zeo, this Empire has just been reborn. It now seeks to conquer the Lost Grounds.

- Zodia:

This country's leader is Allen the 3rd, sometimes called Allen of Zodia. The Kingdom of Zodia is located on an archipelago just off the western coast of the mainland. Well protected against attack, the Kingdom is one of the strongest countries in the Lost Grounds.

- Rudora Beastman Union:

Located in the deserts in the southeast of the mainland, the Rudora Beastman Union is composed of Cats and Lizards. Once bitter enemies, they have since banded together to destroy the Human threat. They are led by the lizardman, Vicious.

- Beasts Arcane:

Mysterious beasts from a system of caves beneath the Lost Grounds. Commanded by their Emperor, they left their native lands and entered the world above to conquer all who stand before them. They are led by the black wolf Geo. Their Base of Operations is located in the plains just south of the central peninsula.

- Winged Cavalry:

Birdmen who live in the mountains of the southwest. They are led by Fiaz, and though they are anti-war, they have entered into this one to protect their home, and themselves.

- Moonlight Militia:

Ninjas living in the hidden village of Gekou. They are led by Zankou, who seeks to protect her people from the war raging around them. They are located in the forest of the central peninsula.

- Aquamight:

The ocean's to the southwest of the Lost Grounds play host to the Mermaids and Frogs who have formed the country of Aquamight. They are ruled by Aria, who has been Queen for less than a year. The Honor Guard of the country is made up of the Frogs. The Honor Guard is led by Baka, a strong warrior who will stop at nothing to protect his country and his people, even if it means the destruction of all terrestrial life.

- Principality of Elves:

Led by Frost. The Principality of Elves is located in the forests of the southwestern peninsula.

- Liberation Army:

Composed almost entirely of people who have lost loved ones to the war, the Liberation Army is led by Valzoa. Situated in the southern fields of the Lost Grounds, they seek to end the war for the ones they lost.

- Nightmare:

Ruled by Lululala, this is a country of demons who have cast off tradition and now seek to create a new world order. The country of Nightmare is located on a cold island just north of the Zodian Archipelago.

== Opening Theme ==
The theme song of the game is called "Madu Minu Hito". It was sung by Aya Hiroshige, the lyrics were done by Shun Taguchi, and the composition was created by Masataka Matsutoya.

== Reception ==
Reception

Aggregate score
| Aggregator | Score |
|---|---|
| Metacritic | 60/100 |

Review scores
| Publication | Score |
|---|---|
| 1Up.com | 5/10 |
| Edge | 5/10 |
| Famitsu | 26/40 |
| Game Informer | 5/10 |
| GameSpot | 6.6/10 |
| GameSpy | 2.5/5 |
| GameZone | 6.5/10 |
| IGN | 6.7/10 |
| Official U.S. PlayStation Magazine | 2.5/5 |
| X-Play | 2/5 |
| Detroit Free Press | 1/4 |

The game received "mixed" reviews according to the review aggregation website Metacritic. In Japan, Famitsu gave it a score of two sevens and two sixes for a total of 26 out of 40.

== See also ==
- Aedis Eclipse: Generation of Chaos
- Generation of Chaos: Pandora’s Reflection
