= Warhammer Quest (video game series) =

Video game series

- App icon of the first game
- Developers: Rodeo Games (1); Perchang Games (2 & 3)
- Publishers: Rodeo Games (1); Perchang Games (2 & 3); Chilled Mouse (1 & 2, ports)
- Series: Warhammer Fantasy
- Platforms: iOS, Windows, Linux, macOS, Android, PlayStation 4, Xbox One, Nintendo Switch
- Release: Warhammer Quest May 30, 2013: 30 May 2013 (iOS) 7 January 2015 (Windows, Linux, Mac) 26 June 2015 (Android) 21 February 2017 (PS4) 24 February 2017 (Xbox One) 26 February 2019 (Switch); Warhammer Quest 2 October 19, 2017: 19 October 2017 (iOS) 11 April 2018 (Android) 30 January 2019 (Windows, Mac) 20 December 2019 (Xbox One) 23 December 2019 (Switch) 6 January 2020 (PS4); Silver Tower September 3, 2020: 3 September 2020 (Android, iOS) 3 June 2021 (Windows)
- Genre: Tactical role-playing
- Modes: Single-player, multiplayer

Warhammer Quest is a series of three tactical role-playing video games developed and published by Rodeo Games and Perchang Games. The first game, Warhammer Quest, was released in 2013. The second game, Warhammer Quest 2: The End Times, was released in 2017. Warhammer Quest: Silver Tower, was released in 2020. The first two games are based on Games Workshop's 1995 board game Warhammer Quest, which itself is based on the tabletop wargame Warhammer. Silver Tower is based on the 2016 sequel board game of the same name.

== Gameplay ==
Warhammer Quest is a top-down turn-based dungeon crawler. The player controls a party of four warriors in search of treasure in the dungeons of The Old World. The dungeons are randomly generated. The rules are quite close to the original board game and in "hardcore mode" even less forgiving.

Warhammer Quest 2 is set years after the events of the first game during Chaos' final assault on the Old World. Warhammer Quest 2 has full 3D polygonal graphics compared to the 2D top-down graphics of the first game.

In Silver Tower, the party has to find eight fragments of a Chaos Amulet hidden in the titular dungeon and deal with the master of the tower, the Gaunt Summoner, and his minions. Silver Tower is a free-to-play gacha game where the player is enticed to spend money to buy lootboxes and random heroes. A multiplayer mode was added to the game on 15 September 2022.

== Release ==
Warhammer Quest series was developed by Rodeo Games and Perchang Games, studios that are both based in Guildford, England. Warhammer Quest was announced on 21 August 2012, for release in spring 2013. The game was showcased at UK Games Expo 2012. The iOS version was released on 30 May 2013. It uses Taurus game engine, the same engine from Rodeo's previous game, Hunters 2. An expansion, The Brutal Tribe, was released on 3 October 2013. Another expansion, The Undead Horde, was released in December 2013. PC, Linux and Mac versions were announced on 15 December 2014, for release on 7 January 2015. Android version was released on 26 June 2015. PlayStation 4 and Xbox One versions were released in 2017, Nintendo Switch version was released in 2019.

In July 2017, Warhammer Quest 2 was announced to be released in September 2017. The game was released eventually on 19 October 2017. Android version was released on 11 April 2018. The PC and Mac versions were released on 30 January 2019. Xbox One and Nintendo Switch versions were released in 2019, PlayStation 4 version was released in 2020.

Silver Tower was released for Android and iOS on 3 September 2020. It was released for PC on 3 June 2021.

== Reception ==
Warhammer Quest

Aggregate score
| Aggregator | Score |
|---|---|
| Metacritic | 79/100 (iOS); 55/100 (PC, Xbox One) |

Review scores
| Publication | Score |
|---|---|
| 4Players | 38/100 |
| Eurogamer | 6/10 (iOS, UK); 5/10 (PC, UK); 8/10 (iOS, Italy); 6/10 (PC, Italy) |
| Game Informer | 7.75/10 |
| IGN | 7.5/10 |
| PC Games (DE) | 70% |
| Pocket Gamer | 4/5 |
| RPGFan | 70% |
| TouchArcade | 4.5/5 |
| Digital Spy | 4/5 |
| Multiplayer.it | 8.0/10 |
| Pelit | 85/100 |

Warhammer Quest 2: The End Times

Aggregate score
| Aggregator | Score |
|---|---|
| Metacritic | 71/100 (iOS) |

Review scores
| Publication | Score |
|---|---|
| Eurogamer | 8/10 |
| Nintendo Life | 6/10 |
| Pocket Gamer | 4.5/5 |
| TouchArcade | 5/5 |
| Multiplayer.it | 8.5/10 |
| PC Invasion | 7/10 |
| Pocket Tactics | 3/5 |

=== Warhammer Quest ===
According to the review aggregate website Metacritic, the iOS version of Warhammer Quest received "generally favorable reviews", while the PC version received "mixed or average reviews".

Dan Whitehead of Eurogamer summarized: "With its moreish pace and compelling presentation there's the basis of a really great tablet RPG here, but Warhammer Quest makes two misguided assumptions that hold it back. It assumes that role-playing works better with all the dice and messy statistics brushed off the table, and it assumes that a multiplayer board game and a single-player video game are the same experience."

Brad Cummings of TouchArcade summarized: "Warhammer Quest, while being an excellent port of a classic board game, is actually an amazing dungeon crawler on iOS, no matter what your experience with the source material. You owe it to yourself to check out this excellent hack and slash experience."

Mike Futter of Game Informer summarized: "Put simply, this is an excellent mobile translation of a tabletop experience – but random design elements in the source material hold it back."

Stace Harman of Eurogamer reviewed the PC version and said: "Warhammer Quest is a competent example of a digital board game but in trying to sand its sharp edges and ensure that it's accessible to all, Rodeo has oversimplified the already slight source material."

Adam Smith of Rock Paper Shotgun said: "Its problems include a stack of day one DLC, an in-game gold shop and an interface that hasn't made the transition from touchscreen quite as smoothly as you might hope. Despite all of that, it's simple turn-based tactical combat is weirdly compelling and sundering skaven and snotlings can be a fine way to while away a few lazy evenings."

PC Gamer listed the game seventh on its list of best Warhammer Fantasy games.

On 17 October 2023, Chilled Mouse announced that the game will "shortly" no longer be sold since the contract allowing the game to use the Warhammer intellectual property has ended or was not renewed. Chilled Mouse is the studio responsible for porting the game on PC.

=== Warhammer Quest 2: The End Times ===
Warhammer Quest 2: The End Times received "mixed or average" reviews according to review aggregator Metacritic.

Harry Slater of Pocket Gamer said: "Warhammer Quest 2 builds on the successes of its predecessor. It feels more like a game in its own right though, less tethered to the board games that inspired it. And that can only be a good thing as far as I'm concerned."

Matt Thrower of Pocket Tactics summarized: "Warhammer Quest 2: The End Times is a flashy but simplified successor to the original. It feels less like a board game than the first game and more like a game tailor-made for the digital medium. Unfortunately, a sense of challenge and tension has been lost along the way."

Jason Rodriguez of PC Invasion reviewing the PC version said: "Unfortunately, a number of issues from RNG mechanics to monotonous dungeon runs mar what could’ve been an amazing experience. It might be stellar on mobiles and tablets owing to shorter bursts of playing time. Sadly, as a PC title — where it's common for strategy game playthroughs to last several hours per sitting — it needs more than just a retouch."

=== Warhammer Quest: Silver Tower ===
Sean Martin of Pocket Tactics gave the game eight out of ten and summarized: "Though its champion system could use a little work, Warhammer Quest: Silver Tower is an excellent turn-based strategy game with plenty of potential".

Tommaso Pugliese of Multiplayer.it gave the game 7.0 out of 10 and said: "Warhammer Quest: Silver Tower is a solid turn-based strategy game with nice environments and characters, but it doesn't represent the evolution that we expected to see from the third chapter of the series."
