= Fell Seal: Arbiter's Mark =

2019 video game

- Developer: 6 Eyes Studio
- Publisher: 1C Entertainment
- Programmer: Pierre Leclerc
- Artist: Christina Leclerc
- Composer: Jan Morgenstern
- Engine: Unity
- Platforms: Linux; macOS; PlayStation 4; Windows; Xbox One; Nintendo Switch
- Release: Linux, macOS, PS4, Windows, Xbox One; April 30, 2019; Nintendo Switch; August 13, 2019
- Genre: Tactical role-playing
- Mode: Single-player

Fell Seal: Arbiter's Mark is a tactical role playing video game developed by 6 Eyes Studio and published in 2019 by 1C Entertainment.

== Gameplay ==
Players control peacekeepers known as arbiters. When one of them arrests an arrogant noble for murder, he vows revenge. Fell Seal: Arbiter's Mark is a tactical role-playing game that plays similarly to Final Fantasy Tactics. Players create adventurers who can be customized by choosing character class and special abilities. Combat is turn-based and tactical. The game has multiple difficulty settings. On the lowest difficulty, characters suffer no negative effects from being defeated; otherwise, they receive a temporary penalty if they are immediately forced to fight again. The highest difficulty level introduces permadeath.

== Development ==
6 Eyes Studio was formed by developers who had previously made Black Sigil: Blade of the Exiled. A dispute with their publisher caused that studio, Archcraft, to close down. When programmer Pierre Leclerc experience trouble with his American visa, he took the opportunity to form a new independent studio and work on Fell Seal: Arbiter's Mark. The game was successfully funded on Kickstarter in October 2017 and entered early access in August 2018. 1C Entertainment released the game for Linux, macOS, Windows, PlayStation 4, and Xbox One on April 30, 2019. The Nintendo Switch port was released on August 13, 2019.

== Reception ==
Fell Seal: Arbiter's Mark received positive reviews on Metacritic. Game Informer said the tactical combat was "the stuff dreams are made of". RPGFan called it "a truly magnificent game that SRPG aficionados simply must play". Though calling it derivative of Final Fantasy Tactics, RPGSite recommended it to fans of that game. Digitally Downloaded felt that it perfectly balanced nostalgia and the subversion of genre expectations.

Fell Seal has been criticized for the plot. The writing has been described as "straightforward and forgettable", "awkward and immature", and "a [Final Fantasy] Tactics successor in mechanics only."
