= Hunters (video game series) =

Video game series

- App icon of Episode One
- Developer: Rodeo Games
- Publisher: Rodeo Games
- Platforms: iOS, Android
- Release: Hunters: Episode One; February 26, 2011 (iOS); November 14, 2012 (Android); Hunters 2 March 22, 2012 (iOS)
- Genre: Tactical role-playing
- Mode: Single-player

Hunters is a series of two science fiction tactical role-playing video games developed and published by Rodeo Games for the iOS. The first game, Hunters: Episode One, was released in February 2011. The second game, Hunters 2, was released in March 2012.

== Gameplay ==
Hunters series is a pair of top-down turn-based tactical role-playing games. The games are set in a science fiction universe where humanity has colonized several solar systems and planets are frequently owned by corporations. The player controls a squad of mercenaries, called "hunters", as they conduct missions for corporations on various planets. Maps are made up of square grids and characters use action points on each turn for movement and shooting. Episode One is a freemium game where the game is free to download but your squad is stuck at experience level two until the app is purchased.

== Release ==
Hunters series was developed by Rodeo Games, a studio based in Guildford, England. Hunters: Episode One started development as a multiplayer game. Episode One was released for the iOS on February 26, 2011. By September 2011, Episode One had been downloaded over 550,000 times. Multiplayer was planned to be added to the first game after release. Hunters 2 was announced on December 16, 2011, and released for iOS on March 22, 2012. Episode One was released for Android on November 14, 2012. By January 2013, both games combined had been downloaded over one million times.

Rodeo Games' 2013 game Warhammer Quest uses Taurus game engine, the same engine from Hunters 2. Rodeo Games' 2015 game Warhammer 40,000: Deathwatch is described as a spiritual successor to the Hunters series.

== Reception ==
Hunters: Episode One

Aggregate score
Aggregator	Score
Metacritic	80/100

Review scores
Publication	Score
Gamezebo	3.5/5
Pocket Gamer	3.5/5
TouchArcade	4/5
AppSpy	4/5
Multiplayer.it	8.2/10

Hunters 2

Aggregate score
Aggregator	Score
Metacritic	83/100

Review scores
Publication	Score
Edge	8/10
Pocket Gamer	4/5
TouchArcade	4/5
AppSpy	4/5
Gamereactor	9/10
Multiplayer.it	8.4/10
Pelit	83/100
Slide to Play	4/4

Hunters: Episode One and Hunters 2 both received "generally favorable" reviews according to review aggregator Metacritic.

=== Hunters: Episode One ===
Mike Thompson of Gamezebo summarized: "Overall, Hunters: Episode One is a good title that's on the verge of being absolutely great. Aside from needing some bugs fixed, the game could also use some story missions to provide a solid narrative that players can get behind."

Andrew Nesvadba of AppSpy summarized: "Hunters: Episode One provides a solid grounding for what could be an insanely addictive tactical turn-based title, but bugs and the lack of story missions are holding it back for now."

Tracy Erickson of Pocket Gamer criticised the game design: "The game's primary weakness is an odd structure that limits the number of available missions. New missions are unlocked every 24 hours - in other words, once you complete the initial batch of missions, you have to wait a day before new ones appear. It's an unpleasant restriction and one that seems wholly unnecessary."

In a 2016 retrospective review, Shaun Musgrave of TouchArcade said that "Hunters: Episode One is an important game in terms of carving a path for what followed, but taken as a game rather than a piece of history, I'm not sure it has a lot to offer anymore. The core is solid, but everything good about the game was carried forward into better works."

=== Hunters 2 ===
Erik Carlson of Slide to Play summarized: "Hunters 2 is an exciting and ambitious strategy game with deep RPG elements. If you don't mind a short campaign mode, then the ever-changing missions, fun character customization, and awesome presentation will keep you coming back on a daily basis."

Andrew Nesvadba of AppSpy summarized: "Hunters 2 moves the series forward, stepping away from the sterile and automatically generated levels of the original and on to something more exciting; a great pick for turn-based fans after a game ready to punish players for poor decisions."

Damien of McFerran Pocket Gamer summarized: "Hunters 2 is an almost perfect sequel - it improves on what has gone before without drastically changing too many things. The presence of in-app purchasing is unfortunate, but not enough to sully the good work done elsewhere. Turn-based strategy fans should pick it up".

Rich Stanton of Eurogamer said: "Hunters 2 does everything bigger, better, and in even more detail. It's a much better game in almost every way, with every addition adding a little crackle to the mix. And yet it still leaves you craving something more."
