= SOFEL =

Japanese information technology company

SOFEL Co., Ltd.
- SOFEL Logo
- Native name: 株式会社ソフエル
- Company type: Unknown
- Industry: Information technology
- Founded: May 1979
- Headquarters: HQ in Tokyo, Japan; Laboratory in Chiba, Japan
- Key people: Takeshi Iga: CEO, Yuji Yamaguchi: president
- Revenue: JPY 91 million
- Number of employees: 50
- Website: www.sofel.co.jp

SOFEL Co., Ltd. (株式会社ソフエル, Kabushiki-gaisha Sofueru) (stands for SOFtware Engineering Laboratory) is a Japanese information technology company involved with business application systems development, multimedia service and system development, and the development of RFID services and systems. It was established in May 1979 to provide software such as COMPS to their major clients.

The company was briefly involved with video games in the late 1980s and early 1990s. It produced games for the Nintendo Entertainment System, Super Nintendo Entertainment System, and Game Boy. Its best-known games include Casino Kid and Wall Street Kid.
