= Shoulder-a-Coffin Kuro =

Japanese manga series

- Cover of Shoulder-a-Coffin Kuro volume 1 by Hōbunsha featuring the main character Kuro.

棺担ぎのクロ。〜懐中旅話〜 (Hitsugi Katsugi no Kuro. ~Kaichū Tabi no Wa~)
- Genre: Adventure, Dark fantasy, Mystery
- Manga
- Written by: Satoko Kiyuduki
- Published by: Hōbunsha
- English publisher: NA: Yen Press
- Magazine: Manga Time Kirara
- Original run: December 2004 – May 2018
- Volumes: 8

Shoulder-a-Coffin Kuro (Japanese: 棺担ぎのクロ。〜懐中旅話〜, Hepburn: Hitsugi Katsugi no Kuro. ~Kaichū Tabi no Wa~; lit. Kuro the Coffin Bearer ~Pocket Travel Tales~) is a Japanese manga series by Satoko Kiyuduki, serialized in Hōbunsha's seinen manga magazine Manga Time Kirara since December 2004. The manga was on hiatus from 2009 to 2012, but resumed and the last compiled volume was published in July 2018. In December 2007, Yen Press licensed the series for release in North America where all of the volumes have been released.

== Plot ==
A traveling girl known as Kuro searches the land for the witch that cast a curse on her, that stains her body black and will eventually kill her if not stopped. Kuro travels with two young, shapeshifting twins named Sanju and Nijuku, as well as her teacher, friend and companion Sen, who must take the form of 1,000 bats. They meet many strange, unusual people on their journey and supernatural occurrences happen frequently. However, the travelers' normal course of action is to help them solve their problems and then be on their way. Sometimes, these meetings reveal information about the witch, and occasionally they find a person who has been cursed by the witch as well.

== Characters ==
Kuro (クロ, Kuro)
Voiced by: Minami Takayama (Drama CD), Mai Kanazawa (Kirara Fantasia)
The main heroine of the story. Kuro is depicted in a black coat and a wide-brimmed black hat with dark blue hair and hazel eyes, seen carrying around a large coffin. Before she was cursed, her name was 'Sunya' (derived from the Sanskrit word for "state of nothingness") but is referred to as 'Kuro' (Japanese word for black) after finding Nijuku and Sanju. Kuro found her former name to be unfitting with her cursed state because it was lady like and feminine. Personality-wise, she is calm and collective, and takes the role as Nijuku and Sanju's guardian. She is searching for the witch who cursed her and her friend, Sen. Her curse isn't well described at first, but it is made known early on that she wears bandages beneath her clothes in order to help slow the effects, and that it colors her skin black. Whether this coloring penetrates into her internal organs is debatable, but in the second volume, another girl a nearly identical curse is found in a flashback, whose body was dissolving where the black has taken hold. It is revealed that Kuro's curse worsens whenever she feels a strong emotion. However, the part of Kuro's curse that set it apart from that of other individuals is that she is unable to die. Hifumi took that upon their first meeting to help "complete" herself. Several times other people have attempted to murder Kuro, but each time the weapon they are wielding will malfunction, killing them instead.
Sen (セン, Sen)
Voiced by: Kyōsei Tsukui (Drama CD)
Kuro's friend, long-time companion and teacher. Sen, although very snarky as well as a womanizer, is very knowledgeable and wise. He was cursed to take the form of 1,000 bats, which he can seemingly control to a degree, although occasionally they do wander off or go missing. His name is a play on words, as he was Kuro's teacher (Sensei), and was then cursed to split apart into 1,000 bats. He can be accurately portrayed as the opposite of Kuro, who tends to be reserved and straightforward, while Sen is eccentric and speaks with sarcasm. In the third volume of the manga, his curse was lifted for one night due to the "stained moon", hinting at his true from. Before being cursed by Hifumi, Sen was the middle son of feudal lord. He was seen as outlandish loner and lived in a mansion full of books, which caused rumors in the town to spread before Kuro's arrival that he was a maniac and/or monster of sorts.
Nijuku (ニジュク, Nijuku)
Voiced by: Ai Tokunaga (Drama CD)
A little girl who is found with her sister, Sanju, by Kuro. Both Sanju and Nijuku show shape-shifting abilities as well as other supernatural traits, such as draining color from the environment and applying it to other objects or creatures and being able to change their size at will. Both Nijuku and Sanju are usually depicted with cat-ears and a tail. Nijuku's ears and tail are black, due to her trying to take some of Kuro's black coloring, which comes from her curse. Sanju and Nijuku were the professor's first successful homunculi. Never being outside of the laboratory in which they were manufactured, the sisters are both learning about the world around them. Nijuku is the older twin, and is more gentle and level-headed than Sanju. Either way, both of them are very energetic and curious about everything.
Sanju (サンジュ, Sanju)
Voiced by: Ai Nonaka (Drama CD)
The sister of Nijuku, found by Kuro. She is younger as well as very emotional. Sanju tends to act impulsively, and disliked Kuro at first and tried to run away to find the professor, whom she assumed to be alive. After she warmed up to her, Sanju affectionately nicknames Kuro "Kuro-cha". Although Sanju means well, dislike her because she is rough with them as she does not understand that they can feel pain. This results in the death of a village child's kitten on her account.
The Professor (教授, Kyōju)
A man who strived to create life as he was never happy with anything as a child, seeing all creation as dull, lifeless or "gray". The professor's real name is unknown. He states that fundamental issue is that he is in the world that God created, so no matter what materials are combined, the outcome will be "gray" as well. It is possible that he has depression as well as synesthesia. This apathetic outlook on life changes when he meets a woman whose aura he perceives as "black". The Professor then combines this woman and her two sisters in a vial, resulting in "Hifumi", the witch that cursed Kuro and Sen. The youngest sister was Kuro's mother. He also experimented with two dying girls and two kittens, resulting in Sanju and Nijuku. These were The professor's only successful humanoid creations. It is implied that one of his failed experiments ended up killing him, as he was found dead when Kuro arrived, rescuing the twins.

== Media ==
=== Manga ===
The series started serialization in the Japanese Yonkoma magazine "Manga Time Kirara", published by Hōbunsha. The first manga volume was released in Japan on March 27, 2006. Two volumes were released before the series was put on hiatus in 2009 for unknown reasons. In 2012, a wraparound on the book jacket of the fourth volume of GA Geijutsuka Art Design Class, also by Kiyuduki, announced Kuro would resume serialization and that the long delayed third volume would start shipping. For the week of January 23–29, 2012 the third volume of Shoulder a Coffin ranked #28 on the Japanese Comic Ranking with 23,425 copies sold. As of 2019, eight volumes have been released all together.

In December, 2007 through a panel at New York Anime Festival, Yen Press announced it had licensed the series for release in North America. The author Satoko Kiyuduki was said to be "excited but hesitant" on how the humor would be received. All eight volumes have been released by Yen Press.

=== Drama CD ===
A Drama CD was released by Geneon Universal on July 25, 2007, and distributed through Frontier Works. The CD features a story which was done by Satoko Kiyuduki. Seven tracks are present with the story narrator being Sen the bat, a character from the series. In the story the cast is introduced, and four frames of the series are focused on.

=== Video game ===
Characters from the series appear alongside other Manga Time Kirara characters in the 2019 mobile RPG, Kirara Fantasia.

== Reception ==
The first volume of the series was reviewed by Casey Brienza from Anime News Network. She gave the volume an overall rating of a C− calling the reading experience "annoying". She went on to praise the artwork however, and the color of the pages. John Rose from the Fandom Post gave the third and fourth volumes a passing "A" grade, calling them a "phenomenal read" with "gorgeous art". Katherine Dacey from PopCultureShock gave the first volume an A− rating. She says in her review that the "mixture of melancholy and humor" makes for a good read, and called it thought-provoking.
