= Kyōko Hikami =

Japanese voice actress (born 1969)

- 氷上恭子
- Born: January 11, 1969 (age 57); Takarazuka, Hyōgo, Japan
- Occupation: Voice actress
- Years active: 1992–present
- Agent: Mausu Promotion
- Spouse: Tadayuki Hashimoto (m. 2018)

Kyōko Hikami (氷上 恭子, Hikami Kyōko; born January 11, 1969) is a Japanese voice actress. Her major roles include title character Momoko Hanasaki in the anime Wedding Peach, Hikaru Usada / Rabi~en~Rose in Di Gi Charat, Hebi no Yuki (Snake) in Angel Tales, Tsubaki Takamura in Sakura Wars, and Urara Kasuga in Sakura Diaries. Recent roles include Sakagami-sensei in Love Lab and Yuki Sakurakōji in Code:Breaker. She is part of the voice actress trio Furil, which also consists of Wedding Peach voice castmates Yūko Miyamura and Yukana.

== Filmography ==
=== Anime ===
List of voice performances in anime
Year	Title	Role	Notes	Source
1992	Crayon Shin-chan	Woman		
1992	Yu Yu Hakusho	Kasumi Rin		
1992	Kobo-chan	Akira, Shirakawa		
1993	Kyō Kara Ore Wa!!	Female Student	OVA	
1994	Tottemo! Luckyman	Machiko Medatsu		
1994	Blue Seed	Masako		
1994	Mahōjin Guru Guru	Griel		
1994	Cooking Papa	Female Student	Ep. 125	
1995	Ninku	Yuka		
1995	Black Jack	Katina	OVA ep 4	
1995	Ping-Pong Club	Female teacher		
1995–1997	Wedding Peach series	Momoko Hanasaki / Wedding Peach	Also DX	
1995	Fushigi Yûgi	Girl A, Girl B	TV series	
1995	Juuni Senshi Bakuretsu Eto Ranger	Cream, Juken		
1995	Megami Paradise	Pastel		
1995	Mojacko	Piroro, Yumi		
1995	Toma Kishinden Oni	Moegi		
1995–1996	Idol Project	Kiwi		
1996	VS Knight Ramune & 40 Fire	Cacao		
1996	B't X	Nasha		
1996	Burn-Up W	Maria	OVA	
1996	Battle Arena Toshinden	Ellis		
1996	Saber Marionette J	Gemini		
1996	Raideen the Superior	Girl	Ep. 35	
1996–1997	Gall Force: The Revolution	Pony	OAV series	
1996	Magical Project S	Hikari Asahina	Ep. 18	
1996	Galaxy Fraulein Yuna Returns	Ayako	2nd OVA series	
1997	Haunted Junction	Blue Hanten	Ep. 8	
1997	Sakura Diaries	Urara Kasuga	OVA	
1997	VS Knight Ramune & 40 Fresh	Cacao	OVA series	
1997	Wild Cardz	Prince Macdo, Prince Narudo		
1997	Anime Ganbare Goemon	Asuka Tsuchiya		
1997	Vampire Princess Miyu	Yuko Shigetoshi	TV ep. 2	
1998	Power Dolls Project Alpha	Amy Pershing	OVA series	
1998	Trigun	Stefany		
1998	Cardcaptor Sakura	Yoko Nakagawa	Ep. 14	
1998	Princess Nine	Seira Morimura		
1998	Shadow Skill: Eigi	Rai Kurokkunesu		
1998	Sakura Wars: The Gorgeous Blooming Cherry Blossoms	Tsubaki Takamura	OVA ep. 4	
1998	Bubblegum Crisis Tokyo 2040	Ellen	Ep. 7	
1998	Psychic Force	Wendy	OVA	
1999	Legend of Himiko	Kouran		
1999	To Heart	Kotone Himekawa		
1999	Betterman	Hinoki Sai		
1999	Gokudo	Nihi		
1999	Great Teacher Onizuka	Motoko Ohashi		
1999	Omishi Magical Theater: Risky Safety	Kairi		
1999	Infinite Ryvius	Cullen Lucciora, Juli Bahana		
1999	Trouble Chocolate	Deborah		
1999–2006	Di Gi Charat series	Hikaru Usada / Rabi~en~Rose	Also OVAs, specials	
1999–2000	Sakura Wars: The Radiant Gorgeous Blooming Cherry Blossoms	Tsubaki Takamura	OVA	
1999	Zoku Zoku Mura no Obaketachi	Pii	Ep. 2	
2000	Mon Colle Knights	Batchii, Mii		
2000	Platinumhugen Ordian	Jill		
2000	Sakura Wars	Tsubaki Takamura	TV series	
2000	Hand Maid May	Cyberdoll Sara		
2000	Shin Megami Tensei: DeviChil	Jack Frost, Karen, Pixie, Kamaitachi		
2000	Android Kikaider: The Animation	Miyuki		
2001	Super Gals! Ran Kotobuki	Shiori Asai	Ep. 12	
2001	Haré+Guu	Tomoyo Mamou		
2001–2002	Sister Princess series	Mamimi "Mami" Yamagami	Also RePure	
2001	Geneshaft	Ema		
2001	One: Kagayaku Kisetsu e	Yukimi Miyami	OAV	
2001	Final Fantasy: Unlimited	Lisa Pacifist		
2001	Angel Tales	Hebi no Yuki (Snake)	TV series	
2001	Najica Blitz Tactics	Ai Irie	Ep. 4	
2002	Panyo Panyo Di Gi Charat	Narrator		
2002	Aquarian Age: Sign for Evolution	Yui Kono		
2002	Magical Shopping Arcade Abenobashi	Mitsuyo Imamiya		
2002	Atashin'chi	Sudo		
2002	Nakoruru	Nakoruru's Mother, Rera	OVA (一般)	
2002	Witch Hunter Robin	Yurika Dōjima		
2002	Spiral	Reiko Hatsuyama		
2002	Ghost in the Shell: Stand Alone Complex	Kanabi		
2002	Naruto	Mai Kagetsu		
2002	Piano	Saito-san		
2003	Angel Tales	Hebi no Yuki (Snake)	OVA series	
2003	Di Gi Charat Nyo	Hikaru Usada / Rabi~en~Rose		
2003	Dear Boys	Kaori Kudo		
2003	Saint Beast	Yuki Megami		
2003	Yami to Boushi to Hon no Tabibito	Meirin, Tamamo no Mae		
2003	Fullmetal Alchemist	Paninya		
2003	Uninhabited Planet Survive!	Zilba		
2003	Leave it to Piyoko!	Hikaru Usada / Rabi~en~Rose	OAV	
2004	Sgt. Frog	Hikari Usanda		
2004	Monster	Lotte Frank		
2004	Burst Angel	Maria		
2004	ToHeart: Remember my memories	Kotone Himekawa		
2004	Samurai Gun	Kurenai		
2004	Yakitate!! Japan	Hokahoka Oneesan	Ep. 53	
2005	Gallery Fake	Linda	Ep. 15	
2005	Majime ni Fumajime: Kaiketsu Zorori	Sandy		
2005	Tide-Line Blue	Jose		
2005	Gunparade Orchestra	Satomi Kozeki		
2006	Girl's High	Kyoko Himeji		
2006	xxxHolic	Kaoruko, Sakurako	Ep. 14, 15	
2006	Project G.A. ja:ギャラクシーエンジェる〜ん	Usada Meijin / Rabi~en~Rose		
2006	Galaxy Angel Rune	Hikaru Usada / Rabi~en~Rose	TV ep. 3	
2006	Shōnen Onmyōji	Atsuko		
2006	My-Hime	Mutsumi Kojo		
2006–2008	Shooting Star Rockman	Harp	Also Tribe	
2007	Tokyo Majin series	Maiko Takamizawa	Also 2nd Act	
2007	Hitohira	Risaki Nishida		
2007	The Story of Saiunkoku	Ruka Hanada		
2007	Lovely Complex	Stylist Nakahara		
2007	Shigurui: Death Frenzy	Oyo お蓉		
2007	Myself; Yourself	Staff		
2008	Hatenkō Yūgi	Vincent		
2008	Top Secret ~The Revelation~	Misa Yoshino		
2008	Rosario + Vampire Capu2	Apsara-sensei		
2009	Fresh Pretty Cure!	Ayumi Momozono		
2009	Cross Game	Kimie Kitamura		
2010	Hanamaru Kindergarten	Tsuchida's mother		
2010	Lilpri	Tomoko Sasaki		
2010	Yosuga no Sora	Haruka's Mother	Ep. 10	
2011	Sket Dance	Mariji Blue		
2011	Softenni	Kyōko Miyoshi		
2012	Listen to Me, Girls. I Am Your Father!	Yoshiko Sahara		
2012	Smile Precure!	Chiharu Kise		
2012	Code:Breaker	Yuki Sakurakōji		
2013	Devil Survivor 2: The Animation	Black Frost		
2013	Brothers Conflict	Kaori Kishida		
2013	Love Lab	Sakagami-sensei		
2013–2014	Aikatsu!	Koharu Oozora	Season 2 and 3	
2015	Kamisama Kiss	Kami Ochi		
2021	Boruto: Naruto Next Generations	Akita Inuzuka		
2021	Eden	A37		
2022	Reiwa no Di Gi Charat	Rabi~en~Rose		
2023	High Rollers: Time to roll the dice	Kelsey		

=== Films ===
List of voice performances in feature films
Year	Title	Role	Notes	Source
1997	Ultra Nyan: Hoshizora Kara Maiorita Fushigi Neko (movie)	Momo		
1998	Ultra Nyan 2: Happy Daisakusen	Momo		
1998	Pocket Monsters the Movie: Mewtwo Strikes Back	Aitwo		ANN
1998	Slayers Gorgeous	Marlene Karubato		
2001	Doraemon: Nobita and the Winged Braves	Milk		
2001	Sakura Wars: The Movie	Tsubaki Takamura		
2001	Di Gi Charat – A Trip to the Planet	Hikaru Usada / Rabi~en~Rose		
2004	Detective Conan: Magician of the Silver Sky	Natsuki Sakai		
2009	Fresh PreCure the Movie: The Kingdom of Toys has Lots of Secrets!?	Ayumi Toen		
2013	Majocco Shimai no Yoyo to Nene	Oyomi		
2023	Hokkyoku Hyakkaten no Concierge-san	Caribbean Monk Seal		

=== Video games ===
List of voice performances in video games
Year	Title	Role	Notes	Source
1994	Power Dolls 2	Amy Pershing	PS1/PS2	
1995	Seifuku Densetsu Pretty Fighter X	Aoki Marin	Sega Saturn	
1995	Tokimeki Mah Jong Paradise: Koi no tenpai beat		3DO, Sega Saturn	
1996	Tokimeki Card Paradise: Koi no Royal Straight Flush		PC-FX	
1996	Lunar: Silver Star Story Complete	Luna Noah	Sega Saturn	
1996	Nightruth: Explanation of the Paranormal – Yami no Tobira	Remika Kujou	Sega Saturn	
1996	Mahou Shoujo Fancy Coco	Milk Kahlua	PlayStation	
1996	Wedding Peach: Doki Doki Oironaoshi	Momoko Hanasaki	PlayStation	
1996–2003	Sakura Wars series	Tsubaki Takamura		
1996	Fist	Marin Aoki	PS1/PS2	
1996	Alice in Cyberland	Saki Takakura	PlayStation	
1997	Shinseiki Evangelion: 2nd Impression	Mayumi Yamagichi	Sega Saturn	
1997	Doki Doki Pretty League ja:ドキドキプリティリーグ	Reiko Nakayama	PS1/PS2	
1997	Cross Romance: Koi to Mahjong to Hanafuda to	Yurika Fushimi		
1997	Jantei Battle Cosplayer	Yuriko	Sega Saturn	
1997	Bulk Slash	Rira Heart	Sega Saturn	
1997	Eternal Fantasy	Sheila Sheffield		
1997	Breath of Fire III	Nina	PS1/PS2	
1997	Ayakashi Ninden Kunoichiban	Haruka Shiranui	PS1/PS2	
1997	Zen-Nippon Bishoujou Grand Prix: Find Love		Sega Saturn	
1997	Wizard's Harmony 2	Tifa Clausen		
1997	10101: Will the Starship	Yu Yaron	PS1/PS2	
1997	Galaxy Fraulein Yuna 3: Lightning Angel	亜耶乎	Sega Saturn	
1997	The Last Blade	Hibiki Takane	Other	
1998	The Star Bowling Vol. 2		Sega Saturn	
1998	The Star Bowling DX		PlayStation	
1998	Dōkoku soshite... ja:慟哭 そして...	華苗	Sega Saturn	
1998	Misa no Mahou Monogatari	Sakuraba Miki	PlayStation	
1998	Anime Freak FX Vol. 6	Kyoko Hikami	PC-FX	
1998	Zutto Issho ja:ずっといっしょ	Kaoru Wakabayashi, Kotone Misaki	PS1/PS2	
1998	Pocket Love 2	Suzune Aikawa	Other	
1998	Dragon Force II: Kamisarishi Daichi ni	Lily, Hilda	Sega Saturn	
1998	Lunar: Silver Star Story Complete	Luna Noah	PS1/PS2	
1998	Galaxy Fraulein Yuna: Final Edition	Ayako	PS1/PS2	
1998	Ojousama Express ja:お嬢様特急	Mami Sakurai		
1998	Kimagure My Baby -Musume no sugoroku seichouki- [PlayStation]	Miki	PlayStation	
1998	Doki Doki Pretty League: Nekketsu Otome Seishunki	Reiko Nakayama	PS1/PS2	
1998	Poporogu ja:ポポローグ	Milt	PS1/PS2	
1998	Atelier Elie: The Alchemist of Salburg 2	Marurone	PS1/PS2	
1998	17 Sai -My Dear Angel-	Ayaka Natsume	Windows	
1998	The Last Blade 2	Takane Hibiki	Arcade, Neo Geo]	
1999	Evil Zone	Saizuki Setsuna	PlayStation	
1999	Eberouge 2	Mar Anhalt	PlayStation	
1999	Psychic Force 2012	Wendy Rian	Dreamcast, Windows]	
1999	Sonata	Fushimi Nayabashi	PS1/PS2	
1999	Legend of Himiko	Kouran	PS1/PS2	
1999	Doki Doki On Air 2	guest	Windows, Mac, PlayStation	
1999	To Heart	Kotone Himekawa	PS1/PS2	
1999	Dancing Blade: Katteni Momotenshi!	Nazuna	PlayStation	
1999	Ouka Houshin	Ryuura Koushu	Dreamcast	
1999	Desire	Makoto Izumi		
2000	ja:夏色剣術小町	春日部舞	PS1/PS2	
2000	Breath of Fire IV	Nina	PS1/PS2	
2000	Eternal Suite All Star Project ja:悠久組曲 All Star Project	Sheila Sheffield	PS1/PS2	
2000	Happy Salvage	Miranda	PS1/PS2	
2000	Tenshi no Present: Marl Ōkoku Monogatari	Pekonyan	PS1/PS2	
2001	Di Gi Charat Fantasy	Rabi en Rose	Windows98/ME/2000]	
2001	Marl de Jigsaw	Pekonyan	PS1/PS2	
2002	Breath of Fire: Dragon Quarter	Nina	PS1/PS2	
2003	To Heart	Kotone Himekawa	PC (一般)	
2003	Sakura Setsugetsuka ja:SAKURA 〜雪月華〜	Yuuko Fukami	PS1/PS2	
2003	Ys I&II Eternal Story	Feena		
2003	Capcom vs. SNK 2 EO	Takamine Hibiki	GameCube, PS2, Xbox]	
2003	Samurai Shodown V	Leila	Other	
2003	Di Gi Charat Fantasy Excellent	Rabi en Rose	Playstation2]	
2004	ja:3年B組金八先生 伝説の教壇に立て!	Ayaka Hijiri	PS1/PS2	
2004	Sentimental Prelude ja:センチメンタルプレリュード	Satomi Hasegawa	PS1/PS2	
2005	Darkstalkers Chronicle: The Chaos Tower		PSP]	
2005	Sakura Setsugetsuka: Beauties of Nature Premium Edition ja:SAKURA 〜雪月華〜	Yuuko Fukami	PC (一般)	
2005	Mai-HiME: Unmei no Keitōju	Mutsumi Kujo (Saeko Kuga)	PS1/PS2	
2005	Princess Concerto	Chariot	PC (一般)	
2005	Shadow of the Colossus	Dorumin	PS1/PS2	
2005	Yoshitsune-ki 義経紀	Gozen Shizuka	PS1/PS2	
2006	True Tears	Asumi Akiyama		
2006	Gunparade Orchestra: Ao no Shou	Satomi Koseki	PS1/PS2	
2006	Joshikōsei Game's High	Kyoko Himeji	PS1/PS2	
2007	Higurashi no Naku Koro ni Matsuri	間宮リナ	PS1/PS2	
2007	Shinkyoku Sōkai Polyphonica The Black	ウォナーリア・ゲニカ・ヤクリトーレ		
2009	Lunar: Silver Star Harmony	Luna Noah	PSP	
2011	Catherine	Martha Uspensky	PS3	
2012	Root Double: Before Crime * After Days	Kirara & Beyondo Kirmi	Xbox 360	
2014	Super Heroine Chronicle	Hikaru Usada / Rabi~en~Rose		
2014	Stranger of Sword City	Maririsu kuraibaumu		
2015	Higurashi When They Cry Sui	間宮リナ		
2016	Breath of Fire 6: Hakuryū no Shugosha-tachi	Nina	iOS, AND	
2021	Teppen	Nina	iOS, AND	

=== Dubbing ===
List of dub performances in overseas productions
Title	Role	Notes	Source
Boy Meets World	Topanga		
Didier	Mijo		
Fame	Michelle		
Hideaway	Samantha		
Home Alone 2: Lost in New York	Linney		
Honey, I Blew Up the Kid	Adam		
Nick of Time	Courtney Chase		
Scream	Sidney Prescott	Neve Campbell	
The Broken Chain	Catherine		
U Turn	Jenny	Claire Danes	
Night Angel 真夜中の天使	Linda		
PaPa	Lee Young Ae		

=== Audio dramas ===
List of voice performances in audio dramas
Title	Role	Notes	Source
Di Gi Charat	Hikaru Usada		
Hand Maid May	CBD Sara		
Higurahi no naku koro ni kai tsumihoroboshi-hen	Rina Mamiya		
Infinite Ryvius			
Kindaichi Case Files: akuma kumikyoku satsujin jiken	Miyuki Nanase		
Legend of Himiko	Kouran		
Little Princess: Marl Ōkoku no Ningyō Hime 2: Another Diary			
Megami Paradise	Pastel		
Power Dolls	Amy Pershing	radio	
Power Dolls Wedding March	Amy Pershing		
Psychic Force	Wendy Ryan	CD, Radio	
Sakura Wars	Takamura Tsubaki		
Wedding Peach	Momoko Hanasaki		
Bouken Radio Movie CD Vol 2	Sou Meiran		
Click and Dead	Erina		
Desire	Makoto Izumi		
Happy Boy	Neko-sensei		
Houshin Engi	Tou Sengyoku		
Jajauma Quartette	Prince Macdo, Prince Narudo	Radio	
Kindaichi Case Files: shinigami byōin satsujin jiken	Miyuki Nanase		
Luna Silver Story Lunatic Festa	Luna		
Mahou Shoujo Fancy CoCo	Milk Kahlua		
Minna de tsukuru Yuukyuu CDI			
Neko na Kankei	Asuka		
Pocket Monster Sound Picture Box "Mewtwo no tanjou"	Ai		
Popful Mail The Next Generation	Rem		
Shin Kaori kōkō ren'ai sasupensu koibito-tachi no pashi~on 新花織高校恋愛サスペンス 恋人たちのパシォン	Chitose Airport Female Employees		
Shinsetsu Samurai Spirits Bushidou Retsuden	Rimururu	Radio	
Suehiro Shoutengai Pre-Drama CD -Prelude-	Kusaka Chiharu		
Tohshinden -Before Stage-	Ellis		
Wrestle Angels Original Fighting Story	Megumi Muto		
Yuukyuu Gensoukyoku "Yuukyuu Ongakusai"			
Yuukyuu Gensoukyoku THE BEST -Selected by Characters-	Sheila Sheffield		
