= Nao Minakami =

Japanese singer (born 1987)

Nao Minakami (みなかみ 菜緒)
- Also known as: Naosuke (なおすけ, Naosuke)
- Born: September 20, 1987 (age 38)
- Origin: Kagoshima Prefecture, Japan
- Genres: J-Pop
- Instruments: Singing
- Years active: 2008–present
- Labels: Star Child, King Records
- Website: http://www.broccoli.co.jp/dejiko/

Nao Minakami (みなかみ 菜緒, Minakami Nao; born on September 20, 1987) is a Japanese singer, a voice actress, and is an undergraduate school student of Tokyo University, one of the top-level research universities in Japan. Her real name is Nao Sakamoto (坂元 菜緒, Sakamoto Nao), and she is sometimes affectionately nicknamed "Naosuke" (なおすけ) by her Japanese fans.

She is a member of the singing group, New DUP, which was founded by BROCCOLI Inc. to promote its mascot characters, Dejiko, Usada and Puchiko (from the anime Di Gi Charat), where Minakami is the voice actress for Puchiko.

New DUP hosts a radio show called "Degiko Radio" (でじこラジオ, "Radio produced by Degiko"), and it comprises three Japanese voice actresses: Satomi Akesaka, Yasawa Rieka, and Minakami.

== Biography ==
Nao Minakami was born in Kagoshima, Japan. As a child, she was a huge fan of the anime series Di Gi Charat and has later stated that the series was her first inspiration to become a voice artist.

As 2008 is the tenth anniversary of the series Di Gi Charat, BROCCOLI Inc. decided to recast actress of main characters of series Di Gi Charat. Minakami's career as a voice actress started when she won the audition for a character from the forementioned series, Puchiko, in January, 2008. She was chosen for the role among over a thousand candidates. In the same month, the new cast of Degiko, Puchiko and Usada, who are Satomi Akesaka, Nao Minakami and Rieka Yazawa respectively, founded New DUP, a J-Pop group, to promote series Di Gi Charat and to help launch the voice actresses' careers.

== Music ==
- Kimi wa Boku no Energy (as a member of New DUP)

== Radio ==
- Degiko Radio 2008
