= Panyo Panyo Di Gi Charat =

Anime television series

- English version of the logo for the anime series Panyo Panyo Di Gi Charat

ぱにょぱにょ デ・ジ・キャラット (Panyo Panyo De Ji Kyaratto)
- Genre: Comedy, Fantasy, Science fiction
- Anime television series
- Directed by: Masato Takayanagi
- Studio: Madhouse
- Licensed by: AUS: Madman Entertainment; NA: ADV Films (2004-2008)
- Original network: Animax
- Original run: January 5, 2002 – September 30, 2002
- Episodes: 48
- Manga
- Written by: Hina
- Published by: Shogakukan
- Magazine: Ciao
- Original run: 2001 – 2003

Panyo Panyo Di Gi Charat (ぱにょぱにょ デ・ジ・キャラット, Panyo Panyo De Ji Kyaratto) is the prequel to the popular anime series Di Gi Charat. It features Princess Dejiko and Puchiko as young children home at planet Di Gi Charat. The two and their friends Meek and Rinna set off to bring happiness to the citizens of planet Di Gi Charat, while Piyoko and Deji Devil try to stop them.

== Plot ==
While Princess Dejiko is reading a book, she realizes that she "needs" to help people all over the world. Dejiko takes Puchiko with her and tries to leave the castle, but Dejiko's tutor interrupts because it is her study time. Dejiko uses her laser eye beam and attempts to escape the castle numerous times, each time being thwarted by traps and gadgets set up by the tutor. Eventually, the duo are caught. A very petulant Dejiko stands her ground, and the tutor finally relents and lets Dejiko and Puchiko go outside the castle grounds, on the condition that they take Gema with them as a chaperon.

In the following episode the trio arrive at the popular Rinna's Cake Shop. The shop is closed, and people are in line in front of the shop, waiting patiently for it to open. Dejiko, Puchiko, and Gema forcibly enter the shop and find that the owner, Rinna, is asleep. Dejiko decides that she and her friends will make the cakes for Rinna while she is sleeping. Everything seems to be okay until the cakes fall in the oven. When Dejiko laments, Rinna suddenly awakens to make the cakes. As she bakes, she sings that the missing ingredient in Dejiko's cake recipe was love and the anticipation of seeing her customers' happy faces, which she calls "baking powder of the heart." Confident again, Dejiko says that she will help Rinna make the day's cakes, but Rinna is asleep again. Later on, Rinna decides to close the cake shop to take an extended break and join Dejiko and her friends.

A cat appears and jumps on Dejiko's head. A girl named Meek, appears in pursuit of the cat, but Dejiko mistakes Meek for the devil. Later, at a fish shop, where the group again runs into Meek, the cat appears and steals some fish. Meek, this time with the help of Dejiko and friends, tries again to catch the cat, but fails once more. When it appears that the cat is cornered, her kittens emerge from a hole in the wall. Meek finally realizes that the cat only wanted to feed its family and blithely decides to blame Dejiko and friends for stealing the fish. Meek joins the merry band not long after.

== Extended overview ==
Panyo Panyo was arranged into five-minute mini episodes. This was intended to make it feel like classic four panel manga. Panyo Panyo, however, did not have wide open endings like the original did.

== License ==
Panyo Panyo Di Gi Charat is licensed by ADV Films and is distributed in the United States by them. It is distributed in Australia by Madman Entertainment.

== Principal characters ==
Dejiko

Dejiko - でじこ (also known as Di Gi Charat) The princess of planet Di Gi Charat. After reading a book about a famous philanthropist, she made a vow to bring happiness to every person who lives on Di Gi Charat. In order to leave the castle, she had to promise her teacher that she would take Gema along as a chaperon. She wears a white hat shaped like cat ears, with a pair of gold bells on it. She ends her sentences with "-nyo!".

- Voiced by: Asami Sanada (Japanese); Luci Christian (English)

Puchiko - ぷちこ (also known as Petit Charat) A young companion of Dejiko. She speaks very infrequently. Her cat ear-shaped hat is orange with brown stripes on it. She ends her sentences with "-nyu".

- Voiced by: Miyuki Sawashiro (Japanese); Hilary Haag (English)

Meek (Mike) - みけ Meek might be called a "tomboy", and also has a tendency to yell. She and Dejiko occasionally disagree. She apparently dislikes sea slugs. Meek lives with her parents at a fish shop, and ends her sentences with "-mya". Incidentally, her mother and father also end their sentences with "-mya".

- Voiced by: Etsuko Kozakura (Japanese); Cynthia Martinez (English)

Rinna - りんな Rinna is the owner of her own cake shop. In episode 2, the townspeople claim that she makes the most delicious cakes on the planet; however, they have no idea when her shop will open, as Rinna has a tendency to fall asleep without warning. In a later episode, it is revealed that Rinna can run at an impossible speed; she does not usually do it because she "doesn't like to run." Rinna ends her sentences with "-myu". Rinna also starred in Di Gi Charat Nyo!.

- Voiced by: Atsuko Enomoto (Japanese); Allison Sumrall (English)

Piyoko - ぴよこ (also known as Pyocola Analogue III ) A young girl who works for Deji Devil. Apparently, she is the leader of the Black Gema Gema Gang, despite being only six years old. She addresses Deji Devil as "Deji Devil-sama" ("Lord Deji Devil"; in the dub, she refers to him as "Boss"), but according to her character profile, she has little actual respect for him. Dejiko and company do not treat her or Deji Devil as a threat, going so far as to refer to Piyoko as "Piyoko-chan" as if they were close friends. Piyoko ends her sentences with "-pyo".

- Voiced by: Megumi Hayashibara (Japanese); Kira Vincent-Davis (English)

Deji Devil - デジデビル Deji Devil's mission is apparently "to make everyone on Di Gi Charat unhappy". Thus, his and Dejiko's quests are somewhat mutually exclusive. Aside from his wings and cape, his body has no substance, therefore he is able to pass through objects. He supposedly is afraid of ghosts. He ends his sentences with "-devi". In one of the final episodes, it is revealed the Deji Devil can transform into a large pink, flying, panda-like being referred to as "The King of Demons". In this "King of Demons" form, he is no more solid than he is ordinarily; however, he gains the ability to fire lasers from his mouth. According to him, he doesn't usually use this form because "people might start to expect it".

- Voiced by: Yuji Ueda (Japanese); Andy McAvin (English)

Gema - ゲマ Gema is a perfectly round, floating, yellow creature who accompanies Dejiko everywhere as a chaperon. According to his character profile page, most of Gema's data is unknown (including what species he is). He bears a slight resemblance to Pac-Man; the most notable feature about him is his apparently upside down face.

- Favorite food: Red bean jam-filled buns
- Voiced by: Yoshiko Kamei (Japanese); Tiffany Grant (English)

== Songs ==
Opening theme
"Happy! Smile! Hello!" performed by Atsuko Enomoto (Rinna).
Closing theme
"Jounetsu no Paradise," performed by Asami Sanada (Dejiko), Miyuki Sawashiro (Puchiko), Atsuko Enomoto (Rinna), and Etsuko Kozakura (Meek).

== Volumes ==
Panyo Panyo Di Gi Charat DVDs have been released in DVD format across 4 volumes. Each is named after the sound that the main characters use at the end of their sentences.

1. Panyo Panyo Di Gi Charat - Nyo!
2. Panyo Panyo Di Gi Charat - Nyu!
3. Panyo Panyo Di Gi Charat - Mya!
4. Panyo Panyo Di Gi Charat - Myu!

== Manga ==
A Panyo Panyo Di Gi Charat manga series was written by Hina, published by Shogakukan and was serialized in Ciao (magazine).
