= Di Gi Charat Nyo! =

Television series

デ・ジ・キャラットにょ (De Ji Kyaratto Nyo)
- Genre: Comedy, Science fiction
- Anime television series
- Directed by: Hiroaki Sakurai
- Produced by: Koji Morimoto
- Written by: Mamiko Ikeda
- Music by: Toshio Masuda
- Studio: Madhouse
- Licensed by: NA: Bandai Entertainment (expired)
- Original network: TV Tokyo
- Original run: April 6, 2003 – March 28, 2004
- Episodes: 104 (Japanese); 72 (English)
- icon

Di Gi Charat Nyo! (Japanese: デ・ジ・キャラットにょ, Hepburn: De Ji Kyaratto Nyo) is a Japanese anime adapted from the manga Di Gi Charat. The series features Dejiko and Puchiko, two catgirls who travel to Earth for princess training, where they are accidentally split up. The anime aired from April 6, 2003, and March 28, 2004. Bandai Entertainment licensed the anime in North America.

== Plot ==
Di Gi Charat, or Dejiko for short, is the princess of planet Di Gi Charat. Her lazy behaviour is troublesome for her servants and tutors as she "eye-beams" them as they lecture her. In order to get Dejiko to become a good princess, her mother sends her on a trip to earth for princess training. To prevent Dejiko from coming back too early, her mother only fills their spaceship with enough fuel for a one-way trip. On earth, Dejiko stays with Kiyoshi and Yasushi Omocha in their toy shop, while Puchiko stays at the Ankorodo Cake Shop.

== Concepts ==
Mystery Phones (なぞのケータイ, Nazo no Kētai)

Dejiko and Puchiko have cell phones called Mystery Phones with which they can communicate with other. In Piyoko's debut episode, she wants one and finally gets it in the Christmas episode as a gift from Dejiko.

Princess School (プリンセススクール, Purinsesu Sukūru)

Starting on episode 78 (39 2nd title), there is a "princess school" where the main characters have classes, and Dejiko's mother is the principal. There is also a cheerleader club led by Usada. Teachers are Usada Akari, Subarashī-nin (Abarenbō), Kareida, and Yurei's Bāya.

== Characters ==
Dejiko

Dejiko (でじこ)

- Real name: Di Gi Charat (デ・ジ・キャラット De Ji Kyaratto)
- Age: 10
- Suffix: nyo (にょ)
- Special ability: Eye Beam (目からビーム Me kara Bīmu)
- Voiced by: Asami Sanada (Japanese); Chris Simms (English)

Dejiko, also known as Di Gi Charat or Chocola / Chocolat, is the Royal Princess of Planet Di Gi Charat. She was sent to Earth for Princess Training. She is characteristically lazy and stays at "Super Omo-chan" Toy Store.

Puchiko

Puchiko (ぷちこ)

- Real name: Petit Charat (プチ・キャラット Puchi Kyaratto) / Tiger Charat
- Age: 5
- Suffix: nyu (にゅ)
- Special ability: Eye Beam in training (トレーニングに目からビーム Torēningu ni Me kara Bīmu)
- Voiced by: Miyuki Sawashiro (Japanese); Mariette Sluyter (English)

Puchiko, also known as Petit Charat or Cappuchino, is Dejiko's assistant. A tiger girl, She also came to Earth for Princess Training and stays at "Ankorodo" confectionist. She is usually quiet, but sharp-tongued.

Rabi

Rabi~en~Rose (ラ・ビ・アン・ローズ Ra-bi-an-Rōzu) / La Vie en Rose

- Real name: Hikaru Usada (ヒカルうさだ)
- Age: 14
- Special Ability: Rabbit Ears Proppela (ウサ耳プロペラ Usa Mimi Puropera)
- Voiced by: Kyoko Hikami (Japanese); Carol-Anne Day (English)

Hikaru is a 14-year-old junior student, who has a crush on Omocha Kiyoshi. She transforms into Rabi~En~Rose, which is just a change of clothes and rabbit ears that she carries around. She wants to be a famous idol like Akari. She lives at "Charisma", her father's beauty salon. She spends time giving away tissues on the street to promote the beauty salon and to train as a future idol. Her name is probably a parody of the Japanese singer, Hikaru Utada.

Gema (ゲマ)

- Suffix: gema (げま)
- Voiced by: Yoshiko Kamei (Japanese); Lucas Gilbertson (English)

Gema is a floating yellow ball who looks after Dejiko. He is always being attacked by Dejiko's Eye-Beam, sometimes just for annoying her.

=== Dejiko's friends ===
Akari Usada (あかりうさだ)

- Age: 17
- Voiced by: Yuka Iguchi (Japanese); Angie Beers (English)

Akari is a famous idol and Hikaru's cousin. She's very nice and likeable. She becomes a teacher at the Princess School in the second season of the series, but doesn't teach much because of her busy schedule.

Chibi Akari (ちびあかり)

- Age: 8
- Voiced by: Tomoko Kawakami

Chibi Akari is a girl who was trained to be the imposter of Akari Usada.

Rinna Charat (リンナ・キャラット Rinna Kyaratto)

- Age: 10
- Suffix: myu (みゅ)
- Voiced by: Atsuko Enomoto (Japanese); Maizun Jayoussi (English)

Rinna is not related to Dejiko or Puchiko but is from their planet. She is good at cooking, but falls asleep easily. Not an original Di Gi Charat character, instead she originated from "Panyo Panyo Di Gi Charat". Alternative names: Linna, Lina, Rina.

Mike Charat (ミ・ケ・キャラット Mi Ke Kyaratto)

- Age: 10
- Suffix: mya (みゃ)
- Voiced by: Etsuko Kozakura

Mike is not related with Puchiko or Dejiko, but is from their planet. She is good at fishing and is constantly looking for the "legendary fishing rod". Not an original Di Gi Charat character, instead she originated from "Panyo Panyo Di Gi Charat". Alternative names: Mi Ke (pronunciate MEE-ké), Meek.

Yu-Rei (幽霊 Yūrei)

- Age: 10
- Voiced by: Kaori Nazuka (Japanese); Angie Beers (English)

Yu-Rei is a scary girl who lives in a haunted house. Everyone is a little afraid of her, and she feels very insulted by this. To make matters worse, she is allergic to the sun, which forces her to use a protective suit that looks like a ghost costume when she is outdoors. Yu-Rei has a very scary face that she sometimes uses. Her name is a homophone for the Japanese word for ghost.

Aqua (アクア Akua)

- Age: Over 120
- Voiced by: Shion Hirota

Aqua is a mermaid that Dejiko caught while she was fishing. She's pretty and very nice, but very old, and can probably live forever. She can't walk on land, so she travels around on a skateboard. She has an ability to become bigger.

=== Black Gema Gema Gang ===
Piyoko (ぴよこ)

- Real name: Pyocola Analogue III (ピョコラ=アナローグIII世 Pyokora-Anarōgu San-sei)
- Age: 8
- Suffix: pyo (ぴょ)
- Special ability: Mouth Bazooka (口からバズーカ Kuchi kara Bazūka)
- Voiced by: Megumi Hayashibara

Piyoko is from Planet Analogue, Dejiko's rival planet, and came to earth to kidnap Dejiko. She is very poor and often eats only herbs from around her spaceship. She is watched over by Coo, Ky, and Rik; together they call themselves the Black Gema Gema Dan (Gang).

Rik Heisenberg (リク=ハイゼンベルク Riku-Haizenberuku)

- Age: 26
- Voiced by: Kohsuke Toriumi

Part of the Black Gema Gema Gang. He is a Veterinarian and loves animals. He acts as Piyoko's father.

Ky Schweitzer (カイ=シュヴァイツァー Kai-Shuvaitsā)

- Age: 17
- Voiced by: Chihiro Suzuki

Part of the Black Gema Gema Gang. He is a dentist, and usually helps people with their teeth. He acts as Piyoko's mother.

Coo Erhard (クウ=エアハルト Kuu-Eaharuto)

- Age: 13
- Voiced by: Tomo Saeki (Japanese); Cole Howard (English)

Part of the Black Gema Gema Gang. He is a doctor, but that doesn't matter much. Coo has a crush on Piyoko. He acts as Piyoko's pet.

=== Lucky Cat (Maneki Neko) Shopping District residents ===
Yasushi Omocha (やすし面茶)

- Age: 24
- Voiced by: Kenji Nojima (Japanese); Scott Roberts (English)

The owner of "Super Omo-chan" the toy store where Dejiko stays on earth. He is always building useless toys that often destroy parts of the store. He has a particular obsession with Puchiko.

Kiyoshi Omocha (きよし面茶)

- Age: 14
- Voiced by: Omi Minami (Japanese); Sean Broadhurst (English)

Yasushi's brother. He goes to the same school as Hikaru—Bobo Junior High School (ボーボー中学 Bōbō Chūgaku).

Daifuku Ankoro (大福庵衣)

- Voiced by: Masami Kikuchi (Japanese); Michael Shephard (English)

Owner of Ankorodo, the traditional Japanese style bakery where Puchiko stays at on Earth. He is a master player of the "magic string". He is very competitive competing against Gema using the string and against Rinna to find who the best baker is. (Rinna falls asleep and forgets about the competition).

Kinako Ankoro (きなこ庵衣)

- Voiced by: Mika Kanai (Japanese); Linda Zbryski (English)

Daifuku's wife, she is a very calm person and often enjoys a cup of tea while everyone else is fighting. She is very skilled at juggling. Loves Puchiko as if she were her granddaughter, she is often worrying about her whereabouts.

Michelle Usada (ミッシェルうさだ Misheru Usada)

- Voiced by: Kazuya Ichijō (Japanese); Roger Rhodes (English)

Hikaru's father. He has a nose mustache and working clothes. He had gained a reputation as a big spender. Although it was a long time ago, in the Lucky Cat Shopping District which is pedestrian paradise. He has good sense with it, such as pushing a motorbike and walking.

Françoise Usada (フランソワうさだ Furansowa Usada)

- Voiced by: Akemi Okamura (Japanese); Onalea Gilbertson (English)

Hikaru's mother. A slightly excessive fashion designer. She has a little provincial accent by the half of Japanese and French descendant. She is married to Michelle and had gained a reputation as a big spender considerably in a similar manner a long time ago.

Hokke Mirin (ほっけみりん)
Hokke Mirin is a female cat whom Puchiko is taking care of. Living at Manmaru Shrine, Hokke Mirin has five kittens named: Sa (さ), Shi (し), Su (す), Se (せ) and So (そ). The father of the kittens is the translucent cat Jelly Joe (ゼリー・ジョー Zerī-Jō).

Majin Gappa (まじんがっぱ)
Majin Gappa is a kappa whom Rabi~en~Rose is taking care of. He lives in the pond of the Manmaru Shrine. His special abilities are tricks with water.

=== Di Gi Charat Planet ===
Di Gi Charat Mama (デ・ジ・キャラットママ De Ji Kyaratto Mama)

- Voiced by: Noriko Hidaka (Japanese); Elinor Holt (English)

She is the mother of Dejiko and she is the Queen of Di Gi Charat Planet. She doesn't talk too much with Dejiko.

Di Gi Charat Papa (デ・ジ・キャラットパパ De Ji Kyaratto Papa)
He is the father of Dejiko and he is the King of Di Gi Charat Planet. His face is not shown without knowing why. The Queen was touched off by having acted as the principal at the Princess School. He asked Yasushi, and made the Prince School open. Of course, the principal is the King. To Dejiko, it is sweet and feels indebted to a Queen.

Hitsu-G (ひつ・ジー Hitsu-Jī)

- Voiced by: Yūichi Nagashima

He is a worker from Di Gi Charat Castle. He is sheep-man and more like stay in Princess School.

Victoria Elizabeth (ビクトリア・エリザベス Bikutoria Erizabesu)

- Voiced by: Saori Goto

She is a worker from Di Gi Charat Castle. She more active in Di Gi Charat Castle than in Princess School.

== Music ==
The opening theme "Heartbeat" is a translation to Japanese of the Swedish entry to the Eurovision Song Contest 2001 Listen to Your Heartbeat. The ending theme "Equal Romance" is a cover version of the same song by CoCo, which was the second ending theme of Ranma 1/2.

Opening

1. "Heartbeat" by Prière
2. "Dynamite I.N.G (ダイナマイト★I・N・G)" by Asami Sanada, Miyuki Sawashiro, and Kyoko Hikami
3. "Miracle Wonderland (ミラクル☆ワンダーランド)" by Asami Sanada, Miyuki Sawashiro, and Kyoko Hikami

Ending

1. "Equal Romance" by Prière
2. "Di Gi Charat Ondo (デ・ジ・キャラット音頭)" by Asami Sanada, Miyuki Sawashiro, Kyoko Hikami, and Yoshiko Kamei
3. "PARTY☆NIGHT -Cyber Trance Version-" by Asami Sanada, Miyuki Sawashiro, Kyoko Hikami, and Yuka Iguchi
4. "PARTY☆NIGHT -Cyber X'mas Version-" by Asami Sanada, Miyuki Sawashiro, Kyoko Hikami, and Yuka Iguchi
5. "Daisuki (ダイスキ)" by Asami Sanada, Miyuki Sawashiro, and Kyoko Hikami

== Licensing ==
Bandai Entertainment released nine volumes, each of them containing eight episodes. So far, 72 episodes have been dubbed.

== Media ==
=== Anime ===
104 12-minute episodes were produced by Madhouse and aired as fifty-two episodes between April 6, 2003, and March 28, 2004, on TV Tokyo. Hiroaki Sakurai, director of the original series, returned as the director, Mamiko Ikeda is in charge of the script, Toshio Masuda with the Music, and Yoshinobu Yamakawa with the character design. Di Gi Charat Nyo! was licensed by Bandai Entertainment in North America.
