= Glove on Fight =

2002 video game

- Developer: Watanabe Seisakujo
- Publisher: Watanabe Seisakujo
- Platform: Windows 98/ME/2000/XP
- Release: May 12, 2002
- Genre: Versus fighting game
- Modes: Single-player, multiplayer

Glove on Fight (グローブオンファイト, Gurōbu on Faito) is a doujin boxing video game released at the Comic Revolution 31 convention in May 2002 by Watanabe Seisakujo (now French-Bread). The name of the game is a take on "Groove on Fight", part of the Power Instinct series of fighting games, though other than that the two games have very little in common. The game was developed to test routines that the programmer would use in Melty Blood.

== Characters ==
The game features characters from various sources, including anime, dating sims, other doujin, and a company mascot. When the game is played for the first time, only five characters are available. Three more will be unlocked when the player progresses through the game (which are the three last opponents in the game), making a total of eight playable characters.

- Akiko Minase (Note: Unlockable character) (Kanon)
- Ayaka Kurusugawa (To Heart)
- Ayu Tsukimiya (Kanon)
- Ciel (Tsukihime)
- Dejiko (Di Gi Charat)
- Ecoco (Tohoku Electric Power)
- Satsuki Yumizuka (Tsukihime)
- Seika Mori (Gunparade March)

There were two Flash videos by the character designer of this game and Ragnarok Battle Offline, Harukaze Namikai (南向春風) of Shun-Pu Tei-Ko-Bo (春風亭工房). They were called "Glove on Fight" and "Glove on Fight 2".

== Sequel ==
A sequel to Glove on Fight called Glove on Fight 2: Gleam of Force (小鳩ヶ丘高校女子ぐろー部 Gleam of Force) was released on August 16, 2008.
