= Satoko Kiyuduki =

Japanese manga artist and illustrator

Satoko Kiyuduki (きゆづき さとこ) is a Japanese manga artist and illustrator from Fukui Prefecture. She is best known for her work on the Dept. Heaven series of games and her yonkoma manga GA Geijutsuka Art Design Class and Shoulder-a-Coffin Kuro.

== Works ==
=== Manga ===
- GA Geijutsuka Art Design Class
- Shoulder-a-Coffin Kuro

=== Games ===
- Dept. Heaven series
  - Yggdra Union: We'll Never Fight Alone
  - Yggdra Unison
  - Gungnir
  - Knights in the Nightmare
