= Panic × Panic =

Japanese manga series

- Cover of the first Japanese volume of Panic x Panic

ぱにっく×ぱにっく (Paniku × Paniku)
- Manga
- Written by: Mika Kawamura
- Published by: Kodansha
- English publisher: Del Rey Manga
- Magazine: Nakayoshi
- Published: 2005
- Volumes: 2

Panic × Panic (Japanese: ぱにっく×ぱにっく, Hepburn: Paniku × Paniku) is a shōjo manga by Mika Kawamura, published in Kodansha's Nakayoshi and collected into two volumes. It is licensed in English by Del Rey Manga.

== Reception ==
Matthew Warner of Mania Entertainment felt the first volume was generic, feeling as if he had read the story before, and criticised the second volume for becoming "insultingly stupid". Rachel Bentham of Active Anime praises the strong first volume, but feels the story ends too soon in the second volume. Carlo Santos of Anime News Network felt that the second volume is too simple, and that while some individual images are cute, the readability is marred by "cluttered screentone effects, unconvincing action poses, and characters standing around awkwardly".
