= Juuni Senshi Bakuretsu Eto Ranger =

Japanese anime television series

十二戦支 爆烈エトレンジャー (Jūni Senshi Bakuretsu Etorenjā)
- Genre: Fantasy, comedy
- Created by: Kimio Ikeda
- Anime television series
- Directed by: Kunitoshi Okajima
- Produced by: Kimio Ikeda; Hiroshi Wakao
- Written by: Mayori Sekijima
- Music by: Takeshi Ike; Osamu Totsuka
- Studio: Shaft; Studio Bones
- Original network: NHK
- Original run: April 7, 1995 – January 26, 1996
- Episodes: 39

Juuni Senshi Bakuretsu Eto Ranger (Japanese: 十二戦支 爆烈エトレンジャー, Hepburn: Jūni Senshi Bakuretsu Etorenjā) is a 1995 Japanese anime television series by Shaft.

== Plot ==
The series takes place on Mugen, an island ruled by Princess Aura, who derives her power from the Great God Goal, but is forbidden from leaving the island. Mugen floats over the ocean and is tethered to the sky by the Novel Pole, which holds the Novel Worlds: worlds based on stories created by the human imagination, such as folk tales, fairy tales, and literature. The protagonists are the Eto Rangers, anthropomorphic animals representing the twelve animals of the Chinese zodiac. Their nemesis is Nyanma, the forgotten Spirit of the Cats who was once known as Chocolat. She resents Aura for excluding her from the role of Ranger and seeks revenge by distorting Novel Worlds with Jyarei Monsters.

To return the Novel Worlds to normal, the Rangers travel aboard Kirinda to the Novel Worlds where they uncover the Jyarei Monster and purify it with Bakumaru's mirror.

== Characters ==
=== Eto Rangers ===
Bakumaru (バク丸, Bakumaru) (Rat)
Voiced by: Chika Sakamoto
The Spirit of the Mice and leader of the Rangers, who has a crush on Cream. He is afraid of cats, which he eventually overcomes with help from Gaō. He wields a saber, which he receives while in Momotaro's world, and the revealing mirror, which can unmask Jyarei Monsters.
Hols (ホルス, Horusu) (Ox)
Voiced by: Toshiyuki Morikawa
The Spirit of the Bulls, who transforms into a fierce bull when he sees anything red.
Gaō (ガオウ, Gaō) (Tiger)
Voiced by: Mitsuaki Hoshino
The Spirit of the Tigers, who can transform into a giant tiger by putting on his special pair of shades and shouting "Tora Tora Hai!". He helps Bakumaru overcome his fear of cats. He was in a relationship with Chocolat prior to becoming an Eto Ranger.
Cream (クリーム, Kuriimu) (Rabbit)
Voiced by: Kyōko Hikami
The Spirit of the Rabbits, who has a crush on Bakumaru. She has enhanced hearing, and her magical carrot-shaped wand can change her or her teammate's costumes.
Drago (ドラゴ, Dorago) (Dragon)
Voiced by: Jin Yamanoi
The Spirit of the Dragons. He rides on a white cloud and can transform into a giant dragon by counting to three in Mandarin and activating his crystal ball. While in this form, he can conjure hurricanes with his wings. He can also command weather and has various breath powers.
Nyorori (ニョロリ, Nyorori) (Snake)
Voiced by: Rokurō Naya
The Spirit of the Snakes, who has telekinetic powers. He is wise and cunning.
Pakaracchi (パカラッチ, Pakaracchi) (Horse)
Voiced by: Takashi Nagasako
The Spirit of the Horses, who wields the Horse Shoe Boomerang. He is enthusiastic and is implied to have a crush on Souffle.
Souffle (スフレ, Sufure) (Goat)
Voiced by: Yūko Miyamura
The Spirit of the Sheep, whose magical compact can detect metallic materials. She is implied to have a crush on Pakaracchi.
Monk (モンク, Monku) (Monkey)
Voiced by: Yoshiko Kamei
The Spirit of the Monkeys, who is fun-loving and silly, but does not get along with Pochiro. He is agile and skilled at imitating voices and scratching his enemies. He owns the Monkey See Monkey Do Voice Recorder.
Tart (タルト, Taruto) (Rooster)
Voiced by: Maria Kawamura
The Spirit of the Chickens, whose chicklet timer allows her to transform into a more human form. After Gaō sacrifices himself for her, she develops feelings for him.
Pochirō (ポチ郎, Pochirō) (Dog)
Voiced by: Toshiyuki Morikawa
The Spirit of the Dogs. He values honor, but can be hot-headed, which causes fights between him and Monk. He wields a bone-shaped stick that can stretch.
Urii (ウリィ, Urii) (Pig)
Voiced by: Yōko Sōmi
The Spirit of the Pigs, who is the youngest member of the Rangers. He releases a powerful energy burst whenever he cries.

=== Others ===
Princess Aura (オーラ姫, Oora-hime)
Voiced by: Maria Kawamura
The ruler of Mugen and mentor of the Eto Rangers. She has light powers, which she derives from her master, the Great God Goal and speaks for him.
Lydia (リディア, Lideia)
Voiced by: Rokurō Naya
A photojournalist and reporter of Mugen Times, who is a friend of Aura. After witnessing Chocolat's transformation into Nyanma, he was attacked and mortally injured, after which his soul was transferred into Kirinda.
Kirinda (キリンダー, Kirinda)
Voiced by: Rokurō Naya
A giant mechanical pegasus, which the Rangers use as their transport. When the Rangers defeat a Jyarei Monster, Bakumaru summons him to "purify" the monster and return a Novel World to normal.
Great God Goal (大霊神ゴール, Dairei Shin Gooru)
Voiced by: Tamio Ōki

=== Evil-Spirited Monsters ===
- Nyanma (ニャンマー, Nyanmaa)

Voiced by: Yōko Sōmi
The queen of the Jyarei Monsters. She was once Chocolat (ショコラ, Shokora), the Spirit of the Cats, who was excluded from the role of Ranger. Afterwards, she became Nyanma after Bagi exploited her grudge against Aura to manipulate her. She seeks revenge by using Jyarei Monsters to destroy the Novel Worlds. As Chocolat, she was in a relationship with Gaō.

- Gōsen (ゴウセン, Gōsen)

Voiced by: Mitsuaki Hoshino

- Gen'en (ゲンエン, Gen'en)

Voiced by: Yoshiko Kamei

- Rōran (ロウラン, Rōran)

Voiced by: Takashi Nagasako

- Juken (珠献, Jyuken)

Voiced by: Kyōko Hikami

- Jyarei God Bagi (邪霊神バギ, Jyarei Shin Bagi)

Voiced by: Ikuko Tani
Nyanma's master and the Jyarei Monsters' leader. It is the true antagonist of the series, who manipulated her into becoming Nyanma. It attempts to destroy the Novel Worlds, but is destroyed by the Rangers.

== Production ==
The series was produced by Shaft, with Kunitoshi Okajima as chief director, Mayori Sekijima as series composition writer, Takeshi Ike and Osamu Totsuka as composers, and Noritaka Suzuki as character designer. Several episodes were outsourced outside of Shaft: Big Bang handled episodes 3, 7, 15, and 21; Office AO handled episodes 9, 14, 20, 25, 31, 36; San Kikaku handled episodes 11 and 17; and Samtack handled episodes 24, 29, 35.

=== Episodes ===
No.	Title	Directed by (Note: Information is taken from the ending credits of each episode.)	Written by	Storyboarded by	Original release date
1	"Does Such an Adventure Exist~?"; Transliteration: "Kon'na bōken ari i ~?" (Japanese: こんな冒険ありぃ~?)	Kunitoshi Okajima	Mayori Sekijima	Shingo Kaneko	April 7, 1995
2	"Defeat the Jyarei Monster"; Transliteration: "Taose Yokoshima Rei Monsutā" (Japanese: 倒せ邪霊モンスター)	Kunitoshi Okajima	Mayori Sekijima	Shingo Kaneko	April 14, 1995
3	"Cinderella at 12:05AM"; Transliteration: "Rei-ji Gobu no Shinderera" (Japanese: 〇時五分のシンデレラ)	Shinichirou Aoki	Hiroyuki Kawasaki	Osamu Inoue	April 21, 1995
4	"Sorry Rabbit, It's the Tortoise"; Transliteration: "Usagi Shitsurei, Kame Shimahen" (Japanese: ウサギ失礼, カメしまへん)	Hiroshi Kurimoto	Kuniaki Yamashita	Takaaki Ishiyama	April 28, 1995
5	"Ostrich Is the Son of Duck?"; Transliteration: "Ahiru no Ko wa Dachō?" (Japanese: アヒルの子はダチョウ?)	Masahiko Murata	Kuniaki Yamashita	Takaaki Ishiyama	May 5, 1995
6	"Duel! At the Western "Journey to the West""; Transliteration: "Kettō! U~esutan de Saiyūki" (Japanese: 決闘! ウェスタンで西遊記)	Osamu Inoue	Masashi Kubota	Osamu Inoue	May 12, 1995
7	"Shop's Opening Today? In Search of Princess Kaguya"; Transliteration: "Honjitsu Kaiten? Kaguyahime wo Sagase" (Japanese: 本日開店? かぐや姫をさがせ)	Shinichirou Aoki	Yoshimichi Hosoi	Shinichirou Aoki	May 19, 1995
8	"Watch Out for Red Riding Hood"; Transliteration: "Akazukin-chan no Ki wo Tsukete" (Japanese: 赤頭巾ちゃんに気をつけて)	Toshimasa Suzuki	Kuniaki Yamashita	Shinichi Watanabe	May 26, 1995
9	"Land of Surprise Beanstalk Giants!"; Transliteration: "Odoroki Mame no Ki Kyojin no Kuni!" (Japanese: おどろき豆の木巨人の国!)	Masahito Otani	Kuniaki Yamashita	Tsutomu Yabuki	June 2, 1995
10	"Pinocchio: Golden Days!?"; Transliteration: "Pinokio Kogane no Hibi!?" (Japanese: ピノキオ・黄金の日々!?)	Takashi Asami	Masaharu Amiya	Takashi Asami	June 9, 1995
11	"Snow White's Apple Panic!"; Transliteration: "Shirayukihime no Appurupanikku!" (Japanese: 白雪姫のアップルパニック!)	Kazuya Miyazaki	Masashi Kubota	Hiroshi Kurimoto	June 16, 1995
12	"The Challenge of King Jyarei Nyanma"; Transliteration: "Yokoshima Rei-ō Nyanmā no Chōsen" (Japanese: 邪霊王ニャンマーの挑戦)	Osamu Inoue	Hiroyuki Kawasaki	Osamu Inoue	June 23, 1995
13	"Big Pinch Here and There!"; Transliteration: "Atchi de Kotchi de Dai Pinchi!" (Japanese: あっちでこっちで大ピンチ!)	Masahiko Murata	Hiroyuki Kawasaki	Takaaki Ishiyama	June 30, 1995
14	"The Exchange Battle of the Straw Millionaire"; Transliteration: "Warashibe Chōja no Kōkan Gassen!" (Japanese: わらしべ長者の交換合戦!)	Masahito Otani	Yoshimichi Hosoi	Toshiaki Komura	July 7, 1995
15	"What?! Peter Pan Can't Fly?!"; Transliteration: "E~tsu? Tobenai Pītā Pan" (Japanese: えっ? 飛べないピーターパン)	Hideki Tonokatsu	Kuniaki Yamashita	Kazuhito Kikuchi	July 14, 1995
16	"Great Martial Arts Tournament! Bakumaru got Married?"; Transliteration: "Dai Bujutsu Taikai! Baku Maru ga Kekkon?" (Japanese: 大武術大会! バク丸が結婚?)	Osamu Inoue	Yoshimichi Hosoi	Hideki Tonokatsu	July 21, 1995
17	"Old Aladdin and the Magic Lamp"; Transliteration: "Arajin Jīsan to Mahōnoranpu" (Japanese: アラジンじいさんと魔法のランプ)	Kazuya Miyazaki	Nobuaki Kishima	Tomonori Kogawa	July 28, 1995
18	"Fierce! XX's Repayment"; Transliteration: "Sōzetsu! × × No Ongaeshi" (Japanese: 壮絶! ××の恩返し)	Hiroshi Kurimoto	Masashi Kubota	Takaaki Ishiyama	August 4, 1995
19	"House of Strange Sweets"; Transliteration: "Okashina Okashina Okashi no wo Uchi" (Japanese: オカシなオカシなおかしのおうち)	Takashi Asami	Masaharu Amiya	Takashi Asami	August 11, 1995
20	"Conspiracy of the Cat in Boots"; Transliteration: "Nagagutsuwohaitaneko no Inbō" (Japanese: 長靴をはいた猫の陰謀)	Masahito Otani	Kuniaki Yamashita	Toshiaki Komura	August 18, 1995
21	"Revive Bakumaru!"; Transliteration: "Yomigaere Bakumaru!" (Japanese: よみがえれバク丸!)	Susumu Ishizaki	Kuniaki Yamashita	Shinichirou Aoki	August 25, 1995
22	"Power Up! Newkillinder!"; Transliteration: "Pawāappu! Nyūkirindā" (Japanese: パワーアップ! ニューキリンダー)	Osamu Inoue	Nobuaki Kishima	Osamu Inoue	September 1, 1995
23	"Blue Bird's Tart?"; Transliteration: "Aoi Tori no Taruto?" (Japanese: 青い鳥のタルト?)	Toshimasa Suzuki	Yoshimichi Hosoi	Hideki Tonokatsu	September 8, 1995
24	"Get Your Gun, Soufflé!"; Transliteration: "Sufure yo Jū wo Tore!" (Japanese: スフレよ銃をとれ!)	Hideki Tonokatsu	Masashi Kubota	Shinichi Watanabe	September 15, 1995
25	"Broadway's Little Mermaid"; Transliteration: "Burōdou~ei no Ningyo-hime" (Japanese: ブロードウェイの人魚姫)	Masahito Otani	Hiroyuki Kawasaki	Toshiaki Komura	September 22, 1995
26	(Japanese: 金? のォ! おォのォ!)	Takashi Asami	Kuniaki Yamashita	Takaaki Ishiyama	September 29, 1995
27	(Japanese: 砂漠の白い悪魔)	Osamu Inoue	Nobuaki Kishima	Shingo Kaneko; Mamoru Hosoda	October 6, 1995
28	(Japanese: モンク抹殺!? さるかに合戦!)	Hiroshi Kurimoto	Yoshimichi Hosoi	Gorō Taniguchi	October 13, 1995
29	(Japanese: 愛と青春のパカラッチ)	Hideki Tonokatsu	Masashi Kubota	Takaaki Ishiyama	October 27, 1995
30	(Japanese: 想い出のバースディ・プレゼント)	Toshimasa Suzuki	Kuniaki Yamashita	Toshimasa Suzuki	November 3, 1995
31	(Japanese: 大ピンチ! ニャンマーの罠)	Masahito Otani	Yuuichirou Takeda	Toshiaki Komura	November 10, 1995
32	(Japanese: 失われた記憶をとりもどせ)	Takashi Asami	Yuuichirou Takeda	Takashi Asami	November 17, 1995
33	(Japanese: 哀しきニャンマーの過去)	Shinichi Watanabe	Kuniaki Yamashita	Mamoru Hosoda	November 24, 1995
34	(Japanese: 衝撃! キリンダー誕生の秘密)	Hiroshi Kurimoto	Kuniaki Yamashita	Takaaki Ishiyama	December 8, 1995
35	(Japanese: 最終決戦! 邪霊城へ突入せよ!!)	Gorō Taniguchi	Masashi Kubota	Takaaki Ishiyama	December 15, 1995
36	(Japanese: はなて! 十二戦支合体光線)	Masahito Otani	Yoshimichi Hosoi	Masahito Otani	December 22, 1995
37	(Japanese: めざめよ珠献!)	Takashi Asami	Masaharu Amiya	Mamoru Hosoda	January 12, 1996
38	(Japanese: 怒りと憎しみのはてに)	Toshimasa Suzuki	Kuniaki Yamashita	Toshimasa Suzuki	January 19, 1996
39	(Japanese: いつだってキミに会える)	Kunitoshi Okajima	Mayori Sekijima	Kunitoshi Okajima	January 26, 1996

== Legacy ==
In 2020, the Eto Rangers appeared in a collaboration with Korean mobile RPG Crusaders Quest.
