= Hiroaki Sakurai =

Japanese anime director and bassist (born 1958)

- 桜井 弘明
- Born: December 15, 1958 (age 67); Numazu, Shizuoka Prefecture, Japan
- Occupations: Animation director, bassist
- Spouse: Sayuri Ōba

Hiroaki Sakurai (桜井 弘明, Sakurai Hiroaki; born December 15, 1958) is a Japanese anime director and bassist who is known for his work with the Di Gi Charat series and UFO Baby. He has served as the director for series such as Nanaka 6/17, Cromartie High School, Les Misérables: Shōjo Cosette, GA Geijutsuka Art Design Class, Maid Sama!, Nekogami Yaoyorozu, Jewelpet Happiness, The Disastrous Life of Saiki K., and The Demon Girl Next Door. He is married to Sayuri Ōba, an anime screenwriter.

== Career ==
Sakurai was in college for 5 and a half years and spent his time playing in bands and bassist auditions. One day, he suddenly became interested in animation, and after graduating from the department of literature and science at Nihon University, he worked at Yoyogi Animation Academy and joined Studio World, which was looking for assistant directors, at the age of 25. The first work he was involved in as an assistant director was Super Dimension Cavalry Southern Cross, and the first time his name appeared in the credits was in Yoroshiku Mechadock. When he was in charge of Mechadock, Masayuki Kojima and Ken Baba served as his seniors. In the spring of 1988, Studio World disbanded and Sakurai moved to Film Magic, which was founded by Baba. In the middle of Akazukin Chacha, Film Magic went bankrupt due to reasons mentioned below, and after that he went freelance.

== Style ==
According to Hatsuki Tsuji, Sakurai is described as someone who has good qualities, but who can be conceited. He often uses voice actors such as Mika Kanai and Kaori Nazuka in his directorial projects.

Inspired by the direction of Akitaro Daichi and Tatsuo Sato, who were part of Akazukin Chacha's rotation of directors, Sakurai was too elaborate in his direction and was unable to adhere to the limited number of sheets, resulting in constant deficits and driving Film Magic into bankruptcy. However, Takaaki Wada, who was in charge of key animation in certain episodes, claims that Sakurai, Wada and the other animators ignored the president's advice and got carried away, and that the bankruptcy was their own fault.

Sakurai is known for his love of the ukulele and for carrying one with him at all times, even to the studios. In addition, the soundtrack for Cromartie High School features music by the progressive rock band Bi Kyo Ran, who are from the same town as him and of whom he was a fan for many years, and also worked with the band as a bassist, later becoming a full member. He also played bass in the opening song "Dynamite★I-N-G" for TV Tokyo's Di Gi Charat Nyo! and performed a solo part. He stated that he had nine left-handed basses at the time.

== Filmography ==
=== Anime ===
Year	Title	Crew role	Notes	Source
1990	Hidari no O'Clock!! (ja:左のオクロック!!)	Director		
1990–91	Tanken Goblin Shima (ja:たんけん ゴブリン島)	Director, Storyboard		
1996–98	Kodocha	Assistant director		
1998	Sexy Commando Gaiden: Sugoi yo!! Masaru-san	Assistant director		
1999	Jubei-chan: The Ninja Girl	Assistant director		
1999–present	Di Gi Charat	Series director, episode director and writer	Also specials and OVAs	
2000–02	UFO Baby	Director		
2001–02	PaRappa the Rapper	Director		
2002	Baboo Factory バブーファクトリー［第2期］	Director		
2003	Nanaka 6/17	Director		
2003	Di Gi Charat Nyo!	Director		
2003–04	Cromartie High School	Director		
2004	Sweet Valerian	Director		
2005	Majokko Tsukune-chan	Director	OVA series	
2006	Winter Garden	Screenplay, Director		
2007	Les Misérables: Shōjo Cosette	Director		
2007	Chopper Man	Director	Also specials and OVAs	
2009	GA Geijutsuka Art Design Class	Director	Also OVA in 2010	
2010	Maid Sama!	Director	Also OVAs	
2011	Nekogami Yaoyorozu	Director	Also OVA	
2013–14	Jewelpet Happiness	Director		
2016–19	The Disastrous Life of Saiki K.	Director	Also Special & ONA	
2019–22	The Demon Girl Next Door	Director		
2020–22	Mewkledreamy	Director	Also Mix! in 2021	
2022	Reiwa no Di Gi Charat	Director		
2025	The Dark History of the Reincarnated Villainess	Director		
2027	Multi-Mind Mayhem	Director		
2027	SSS-Class Revival Hunter	Director		

=== Film ===
Year	Title	Crew role	Notes	Source
1999	Cyber Team in Akihabara: Summer Vacation of 2011	Director	Solo directorial debut	
2012	Jewelpet the Movie: Sweets Dance Princess	Director		
2016	Gekijōban Tantei Opera Milky Holmes ~Gyakushū no Milky Holmes~	Director		
