= UFO Baby =

2000 television anime

- Cover of the first volume of the manga, published by Kodansha

だぁ!だぁ!だぁ! (Daa! Daa! Daa!)
- Manga
- Written by: Mika Kawamura
- Published by: Kodansha
- Magazine: Nakayoshi
- Original run: February 1998 – March 2002
- Volumes: 9
- Anime television series
- Directed by: Hiroaki Sakurai
- Produced by: Eizō Kondō
- Written by: Tomoko Konparu
- Music by: Toshio Masuda
- Studio: J.C.Staff
- Original network: NHK-BS2
- Original run: March 28, 2000 – February 26, 2002
- Episodes: 78
- Manga

Shin Daa! Daa! Daa!
- Written by: Mika Kawamura
- Published by: Kodansha
- Magazine: Nakayoshi
- Original run: April 2, 2002 – December 28, 2002
- Volumes: 2

UFO Baby (だぁ!だぁ!だぁ!, Dā! Dā! Dā!) is a Japanese manga series written and illustrated by Mika Kawamura. The manga was serialized by Kodansha in Nakayoshi from February 1998 to March 2002, and the chapters were collected into nine tankōbon volumes. It was adapted into a 78-episode anime television series produced by NHK, animated by J.C.Staff, and directed by Hiroaki Sakurai, which was broadcast between March 2000 and February 2002 on NHK's BS2 broadcast satellite network. The series was one of the top-rated anime series during its initial broadcast.

The story follows two junior high school students, Miyu and Kanata, who find and care for an abandoned alien baby without discovering that they are living together without adult supervision. The anime adaptation concluded before the manga was completed, resulting in different endings for each series. Kawamura later wrote a sequel to the manga, Shin Dā! Dā! Dā! (新☆だぁ!だぁ!だぁ!).

== Plot ==
Miyu Kouzuki is an eighth grade student whose parents left for the United States to work for NASA. They arrange for her to stay with their long-time family friend, Hōshō Saionji, a monk who lives in an old Buddhist temple on a hill overlooking the town of Heiomachi. Hōshō leaves soon after on a year-long pilgrimage to India, leaving Miyu to stay in his house with his son, Kanata.

Suddenly, a UFO lands in the honden of the temple, containing a humanoid alien baby named Ruu and his catlike guardian, Wannyā. The duo cannot return to their home planet because it is too far from Earth; Wannyā asks Kanata and Miyu to allow them to stay in their house, to which they agree. People from Planet Otto look identical to human beings and Wannyā can also transform into human beings, animals, as well as objects. Ruu begins to think of Miyu and Kanata as his parents.

In Shin Daa! Daa! Daa!, set many years later, Ruu meets a confused earthling girl called Miu that has arrived through a wormhole. Miu desperately wants to go home, and he agrees. Unbeknownst to him, Miu is the daughter of the same people who lovingly cared for him during his stay on Earth, Miyu Kōzuki and Kanata Saionji. They meet Ran, Ruu's best friend, a robot named Ann, and Mininyā, Wannyā's son.

== Characters ==
- Miyu Kozuki (光月 未夢, Kōzuki Miyu)) (Voiced by: Kaori Nazuka) is a beautiful eighth grade girl who has a crush on Kanata.
- Kanata Saionji (西遠寺 彷徨, Saionji Kanata) (Voiced by: Yuko Sanpei) is the male protagonist who is admired for his good-looking appearance and attitude.
- Ruu (ルゥ, Rū)) (Voiced by: Mika Kanai) is an alien baby from Planet Otto who can levitate and perform telekinesis on objects. He is taken care by Miyu and Kanata, thinking of the two students as his parents and often helping them. Ruu uses his abilities at inappropriate times, causing great trouble for Miyu and Kanata.
- Miu Saionji (西遠寺未宇, Saionji Miu) is Kanata and Miyu's 12-year-old daughter who attends Grade 6 of elementary school. She arrives on Planet Otto through a wormhole.
- Wannya (ワンニャー, Wannyā)) (Voiced by: Chiemi Chiba) is a cat-like alien "sitter pet" from Otto entrusted to take care of Ruu.

=== Supporting characters ===
- Christine Hanakomachi (花小町 クリスティーヌ, Hanakomachi Kurisutīnu)) (Voiced by: Haruna Ikezawa) is Miyu and Kanata's wealthy classmate of French descent. Christine is so infatuated with Kanata that she is prone to romantic fantasies about him, and becomes jealous when she sees him with other girls, especially Miyu.
- Momoka Hanakomachi (花小町 ももか, Hanakomachi Momoka) (Voiced by: Chinami Nishimura) is Christine's three-year-old cousin who often rides her tricycle. Momoka is in love with Ruu, declaring him as her boyfriend, going as far as to saying that she wants to marry him.
- Aya Konishi (小西 綾, Konishi Aya) (Voiced by: Atsuko Enomoto) is one of Miyu and Kanata's classmates.
- Nanami Tenchi (天地 ななみ, Tenchi Nanami) (Voiced by: Asako Shirakura) is one of Miyu and Kanata's classmates.
- Santa Kurosu (黒須 三太, Kurosu Santa) (Voiced by: Hikaru Tokita) is Kanata's weird friend who often comes up with strange ideas and loves old recordings. Miyu once thought that Santa had fallen in love with a girl, but later finds out that it was the girl's camera he admired. He first met Kanata through a TV show named Cactus Man (named for the main character), which had low ratings and was cancelled early.
- Nozomu Hikarigaoka (光ヶ丘 望, Hikarigaoka Nozomu) (Voiced by: Taisuke Yamamoto) is Kanata's rival.
- Mikan Yamamura (山村 みかん, Yamamura Mikan) (Voiced by: Mika Kanai) is a budding manga artist who spots a tangerine on her head, as do her relatives, including her pet Scottish Fold cat.
- Miki Kozuki (光月 未来, Kōzuki Miki) (Voiced by: Yuko Minaguchi) is Miyu's astronaut mother who is obsessed with anything connected with outer space. She is hired by NASA with her husband Yū at the beginning of the story and must leave for the United States.
- Yū Kozuki (光月 優, Kōzuki Yū) (Voiced by: Takuma Suzuki) Yū is Miyu's astrophysicist father who helps his wife with her work and is also hired by NASA.
- Hōshō Saionji (西遠寺 宝晶, Saionji Hōshō) (Voiced by: Kenichi Ogata) is Kanata's father who serves as a Buddhist monk, the patriarch of the Saionji household and head priest of its temple. He seems irresponsible, embarking on a pilgrimage to India soon after Miyu arrives at the Saionji household.
- Hitomi Saionji (西遠寺 瞳, Saionji Hitomi) (Voiced by: Sakiko Tamagawa was Kanata's late mother who died when he was a child. Hitomi was close Miyu's mother, Miki.
- Miss Mizuno (水野先生, Mizuno-sensei) (Voiced by: Katsuya Endō) is Miyu and Kanata's class teacher she possesses numerous talents ranging from cooking to ninja training.
- Seiya Yaboshi (夜星 星矢, Yaboshi Seiya) (Voiced by: Asami Sanada) is an alien who visits Earth and takes a liking to Miyu, often shapeshifting as Kanata to get close to her. His kind can read minds through a touch of the hand.
- Rui Yaboshi (夜星 流, Yaboshi Rui)) (Voiced by: Junko Noda) is Seiya's caring older sister who works at the Space Police Force cafeteria.
- Teru Moroboshi (諸星 輝, Teru Moroboshi) (Voiced by: Ryotaro Okiayu) is Rui's boyfriend who works as detective of Space Police Force.
- Principal (校長, Kōchō) (Voiced by: Naoki Bandō: The eccentric principal of Miyu and Kanata's school who is obsessed with monkeys, bananas, and jungle-themed video games.

=== Other characters ===
- Pepo (ペポ) (Voiced by: Ai Tokunaga) is a rabbit-like alien who became Ruu's pet in Shin Daa! Daa! Daa!.
- Waruwaru Dan is a group of sisters who plan on kidnapping Ruu. It consists of Durian (ドリアン, Dorian), Kiwi (キウイ, Kiui), and Guava (グアバ, Guaba).

== Media ==
An anime television series aired between March 28, 2000, and February 26, 2002, on NHK-BS2. It spanned a total of 78 episodes and was directed by Hiroaki Sakurai.
