= Mika Kawamura =

Japanese manga artist (born 1973)

Mika Kawamura during event held in Taipei, 2000.

Mika Kawamura (川村 美香, Kawamura Mika; born August 5, 1973 in Aichi) is a Japanese manga artist and author, best noted for being the creator of the manga series UFO Baby.

== Other works ==
- Daa! Daa! Daa! (|だぁ!だぁ!だぁ!)
- Shin Daa! Daa! Daa! (新☆だぁ!だぁ!だぁ! )
- Happy Ice Cream! (ハッピー アイスクリーム!)
- Awasete Ippon (あわせて い_{つ}ぽん)
- Taiho Shite Mi~na! (タイホしてみーな)
- Panic × Panic (ぱにっく×ぱにっく)
- Annin Musume (杏仁小娘)
- "Awasete Ippon"
