= Di Gi Charat =

Japanese manga and anime series by Koge-Donbo

- Cover of the first anime DVD volume, featuring Dejiko/Digiko (center), Puchiko on top of Gema (left), and Rabi~en~Rose (right)

デ・ジ・キャラット (De Ji Kyaratto)
- Genre: Comedy, science fiction
- Manga

Gema Gema
- Written by: Koge-Donbo
- Published by: Broccoli Books
- Magazine: From GAMERS
- Original run: August 1998 – February 1999
- Audio drama

Dejiko's Room
- Studio: Broccoli
- Station: Radio Osaka
- Original run: October 1999 – September 2001
- Anime television series
- Directed by: Hiroaki Sakurai
- Produced by: Tetsuo Gensho; Yoshiyuki Ochiai
- Written by: Hiroaki Sakurai; Nobuharu Kamanaka
- Studio: Madhouse
- Licensed by: NA: Synch Point (2005-2008) Sentai Filmworks (2013-present)
- Original network: TBS
- Original run: November 29, 1999 – December 23, 1999
- Episodes: 16
- Anime television series

Di Gi Charat – Summer Special 2000
- Directed by: Hiroaki Sakurai
- Studio: Madhouse
- Licensed by: NA: Sentai Filmworks
- Original network: TBS
- Original run: August 22, 2000 – August 23, 2000
- Episodes: 2
- Anime television series

Di Gi Charat – Christmas Special
- Directed by: Hiroaki Sakurai; Wataru Takahashi
- Studio: Madhouse
- Licensed by: NA: Sentai Filmworks
- Original network: TBS
- Original run: December 16, 2000
- Episodes: 1
- Manga

Dejiko's Champion Cup
- Written by: Koge-Donbo
- Published by: Akita Shoten
- Magazine: Weekly Shōnen Champion
- Original run: April 2001 – August 1, 2002
- Volumes: 1
- Anime television series

Di Gi Charat – Ohanami Special
- Directed by: Hiroaki Sakurai
- Written by: Toru Takahashi
- Studio: Madhouse
- Licensed by: NA: Sentai Filmworks
- Original network: TBS
- Original run: April 6, 2001
- Episodes: 4
- Anime television series

Di Gi Charat – Natsuyasumi Special
- Directed by: Hiroaki Sakurai; Toru Takahashi
- Studio: Madhouse
- Licensed by: NA: Sentai Filmworks
- Original network: TBS
- Original run: August 2, 2001 – August 3, 2001
- Episodes: 4
- Anime television series

Di Gi Charat – Tsuyu Special
- Directed by: Hiroaki Sakurai
- Written by: Toru Takahashi
- Studio: Madhouse
- Licensed by: NA: Sentai Filmworks
- Original network: TBS
- Original run: August 25, 2001
- Episodes: 2
- Audio drama

Dejiko's Room 2
- Studio: Broccoli
- Station: Radio Osaka, Nippon Cultural Broadcasting, SBC, MRO, Tokai Radio, RKB
- Original run: October 2001 – March 2002
- Anime film

Di Gi Charat – A Trip to the Planet
- Directed by: Hiroaki Sakurai
- Produced by: Takeshi Yasuda
- Written by: Hiroaki Sakurai; Mamiko Ikeda
- Studio: Madhouse
- Released: December 22, 2001
- Runtime: 25 minutes
- Audio drama

Dejiko-san
- Studio: Broccoli
- Station: Radio Osaka, HBC, TBC, Nippon Cultural Broadcasting, SBC, MRO, Tokai Radio, RNB, RKB, Radio Okinawa
- Original run: April 5, 2002 – March 28, 2003
- Original video animation

Di Gi Charat Theater – Leave it to Piyoko-pyo!
- Directed by: Hiroaki Sakurai
- Produced by: Masao Morosawa; Tetsuro Satomi; Youko Nakano
- Written by: Mamiko Ikeda
- Studio: Madhouse
- Licensed by: NA: Synch-Point
- Released: March 2003 – May 2003
- Episodes: 8
- Audio drama

It's G.A.-nyo
- Studio: Broccoli
- Station: Radio Osaka, HBC, Nippon Cultural Broadcasting, SBC, Tokai Radio, RKB
- Original run: April 5, 2003 – September 6, 2003
- Audio drama

Nyo Nyo Radio
- Studio: Broccoli
- Station: Radio Osaka, Nippon Cultural Broadcasting, Tokai Radio
- Original run: October 3, 2003 – March 26, 2004
- Audio drama

Nyo Nyo Radio
- Studio: Broccoli
- Station: Radio Osaka, Nippon Cultural Broadcasting, Tokai Radio
- Original run: April 2, 2004 – September 24, 2004
- Manga

Winter Garden
- Written by: Koge-Donbo
- Published by: SB Creative
- Magazine: Comi Digi +
- Original run: December 21, 2006 – February 21, 2007
- Volumes: 2
- Anime television series

Winter Garden
- Directed by: Hiroaki Sakurai
- Produced by: Shinichi Nakamura; Takashi Takano
- Written by: Hiroaki Sakurai
- Studio: J.C.Staff
- Licensed by: NA: Sentai Filmworks
- Original network: TBS, BS-i
- Original run: December 23, 2006 – December 24, 2006
- Episodes: 2
- Anime television series

Reiwa no Di Gi Charat
- Directed by: Hiroaki Sakurai
- Studio: Liden Films
- Original network: Tokyo MX, BS NTV
- Original run: October 7, 2022 – January 3, 2023
- Episodes: 16
- Related works
- Panyo Panyo Di Gi Charat (2002); Di Gi Charat Nyo! (2003)
- icon

Di Gi Charat (デ・ジ・キャラット, De Ji Kyaratto) is a Japanese manga and anime series created by Koge-Donbo. The series follows a catgirl named Di Gi Charat "Dejiko" who was adopted as the mascot of Broccoli's retail chain store, Gamers. The original anime series and its original video animations (OVAs) are set in a Gamers store.

Several specials, OVAs, and movies have been adapted as prequels, sequels and alternate stories; trading cards and video games are among the many forms of merchandise released for the series. The original series, movie, and Leave It to Piyoko! were licensed in North America by Synch-Point. The manga series is licensed by several companies. The original series, 4 specials and the Winter Garden special are now licensed by Sentai Filmworks.

== Manga ==
The characters of Di Gi Charat and her sidekick Gema first appeared in July 1998 in From Gamers, a promotional magazine for the Akihabara store, Gamers. In August of that year, the two appeared in Gema Gema (げまげま, Gema Gema), a four-panel comic-strip in From Gamers drawn by dōjin artist Koge-Donbo. Dejiko was later adopted as the mascot of Gamers.

Broccoli Books in the US published the Di Gi Charat Theater series, which contain a number of Di Gi Charat manga by Koge Donbo and several dōjin artists. The comic strip Gema Gema, which still runs in From Gamers, is republished in these volumes. Broccoli Books have stated that all the manga will be translated and released. However, due to Broccoli closing their offices in the US in 2008, Dejiko's Adventure and Leave It to Piyoko! were left unfinished.

Di Gi Charat
Di Gi Charat (デ・ジ・キャラット, De Ji Kyaratto) is a manga serialized in Komi Digi Comics.
Digiko's Champion Cup
Digiko's Championship Cup (でじこのチャンピオンカップ, Dejiko no Chanpion Kappu) is a manga that was serialized in Akita Shoten's Weekly Shōnen Champion from April 2001 to August 2002.
Di Gi Charat – It's Dejiko-Nyo
Di Gi Charat – It's Dejiko-nyo (デ・ジ・キャラット でじこだにょ, De Ji Kyaratto: Dejiko Da-nyo) is a manga published by Jive.
Dejiko's Adventure
Dejiko's Adventure (でじこ★あどべんちゃー, Dejiko Adobencha) is a manga that was serialized in Kadokawa Shoten's Monthly Dragon Junior.
Dejiko à la mode
Dejiko à la mode (でじこ☆あらもーど, Dejiko a ra mōdo) is a manga serialized in the same magazine.
Dejiko's Advice
Dejiko's Advice (でじこのススメ, Dejiko no Susume) is a manga serialized in the same magazine.
Di Gi Charat Theater – Leave It to Piyoko!!
Di Gi Charat Theater – Leave It to Piyoko!! (デ・ジ・キャラット劇場 ぴよこにおまかせっ!!, De Ji Kyaratto Gekijō: Piyoko ni Omakase!!) is a manga serialized in ASCII Media Works's Dengeki Comics.
Di Gi Charat – Piyo Piyo Piyoko-chan
Di Gi Charat – Piyo Piyo Piyoko-chan (デ・ジ・キャラット ぴよぴよぴよこちゃん, De Ji Kyaratto Piyo Piyo Piyoko-chan) is a manga published by Jive.
Di Gi Charat – GGBG!
Di Gi Charat – GGBG! (デ・ジ・キャラット GGBG!, De Ji Kyaratto: Jī Jī Bī Jī!)) is a manga published by Jive.
Di Gi Charat – GGBG! Refill
Di Gi Charat – GGBG! Refill (デ・ジ・キャラット GGBG!おかわり, De Ji Kyaratto: Jī Jī Bī Jī! Okawari) is a manga published by Jive.
Di Gi Charat – Rabian! – Usada's Love Story
Di Gi Charat – Rabian! – Usada's Love Story (デ・ジ・キャラット ラ・ビ・アン!-うさだの恋の物語, De Ji Kyaratto: Rabian! – Usada no Koi no Monogatari) is a manga published by Jive.
Di Gi Charat Official Comic Anthology
Di Gi Charat Official Comic Anthology (デ・ジ・キャラット公式コミックアンソロジー, De Ji Kyaratto: Kōshiki Komikku Ansorojī) is a manga serialized in ASCII Media Works's Dengeki Comics.
Di Gi Charat Official Comic Anthology
Di Gi Charat Official Comic Anthology (デ・ジ・キャラットオフィシャルコミックアンソロジー, De Ji Kyaratto Ofisharu Komikku Ansorojī) is a manga compilation by Broccoli.

Current Di Gi Charat manga released in North America:

Broccoli Books

- Di Gi Charat Theater – Dejiko's Summer Vacation
- Di Gi Charat Theater – Piyoko is Number One!
- Di Gi Charat Theater – Dejiko's Adventure
- Di Gi Charat Theater – Leave It to Piyoko!

Viz Media

- Di Gi Charat Anthology volumes 1–4

Studio Ironcat

- Di Gi Charat series – Di Gi Charat Champion Cup

Comic Di Gi, a bimonthly magazine that is issued by Broccoli, included a Di Gi Charat comic called GemaGema Theater by Koge-Donbo.

Di Gi Charat volumes

No.	Japanese release date	Japanese ISBN
1	August 25, 2000	978-4840213967
2	October 15, 2000	978-4840216883
3	November 24, 2000	978-4840217040
4	March 2003	978-4840222402
5	June 2003	978-4840224154
6	October 2003	978-4840224741

Digiko's Champion Cup volumes

No.	Title	Japanese release date	Japanese ISBN
1	Digiko's Champion Cup Theater; Dejiko no Chanpion Kappu Gekijō (でじこのチャンピオンカップ劇場)	September 26, 2002	978-4253201254
1*	Digiko's Champion Cup Theater – Limited Edition; Dejiko no Chanpion Kappu Gekijō – Genteiban (でじこのチャンピオンカップ劇場 限定版)	2002	978-4938867850

== Anime ==
An animated Dejiko and her sidekick Gema first appeared on in a television advertisement for Gamers, set to the store's theme song, Welcome! by Hiroko Kato. The first anime premiered on the Tokyo Broadcasting System on November 29, 1999. Set in a Gamers store in Akihabara, the original series was sixteen episodes long with each episode running for three minutes. Light-hearted and relatively cheaply animated, the series follows the story of Di Gi Charat (Dejiko), her new sidekick Petit Charat (Puchiko) and Gema, who arrive in Akihabara, Tokyo. Dejiko dreams of becoming an idol, only to realize that they have no money and nowhere to stay. The manager of a Gamers store takes pity on them, and the series follows their exploits as they work in the shop. The series introduces Dejiko's rival, Rabi-en-Rose, and minor characters Abarenbou, Takeshi, Yoshimi, Takurou and Takurou. All other citizens of Akihabara, including the manager, are drawn as anthropomorphic thumbs, the reason being that Akihabara is one of the largest shopping areas of Earth for video games, among other things, and thumbs are most commonly used by people to press buttons while playing video games. The anime is directed by Hiroaki Sakurai, animated by Madhouse and produced by Broccoli.

As 2008 was the 10th anniversary of the series Di Gi Charat, Broccoli Inc. decided to recast the actresses of the main characters of Di Gi Charat. The new actress for Dejiko, Puchiko, and Usada were Satomi Akesaka, Nao Minakami, and Rieka Yazawa respectively.

However, as of the 15th anniversary in 2013, Broccoli Inc. has since reverted to using their original voice actresses and retconned the 10th Anniversary in a comic.

For the series' 24th anniversary, a new mini anime series titled Reiwa no Di Gi Charat has been announced. Hiroaki Sakurai is directing the new series at Liden Films, with Atsuko Watanabe providing the character designs. It aired from October 7, 2022, to January 3, 2023, on Tokyo MX and BS NTV. The theme song is "Aimaisa, Kōfukuron" by Masami Okui.

=== Specials ===
Each special was around twenty minutes long. The specials introduce the Black Gema Gema Gang (Black Gema Gema Dan) and Dejiko's rival, Pyocola Analogue III (Piyoko).

Summer Special 2000
Di Gi Charat – Summer Special 2000 (デ・ジ・キャラット サマースペシャル2000, De Ji Kyaratto – Samā Supesharu Nisen) is a four episode series that aired over two days, August 22, 2000, to August 23, 2000. This was the first series that Piyoko appeared in and the plot involves her attempting to hold Dejiko hostage for ransom.
Christmas Special
Di Gi Charat – Christmas Special (デ・ジ・キャラット クリスマススペシャル, De Ji Kyaratto – Kurisumasu Supesharu) is a special that aired on December 16, 2000, and featured Piyoko again attempting to capture Dejiko by inviting all the characters on a cruise. Piyoko's accomplices Coo, Rik and Ky are introduced.
Ohanami Special
Di Gi Charat – Ohanami Special (デ・ジ・キャラット お花見すぺしゃる, De Ji Kyaratto – Ohanami Supesharu) is a special consisting of four independent episodes with no continuation that aired on April 6, 2001, in Japan.
Natsuyasumi Special
Di Gi Charat – Natsuyasumi Special (デ・ジ・キャラット 夏休みスペシャル, De Ji Kyaratto – Natsuyasumi Supesharu) was another four episode series set in America that aired almost a year after the original series from August 2, 2001, to August 3, 2001. The young American otaku, Rod Young, is introduced in this series.
Tsuyu Special
Di Gi Charat – Tsuyu Special (デ・ジ・キャラット 梅雨スペシャル, De Ji Kyaratto – Tsuyu Supesharu) was a two episode series that aired on August 25, 2001.

=== Movie ===
Di Gi Charat – A Trip to the Planet (デ・ジ・キャラット 星の旅, Di Gi Charat – Hoshi no Tabi) is a movie that premiered on December 22, 2001, in Japan. The twenty-minute animation follows the adventures of Dejiko, Piyoko and Gema as they use the spaceship seen in the first episode to travel back to Dejiko's home planet, Planet Di Gi Charat. It was licensed by Synch-Point and announced at Anime Boston 2003 along with Leave It to Piyoko!

Synch-Point planned to include a 13-minute bonus episode called "Kuchi kara Bazooka" ("Rocket From the Mouth Special" or "Upchuck Bazooka") that was also included in the Japanese release, but it was never released.

=== Panyo Panyo Di Gi Charat ===
A prequel of sorts with its own alternate continuity, Panyo Panyo aired from January 5, 2002, until September 29, 2002. The characters are drawn to look much younger. Princess Dejiko and Puchiko wish to escape castle life to help people of Planet Di Gi Charat achieve happiness. Pyocola Analogue III and hologram Digi Devil try to stop her. In this series Dejiko, Puchiko and Gema meet friends Meek and Rinna.

Panyo Panyo was arranged into five-minute mini episodes in order to make it feel like classic four panel manga. Panyo Panyo did not have the wide open endings which the original series had.

=== Di Gi Charat Theater – Leave it to Piyoko-pyo! ===
Di Gi Charat Theater – Leave it to Piyoko-pyo! (デ・ジ・キャラット劇場 ぴよこにおまかせぴょ！, De Ji Kyaratto Gekijō – Piyoko ni Omakase-pyo!) is an eight episode OVA that was released in 2003. The OVA is the only show in the series where Dejiko is not the main character. Instead it focuses on Piyoko, Rik, Ky, Coo, and the rest of the Black Gema Gema Gang as they leave Planet Analogue and make their way to Earth to kidnap Dejiko.

At Anime Boston 2003, Synch-Point announced they have acquired North American distribution rights to the OVA. It was released on two DVDs on November 15, 2005, and March 7, 2006. Miyuki Sawashiro, the voice actor of Puchiko, also dubbed Puchiko in English for the first six episodes. It marked the first time a Japanese voice actor repeated their role in English for an English anime dub.

=== Di Gi Charat Nyo! ===
An alternate story to the original series, Nyo!, aired from April 6, 2003, until March 28, 2004. There were two stories for each of the fifty-two twenty-minute episodes.

=== Winter Garden ===
Winter Garden (ウィンターガーデン, Uintā Gāden) is a two part spin-off series. Dejiko is around 20 years old and Puchiko is now around 15. Until recently, this was also the last animated project to feature the original voices of the characters. The story starts on Christmas with Dejiko working at a cake shop. She meets a young man named Senba Takuro while going home on Christmas night. Dejiko accidentally drops her cake, but Takuro exchanges his for hers, and love starts after several unplanned meetings with each other.

A promotional video premiered at Anime Expo 2006 during the Di Gi Charat panel sponsored by TBS, PONYCANYON and Broccoli. The series first aired on TBS on December 23, 2006, and December 24, 2006, and later on BS-i.

=== Relation of each series ===
Name	Type	Relation	Length	Year
Di Gi Charat	TV	Original	16 x 4 mins	1999
Summer 2000	Special	Side Story	4 x 11 mins	2000
Christmas	Special	Side Story	1 x 23 mins	2000
Ohanami	Special	Side Story	4 x 10 mins	2001
Natsuyasumi	Special	Side Story	4 x 11 mins	2001
Tsuyu	Special	Side Story	2 x 13 mins	2001
Hoshi no Tabi	Movie	Side Story	1 x 21 mins	2001
Kuchi Kara Bazooka	Special	Side Story	1 x 13 mins	2001
Panyo Panyo Di Gi Charat	TV	Prequel	48 x 8 mins	2002
Piyoko ni Omakase pyo!	OVA	Side Story	8 x 15 mins	2003
Di Gi Charat Nyo	TV	Alternative Version	104 x 12 mins	2003
Winter Garden	Special	Alternative Version	2 x 23 mins	2006
Reiwa no Di Gi Charat	TV	Sequel	16 x 4 mins	2022

== Characters ==
Most of the characters of Di Gi Charat originally debuted in the yonkoma Gema Gema, and later appeared in the anime series. Across all of the Di Gi Charat series, each catgirl ends their sentence with a cat sounding suffix, such as Dejiko's Nyo. The four DVDs of the series Panyo Panyo Di Gi Charat are named after each of the four catgirl's onomatopoeia. Piyoko talks in a similar manner.

=== Main characters ===
Di Gi Charat (デ・ジ・キャラット, De Ji Kyaratto) / Dejiko (でじこ, Dejiko)

- Voiced by: Asami Sanada (1999–2008, 2013–present), Satomi Akesaka (2008) (Japanese); Jessica Gee (season 1), Luci Christian (Panyo Panyo), Chris Simms (Nyo) (English)

Dejiko is the main protagonist of the series. She is also known as Chocola (ショコラ, Syokora) but despite this alternate name implying she likes chocolate, she prefers broccoli. Dejiko has a type A personality and can be aggressive at times.
Dejiko dresses up as a catgirl and is the princess of Planet Di Gi Charat. She is ten years old when she comes to Earth with hopes of becoming an idol singer. She has green eyes, green hair, and her maid-like uniform consists of a white and navy blue dress with large cat bells tied to her hair with navy blue ribbons. She attacks using her eye-beam weapon.

She has the ability to use her eye-beam weapon called the Me Kara Beam. She ends each sentence that she speaks with nyo.
In an interview with Koge-Donbo, she says that of all her character creations Dejiko is most like her.

Petit Charat (プチ・キャラット, Puchi Kyaratto) / Puchiko (ぷちこ, Puchiko)

- Voiced by: Miyuki Sawashiro (1999–2008 and 2013–present, Japanese; English in Leave It to Piyoko!), Nao Minakami (2008, Japanese), Karen Strassman (season 1), Hilary Haag (Panyo Panyo), Mariette Sluyter (Nyo) (English)

At the beginning of the story it is explained that Puchiko, also known as Capuccino, is Dejiko's five-year-old younger sister and is a catgirl. Her relationship to Dejiko is not explained in the original series, but Gema states that she is a princess in the Di Gi Charat Movie and it is seen that she lives with Dejiko in the castle in Panyo Panyo Di Gi Charat. According to early material for the Wonderful Edition anime, Dejiko saved her by pulling her out of a hole, and so Puchiko followed Dejiko to thank her. Although in Winter Garden, it is said that Puchiko is Dejiko's sister and share the same parents.
Puchiko has a type B personality and is known to be quiet and calm. She has the ability to use an eye-beam similar to Dejiko's but is often too docile to conjure the aggression required to perform such a feat. This has caused many things to come out of her eyes, including sludge, when she attempts to use it.

Puchiko dresses as an orange tabby catgirl and has brown hair and dark brown eyes. She wears a seifuku plus cat bells in her hair, though they are much smaller than Dejiko's.

Hikaru Usada (うさだ ヒカル, Usada Hikaru) / Rabi~en~Rose (ラ・ビ・アン・ローズ, Rabi~an~Rōzu)

- Voiced by: Kyōko Hikami (1999–2008, 2013–present), Rieka Yazawa (2008) (Japanese); Michelle Ruff, Carol-Anne Day (Nyo) (English)

Rabi~en~Rose is Dejiko's rival. Her name was decided following a request for reader submissions, and may be a play on a number of things. "Ra Bi an Rozu" can read as gairaigo for the common French saying "La Vie en Rose", literally "life in rose-pink", referring to a life spent without any worries, which might be taken to describe her personality. The Japanese phrase, "rose-coloured" (バラ色, bara iro) also refers figuratively to an optimistic outlook. "Rabi", which resembles the English word "rabbit", replaces "La vie" to form the pun, "Rabbit in rose-pink", describing her appearance. Her real name is Hikaru Usada, a pun on the name of the famous Japanese-American pop singer, Hikaru Utada, which she hates being called. Her "Usada" surname is another a pun: "Usa" is a shortening of the word "usagi", meaning "rabbit" in Japanese.
In the original anime, she is seen as a normal girl who uses dice to transform into her bunnygirl outfit: a pink, white and red dress with large white rabbit ears and a large round cotton tail. Her parents left her to live on her own in an attempt to help her become an idol. Rabi~en~Rose does not use a suffix at the end of her sentences and is the only character with kemonomimi animal traits other than Rik, Ky, and Coo in the Di Gi Charat franchise not to do so.

Gema (ゲマ, Gema)

- Voiced by: Yoshiko Kamei (Japanese); Stephanie Sheh (season 1), Tiffany Grant (Panyo Panyo), Lucas Gilbertson (Nyo) (English)

Gema is explained to be the guardian of Dejiko and Puchiko. Essentially he is a floating yellow balloon that is always upside-down with very small eyes and mouth. Creator Koge Donbo once joked that Gema was the best character because anyone can draw him. He ends his sentences with gema. He can shoot darts out of bamboo sticks; but they have little effect on anyone.

=== Black Gema-Gema Gang ===
Pyocola Analogue III (ピョコラ=アナローグIII世, Pyokora Anarōgu San-sei) / Piyoko (ぴよこ, Piyoko)

- Voiced by: Megumi Hayashibara (Japanese); Sandy Fox (season 1), Kira Vincent-Davis (Panyo Panyo) (English)

Piyoko is eight years old. She is the Princess of planet Analogue and leader of the Black Gema Gema Gang. Her parents left her in Rik, Ky, and Coo's care until she is thirteen because they are embarrassed to show their faces when their attempt to take over planet Di Gi Charat failed. She had to flee to earth because she blew up a city and couldn't pay for repairs. Piyoko's dresses similar to that of a nurse's uniform, but in black and white colors like a panda. She ends her sentences with "pyo" (although certain manga publications depict this as a squeak). She has an attack similar to Dejiko's Laser Eye Beam called Upchuck Bazooka (Kuchikara Bazooka in Japanese) which is a beam that comes from her mouth, but whenever she attempts to attack Dejiko with it, she more often than not gets attacked herself. Note: Piyoko makes a brief cameo in Episode 2 of Cromartie High School as a teenage version of herself.
Rik Heisenberg (リク=ハイゼンベルク, Riku Haizenberuku)

- Voiced by: Kohsuke Toriumi (Japanese); Grant George (English)

Rik is 26 years old (28 in the English dub of Leave It to Piyoko!) and the General of the Black Gema Gema Gang. He plays the role of the veterinarian of the doctor trio. He takes pride in his profession and loves animals. As a result, Rik has many animals around him. The animals include Bun Bun and Amaenbou. As the gang considers themselves a "family", Rik considers himself as the "Daddy".
Ky Schweitzer (カイ=シュヴァイツァー, Kai Shuvuaitsuā)

- Voiced by: Chihiro Suzuki (Japanese); Michael Sinterniklaas (English)

Ky is seventeen years old and the Lieutenant General of the Black Gema Gema Gang. He is a dentist and always worries after Piyoko. Ky makes sure that Piyoko practices proper dental hygiene. As the gang considers themselves a "family", Ky considers himself as the "Mommy", even though he is a male. He seems embarrassed by the title.
Coo Erhard (クウ=エアハルト, Kū Eaharuto)

- Voiced by: Tomo Saeki (Japanese); Wendee Lee, Cole Howard (Nyo) (English)

Coo is thirteen and the Major of the Black Gema Gema Gang. He is the physician of the group. He is Piyoko's childhood friend and is closest to her. Sometimes if food flies through the air he will jump up and catch it in his mouth in a dog-like manner. As the gang considers themselves a "family", Coo is considered the "brother". However, Piyoko thinks she is older than he is, although she is only 8 while he is 13. He treasures a stuffed panda that Piyoko gave to him.
Nazo Gema (謎ゲマ, Nazo Gema)
Gema's counterpart in the Black Gema Gema Gang. Like Gema, it is round and floats in the air, but instead of being yellow, it is black. It also has large spooky eyes and red lips.
Black Gema-Gema Danin
is worker from analogue planet-di gi charat danin's counterpart. They end their sentences with "Geba".

=== Minor characters ===
Takeshi – Voiced by: Ryo Naito (Japanese); Taliesin Jaffe (English) and Yoshimi – Voiced by: Morihisa Mori (Japanese); Liam O'Brien (English)

- The two self-styled "fans of Dejiko". Takeshi is fatter, Yoshimi is thinner, and both wear glasses. In the original series, Dejiko interprets Takeshi's name as "bu" and Yoshimi's name as "kimi". Thus, for the remainder of the series, she refers to the pair collectively as Bukimi (meaning 'weird'/'unpleasant smell').

Takurou Minagawa

- Voiced by: Omi Minami (Japanese); Dorothy Elias-Fahn (English)

A boy who comes into the store to buy trading cards and falls in love with Rabi-en-Rose, in the Reiwa anime, is confirmed that he and Rabi-in-Rose study in the same school. Enjoys melonpan. Not related to Kimura, though they share the same first name.

Takurou Kimura

- Voiced by: Ryotaro Okiayu (Japanese); Ezra Weisz (English)

A rich and long-haired man infatuated with Puchiko's cuteness and have a problem with the suffix that some characters use at the end. Not related to Minagawa.

Abarenbou (暴れん坊, Abarenbō)

- Voiced by: Yūji Ueda (Japanese); Geoffrey Fontaine (English)

A rowdy creature seemingly made of water. His appearances in the series are always incredibly random and crazy.

Rod Young

An excitable American fan of Di Gi Charat.

Mister Manager

- Voiced by: Kazuya Ichijō (Japanese); Sam Riegel (English)

A thoughtful finger-person who runs Gamers and sends Dejiko on errands.

Hokke Mirin

A cat who is Puchiko's sidekick. It can walk sideways and has five kittens; Sa, Shi, Su, Se, and So. During the time between Di Gi Charat and Reiwa no Di Gi Charat, it takes the place of Puchiko in the store when she and Dejiko are in the Di Gi Charat Planet.

Majin Gappa

A small green creature likened to a kappa, is Rabi-en-Rose's sidekick. During the time between DiGi Charat and Reiwa no Di Gi Charat, it takes the place of Rabi-en-Rose in the store, meanwhile she is very busy with the exams and homework.

Henna Ikimono (変な生き物, Henna Ikimono; lit. 'Strange Creature')

A mysterious, tiny, yellow bear. Its face always appears to be angry, crying, depressed and laughing at the same time. It always remains in its box and is always seen as being completely still. On one side of the box, "Please give me a home" is written in Japanese. It can eat things bigger than itself. In Party Night, he ate the Earth.

Broccodes

She is the goddess of Broccoli's company. She appears for first time in Reiwa no Di Gi Charat, replacing Dejiko when she and Puchiko are in the Di Gi Charat Planet during the time between Di Gi Charat and Reiwa no Di Gi Charat. The only two that knows about the change are Dejiko and Gamers's Manager.

Bushimo-no-Mikoto

She is the goddess of Bushiroad's company, she had as aspect of a devil samurai, is kouhai of Broccodes and is a fan of the original anime. She appears for first time in Reiwa no Di Gi Charat.

== Music ==
A great number of Di Gi Charat albums have been released, including soundtracks to the anime as well as collections of original songs sung by the main characters. These albums include drama CDs which expand the Di Gi Charat story.

== Games ==
A game titled Di Gi Charat Fantasy was released for the Dreamcast. It's a visual novel style game, in which the player takes on the role of a boy with a crush on Dejiko who, along with Dejiko, Puchiko, and Rabi-en-Rose, gets sucked through a dimensional vortex into a fantasy world. The player finds himself alone with Dejiko in a forest, and she's lost her memory. In this game, players are given a very different view of Dejiko, as the amnesia makes her innocent and shy.

This game later was ported to PlayStation 2 and was renamed Di Gi Charat Fantasy Excellent. Since the PS2 version uses DVD-ROM media, it features improved FMV cutscenes and additional VA. The PS2 port came with a Standard release and a "Premium Box" release that contained one extra disc.

Di Gi Charat: Digi-communication I & II

Digi-communication (でじこミュニケーション, Dejikomyunikēshon) is a game series for the Game Boy Advance. On October 25, 2002, the first game was released by Broccoli, the sequel a year later. The games are based on money management. Choosing one of the three main characters of the anime, the player takes the role as the manager of the store with the objective of running the store on the little money available. The game takes aspects of the anime into its gameplay including character art and an instrumental music score of popular songs from the anime composed by Manabu Namiki for the games.

Glove on Fight

Dejiko appeared as a selectable character in the 2D fighting game Glove on Fight for the PC. The game contains several popular mascot characters such as Ecoco and characters from well known visual novels and anime such as To Heart and Tsukihime. This was a fanmade (or doujinshi) game by the circle French-Bread.

Dejiko no Maibura

Dreamcast game.

Dejiko no Mahjong Party

Game Boy Color game.

Di Gi Charat Puzzle'

Game for iOS.

== Reception ==
Zac Bertschy of Anime News Network gave a review of the limited edition Di Gi Charat volume 1 release with saying "Even if you're turned off by the cute little characters, give Di Gi Charat: The Original Series a spin. Even the crankiest and most jaded of anime fans will appreciate the wildly original and very funny humor. It's never weird simply for the sake of being weird; everything that happens in the show is in the name of comedy, and the series religiously follows its own twisted logic." Tho would give a comment on the dub being very poor. Later Carl Kimlinger from Anime News Network gave Di Gi Charat Nyo!'s first DVD a review in which he describes Dejiko having a "mercenary personality and butt-scratching manners" with a "frilly-cute exterior". In Panyo Panyo Di Gi Charat, Carlo Santos from Anime News Network describes Dejiko having a temper that "adds some spice to her goody-goody nature". In contrast, in the alternate story Winter Garden where she is now twenty, Chris Beveridge from the Fandom Post describes Dejiko as a "normal young woman".
