= Dejiko =

- Di Gi Charat character
- Dejiko from the Di Gi Charat Nyo! anime
- Created by: Koge-Donbo
- Voiced by: Japanese: Asami Sanada (1999-2008, 2013-present); Satomi Akesaka (2008-2012); English: Jessica Gee (2005); Luci Christian (2004); Chris Simms (2006)

Di Gi Charat (Japanese: デ・ジ・キャラット, Hepburn: De Ji Kyaratto), also known as Dejiko or Digiko, is the main protagonist of the manga and anime of the same name created by Koge-Donbo. She is a green-haired catgirl who wears a white cat-themed hat and blue maid dress. She ends her sentences with the cat sound "nyo". Despite her appearance, she has a sarcastic personality and can be violent at times, having the ability to shoot lasers from her eyes.

== Concept ==
Dejiko first appeared in July of 1998 in the FROM GAMERS magazine among a promotional ad for the game The King of Fighters '98, Later she would appear in the August of 1998 issue appearing in the 4Koma strip GEMA-GEMA where she introduces herself and would describe herself as a big fan of Iori Yagami, She was portrayed as a "Fujoshi" and the link between her and Iori would expanded more as she would be seen collecting BL Doujinshi of the pairing between King of Fighters characters Iori Yagami and Kyo Kusanagi in a later 4Koma as well another focusing on her visit to Comiket, Later on Dejiko would reach notoriety in the magazine and would be adopted as a mascot for Gamers,

In an interview with Koge-Donbo, she says that of all her characters, Dejiko is most like her.

== Appearances ==
Dejiko's appearance in Panyo Panyo Di Gi Charat

Dejiko has appeared in each of the Di Gi Charat anime series. In Di Gi Charat, she comes to Earth with hopes of becoming an idol singer. In Panyo Panyo Di Gi Charat, she appears with a younger, chibi-fied design.

She has appeared in two Game Boy Advance games, the Di Gi Charat: Di Gi Communication series, and three computer games: Glove on Fight, Moe Moe (as selectable character) and Kakuge Yaro (as cameo in one stage). She was the featured character in the Game Boy Color game, Dejiko no Mahjong Party.

Dejiko has also appeared in anime outside of the Di Gi Charat series in cameo roles, including Galaxy Angel, Cromartie High School, Power Stone.

== Reception ==
Carl Kimlinger from Anime News Network gave Di Gi Charat Nyo!'s first DVD a review in which he describes Dejiko having a "mercenary personality and butt-scratching manners" with a "frilly-cute exterior". In the prequel Panyo Panyo Di Gi Charat, Carlo Santos describes Dejiko having a temper that "adds some spice to her goody-goody nature".
