= Ai Tokunaga =

Japanese voice actress and singer

Ai Tokunaga (徳永愛, Tokunaga Ai; born March 12, 1981) is a Japanese voice actress and singer. Her talent agency is Arts Vision.

== Notable voice roles ==
- Ultimate Girls – Moroboshi Tsubomi
- Canvas 2 – Kana Hagino
- Heat Guy J – Vivian
- Kiddy Grade – Viola
- Les Misérables: Shōjo Cosette – Hugues
- Fatal Fury – Nakokuru
- Magical Play – Padudu
- Pita-Ten – Miku
- UFO Baby – Pepo
- GA Geijutsuka Art Design Class – Noda Miki
- Pandora Hearts – Ada Vessalius (Drama CD)
