= GA Geijutsuka Art Design Class =

Japanese manga series

- Cover art of the first GA Geijutsuka Art Design Class manga volume

GA 芸術科アートデザインクラス (GA Geijutsuka Āto Dezain Kurasu)
- Genre: Comedy, slice of life
- Manga
- Written by: Satoko Kiyuzuki
- Published by: Heiwa Shuppan; Houbunsha
- English publisher: NA: Yen Press
- Magazine: Comic Gyutto!; (2004); Manga Time Kirara Carat; (2005–2015)
- Original run: July 23, 2004 – December 28, 2015
- Volumes: 7
- Anime television series
- Directed by: Hiroaki Sakurai
- Written by: Touko Machida
- Studio: AIC Plus+
- Original network: Yomiuri TV
- Original run: July 6, 2009 – September 21, 2009
- Episodes: 12 + OVA

GA Geijutsuka Art Design Class (Japanese: GA 芸術科アートデザインクラス, Hepburn: GA Geijutsuka Āto Dezain Kurasu; Also written "GA Art Department Art Design Class") is a Japanese seinen yonkoma manga series by Satoko Kiyuzuki. The series was serialized in Heiwa Shuppan's moe four-panel manga magazine Comic Gyutto! from its first issue on July 23, 2004, to its last issue (the third issue). Afterwards a one-shot manga appeared in the August 2005 issue of Houbunsha's seinen manga magazine, Manga Time Kirara Carat, and started regular serialization from the November 2005 issue to the December 2015 issue. Yen Press announced at Comic Con 2008 that it had acquired a license for English-language distribution of GA Geijutsuka Art Design Class in North America. A 12-episode anime adaptation aired in Japan between July and September 2009.

== Summary ==
Five girls—Kisaragi, Miyabi, Tomokane, Namiko, and Miki—are in the GA Art Design Class at Ayanoi Academy where they learn graphic design, art techniques and other subjects. The story follows their day-to-day lives and the activities of some the teachers and Art Club members of the academy.

== Characters ==
=== Main characters ===
Kisaragi Yamaguchi (山口 如月, Yamaguchi Kisaragi)
Voiced by: Haruka Tomatsu
A student in the GA-1 class. With over-sized glasses that reflect her clumsy tendency, she has a gentle personality. She is gullible, buying pencils that was supposedly used by the "God of Studies", Sugawara no Michizane, from over 1100 years ago. Unfortunately, her personality makes her an easy target for Noda and Tomokane's jokes. She finds natural/plain-coloured cats (Suneko 素猫) irresistible, evident through her constant doodling of them in her sketchbook. Yamaguchi loves painting and works very hard to improve, but to her dismay, her artworks often get destroyed by Tomokane and Noda. However, she still cares deeply for her friends as she was very worried when Nozaki was sick. Her favorite style of fashion is revealed to be kimonos.
Miki Noda (野田 ミキ, Noda Miki)
Voiced by: Ai Tokunaga
A student in the GA-1 class. Cute and small, Noda often gets mistaken for a grade school girl. As a result, she wears her high school uniform with pride. Nozaki calls her "Hime" (princess) because she acts spoiled at times. She gets easily bored and often comes up with interesting ideas to spice things up. For instance, she turned a normal lunch into a game where everyone drew lottery and had to follow the rule written on there. Nicknamed "Alchemist", she also enjoys mixing a variety of things, including drinks. Extremely talented and motivated in her studies, she is also shown to be very moody, which does seem to affect her work. Her hobby is fashion and spends an average of eight minutes on each page in a fashion magazine. Noda is usually seen with a different hairstyle every time, indicative of her love for fashion. She is able to have an "insight" into what a person is wearing and immediately able to tell its origins. She has a sister in the third year.
Tomokane (友兼)
Voiced by: Miyuki Sawashiro
A student in the GA-1 class. She is the tomboy of the group and always gets herself in trouble due to her explosive temperament. Her personality seems to be influenced by her years of frustration over her brother. He never lets her win in a game of wit and because he has a weak constitution, she is unable to do anything to him physically. She likes to do things through brute force, for example, using her grip power to draw different shades, instead of different pencils. Although her techniques and methods are normally quite blunt, she is shown to have incredible talent. However, she has a habit of destroying artworks, particularly those of Yamaguchi. She teams up with Noda for many hilarious situations and jokes.
Miyabi Ōmichi (大道 雅, Ōmichi Miyabi)
Voiced by: Kaori Nazuka
A student in the GA-1 class. Nicknamed "professor" (キョージュ, kyōju) by her friends due to her intelligence, she has excellent grades and teaches her friends many art concepts. Although she rarely smiles, she is shown to be incredibly reliable, able to pull out anything her friends need from inside her jacket. Adding to her mysterious character is her strange "powers", like natural magnetism or the ability to control animals. Despite her stoic mannerisms, she is still quite playful and likes to be with her friends. Although she is very popular among the other classes, she has yet to find a boyfriend, but claims that her parents have already picked out a fiance for her. She addresses everyone in a very samurai-formal, but awkward (in the modern Japanese context) manner by attaching "-dono" in place of "-san". Her favorite color is black and it frequently appears in her artwork.
Namiko Nozaki (野崎 奈三子, Nozaki Namiko)
Voiced by: Yui Horie
A student in the GA-1 class. Tall and well endowed, Nozaki is the oldest of the girls. She unintentionally acts as the "mother/older sister" figure for the other girls (more towards Kisaragi to her clumsy nature), always prone to help or scold them. There is a running gag where she gets called "Okaa-san" or "Onee-san" and dislikes it. She especially likes to tease Noda and sometimes calls her "Hime" (princess) due to her behavior. Evident early in the anime, she lacks the ability to make jokes, but is quick to criticize other jokes. She has an older sister that has already graduated from the GA class.

=== Art Club Members ===
Chikako Awara (芦原 ちかこ, Awara Chikako)
Voiced by: Akemi Kanda
An energetic and playful student in the GA-3 class. She is also the president of the Fine Arts club. She frequently takes out her rage on her juniors and the equipment. Her personality is very eccentric but seems to be well liked, most likely because of her Chubu accent that many people mistake for Kansai dialect. Awara is best friends with Mizubuchi, who she calls "Buchi-san".
Mizubuchi (水渕)
Voiced by: Ami Koshimizu
A mature student in the GA-3 class. She is a childhood friend of Kisaragi Yamaguchi and the guardian of Chikako Awara. Mizubuchi is the one who introduces Yamaguchi to Ayanoi Gakuen. Over the years, Mizubuchi has learned how to deal with Awara's eccentric personality effectively. She is best friends with Awara, who she calls "Aa-san".
Uozumi (魚住)
Voiced by: Katsuyuki Konishi
A student of the FA-3 normal class. He is also the vice president of the Fine Arts club.
Homura (保村)
Voiced by: Ryo Naitou
A student of the KJ-2 car maintenance class. He is usually the target of Awara's rage.
Tomokane's older brother
Voiced by: Miyuki Sawashiro
A student in the GA-2 class and the newest member of the Fine Arts club. He has a weak constitution, which caused him to miss most of his first year. He joined the club after participating in the haunted house club event. Though outwardly well mannered, he actually enjoys playing tricks on people.

=== Teachers ===
Takuma Sotoma (外間 巧真, Sotoma Takuma)
Voiced by: Kyousei Tsukui
The teacher responsible for the GA-1 class. Sotoma can be very strict, often making his students redo assignments. However, he is still well respected by the students.
Mayumi Usami (宇佐美 真由実, Usami Mayumi)
Voiced by: Omi Minami
An alumna of the school who works as an assistant homeroom teacher to Sotoma. She is a beautiful and hardworking teacher, but can sometimes be very childish, evident through her behavior during the blood drive. Some of her students call her "Samechan-sensei" because during her first year teaching, she stuttered while stating her name and said "Usame" instead of "Usami". She enjoys teaching very much. She is also scared very easily. Usami may have romantic feelings towards Sotoma, as she secretly made copies of his students' work depicting him and her as a romantic couple.
Sasamoto (笹本)
Voiced by: Minami Takayama
The teacher responsible for the GA-3 class. Her appearance is tomboyish and has a stoic personality. Preferring to work quietly, she has agreed to be the advisor to two clubs, Fine Arts club and School Life Environment club (which later combine into one due to lack of members). Known as "Tono-sensei" by the club members, Sasamoto admits that she only agreed to be the advisor so she can use the club room freely. Therefore, she has almost no responsibility, frequently skipping the club sessions to go smoking.
Her real name was revealed as "Kanoto Sasamoto" (笹本 辛, Sasamoto Kanoto) in the illustration book "GA Geijutsuka Art Design Works Core Curriculum" published after the completion of the original work.
Yoshino Koshino (越廼 淑乃, Koshino Yoshino)
Voiced by: Chinami Nishimura (OVA)
A strict and old teacher that specializes in fashion. Kisaragi is afraid of this teacher because she tends to yell at her students.

=== Others ===
Yoshikawa (吉川)
Voiced by: Mariya Ise
A student in the GA-1 class. She and Oomichi won awards for their art and had it displayed at the local prefecture art exhibit.
Fujiko Nozaki (野崎 風二子, Nozaki Fujiko)
The original president of the Fine Arts club when Awara was still a first-year. In Volume 5 of the manga series, this is confirmed to be Namiko's older sister, who had already graduated.
Noda's older sister
Voiced by: Masae Nazuka
A student in the FA-3 normal class. She sometimes appears in a fashion magazine so she is very popular at Ayanoi Gakuen (though her face is never seen.)
Yuuko Mitsui (三井 祐子, Mitsui Yūko)
Voiced by: Ikumi Hayama
A student in the GA-3 class.
Nao Maruoka (丸岡 ナオ, Maruoka Nao)
Voiced by: Satomi Satō
A student in the GA-3 class.
Marianne Van Tienen
A transfer student from France, who appears in Volume 4 of the manga series. She tries to create a trendy, yet traditional, kimono during her time in GA.
Originally the protagonist of the Japanese PlayStation portable game "GA Geijutsuka Art Design Class Slapstick WONDER LAND".
Natsuki Hata
A middle school student Kisaragi and Noda meet when taking refuge from the rain in Volume 5 of the manga. She draws in a "hideout" under an overpass, as her mother opposes her drawing at home.

== Media ==
=== Manga ===
==== Volume list ====
No.	Original release date	Original ISBN	English release date	English ISBN
1	September 27, 2006	978-4-8322-7593-5	April 21, 2009	978-0-7595-2903-8
The first 3 chapters from Comic Gyutto!; Translation Notes
2	January 28, 2008	978-4-8322-7675-8	November 17, 2009	978-0-7595-3070-6
3	August 27, 2009	978-4-8322-7835-6	December 21, 2010	978-0-316-12804-9
4	October 27, 2011	978-4-8322-4077-3	September 25, 2012	978-0-316-22545-8
5	August 27, 2012	978-4-8322-4185-5	June 25, 2013	978-0-316-25084-9
6	January 27, 2014	978-4-8322-4396-5	September 23, 2014	978-0-3163-3589-8
7	February 27, 2016	978-4-8322-4396-5	October 25, 2016	978-0-3164-6602-8

=== Anime ===
A 12-episode anime television series adaptation produced by AIC and directed by Hiroaki Sakurai aired in Japanese between July 6 and September 21, 2009, on Yomiuri TV.

No.	Title	Original release date
1	"Drawing Fun"; Transliteration: "Egaite Asobo" (Japanese: えがいてあそぼ)	July 6, 2009
The first episode of the series where viewers are first introduced to all of the main characters.
2	"The Divine Pencil"; Transliteration: "Kamisama no Enpitsu" (Japanese: 神様の鉛筆)	July 13, 2009
The gang goes shopping and discovers the story behind Kisaragi's "special" pencil set.
3	"Tag Collage"; Transliteration: "Onigokko Korāju" (Japanese: オニごっこコラージュ)	July 20, 2009
The girls learn about collages, and play a game of freeze, and later color, tag in the process.
4	"The Importance of Photography"; Transliteration: "Shashin Tonchi Inokorisan" (Japanese: 写真とんち居残りさん)	July 27, 2009
The group learns about photography, and what it takes to get a great shot.
5	"Life Art"; Transliteration: "Seikatasu dezain Buchōgoya" (Japanese: 生活デザイン部長小屋)	August 3, 2009
The gang works on "life art" which they find to be the application of art to everyday consumer products.
6	"The Haunted Art Room"; Transliteration: "Bijutsubu Yashiki" (Japanese: 美術部やしき)	August 10, 2009
The girls discover a "haunted" portion of the school, only to find out that it was an elaborate prank by the art club.
7	"Trompe-l'oeil"; Transliteration: "Toroppu Ruiyu" (Japanese: 騙し絵(トロンプ・ルイユ))	August 17, 2009
The group visits a local art museum and learns a lot during their visit.
8	"Surrealism"; Transliteration: "Shururearisumu" (Japanese: シュルレアリスム)	August 24, 2009
The gang learns about surrealism while poor Kisaragi lapses into sleep in several occasions and starts having freaky dreams.
9	"Strong Wind Stories"; Transliteration: "Kyōfū Kūsō" (Japanese: 強風空想)	August 31, 2009
The girls have some fun around the school while the weather gets windy.
10	"The Border Between Life and Death"; Transliteration: "Odai wa "Sei to Shi no Sakai"" (Japanese: お題は『生と死の境』)	September 7, 2009
A blood donation bus arrives at the school and the girls learn about the importance of PR mascots as they are assigned to design one in class.
11	"A Happy Ending"; Transliteration: "Shiawase na Ketsumatsu" (Japanese: しあわせな結末)	September 14, 2009
The art club is given an offer to do a set of pictures for a local kindergarten school's story time.
12	"Hexenkessel"; Transliteration: "Hekusen Kesseru" (Japanese: ヘクセン・ケッセル)	September 21, 2009
After discovering that Namiko is staying home sick for the day, the group tries to cope without her. After her return the girls have a sleepover so that they can get their projects completed on time, but due to an off-the-wall dinner not much gets done.
OVA	Transliteration: "Aozora ga Kakitai" (Japanese: 青空が描きたい)	April 2, 2010
The girls take a fashion class and are tasked with designing original costumes. Kisaragi has trouble finishing the assignment until Noda gives her some insight. In the second part of the OVA, Kisaragi reveals how she decided to become an art student. She goes on different errands around the school.

=== Game ===
A PSP game published and developed by Russell was released on July 29, 2010, under the name GA: Geijutsuka Art Design Class -Slapstick Wonderland-. The game was released on both limited and regular editions. Characters from the series appear alongside other Manga Time Kirara characters in the 2019 mobile RPG, Kirara Fantasia.
