= Asami Sanada =

Japanese actress

- 真田 アサミ
- Born: September 8, 1977 (age 49); Ueda, Nagano Prefecture, Japan
- Occupations: Actress; voice artist
- Years active: 1999–present
- Agent: Amuleto

Asami Sanada (真田 アサミ, Sanada Asami; born September 8, 1977) is a Japanese actress from Nagano Prefecture. She voiced the role of Vita in the Magical Girl Lyrical Nanoha series, Dejiko in Di Gi Charat, Jun Sakurada in the Rozen Maiden series, Kurumi Tokisaki in the Date A Live series, and Sawako Yamanaka in the K-On! series,.

== Filmography ==
=== Anime ===
1999

- Di Gi Charat – Dejiko/Di Gi Charat
- Pokémon – Charmaine

2000

- Mon Colle Knights – Cooking King Pole of Heating, Southern
- Daa! Daa! Daa! – Seiya Yaboshi
- Muteki Ō Tri-Zenon – Ai Kamui

2001

- Sugar: A Little Snow Fairy – Phil
- Angel Tales – Nana
- Mahoromatic – Chizuko Oe

2002

- Gekito! Crush Gear Turbo – Michael Steiner
- One Piece - Carol
- Lightning Attack Express – K-kun, Suguru Shinagawa
- Mahoromatic: Something More Beautiful – Chizuko Oe
- Petite Princess Yucie – Student A (ep 8)
- Sister Princess: Re Pure – Boy
- Galaxy Angel A – Waitress Robo (ep 9)

2003

- Mouse – Uta Yukino
- Nanaka 6/17 – Magical Domiko
- Di Gi Charat Nyo – Di Gi Charat / Dejiko (Chocolat)
- Tantei Gakuen Q – Momoko Tachikawa
- Shadow Star Narutaru – Shiina Tamai
- The Galaxy Railways – Louis Fort Drake

2004

- Cromartie High School – Dejiko
- This Ugly Yet Beautiful World – Mari Nishino
- Bleach – Hashigami, Kanisawa, Michuru Ogawa, Rizu, Tojoin Heita, Waineton, Zabimaru
- Rozen Maiden – Jun Sakurada

2005

- Pandalian – Kiddo
- Elemental Gelade – Serena
- Fushigiboshi no Futago Hime – Milky
- Ah My Buddha – Western Doll
- Akahori Gedō Hour Rabuge – Dedeko
- Magical Girl Lyrical Nanoha A's – Vita
- Rozen Maiden: Träumend – Jun Sakurada

2006

- Amaenaide yo!! Katsu!! – Kazuki Kazusano
- Key Princess Story: Eternal Alice Rondo – Moyu Moegihara
- Hime-sama Goyojin – Rasse
- Ah! My Goddess: Flights of Fancy – Shiho Sakakibara
- La Corda D'Oro: primo passo – Young Yunoki Azuma
- Galaxy Angel Rune – Dark-ish Suspect (Di Gi Charat/Dejiko) (ep 5), Kamisama (Di Gi Charat/Dejiko) (ep 9), Kuroki
- Ginga Tetsudo Monogatari: Eien e no Bunkiten – Louise Fort Drake
- Code Geass: Lelouch of the Rebellion – Female student (ep 3), Girl (ep 6)
- Fushigiboshi no Futago Hime Gyu! – Athlee
- Venus to Mamoru – Emelenzia Beatrix Rudiger
- Rozen Maiden: Ouvertüre – Jun Sakurada, Sarah
- Di Gi Charat: Winter Garden – Di Gi Charat
- The Galaxy Railways: A Letter from the Abandoned Planet – Louise Fort Drake

2007

- Les Misérables: Shoujo Cosette – Daniel
- Magical Girl Lyrical Nanoha StrikerS – Vita
- Sayonara, Zetsubou-Sensei – Matoi Tsunetsuki

2008

- Zoku Sayonara Zetsubō Sensei – Matoi Tsunetsuki
- Porfy no Nagai Tabi – Morris
- Noramimi – Smith
- Kurenai – Tamaki Mutō
- Antique Bakery – Young Keiichiro Tachibana
- Strike Witches – Chris
- Negibōzu no Asatarō – Ringo no Orin

2009

- Maria Holic – Kanako Miyamae
- K-ON! – Sawako Yamanaka
- Zan Sayonara Zetsubō Sensei – Matoi Tsunetsuki
- Mahoromatic: I'm Home! – Chizuko Oe

2010

- Bakugan Battle Brawlers: New Vestroia – Purandon
- K-ON!! – Sawako Yamanaka
- Digimon Fusion – Spadamon

2011

- Freezing – Lewis L. Bridgette
- Nichijou – Schoolgirl
- Maria†Holic: Alive – Kanako Miyamae
- Nura: Rise of the Yokai Clan: Demon Capital – Pato Keikain
- Future Diary – Reisuke Hōjō

2012

- Humanity Has Declined – Fairy
- Koi to Senkyo to Chocolate – Hidaka Shiohama

2013

- Date A Live – Kurumi Tokisaki
- Valvrave the Liberator – Eri Watari
- Rozen Maiden: Zurückspulen – Young Jun Sakurada
- Freezing Vibration – Lewis L. Bridgette (Young)
- Valvrave the Liberator Season 2 – Eri Watarai

2014

- Inari Kon Kon – Kamu-O-Ichi-Hime
- Date A Live II – Kurumi Tokisaki
- Pripara – Garuru

2015

- Magical Girl Lyrical Nanoha ViVid – Vita

2017

- Chaos;Child – Mio Kunosato

2018

- Fate/Extra Last Encore – Rani VIII

2019

- Date A Live III – Kurumi Tokisaki
- YU-NO: A Girl Who Chants Love at the Bound of this World – Sayless

2020

- Date A Live Fragment: Date A Bullet – Kurumi Tokisaki

2021

- Kaginado – Misuzu Kamio, Sayuri Kurata

2022

- Date A Live IV – Kurumi Tokisaki
- Reiwa no Di Gi Charat – Di Gi Charat

=== Video games ===
- K-On! Hōkago Live!! (2010) – Sawako Yamanaka
- Fate/Extra (2011) – Rani VIII
- Tales of Xillia (2011) – Musee
- Tales of Xillia 2 (2012) – Musee
- Fate/Extra CCC (2013) – Rani VIII
- Disorder 6 - Hinako
- Super Heroine Chronicle (2014) – Di Gi Charat
- Hyper Galaxy Fleet (2015) – Tominaga Kaoru
- Sakura Angels (2015) – Hikari
- YU-NO: A Girl Who Chants Love at the Bound of this World (2017 Remake) - Sayless
- Action Taimanin (2011) - Aina Winchester
