= Yoshiko Kamei =

Japanese voice actress

- 亀井 芳子
- Born: May 25, 1967 (age 59); Ibaraki Prefecture, Japan
- Occupation: Voice actress
- Years active: 1988–present
- Notable credit(s): Di Gi Charat as Gema

Yoshiko Kamei (亀井 芳子, Kamei Yoshiko; born May 25, 1967) is a Japanese voice actress from Ibaraki Prefecture. She is affiliated with Mausu Promotion.

== Roles ==
=== Animation ===
- Anime Himitsu no Hanazono (Bunny)
- Atashin'chi (Nursing practitioner, Hanae)
- Baby and Me (Tadashi Gotō, Taichi Kimura)
- Beyblade (Suzuka, Kōji)
- B't X (Young Teppei Takamiya)
- Captain Tsubasa (Teppei Kisugi)
- Clamp School Detectives (Marron)
- Cooking Papa (Hiroshi)
- Crayon Shin-chan: Shrouded in Mystery! The Flowers of Tenkazu Academy (Homeroom Teacher)
- Detective School Q (Sayuri Renjō, Obā-san, Masae Kirihara, wrestler #2, Atsufumi)
- Di Gi Charat (Gema)
- Dokkiri Doctor (Kyōko Oda)
- Doraemon (Nobisuke (second voice), Michibikienzel (second voice))
- Figure 17 (Tokio Seizan)
- Hamtaro (Kurohamu-kun)
- Juuni Senshi Bakuretsu Eto Ranger (Monk)
- Magical Angel Sweet Mint (Ian)
- Magical Nyan Nyan Taruto (Kakiemori)
- Monster (Torahako policewoman)
- Ninku (Ken Futoshi, Areku)
- Nintama Rantarō (Tensaimaru)
- Pokémon (Teru, Tobia)
- Ranma ½ (Sayuri)
- Reiwa no Di Gi Charat (Gema)
- Rerere no Tensai Bakabon (Bakabon)
- Secret of Cerulean Sand (Jannu)
- Soar High! Isami (Toshi Tsukikage)
- The Vision of Escaflowne (Young Van Slanzar de Fanel)
- Ultra Nyan: Hoshizora Kara Maiorita Fushigi Neko (1997) (Ultra Nyan)
- Ultra Nyan 2: Happy Daisakusen (movie) (1998) (Ultra Nyan)
- Yamato Takeru (Yamato Takeru)
- YuYu Hakusho (Ayame, Tsukihito Amanuma)

=== Video games ===
- Crash Tag Team Racing (Nina Cortex)
- Grandia (Guido)
- Guardian Heroes (Randy M. Green)
- Super Heroine Chronicle (Mother/Diva)

=== Dubbing roles ===
==== Live-action ====
- About a Boy (Marcus Brewer (Nicholas Hoult))
- Catch That Kid (Austin (Corbin Bleu))
- Child's Play 3 (Ronald Tyler (Jeremy Sylvers))
- Die Hard with a Vengeance (Raymond (Aldis Hodge))
- Eight Legged Freaks (Mike Parker (Scott Terra))
- Falling Down (Angie (Karina Arroyave))
- Final Destination 2 (2006 TV Tokyo edition) (Isabella Hudson (Justina Machado)
- Ghost (Rose (Martina Deignan))
- The Glass House (Rhett Baker (Trevor Morgan))
- A Good Year (Young Max Skinner (Freddie Highmore))
- Goosebumps (Gale Cooper (Amy Ryan))
- Internal Affairs (Sean Stretch (Elijah Wood))
- Jumanji (Young Alan Parrish (Adam Hann-Byrd))
- Last Action Hero (Danny Madigan (Austin O'Brien))
- Little Women (Amy March (Kirsten Dunst))
- The Man Without a Face (Chuck Norstadt (Nick Stahl))
- Mighty Morphin Power Rangers: The Movie (Fred Kelman (Jamie Croft))
- One Hour Photo (Jake Yorkin (Dylan Smith))
- Pecker (Little Chrissy (Lauren Hulsey))
- Showgirls (Molly Abrams (Gina Ravera))
- Stand by Me (Vern Tessio (Jerry O'Connell))
- The Three Stooges (Mother Superior (Jane Lynch)
- Wild America (Marshall Stouffer (Jonathan Taylor Thomas))
- Wild Wild West (Rita Escobar (Salma Hayek))

==== Animation ====
- Code Lyoko (Jeremie Belpois)
- Curious George (Steve)
- The Rescuers Down Under (Faloo)
