= Miyuki Sawashiro =

Japanese voice actress (born 1985)

- 沢城 みゆき
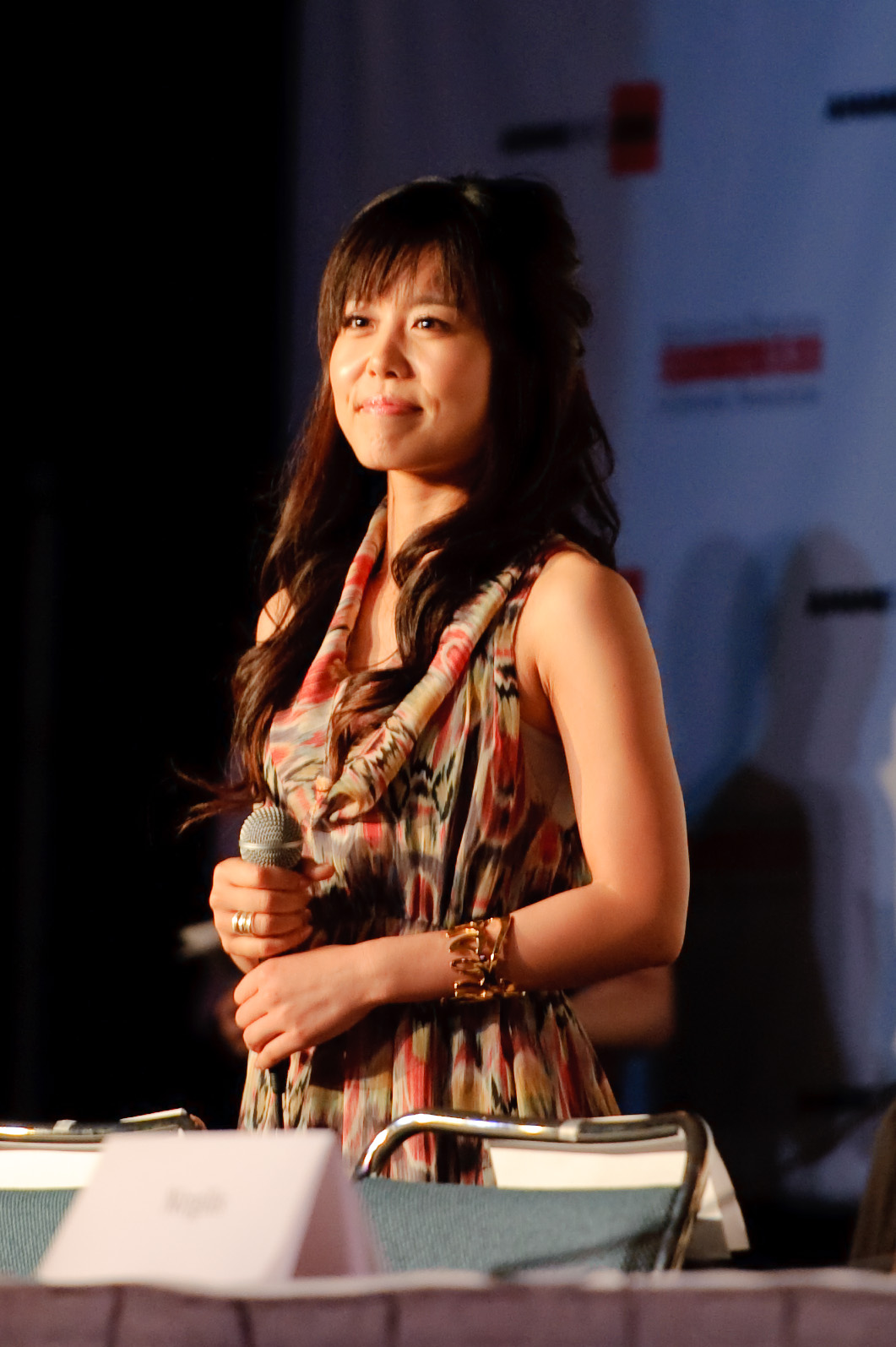
- Sawashiro at Anime Expo in 2011
- Born: June 2, 1985 (age 41); Nagano Prefecture, Japan
- Occupations: Actress; voice actress; narrator
- Years active: 1999–present
- Agent: Aoni Production
- Spouse: Undisclosed (m. 2014)
- Children: 1
- Relatives: Chiharu Sawashiro (brother)

Miyuki Sawashiro (沢城 みゆき, Sawashiro Miyuki; born June 2, 1985) is a Japanese actress and narrator. She has played voice roles in a number of Japanese anime/games including Beelzebub, Bishamon in Noragami, Petit Charat/Puchiko in Di Gi Charat, Mint in Galaxy Angel, Sinon in Sword Art Online II, Twilight/Towa Akagi/Cure Scarlet in Go! Princess Precure, Dlanor A. Knox in Umineko: When They Cry, Izuna Hatsuse in No Game, No Life, Amagi in Azur Lane, Celty Sturluson in Durarara!!, Kurapika in Hunter × Hunter, Raiden Mei and Dr. Mei in Honkai Impact 3 and Gun Girl Z, Raiden Shogun/Raiden Ei in Genshin Impact, Acheron in Honkai: Star Rail, Toko Fukawa in Danganronpa, Akane Kurashiki in Zero Escape, Ayane Yano in Kimi ni Todoke, Fujiko Mine in later installments of Lupin the Third, Queen in Mysterious Joker, Jun Sasada in Natsume's Book of Friends, Shinku in Rozen Maiden, Haruka Nanami in Uta no Prince-sama, Kotoha Isone in Yozakura Quartet, Kanbaru Suruga in Bakemonogatari, Saber of Red/Mordred in Fate/Apocrypha, Elizabeth and Chidori in Persona 3, Catherine in Catherine, Ivy Valentine in Soulcalibur, Jolyne Cujoh in JoJo's Bizarre Adventure: All Star Battle and JoJo's Bizarre Adventure: Eyes of Heaven, Wizard Cookie in Cookie Run: Kingdom, Kirari Momobami in Kakegurui, Ho'olheyak in Arknights and Rosetta in Punishing: Gray Raven.

== Biography ==
Miyuki Sawashiro was born on June 2, 1985. She has a younger brother named Chiharu Sawashiro who is also a voice actor.

She participated in voice actor auditions for Di Gi Charat on May 2, 1999, and won the Special Jury Prize. During her time in high school, she stayed in the American state of Pennsylvania, where she participated in a homestay program to learn English. She takes time off to practice English when she is not busy with voiceover work.

She voiced Puchiko in the English dubbed release of Leave it to Piyoko for Episodes 1-6 before being replaced by Karen Strassman, making her the first and one of the few Japanese voice actors to have reprised a role in English in addition to the original Japanese performance. She could not record for the English dub of the Di Gi Charat TV series due to a scheduling conflict.

She was affiliated with Mausu Promotion since the start of her voice acting career until August 2015 when she became affiliated with Aoni Production.

== Personal life ==
Sawashiro announced her marriage in 2014. In 2018, her fellow voice actress Mayumi Tanaka announced that Sawashiro had successfully given birth to her first child.

== Filmography ==
=== Television animation ===
Year	Title	Role	Other notes
1999	Di Gi Charat	Puchiko/Petit Charat	Theme Song Performance (ED)
2000	Di Gi Charat Summer Special	Petit Charat/Puchiko	Theme Song Performance (ED)
2000	Di Gi Charat Christmas Special	Petit Charat/Puchiko	Theme Song Performance (ED)
2001	Di Gi Charat – A Trip to the Planet	Puchiko/Petit Charat	Theme Song Performance (ED)
2001	Di Gi Charat Ohanami Special	Puchiko/Petit Charat	Theme Song Performance (ED)
2001	Di Gi Charat Natsuyasumi Special	Petit Charat	Theme Song Performance (ED)
2001	Galaxy Angel	Mint Blancmanche, Puchiko (Ep. 17), Yurippe (Ep. 18)	Theme Song Performance (OP/ED)
2001	Shiawase Sou no Okojo-san	Kojopii	
2001	Kokoro Library	Iina, Kokoro Shindou (Ep. 11)	
2002	Panyo Panyo Di Gi Charat	Petit Charat/Puchiko	Theme Song Performance (ED)
2002	Galaxy Angel Z	Mint Blancmanche, Pint	Theme Song Performance (OP/ED)
2002	Pita-Ten	Kotarou Higuchi	Theme Song Performance (ED)
2002	Princess Tutu	Lamp Spirit	Episode 5
2002	Galaxy Angel A	Mint Blancmanche	Theme Song Performance (OP/ED)
2002	Shootfighter Tekken	Akemi Takaishi	
2003	Leave it to Piyoko!	Puchiko	2007 English Dub
2003	Wolf's Rain	Alchemist C	Episode 26
2003	Kaleido Star	Sophie Oswald	
2003	Di Gi Charat Nyo!	Petit Charat/Puchiko (Cappuccino)	Theme Song Performance (OP 2–3, ED 2–5)
2003	Please Twins!	Yuuka Yashiro	
2003	Cromartie High School	Puchiko	Episode 25
2003	The Galaxy Railways	Berga (Ep. 9), Rifl (Ep. 21)	
2003	Peacemaker	Hotaru	
2003	Galaxy Angel S	Mint Blancmanche	
2004	Saiyuki Gunlock	Child	Episode 10
2004	Keroro Gunso	Girl	Episode 20
2004	Legendz: Yomigaeru Ryuuou Densetsu	English A/Treasurer	
2004	Rozen Maiden	Shinku	
2004	Galaxy Angel X	Mint Blancmanche	Theme Song Performance (OP/ED 2)
2004	DearS	Khi	
2004	Viewtiful Joe	Amy	Episode 19
2004	Gunbuster 2	Tycho Science	
2005	Fighting Fantasy Girl Rescue Me: Mave-chan	Two-chan	
2005	Best Student Council	Mayura Ichikawa	Theme Song Performance (ED)
2005	Basilisk	Hotarubi, Ogen (young)	
2005	D.C.S.S. ~Da Capo Second Season~	Kanae Kudou	
2005	Pani Poni Dash!	Akane Serizawa	
2005	Full Metal Panic! The Second Raid	Xia Yu Lan	
2005	Hell Girl	Kanako Sakuragi	Episode 23
2005	Solty Rei	Mii	
2005	Onegai My Melody	Kakeru Kogure	
2005	My-Otome	Sara Gallagher	
2005	Rozen Maiden: Träumend	Shinku	
2005	Mushishi	Ginko (younger, Ep. 26), Yoki (Ep. 12)	
2005	Ojarumaru	Damae	
2006	Kagihime Monogatari: Eikyū Alice Rondo	Lorina Lilina	Episodes 9 and 13
2006	Rakugo Tennyo Oyui	Tae Yanaka	
2006	Glass Fleet	Gouda (John-Fall's subordinate), Michel (brother) (10 years old)	
2006	Hime-sama Goyōjin	Sobana Kana	
2006	Otogi-Jushi Akazukin	Ibara-hime	Theme Song Performance (ED2)
2006	Welcome to the NHK	Yuu Kusano	
2006	Black Blood Brothers	Cassandra Jill Warlock	
2006	Galaxy Angel Rune	Mint Blancmanche	Episode 7
2006	Red Garden	Claire Forrest	
2006	Ghost Hunt	Kuroda	Episodes 1–3
2006	Negima!?	Nekane Springfield, Shichimi	Theme Song Performance (OP8)
2006	My-Otome Zwei	Sara Gallagher	
2006	Rozen Maiden: Ouvertüre	Shinku	
2006	Utawarerumono	Aruru	
2006	Winter Garden	Petit Charat/Puchiko (Cappuccino)	
2007	Strike Witches	Perrine-H. Clostermann	
2007	Les Misérables: Shōjo Cosette	Beatrice	
2007	Hidamari Sketch	Announcer (Ep. 7), Landlady	
2007	Nodame Cantabile	Female student B (Ep. 3), Shinichi Chiaki (young)	
2007	Heroic Age	Rekti Rekuu	
2007	Kishin Taisen Gigantic Formula	Kana Kamishiro	
2007	Bakugan Battle Brawlers	Jenny/Kani, Chan Lee	
2007	Kamichama Karin	Kazune Kujyou	
2007	Sky Girls	Yuuki Sakurano	
2007	Sayonara Zetsubō Sensei	Maria Tarō Sekiutsu	Theme Song Performance (OP)
2007	Naruto Shippūden	Shizuku	
2007	Blue Drop: Tenshi-tachi no Gikyoku	Hagino Senkōji	
2007	Suteki Tantei Labyrinth	Mayuki Hyūga	
2007	Dragonaut -The Resonance-	Akira Souya, Laura	
2007	Goshūshō-sama Ninomiya-kun	Reika Hōjō	Theme Song Performance (OP/ED)
2007	Shugo Chara!	Yoru, Shōta (Ep. 34), X-Chara/X-Egg, X-Diamond/Impurified Diamond, Yū Nikaidō (young), Ikuto Tsukiyomi (young)	
2007	Appleseed: Ex Machina	Hitomi	
2008	Zoku Sayonara Zetsubō Sensei	Maria Tarō Sekiutsu	Theme Song Performance (OP/ED)
2008	Persona -trinity soul-	Jun Kanzato, Yuki Kanzato (Ep. 20), Ryō Kanzato (child, Ep. 15)	
2008	Kure-nai	Shinkurō Kurenai	
2008	Wagaya no Oinarisama.	Zashiko Warashiko	Episode 12
2008	Glass Maiden	Kirie	
2008	Library War	Asako Shibasaki	
2008	Chiko, Heiress of the Phantom Thief	Nozomi Kayama	
2008	Hidamari Sketch × 365	Landlady	
2008	Strike Witches	Perrine-H. Clostermann	Theme Song Performance (ED7, ED9, ED11, ED12)
2008	Antique Bakery	Kidnapped Child	Episode 11
2008	Natsume Yūjin-Chō	Jun Sasada, Female High School Student (Ep. 10), Female relative (Ep. 1)	
2008	World Destruction: Sekai Bokumetsu no Rokunin	Maaya	Episode 7
2008	Time of Eve	Chie	
2008	Hakushaku to Yōsei	Jimmy	Episodes 8–12
2008	Yozakura Quartet	Kotoha Isone	
2008	Linebarrels of Iron	Satoru Yamashita	
2008	Kannagi: Crazy Shrine Maidens	Tsugumi Aoba, Jin Mikuriya (young)	
2008	Shugo Chara!! Doki—	Yoru, Nazotama	
2008	Nodame Cantabile: Paris	Chiaki Shinichi (childhood)	
2008	Touhou Musou Kakyou	Marisa Kirisame	
2009	CANAAN	Canaan	
2009	Tatakau Shisho	Mirepoc	
2009	Tegami Bachi	Lag Seeing	
2009	Phantom: Requiem for the Phantom	Drei/Cal Devens	
2009	Tears to Tiara	Lidia/Lydia	
2009	Zoku Natsume Yūjin-Chō	Jun Sasada	
2009	Bakemonogatari	Suruga Kanbaru	Theme Song Performance (OP) Episodes 6-8
2009	Zan Sayonara Zetsubō Sensei	Maria Tarō Sekiutsu	
2009	Kokoro Library: Communication Clips	Iina	
2009	Maria Holic	Dorm Leader	
2009	Kimi ni Todoke	Ayane Yano	
2009	Fairy Tail	Ultear Milkovich, Virgo, Ur	
2009	Umi Monogatari: Anata ga Ite Kureta Koto	Kojima	
2009	Jewelpet	Chite, Labra, Opal	
2009	GA Geijutsuka Art Design Class	Tomokane, Tomokane's older brother	
2010	Angel Beats!	Masami Iwasawa	
2010	Arakawa Under the Bridge	Maria	Theme Song Performance
2010	Bakugan Battle Brawlers New Vestroia	Chan Lee	
2010	Black Rock Shooter	Yomi Takanashi/Dead Master	
2010	Durarara!!	Celty Sturluson	
2010	Highschool of the Dead	Saeko Busujima	
2010	Nurarihyon no Mago	Yosuzume	
2010	Tantei Opera Milky Holmes	Tsugiko Zenigata	
2010	Strike Witches 2	Perrine-H. Clostermann	
2010	The Legend of the Legendary Heroes	Carne Kywell	
2010	Tegami Bachi Reverse	Lag Seeing	
2011	Doraemon: Nobita and the New Steel Troops—Winged Angels	Riruru	
2011	Horizon in the Middle of Nowhere	Masazumi Honda	
2011	Beelzebub	Kaiser de Emperana Beelzebub IV	
2011	Kimi ni Todoke 2nd Season	Ayane Yano	
2011	Gosick	Cordelia Gallo	
2011	A Channel	Taki Kamate	
2011	Softenni	Amachi Leo	
2011	Deadman Wonderland	Toto Sakigami	
2011	Uta no Prince-sama Maji Love 1000%	Haruka Nanami	
2011	The Mystic Archives of Dantalian	Dalian	
2011	Maria Holic: Alive	Dorm Leader	
2011	Gintama	Blue-Reiko	
2011	Hunter × Hunter	Kurapika	2011 TV Series
2011	Kamisama Dolls	Kuuko Karahari	
2011	Lupin III: Blood Seal – Eternal Mermaid	Fujiko Mine	
2011	Mayo Chiki!	Kosame Samejima	
2011	Last Exile ~Fam, The Silver Wing~	Liliana il Grazioso Merlo Turan	
2012	A Channel +smile	Taki Kamate	
2012	AKB0048	Maeda Atsuko The 13th/Acchan/Katagiri Atsuko	
2012	Black Rock Shooter	Yomi Takanashi/Dead Master	
2012	Blast of Tempest	Hakaze Kusaribe	
2012	Btooom!	Kosuke Kira	
2012	Horizon in the Middle of Nowhere 2nd Season	Masazumi Honda	
2012	Jinrui wa Suitaishimashita	Y	
2012	Inazuma Eleven GO 2: Chrono Stone	Shuu	
2012	K	Seri Awashima	
2012	Kokoro Connect	Himeko Inaba	
2012	Lupin the Third: The Woman Called Fujiko Mine	Fujiko Mine	
2012	Medaka Box Abnormal	Naze Youka/Kujira Kurokami	
2012	Moyashimon Returns	Marie	
2012	Natsuiro Kiseki	Suzuka Aizawa	
2012	Nisemonogatari	Suruga Kanbaru	
2012	Psycho-Pass	Shion Karanomori	
2012	Senki Zesshō Symphogear	Ryoko Sakurai, Finé	
2012	Space Brothers	Serika Itō, Young Mutta	
2012	Touhou Musou Kakyou 2	Marisa Kirisame	
2012	Tonari no Kaibutsu-kun	Yuuzan Yoshida	Child version
2013	AKB0048 Next Stage	Maeda Atsuko The 13th/Acchan/Katagiri Atsuko	
2013	Devil Survivor 2: The Animation	Makoto Sako	
2013	Majestic Prince	Rin Suzukaze	
2013	Maoyu	Female Knight	
2013	Monogatari Series Second Season	Suruga Kanbaru	
2013	Photo Kano	Tomoe Misumi	
2013	Senki Zesshō Symphogear G	Finé	
2013	Stella Women's Academy, High School Division Class C3	Sonora Kashima	
2013	Uta no Prince-sama Maji Love 2000%	Haruka Nanami	
2013	Danganronpa: The Animation	Toko Fukawa/Genocider Syo	
2013	Rozen Maiden: Zurückspulen	Shinku	
2013	BlazBlue Alter Memory	Carl Clover	
2013	Yozakura Quartet: Hana no Uta	Kotoha Isone	
2014	Noragami	Bishamon	
2014	Witch Craft Works	Medusa	
2014	Wildernuts	Tuchi	
2014	Z/X Ignition	Ayase Kamiyugi	
2014	Fūun Ishin Dai Shogun	Hōkōin	
2014	Hero Bank	Mitsuo Zaizen	
2014	No Game No Life	Izuna Hatsuse	Episodes 8-12
2014	Hanamonogatari	Suruga Kanbaru	Theme Song Performance (OP)
2014	Sword Art Online II	Sinon/Shino Asada	
2014	Tenkai Knights	Gen Inukai	
2014	Space Dandy	Catherine	
2014	Monthly Girls' Nozaki-kun	Yuzuki Seo	
2014	Rage of Bahamut: Genesis	Rita	
2014	Lady Jewelpet	younger Cayenne, Levin, Boot, Lecter/Joker	
2014	Parasyte	Kana Kimishima	
2014	Mushishi: Next Passage	Yoki	
2014	Kaito Joker	Queen	
2014	Psycho Pass 2	Shion Karanomori	
2015	Durarara!!x2 Shou	Celty Sturluson	
2015	Durarara!!x2 Ten	Celty Sturluson	
2015	Blood Blockade Battlefront	Vivian	
2015	Ghost in the Shell: Arise – Alternative Architecture	Logicoma	
2015	Gunslinger Stratos: The Animation	Remy Ohdner	
2015	Uta no Prince-sama Maji Love Revolutions	Haruka Nanami	
2015	Go! Princess Precure	Towa Akagi/Twilight/Cure Scarlet	
2015	Chaos Dragon	Eiha	
2015	Yamada-kun and the Seven Witches	Leona Miyamura	
2015	Rokka no Yuusha	Narrator	Adlet Mayer as a child, Episode 6
2015	K: Return of Kings	Seri Awashima	
2015	Noragami Aragoto	Bishamon	
2015	Charlotte	Sara Shane	
2015	Wakakozake	Wakako Murasaki	
2015	One-Punch Man	Mosquito Girl	Episode 2
2015	Owarimonogatari	Suruga Kanbaru	
2015	Lupin the Third: Jigen's Gravestone	Fujiko Mine	
2015	Lupin the Third Part 4	Fujiko Mine	
2016	Durarara!!x2 Ketsu	Celty Sturluson	
2016	Lupin III: The Italian Game	Fujiko Mine	
2016	Twin Star Exorcists	Subaru Mitejima	
2016	Uta no Prince-sama Maji LOVE Legend Star	Haruka Nanami	
2016	Berserk	Luca	
2016	ReLIFE	Kokoro Amatsu	
2016	Danganronpa 3: The End of Hope's Peak High School	Touko Fukawa/Genocider Sho	
2016	Kiss Him, Not Me	Shima Nishina	
2016	Show by Rock!!#	Victorious	
2016	Natsume Yūjin-Chō Go	Jun Sasada	
2016	Occultic;Nine	Aria Kurenaino	
2017	Schoolgirl Strikers: Animation Channel	Io Yaginuma	
2017	Beyblade Burst God	Kristina Kuroda	
2017	Granblue Fantasy The Animation	Katalina	
2017	Berserk	Slan	
2017	Kyoukai no RINNE	Hitomi Annette Anematsuri	
2017	One Piece	Charlotte Pudding	
2017	Kakegurui	Kirari Momobami, Ririka Momobami	
2017	Fate/Apocrypha	Saber of Red/Mordred	
2017	Konbini Kareshi	Kokona Minowa	
2017	Gabriel DropOut	Tenma White Zeruel	
2017	Elegant Yokai Apartment Life	Akine Kuga	
2018	GeGeGe no Kitarō	Kitarō	
2018	Devils' Line	Juliana Lloyd	
2018	Wotakoi: Love is Hard for Otaku	Hanako Koyanagi	
2018	Mr. Tonegawa: Middle Management Blues	Zawa Voice (002)	Episodes 13, 17, 20, 22
2018	Beyblade Burst Super Z	Kristina Kuroda	
2018	Sword Art Online: Alicization	Sinon/Shino Asada	
2019	Kakegurui XX	Kirari Momobami, Ririka Momobami	
2019	Fruits Basket	Kyōko Honda	
2019	Strike Witches 501st Unit, Taking Off!	Perrine-H. Clostermann	
2019	Granblue Fantasy The Animation Season 2	Katalina	
2019	Azur Lane	Amagi	
2020	Sakura Wars the Animation	Hakushu Murasame	
2020	Princess Connect! Re:Dive	Labyrista/Akira Mosakuji	
2020	Our Last Crusade or the Rise of a New World	Elletear Lou Nebulis IX	
2021	Detective Conan	Seiji Asoh	
2021	Hortensia Saga	Sharo D'Hortensia	
2021	Mars Red	Defrott	
2021	Dragon Goes House-Hunting	Cassandra	
2021	Remake Our Life!	Misaki Kanō	
2021	Edens Zero	Valkyrie Yuna	
2021	Digimon Ghost Game	Gammamon	
2021	Lupin the 3rd Part 6	Fujiko Mine	
2021	Demon Slayer: Kimetsu no Yaiba – Entertainment District Arc	Daki	
2022	Love After World Domination	Kira Sanzugawa	
2022	Utawarerumono: Mask of Truth	Aruru	
2022	Call of the Night	Anko Uguisu	
2022	Reiwa no Di Gi Charat	Petit Charat	
2022	Urusei Yatsura	Sakura	
2023	Malevolent Spirits: Mononogatari	Haori	
2023	The Fruit of Evolution 2	Destra	
2023	Chibi Godzilla Raids Again	Chibi Biollante	
2023	Shy	Tzveta	
2024	The Fable	Yōko Satō	
2024	Bye Bye, Earth	Doranvi	
2024	Girls Band Cry	Mine	
2025	Ameku M.D.: Doctor Detective	Junko Sumida	
2025	BanG Dream! Ave Mujica	Minami Mori	
2025	Witch Watch	Ibara Ibu	
2025	Dusk Beyond the End of the World	Yoiyami	
Kuroshitsuji: Emerald Witch Arc	Lord Ciel Phantomhive/Another Ciel		
2026	Journal with Witch	Makio Kōdai	
2026	Dark Machine: The Animation	Rudora	
2026	Suikoden: The Anime	Anabelle	
2027	Within the Villainess	Remilia Rose Graupner	

=== Original net animation (ONA) ===
Year	Title	Role	Other notes
2017	The King of Fighters: Destiny	Angelina	
2020	Dragon's Dogma	Olivia	
2022	Jewelpet Attack Travel!	Labra	
2023	Lupin the 3rd vs. Cat's Eye	Fujiko Mine	
2024	Kimi ni Todoke 3rd Season	Ayane Yano	
2024	Monogatari Off & Monster Season	Suruga Kanbaru	
2025	Yu-Gi-Oh! Card Game The Chronicles	Fleurdelis	
2021–present	Record of Ragnarok	Brunhild	

=== Original video animation (OVA) ===
Year	Title	Role	Other notes
2003	Aquarian Age: The Movie	Reina Arcturus	
2005	Naruto	Garrod Ran (female version)	
2013–16	Ghost in the Shell: Arise	Logicoma	
2013	Corpse Party: Tortured Souls	Yui Shishido	
2015	Mobile Suit Gundam: The Origin	Crowley Hamon	

=== Theatrical animation ===
Year	Title	Role	Other notes
2002	éX-Driver The Movie	Angela Ganbino	
2007	Naruto Shippuden the Movie	Shizuku	
2011	Doraemon: Nobita and the New Steel Troops—Winged Angels	Riruru	
2011	Inazuma Eleven GO: Kyūkyoku no Kizuna Gurifon	Shuu	
2012	Evangelion: 3.0 You Can (Not) Redo	Sakura Suzuhara	
2013	Hunter × Hunter: Phantom Rouge	Kurapika	
2013	Space Pirate Captain Harlock	Kei Yuki	
2013	Bayonetta: Bloody Fate	Cereza	
2013	Persona 3 The Movie: No. 1, Spring of Birth	Elizabeth	
2013	Lupin the 3rd vs. Detective Conan: The Movie	Fujiko Mine	
2013	Hunter × Hunter: The Last Mission	Kurapika	
2014	Persona 3 The Movie: No. 2, Midsummer Knight's Dream	Elizabeth, Chidori Yoshino	
2014	Inazuma Eleven: Chou Jigen Dream Match	Shuu	
2014	K: Missing Kings	Seri Awashima	
2015	Psycho-Pass: The Movie	Shion Karanomori	
2015	Ghost in the Shell: The New Movie	Logicoma	
2015	Go! Princess Precure the Movie: Go! Go!! Splendid Triple Feature!!!	Towa Akagi/Cure Scarlet	
2015	Harmony	Tuan Kirie	
2016	Pretty Cure All Stars: Singing with Everyone Miraculous Magic!	Towa Akagi/Cure Scarlet	
2017	Sword Art Online The Movie: Ordinal Scale	Sinon/Shino Asada	
2017	Pretty Cure Dream Stars!	Towa Akagi/Cure Scarlet	
2017	Crayon Shin-chan: Invasion!! Alien Shiriri	Shiriri	
2017	No Game No Life: Zero	Izuna Hatsuse	
2018	Maquia: When the Promised Flower Blooms	Rashine	
2018	Natsume's Book of Friends the Movie: Tied to the Temporal World	Jun Sasada	
2019	Human Lost	Madam	
2019	Lupin III: The First	Fujiko Mine	
2020	Fate/Grand Order: Camelot – Wandering; Agaterám	Mordred	
2020	Kono Sekai no Tanoshimikata: Secret Story Film	Rei Tamura	
2022	Fruits Basket: Prelude	Kyōko Honda	
2023	Gold Kingdom and Water Kingdom	Lailala	
2023	Black Clover: Sword of the Wizard King	Princia	
2023	City Hunter The Movie: Angel Dust	Angie	
2023	Birth of Kitarō: The Mystery of GeGeGe	Kitarō and his mother	
2025	The Rose of Versailles	Oscar François de Jarjayes	
2026	Detective Conan: Fallen Angel of the Highway	Chihaya Hagiwara	
2026	The Apothecary Diaries: The Late Lady's Treasure	Ruoqing	
2026	Armored Trooper VOTOMS: Die Graue Hexe	Ash Vamps	

=== Video games ===
Year	Title	Role	Other notes
2002	Utawarerumono	Aruruu	
2005	Galaxy Angel EX	Mint Blancmanche	
2006	Rozen Maiden: Duellwalzer	Shinku	
2006	Persona 3	Elizabeth, Chidori	
2006	Shinseiki GPX Cyber Formula: Road to the Infinity 3	Rei Kanna	
2006	Super Swing Golf	Nell	
2007	Odin Sphere	Velvet	
2007	Higurashi When They Cry	Miyuki Akasaka	
2007	Mana Khemia: Alchemists of Al-Revis	Nicole Mimi Tithel	
2007	Angel Profile	Yulius	
2007	Ar tonelico II: Melody of Metafalica	Cloche Leythal Pastalia	
2007	Tales of Innocence	Sian Tenebro	
2008	Yggdra Union: We'll Never Fight Alone	Milanor	
2008	Fatal Frame IV	Misaki Asō	
2008	BlazBlue: Calamity Trigger	Carl Clover	
2008	The Last Remnant	Hannah/Hinnah	
2008	CR Galaxy Angel	Mint Blancmanche	
2008	Rune Factory Frontier	Uzuki	
2009	Street Fighter IV	Cammy, Decapre (Ultra)	Also Super and Ultra
2009	Corpse Seed 2	Honoka Yamato	Also Corpse Seed 2: Burning Gluttony
2009	Star Ocean: The Last Hope	Lymle Lemuri Phi	
2009	Atelier Annie: Alchemists of Sera Island	Pepe	
2009	Oboro Muramasa	Momohime	
2009	Grandia Online	Colta Female	
2009	Sin & Punishment: Star Successor	Hibaru Yaju	
2009	BlazBlue: Continuum Shift	Carl Clover	
2009	Phantasy Star Portable 2	Yut Jun Yunkers	
2009	Luminous Arc 3	Inarna	
2010	Zangeki no Reginleiv	Brynhild	
2010	Super Robot Taisen OG Saga: Endless Frontier Exceed	Cleo Gretel and Gerda Miroir	
2010	Corpse Party	Yui Shishido	
2010	Another Century's Episode R	Autumn	
2010	Koumajou Densetsu II: Stranger's Requiem	Sakuya Izayoi	Also the remastered version of Koumajou Densetsu: Scarlet Symphony
2010	Danganronpa: Trigger Happy Havoc	Toko Fukawa/Genocide Jack/Jill	
2010	Arcana Heart 3	Weiss	
2011	Catherine	Catherine	Also Full Body
2011	Rune Factory: Tides of Destiny	Azel	
2011	Way of the Samurai 4	Mayu Kinugawa	
2011	Shin Megami Tensei: Devil Survivor 2	Makoto Sako	
2011	Black Rock Shooter: The Game	Nana Grey	
2011	Tales of Xillia	Milla Maxwell	
2011	League of Legends	Riven	
2011	Final Fantasy Type-0	Sice	Also HD
2011	Instant Brain	Kuroe Jakou	
2011	7th Dragon 2020	Miroku	
2011	Everybody's Golf 6	Xiao Ling	
2011	Golden Fantasia Cross	Dlanor A. Knox	
2011	Umineko no Naku Koro ni Chiru: Shinjitsu to Gensō no Nocturne	Dlanor A. Knox	
2012	Dragon Age II	Hawke	Japanese dub
2012	Granado Espada	Natalie	
2012	Soulcalibur V	Ivy Valentine	
2012	Genso Suikoden: Tsumugareshi Hyakunen no Toki	Makia Zaphir	
2012	Zero Escape: Virtue's Last Reward	Akane	
2012	Persona 4 Arena	Elizabeth	
2012	Street Fighter X Tekken	Cammy	
2012	Chaos Rings II	Conor Whelan	
2012	Fire Emblem Awakening	Avatar (Female), Morgan (Female)	
2012	Anarchy Reigns	Rin Rin	
2012	Digimon World Re:Digitize	Mikagura Mirei	Also Digitize Decode
2012	Time Travelers	Mikoto Shindo	
2012	Tokyo Babel	Lilis	
2012	Sol Trigger	Littler	
2012	Tales of Xillia 2	Milla Maxwell	
2012	BlazBlue: Chrono Phantasma	Carl Clover	
2012	E.X. Troopers	Julie Fliesher	
2013	Kritika Online	Rogue	
2013	Metal Gear Rising: Revengeance	Courtney Collins	
2013	Super Robot Wars UX	Satoru Yamashita	
2013	Sword Art Online: Infinity Moment	Sinon	
2013	7th Dragon 2020-II	Miroku	
2013	BioShock Infinite	Elizabeth	Japanese dub
2013	Dragon's Dogma: Dark Arisen	Mercedes	
2013	Summon Night 5	Ouleng	
2013	Kamen Rider: Battride War	Kiva-la, Canaria/Rie Kanai	
2013	Shin Megami Tensei IV	Isabeau and Medusa	
2013	Final Fantasy XIV: A Realm Reborn	Minfilia	
2013	JoJo's Bizarre Adventure: All Star Battle	Jolyne Cujoh	
2013	Killer Is Dead	Moon River	
2013	Hyperdimension Neptunia Re;Birth 1	Broccoli	
2013	Persona 4 Arena Ultimax	Elizabeth	
2014	Guns Girl School Dayz	Raiden Mei	on version 1.5
2014	Sengoku Basara 4	Kyōgoku Maria	
2014	Super Heroine Chronicle	Petit Charat	
2014	Granblue Fantasy	Katalina	
2014	J-Stars Victory VS	Baby Beel	
2014	Hyperdimension Neptunia Re;Birth 2	Broccoli	
2014	Sword Art Online: Hollow Fragment	Sinon	
2014	Persona Q: Shadow of the Labyrinth	Elizabeth	
2014	Murdered: Soul Suspect	Abigail	
2014	Super Smash Bros. for Nintendo 3DS and Wii U	Robin (Female)	
2014	Bayonetta (Wii U version)	Cereza	Japanese dub
2014	Danganronpa Another Episode: Ultra Despair Girls	Toko Fukawa/Genocide Jack	
2014	Tales of the World: Reve Unitia	Milla Maxwell	
2014	Onechanbara Z2: Chaos	Saaya/Kagura	
2014	Age of Ishtaria	Meru	
2014	Left 4 Dead: Survivors	Sara Kirishima	
2014	Shining Resonance	Marion	
2014	Hyperdimension Neptunia Re;Birth 3	Broccoli	
2015	Dragon Quest: Heroes	Maya Mahabala	
2015	Digimon Story: Cyber Sleuth	Mirei Mikagura	
2015	Yakuza 0	Makoto Makimura	Also Director's Cut
2015	Sword Art Online: Lost Song	Sinon	
2015	The Witcher 3: Wild Hunt	Cirilla	Japanese dub
2015	Fire Emblem Fates	Camilla	
2015	Sengoku Basara 4: Sumeragi	Kyōgoku Maria	
2015	Fate/Grand Order	Artemis, Mordred, Nightingale, Rama	
2015	Until Dawn	Samantha "Sam"	Japanese dub
2015	7th Dragon III Code: VFD	Allie Nodens	
2015	BlazBlue: Central Fiction	Carl Clover	
2015	Lost Reavers	Victoria	
2015	JoJo's Bizarre Adventure: Eyes of Heaven	Jolyne Cujoh	
2016	Elsword	Chung	
2016	League of Legends	Miss Fortune	Japanese Client
2016	Shin Megami Tensei IV: Apocalypse	Isabeau and Medusa	
2016	Street Fighter V	Cammy, Decapre	
2016	Digimon World: Next Order	Mirei Mikagura	Also International Edition
2016	Final Fantasy XV	Aranea Highwind	
2016	Skullgirls 2nd Encore	Squigly	Japanese dub
2016	Dragon Quest Heroes II	Maya Mahabala	
2016	Mighty No. 9	Dynatron	
2016	Zero Escape: Zero Time Dilemma	Akane Kurashiki	
2016	Tales of Berseria	Milla Maxwell	
2016	Dragon Ball Xenoverse 2	Female Time Patroller	
2016	World of Final Fantasy	Quistis Trepe	
2016	Sword Art Online: Hollow Realization	Sinon	
2017	Counter-Strike Online 2	Choi Ji Yoon and Mila	Japanese dub
2017	Fire Emblem Heroes	Camilla, Robin (Female), Morgan (Female)	
2017	Honkai Impact 3rd	Raiden Mei	Android, iOS
2017	Onmyoji	Sanbi no Kitsune, Yao Bikuni	Android, iOS
2017	Fire Emblem Warriors	Camilla, Robin (Female)	
2017	Itadaki Street: Dragon Quest and Final Fantasy 30th Anniversary	Minfilia	
2017	Yakuza Kiwami 2	Makoto Makimura	
2017	Kirara Fantasia	Archive	
2017–21	Dissidia Final Fantasy Opera Omnia	Quistis Trepe, Agrias Oaks, Aranea Highwind, Sice	
2017	Digimon Story: Cyber Sleuth – Hacker's Memory	Mirei Mikagura	
2018	Azur Lane	IJN Amagi, HMS Monarch, IJN Tosa, Dead Master	
2018	Sword Art Online: Fatal Bullet	Sinon	
2018	Princess Connect! Re:Dive	Akira Mosakuji/Labyrista	
2018	Fist of the North Star: Lost Paradise	Xsana	PS4
2018	The Caligula Effect: Overdose	Protagonist (Female)	
2018	Soulcalibur VI	Ivy Valentine	
2018	Persona Q2: New Cinema Labyrinth	Elizabeth	
2018	Super Smash Bros. Ultimate	Robin (Female)	
2019	Another Eden	Anabel	iOS/Android
2019	Jump Force	Kurapika	
2019	Magia Record	Suruga Kanbaru and Elisa Celjska	iOS/Android
2019	Dragon Quest XI S: Echoes of an Elusive Age – Definitive Edition	Krystalinda	Japanese dub
2019	Granblue Fantasy Versus	Katalina	
2019	BlazBlue: Cross Tag Battle	Elizabeth	Added in 2.0 update
2019	Punishing: Gray Raven	Rosetta	
2019	Sakura Wars	Hakushu Murasame	
2020	Olympia Soiree	Shura Daishi	
2020	Tetote Connect	Fiel	
2021	Cookie Run: Kingdom	Wizard Cookie	Japanese dub
2021	Genshin Impact	Raiden Ei/Raiden Shogun/Raiden Makoto	Japanese dub
2022	Bravely Default: Brilliant Lights	Lumina	iOS/Android
2022	Teppen	Cammy	
2022	Koumajou Remilia: Scarlet Symphony	Sakuya Izayoi	
2022	Bayonetta 3	Viola, Cereza	
2022	Counter: Side	Gremory	
2023	Bayonetta Origins: Cereza and the Lost Demon	Cereza	
2023	Street Fighter 6	Cammy	
2023	Sword Art Online: Last Recollection	Sinon	
2023	Arknights	Ho'olheyak	
2023	Honkai: Star Rail	Acheron	Japanese dub
2023	Granblue Fantasy Versus: Rising	Katalina	
2023	Koumajou Remilia 2: Stranger's Requiem	Sakuya Izayoi	
2024	Granblue Fantasy: Relink	Katalina	
2024	Persona 3 Reload	Elizabeth, Chidori	
2025	Umamusume: Pretty Derby	Speed Symboli	
2026	Marvel Tokon: Fighting Souls	Storm	

=== Drama CDs ===
Year	Title	Role	Other notes
2006	Gakuen Alice	Hotaru Imai	Released in Hana to Yume magazine
2006	Ludwig Kakumei	Friederike	
2007	Kuroshitsuji	Ciel Phantomhive	
2008	Tindharia no Tane	Parsley	
2009	Rakka Ryūsui	Yū Gojyō	
2009	Kisu Yori mo Hayaku	Teppei Kaji	
2009	Hetalia: Axis Powers volume 2	Young Austria	
2009	Soul Eater	Patricia Thompson	
2009	Hyakumonogatari	Suruga Kanbaru	
2011–2012	Kokoro Connect	Himeko Inaba	
2012	Lupin III – The Woman Called Fujiko Mine	Fujiko Mine	
2012	Sword Art Online	Shino Asada/Sinon	
2014	Like a Butterfly	Aya Shimizu	
2014	7th Dragon 2020 & 2020-II: Tokyo Chronicle	Miroku	
2016	Fate/GUDAGUDA Order	Mordred	
2017	Ascendance of a Bookworm Drama CD 1	Myne/Rozemyne	
2018	7th Dragon III Code: VFD	Allie Nodens	
2018	Ascendance of a Bookworm Drama CD 2	Myne/Rozemyne	

=== Live-action film ===
Year	Title	Role	Other notes
2016	Death Note: Light Up the New World	Arma (voice)	
2018	The Travelling Cat Chronicles	Momo (voice)	

=== Live-action television ===
Year	Title	Role	Other notes
2019	Natsuzora: Natsu's Sky	Chikako Shiramoto	
2025	Anpan	Mukumuku (voice)	

=== Tokusatsu ===
Year	Title	Role	Other notes
2009	Kamen Rider Decade	Kiva-la	Episodes 2-31
2009	Kamen Rider Decade: All Riders vs. Dai-Shocker	Kiva-la	Movie
2009	Kamen Rider × Kamen Rider W & Decade: Movie War 2010	Kiva-la	Movie
2015	Shuriken Sentai Ninninger	Youkai Futakuchi-onna	Episode 15
2023	Ohsama Sentai King-Ohger	Hilbil Leech	Episodes 27-44
2024	Ohsama Sentai King-Ohger vs. Kyoryuger	Hilbil Leech Alternate Timeline	Movie

== Dubbing roles ==
=== Live action ===
Year	Title	Role	Dubbing actor	Other notes	Source
1965	The Sound of Music	Sister Bernice	Evadne Baker	50th Anniversary edition	
1968	Night of the Living Dead	Judy	Judith Ridley	2020 Blu-ray edition	
1985	Back to the Future	Lorraine McFly	Lea Thompson	2025 NTV edition	
1989	Back to the Future Part II	Lorraine Baines-McFly	Lea Thompson	2025 NTV edition	
1990	Back to the Future Part III	Lorraine McFly, Maggie McFly	Lea Thompson	2025 NTV edition	
2004	Harry Potter and the Prisoner of Azkaban	Parvati Patil	Sitara Shah		
2005	Ice Princess	Gen Harwood	Hayden Panettiere		
2005	Harry Potter and the Goblet of Fire	Parvati Patil	Shefali Chowdhury		
2007	Harry Potter and the Order of the Phoenix	Parvati Patil	Shefali Chowdhury		
2008–2009	Kamen Rider: Dragon Knight	Kase/Kamen Rider Siren	Carrie Reichenbach		
2010	Kick-Ass	Mindy MacReady/Hit-Girl	Chloë Grace Moretz		
2010–2019	Luther	Alice Morgan	Ruth Wilson		
2012	Ted	Robert	Aedin Mincks		
2013	Kick-Ass 2	Mindy MacReady/Hit-Girl	Chloë Grace Moretz		
2013	Ender's Game	Bean	Aramis Knight		
2013	The Frozen Ground	Cindy Paulson	Vanessa Hudgens		
2013–2014	The Carrie Diaries	Carrie Bradshaw	AnnaSophia Robb		
2014	Noah	Ila	Emma Watson		
2014	American Heist	Emily	Jordana Brewster		
2014	Kingsman: The Secret Service	Gazelle	Sofia Boutella		
2014	Kite	Jeff	India Eisley		
2015	The Player	Cassandra King	Charity Wakefield		
2015–2016	Scream Queens	Chanel Oberlin	Emma Roberts		
2016	Skiptrace	Leslie	Shi Shi		
2016	The 5th Wave	Cassie Sullivan	Chloë Grace Moretz		
2016	Neighbors 2: Sorority Rising	Shelby	Chloë Grace Moretz		
2016	Always Shine	Anna	Mackenzie Davis		
2016	Gods of Egypt	Hathor	Élodie Yung		
2016	Suicide Squad	Dr. June Moone / Enchantress	Cara Delevingne		
2017	Valerian and the City of a Thousand Planets	Sergeant Laureline	Cara Delevingne		
2017	The Circle	Mae Holland	Emma Watson		
2017	Thor: Ragnarok	Valkyrie	Tessa Thompson		
2017	Genius	Margarita Konenkova	Ania Bukstein		
2017	Journey to the West: The Demons Strike Back	Jiu Gong / Immortal Golden Vulture	Yao Chen		
2017	Legend of the Demon Cat	Chunqin	Kitty Zhang		
2017	Mother!	Mother	Jennifer Lawrence		
2017	The Mummy	Jennifer Halsey	Annabelle Wallis		
2017	Nicky Larson and Cupid's Perfume	Laura Marconi	Élodie Fontan		
2017	Power Rangers	Rita Repulsa	Elizabeth Banks		
2017–2018	Imposters	Maddie Johnson	Inbar Lavi		
2018	Aquaman	Atlanna	Nicole Kidman		
2018	Greta	Frances McCullen	Chloë Grace Moretz		
2019	Aladdin	Dalia	Nasim Pedrad		
2019	Running Wild with Bear Grylls	Cara Delevingne			
2019	Avengers: Endgame	Valkyrie	Tessa Thompson		
2019	Between Two Ferns: The Movie	Herself	Tessa Thompson		
2019	Cats	Rumpleteazer	Naoimh Morgan		
2019	Hobbs & Shaw	Hattie Shaw	Vanessa Kirby		
2019	Dumbo	Colette Marchant	Eva Green		
2019–2020	Crash Landing on You	Yoon Se-ri	Son Ye-jin		
2020	Shadow in the Cloud	Maude Garrett	Chloë Grace Moretz		
2020	Dolittle	Tutu	Marion Cotillard		
2020	The High Note	Maggie Sherwoode	Dakota Johnson		
2020–2022	Raised by Wolves	Mother / Lamia	Amanda Collin		
2021	Resident Evil: Welcome to Raccoon City	Jill Valentine	Hannah John-Kamen		
2021	Mother/Android	Georgia Olsen	Chloë Grace Moretz		
2021	Army of Thieves	Gwendoline	Nathalie Emmanuel		
2021	Oslo	Mona Juul	Ruth Wilson		
2021–2025	And Just Like That...	Lisa Todd Wexley	Nicole Ari Parker		
2022	The Peripheral	Flynne Fisher	Chloë Grace Moretz		
2022	Decision to Leave	Song Seo-rae	Tang Wei		
2022	Thor: Love and Thunder	Valkyrie	Tessa Thompson		
2023	The Marvels	Valkyrie	Tessa Thompson		
2023	Aquaman and the Lost Kingdom	Atlanna	Nicole Kidman		
2023	Barbie	Writer Barbie	Alexandra Shipp		
2023	No Hard Feelings	Maddie Barker	Jennifer Lawrence		
2023	Dreamland	Mel	Lily Allen		
2023	Dungeons & Dragons: Honor Among Thieves	Red Wizard of Thay	Daisy Head		
2023	Rebel Moon	Kora	Sofia Boutella		
2024	Beetlejuice Beetlejuice	Delores	Monica Bellucci		
2024–present	Fallout	Lucy MacLean	Ella Purnell		
2026	Lord of the Flies	Ralph	Winston Sawyers		
2026	Street Fighter	Cammy	Mel Jarnson		

=== Animation ===
Year	Title	Role	Other notes	Source
2010–2019	My Little Pony: Friendship Is Magic	Twilight Sparkle		
2012–2018	Adventure Time	Flame Princess		
2013	Teenage Mutant Ninja Turtles: Mutant Mayhem	Leatherhead		
2014	The Nut Job	Andie		
2014	The Lego Movie	Lucy / Wyldstyle, Unikitty		
2014	Over the Garden Wall	Beatrice		
2016	The Secret Life of Pets	Gidget		
2017	The Lego Batman Movie	Barbara Gordon / Batgirl		
2017	The Lego Ninjago Movie	Misako "Koko"		
2018	Early Man	Goona		
2019	The Lego Movie 2: The Second Part	Lucy / Wyldstyle, Unikitty		
2019	The Queen's Corgi	Wanda		
2019	The Secret Life of Pets 2	Gidget		
2019	The Lion King	Shenzi		
2022	Lightyear	I.V.A.N.		
2022	Oni: Thunder God's Tale	Onari's mother		
2025	Elio	Questa		
2025	Marvel Zombies	Valkyrie		
2026	Toy Story 5	Dolly		
2026	The Cat in the Hat	Sherrie		

== Discography ==
- "Solitary Bullet" (Sword Art Online Character Song as Sinon)
- "Blazing Bullet" (Sword Art Online Character Song as Sinon with Yoshitsugu Matsuoka)
- "Relief Bullet" (Sword Art Online Character Song as Sinon)
- "Onegai☆Snyaiper" (No Game No Life Character Song)
- "Red Concerto" (Go! Princess Precure Character Song)
- "ENDLESS TORCH!" (Go! Princess Precure Character Song)
- "Rouge no Dengon" (Durarara!! Character Song)
- "Break Beat Bark" (Sword Art Online Ordinal Scale Character Song as Sinon with Ayahi Takagaki)
