= Luminous Arc Infinity =

2015 video game

- Japanese game cover
- Developer: Felistella
- Publisher: JP: Marvelous Entertainment
- Producer: Yoshifumi Hashimoto
- Series: Luminous Arc
- Platform: PlayStation Vita
- Release: JP: August 6, 2015
- Genre: Tactical role-playing
- Mode: Single-player

Luminous Arc Infinity (Note: Japanese: ルミナスアーク インフィニティ, Hepburn: Ruminasu Āku Infiniti) is a video game developed by Japanese video game company Felistella for the PlayStation Vita. The game was published by Marvelous Entertainment and released in Japan on August 6, 2015. The game is the fourth entry in the Luminous Arc series, and the first in the series not developed by Imageepoch, who suffered financial troubles around the time of the game's development, ultimately leading to a 2015 bankruptcy filing. While Felistella made changes to the gameplay, it ultimately still retains the core gameplay mechanics of a tactical role-playing game.

== Gameplay ==
The game plays as a tactical role-playing game, with turn based battles taking place on a grid.

== Story ==
The game features multiple endings, based on the player's actions, each one being drastically different from the other.

== Characters ==
Seed (シード, Shīdo) A young keytone specialist from the floating city Floatie. It's hard to see his motivation, and he doesn't show his true feelings to someone else, though his sense of justice is unusually strong. During childhood, his birthplace Floating Castle Fonrex was destroyed, and he was saved and taken to Floatier. He was afflicted by Sand's Curse.

Aqua (アクア, Akua) Seed's foster little sister, a keytone specialist assistant. Her sentiments are very similar to her brother's, though she also has a childish side. By moving the fountain's Lapis found in Floatier, she is able to cure Seed.

Palsh/Pulse (パルス, Parusu) A genius inventor who has become an idol from Barrierbar Kingdom. Very devoted to invention, she won't care about surrounding troubles in order to get the things she is interested in.

Violet (ヴァイオレット, Vaioretto) A witch that has lived for a very long time. Has high magic power and possesses both intellect and beauty. She lives in Radia Ruin.

Brigitta Earl Age (ブリジッタ・アール・アージュ, Burijitta Āru Āju) High Empress of the Earl Age Empire. Received education as a High Empress, she is blessed with both grace and dignity.

Feilang (フェイラン, Feiran) A girl from the Oni clan, hailing from Tao. She has a strong sense of justice. In the Oni clan where it is said that the members lose their human form when doing evil deeds, she is one of the few members that keeps her human form.

Rana (ラナ) A girl living in the Morocca (モロッカ, Morokka) Republic. Shy with strangers, she is also bad at emotional expressions.

Hisoka (ヒソカ) A girl living in Shelvania. Has a cheerful and energetic personality, although she harbors a dark past.

Kasumi (カスミ) A woman who studied all kind of curses in the world. She had previously taught Seed and others as a teacher.

Ziorker/Jioka (ジォーカー, Jiōkā) A quiet knight with a lot of information. Because she has been possessed by a demon, she does not appear old, thus it is hard to identify her as an elderly person just by her looks. In addition, when her demon side comes out, her personality undergoes a drastic change.

C-9 (シーナ, Shīna) Full name Android SX-C9 (アンドロイド・SX-C9). An android produced by Pulse in order to act as a replacement for her mother (Pulse has no family members). She is affectionate towards Pulse, but cold towards other human beings.

Alto (アルト, Aruto) A girl living in Brie Soleil. A hardworker with a cautious personality. Contrary to her boyish look, her movements are bad. Because of her personality, she often inadvertently create a wall to distance herself from others. In addition, she excels in the ability of accurately comprehending the song of the Lapis.

Sopra (ソプラ, Sopura) A girl living in Brie Soleil. A genius, having the very good ability to hear the tune of the Lapis, her motor nerves are good as well. On the other hand, her living skills are bad, if Alto is not there, she might as well can't do anything.

== Development ==
The Luminous Arc series of games started as a trilogy of tactical role-playing games: Luminous Arc, Luminous Arc 2, and Luminous Arc 3. All three entries were developed by Imageepoch, published by Marvelous Entertainment, and released between 2007 and 2009 on the Nintendo DS handheld video game platform. Outside of some rumors of the series moving to the PlayStation Portable, which never materialized, the series laid dormant until 2014. The game was first announced in August 2014, as part of the "Sony Computer Entertainment Japan Asia Press Conference 2014", Sony's pre-Tokyo Game Show conference. However, the game would not be developed by Imageepoch, but rather Felistella, as Imageepoch was going through financial troubles that eventually lead to their closure in 2015. Similarly, Felistella had previously taken over in continuing the Summon Night tactical role-playing game series of games with Summon Night 5, on behalf of Flight-Plan, who had closed in 2012. The game's producer was announced to be Yoshifumi Hashimoto, producer of the Rune Factory series of video games.

The game was released on August 6, 2015 in Japan. The game has not been announced for release in English or any other regions yet.
