= Time and Eternity (video game) =

2012 video game

- North American cover art
- Developer: Imageepoch (Note: Additional development by Paon Corporation. Animation production by Satelight.)
- Publishers: JP: Bandai Namco Games; WW: NIS America
- Director: Tsukasa Toya
- Producers: Kei Hirono; Kensuke Tsukanaka
- Artists: Vofan; Satoshi Maruyama
- Writers: Yoichi Kato; Shoji Masuda
- Composers: Yuzo Koshiro; Takeshi Yanagawa
- Platform: PlayStation 3
- Release: JP: October 11, 2012; EU: June 28, 2013; AU: July 15, 2013; NA: July 16, 2013
- Genre: Role-playing
- Mode: Single-player

Time and Eternity (Note: Known in Japan as Toki to Towa: TokiTowa (Japanese: 時と永遠〜トキトワ〜)) is a role-playing video game developed by Imageepoch for the PlayStation 3. It was published in Japan by Bandai Namco Games in 2012, and worldwide by NIS America in 2013. The story follows the knight Zack and princess Toki, who are attacked during their wedding ceremony. Zack is killed, awakening a soul sharing Toki's body called Towa, and the three repeatedly travel back through time to thwart those responsible for the attack. The game follows Toki and Towa, who share the same body, exploring different environments and engaging in real-time action-based combat with enemies.

The game's concept was created by Imageepoch CEO Ryoei Mikage, who wanted to make a game that portrayed its characters solely through traditional animation. He brought it to Bandai Namco producer Kei Hirono, who liked it and got the project started. Development lasted three years, and multiple staff members cited varied difficulties with its production. The staff included Bakemonogatari artist Vofan designing the characters, Yuzo Koshiro as co-composer, and Satelight creating the animation. Time and Eternity underperformed in sales, and met with a negative reaction from journalists. While its premise and aspects of its art and music were praised, most otherwise disliked the gameplay, story and characters.

== Gameplay ==
A battle in Time and Eternity, showing main character Toki in a standard enemy encounter.

Time and Eternity is a role-playing video game in which players take on the role of Toki and Towa, the alternate personalities of a princess betrothed to the story's main protagonist, named Zack by default; during the story, Zack accompanies them as a spirit possessing their small dragon pet Drake. The game progresses by completing quests across its four chapters, which are tied to exploring locations selected from an overworld map. The player can also pick up side quests which reward in-game currency. During exploration and combat, all characters and enemies are displayed with animated 2D art, while the environments use 3D graphics.

During dungeon navigation, shown through a camera fixed behind Toki and Towa, the player explores environments to find treasure in chests and trigger story events tied to quests. Combat is triggered through random encounters, with all fights seeing Toki or Towa fighting a single enemy using a real-time battle system: some encounters have successive enemy battles back to back. Toki and Towa have access to three attack types: a gun for long-range, daggers for short range, and magic which can work at any range, with equipment shared between the two. Toki and Towa can attack, guard, dodge, and use up to three assigned abilities. During combat Drake, who cannot be controlled by the player, can perform both attack and healing spells. Performing regular attacks fills an SP meter which is used to power magic, which takes time to cast and can be interrupted by enemy attacks. Toki and Towa can also activate a limited use time manipulation skill, allowing them to slow down, reverse and stop time to allow for increased damage while putting the enemy at a disadvantage. During fights against larger enemies, the game switches to a third-person shooter style, with the player needing to aim and fire spells while dodging the enemy's projectiles.

Toki and Towa increase their power by gaining levels from experience points, equipping gear, and skill points dubbed "GP" which are acquired upon leveling up and completing quests. Upon leveling up, Toki or Towa switch places with each other; this character switch can also be done with a rare consumable item. Toki and Towa's skill trees are separate from each other, with skills only becoming available when a character's level requirement is reached. Dedicated events related to either Toki or Towa can be triggered based on interactions with Zack either during conversations or in combat, which impact their relationship and can alter each the stats of each woman. The game features two standard endings tied to Toki and Towa, and a third New Game Plus-exclusive ending. The affection meter has no impact on the ending choice. When starting a players are able carry over unlocked skills and their current money into the next playthrough. Time and Eternity features two difficulty levels, "Easy" and "Normal", which can be changed at any point.

== Synopsis ==
In the kingdom of Kamza, the earnest but dirty-minded knight Zack is engaged to be married to Toki, princess of the ruling family who holds the power to manipulate time. On their wedding day, the ceremony is attacked by ninjas and Zack is mortally wounded. This causes Towa, a second soul living within Toki, to manifest and defeat the ninjas. Remembering a prophecy given to them by the fortune teller Makimona, Toki and Towa use their power to travel back six months and prevent the attack, inhabiting their younger self; Zack's soul is also transported back by his wish to be with Toki, ending up housed in her pet dragon Drake. They learn that Toki's decision to travel back in time caused a chain of events which led to the Assassin's Guild leader blaming Toki for a presumed attempt on his life. With the misunderstanding resolved, the three travel forward to the wedding day.

The wedding is attacked repeatedly, with each attack prompting Toki to turn back time to try correcting events. In the second loop they save one of Toki's friends from a pact with a malicious dragon that would force her to kill Toki, breaking it with advice from Makimona. In the third loop, Makimona herself attacks upon becoming possessed after stealing a magical artifact to improve her romantic chances. In each loop, it is ultimately revealed that Toki and Towa are to blame in some way, repeatedly creating a temporal paradox. During their adventures Zack comes to care for both Toki and Towa, vowing to love both of them, and becomes acquainted with a sentient talking charm Toki and Towa found inside an hourglass and kept for luck.

After Makimona is cleansed, Toki's grandmother Eva reveals that the source of events comes from when Toki and Towa were children, and were rehearsing a marriage vow for when Toki would get married. Another force interpreted this as a true vow and has manipulated events to prevent Zack from coming between them. After they travel back to the wedding one final time, the charm attacks and is manifested in human form, revealing himself as Moebius, a representation of time. His existence is the reason Toki and Towa can share the same body, and if Moebius is defeated, one of them must disappear. Determined to preserve the vow by erasing Toki and Towa's memories, Moebius travels back through time, forcing the three to fight him as he possesses their previous enemies.

Travelling to the day Toki and Zack first met, the three face Moebius empowered after taking most of Toki and Towa's memories. As Toki and Towa cannot annul the vow themselves, Eva sacrifices herself to travel back in time to prevent the vow being sworn. Without the vow, Toki and Towa are able to defeat Moebius while losing their memories of Zack. Zack must then choose which soul will remain in Toki's body. In the standard endings Zack must choose either Toki or Towa, while a New Game Plus run unlocks an option where Zack's love for both allows Toki and Towa to continue sharing a body. In all endings, Zack proposes once again to rekindle their relationship.

== Development ==
The concept for Time and Eternity was created by Imageepoch CEO Ryoei Mikage, who had long wanted to create an RPG which incorporated traditional animation into its real-time graphics, summing it up as an experimental title. While earlier consoles lacked the power to realise this vision, he felt the PlayStation 3 was capable and approached Bandai Namco Games, who had experience with anime-based projects. Producer Kei Hirono liked the concept, and the project was greenlit. Mikage suggested bringing notable staff onto the project, which Hirono agreed to so the game could stand out within the RPG market. Notable staff included composer Yuzo Koshiro, and Taiwanese artist Vofan. The story draft was created by Shoji Masuda, known for his work on Ore no Shikabane o Koete Yuke, while the script was written by Yoichi Kato. Hirono acted as co-producer with Kensuke Tsukanaka, while future Final Fantasy XV designer Tsukasa Toya was director. Satoshi Maruyama was art director. Paon Corporation assisted the game's production with programming and field design, while the animation was created by anime studio Satelight, known for their work on Macross Frontier and Genesis of Aquarion.

Production on the game lasted three years, with a prolonged prototyping period. Due to its unusual design, there were issues during its development. Mikage described the early development as "groping in the dark", with its production taking much longer than other RPGs at the time. He called it a challenging project, enjoying the experience due to its learning curve while highlighting unspecified areas of development that created issues, while Hirono felt that using traditional 3D graphics would have caused fewer issues. Hirono also noted that while he had an established relationship with Satelight, it was his first time working with Imageepoch and handling both studios at once was difficult. Commenting after the game's announcement in 2012, Masuda recalled that production had been suspended after his work was completed, assuming the game had been cancelled. In 2023, Koshiro said that while initial enthusiasm for the project was strong, halfway into development problems emerged with unspecified development areas. Communication between the team and its leads faltered, and production stalled for a time. While enthusiastic during the early stages, by the end of its development, Mikage was miserable from stress.

=== Design ===
In contrast to other RPGs which had grand themes and settings, Hirono wanted Time and Eternity to focus on the subject of marriage, with him coincidentally getting married during the game's production. It was also supposed to be a light-hearted comedic adventure with "plenty of girl talk". It was primarily developed for a male Japanese audience with appealing female characters and erotic elements. Mikage cited Romeo and Juliet as an inspiration for the desired tonal balance. In contrast to similar RPGs which had empowered male leads with a cute girlfriend, Hirono focused on the empowered dual characters of Toki and Towa while reducing Zack to a supporting role. A key moment planned early on was the final choice at the end as to whether Toki or Towa would survive, while also losing the memories of their relationship with Zack. Hirono wanted this to be an impactful choice for players who had grown to know both heroines over the game. While the overarching premise and tonal balance remained the same during development, the script was rewritten multiple times.

Mikage and Hirono considered multiple studios that could handle the animation before they began full production. Hirono chose Satelight due to his previous working relationship and their experience with HD animation. By the end of production, Satelight had produced around 20,000 animation frames for the project. Blending the 2D and 3D elements was one of the problems during production, with the team creating special shaders to help blend the two elements, and Hirono described the task of properly displaying animations based on the situation as "computationally intensive". While the original plan was for the entire game to use 2D graphics, but later the dungeons and then the field environments shifted into using 3D graphics. Reflecting on how the use of traditional animation impacted production, Hirono noted that it forced the team to build the game around the animation rather than the other way round, as they could not adjust the animations like they could with 3D polygonal models. Hirono remembered getting angry at Satelight staff when it delivered animation work that was unusable due to clashing with the rest of the game. Creating the game with traditional animations was estimated to be three to four times harder than it would have been with polygonal graphics, and several planned parts of the game had to be cut to accommodate the animation limitations.

Vofan was contacted about designing the characters as Mikage was a fan of their work on Bakemonogatari, describing Vofan as his only choice. Hirono clarified that five or six other illustrators were approached before Vofan was brought on board. After an initial remote contact, Hirono flew in person to Taiwan to convince Vofan to work on the game, and despite communication issues due to the language barrier and a busy schedule, Vofan was enthusiastic about the project. After creating a draft design for Toki, Vofan was officially hired half a year later. His artwork became a guideline for the rest of the game's visual design. Hirono noted that during the prototyping stage, Vofan's work translated well into the in-game animations. The monsters were designed in-house by Imageepoch staff, then given to Satelight to animate.

Hirono explained the presence of only one playable character in combat as both a reference to early RPGs that would only have one playable character in a party, and a concession to the amount of time and memory resources it would have taken to create multiple animated characters. He also wanted players to become fully invested in Toki and Towa's journey, making players use both in combat. Faced with these limitations, the team opted for an action-based combat system as they felt a turn-based style would be too static with the animation style. The concept of time manipulation in battle was present from an early stage, but Mikage felt that the new action-based melee system allowed those mechanics to be better implemented. The final combat system was described as a casual-friendly "static fighting action" system.

=== Audio ===
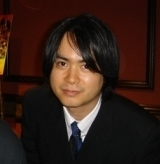
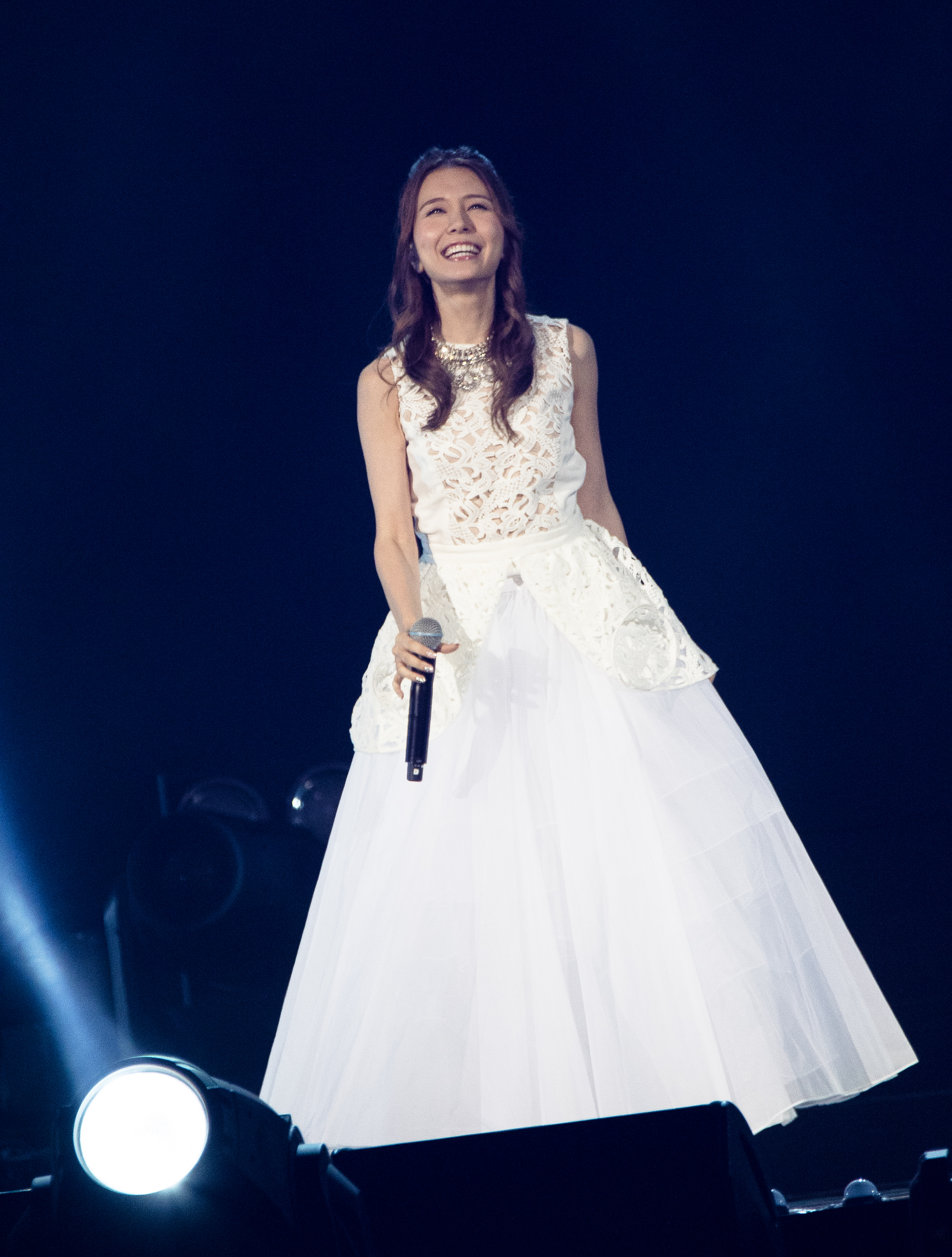
Composer Yuzo Koshiro worked on the soundtrack, while May J. performed its main theme "Rewind".

Koshiro was brought onto the project during its initial stages; the composer had previously worked on the Ys, Etrian Odyssey and 7th Dragon series. When approached to work on the soundtrack, Koshiro was first shown the game's design document and was drawn to the project by Vofan's character designs. He drew inspiration for his tracks form the game's background art. In his comments on the game's troubled production, Koshiro said that he initially shared the team's enthusiasm. After internal communications broke down, he was unable to do anything but "focus on creating the soundtrack". Takeshi Yanagawa, who had worked as an arranger on the 7th Dragon series, served as co-composer.

The game's ending theme, "Rewind", was performed by Japanese singer May J.. After an initial meeting with the production team where she was introduced to the game's world and themes, May J wrote the lyrics around the themes of falling in love and wanting to return to happy times. The song's music was co-composed by Emyli and Na.Zu.Na of Obelisk. While not directly involved in composition, May J provided feedback so the song could be close to her impression of the game. The initial version was a rock track, but at her request it was rewritten to blend rock and electronic genres. While generally intended to be a lively dance-like track, the later sections were made sombre to match her intended themes. May J first performed the song at a stage presentation for the game in September 2012.

A soundtrack album for the game, featuring 29 tracks across two CDs, was released on April 26, 2013 by Sweep Records. The CD featured a dedicated cover created by Vofan, and a booklet with comments from Koshiro, Hirono and Mikage. The booklet featured a misprint, miscrediting one of Yanagawa's tracks to Koshiro. Selected tracks were included on a CD that came with limited editions of the game. "Rewind" was released as a single for CD and DVD on October 10, releasing alongside the commercial song "Summer Breaker". The single came in both standard editions, and a special release themed after the game. According to Oricon, the single reached 30th place and stayed in their charts for three weeks. The game-based version of "Rewind" came with an initially-exclusive downloadable scenario.

The Japanese voice cast featured a number of notable actors including Tsubasa Yonaga (Zack), Kana Hanazawa (Toki), and Eri Kitamura (Towa). Yonaga had played a different character in an earlier Imageepoch game who died soon after his introduction. As an apology, Yonaga was promised the lead in their next project, and was surprised it was another character who died quickly. Hanazawa commented that Zack's portrayal in-game made him come off as perverted, and Yonaga remembered the voice director nicknaming him "Perverted Gentlemen" during recording sessions. Recalling her performance as Makimona, Aya Endō remembered liking the character and consulting the voice staff about how far she could push Makimona's unusual way of talking.

== Release ==
Time and Eternity was first announced in Japanese magazine Famitsu in January 2012. At the time, it was said to be 45% complete. According to Masuda, the game was untitled in early development. He suggested its title based a book of the same name by Seiichi Hatano, and was surprised it remained there in the final release. The title can both be translated as "Time and Eternity", and read as "Toki and Towa"; the title was abbreviated to TokiTowa in Japan. The game was promoted as both the "first HD animation RPG", and as part of Imageepoch's "JRPG Project", a collection of games announced in 2010 intended to revitalise the genre worldwide. Time and Eternity was originally intended to have a CERO "B" rating, aiming for young teenagers. Due to the more suggestive scenes, the game was given a higher "C" rating.

The game was published by Bandai Namco on October 11, 2012. It was intended to release sooner, but it suffered from delays due to development problems. A limited edition was released that contained a soundtrack sample and a booklet of Vofan's artwork for the game. Downloadable content (DLC) was planned from the outset of development, focusing on short comedic scenario additions. The DLC scenarios were released weekly between October 11 and November 8, 2012.

Both Mikage and Hirono confirmed at different times during 2012 that an international release for Time and Eternity was planned. Its North American and European versions were announced in February 2013 by NIS America, who had become Imageepoch's localization partner in 2010. NIS America was introduced to the project by Imageepoch, and Hirono was ultimately satisfied with them as he foresaw that the localization of the game would be challenging. Hirono stated that there were no differences between the English and Japanese versions, with the international release coming with the Japanese dub. Time and Eternity was released on June 28, 2013 in Europe, July 15 in Australia and New Zealand, and July 16 in North America. In Europe the digital version released on PlayStation Network on July 3. A limited edition released in North America containing a soundtrack CD and an artbook; the CD was also included in first print standard copies. English versions of the DLC were released in two batches on July 23 and August 20.

=== Related media ===
Additional media was planned by Hirono and Mikage to further explore and promote the world of Time and Eternity. A manga based on the initial scenario was created by Kikou Aiba and began serialisation in the June 2012 issue of Jump SQ.19, running until November that year. The completed manga was published by Bandia Namco on January 4, 2013. A CD drama was released as part of the limited edition, with Yonaga commenting that it was "full of spoilers" for the game. Two guidebooks, a fan book and a strategy guide, were released in November 2012. While Hirono voiced his wish to turn Time and Eternity into a series, both Hirono and Mikage later clarified that the game was intended as a one-off with the potential for further expansion depending on demand.

== Reception ==
Reception

Aggregate score
Aggregator	Score
Metacritic	42/100

Review scores
Publication	Score
Destructoid	3.5/10
Electronic Gaming Monthly	5.5/10
Famitsu	8/10, 7/10, 8/10, 9/10
GameSpot	3.5/10
GamesRadar+	2/5
IGN	5.6/10
PlayStation Official Magazine – UK	5/10
Polygon	3/10
RPGamer	1/5
RPGFan	38%
USgamer	3/5

During its first week on sale in Japan, Time and Eternity reached fifth place in sales charts with 32,215 units sold. Siliconera's Ishaan Sahdev noted that both Time and Eternity and Imageepoch's earlier Sol Trigger had met with low sales. By the end of 2012, Time and Eternity had sold 41,886 units in Japan. In a post-release interview, Hirono commented that the game had not met Bandai Namco's sales expectations.

Time and Eternity met with generally negative reviews from journalists according to review aggregator website Metacritic. The website recorded a score of 42 out of 100 based on 40 critic reviews. The game saw notable mixed reactions from Japanese players, with Mikage and Hirono acknowledged in November 2012. Several user reviews at the time cited Time and Eternity as one of the worst Japanese gaming releases of 2012. In a 2015 feature on Imageepoch after its bankruptcy that year, journalists Heidi Kemps and Elliot Gay both noted the game's negative impact on the company's reputation along with other underperforming or poorly-received titles. In 2023, Koshiro expressed his disappointment that the game was not as cutting-edge as it might have been.

Reactions to the story varied, with many faulting its writing and characters. One reviewer for Japanese gaming magazine Famitsu praised the characters and story as charming, while another noted that the main characters and dialogue was "a matter of taste". Pete Davison, writing for USgamer, enjoyed Toki and Towa as subversions of their character archetype, while noting that the story otherwise fell into anime convensions. IGN's Vince Ingenito was pleased with the unusual premise but felt it was undermined by both the writing and the focus on Zack's perspective on events. Mollie L. Patterson, writing for EGMNow, felt the premise was undermined by reliance on anime and JRPG tropes. Similarly Miguel Concepcion of GamesRadar+ stated that Toki's unthinking attachment to the lecherous Zack "makes them equally unlikable", an issue compounded by poor writing. Emma Davies of PlayStation Official Magazine – UK felt the game's humour made up for the premise being weak, while Kyle MacGregor of Destructoid disliked the tonal clash between the opening, the romantic comedy-based plot line, and the poor writing. RPGFan's Derek Heemsbergen found the story predictable, and called every character "a vapid, uninteresting cliché, bereft of personality and prone to obnoxious mannerisms." RPGamer's Sam Marchello found the story poor and the writing cliched and filled with humour he found unenjoyable. Both Kemps, writing for GameSpot, and Alexa Ray Correia of Polygon were negative about the game's story and characters in similar ways, particularly Zack's personality and behaviour towards Toki and Towa.

The gameplay was generally seen as competent, but several faulted its execution. Ingenito was fairly positive about the combat design, finding it to be a redeeming point for the game since he needed to use all available tools to get through combat. Davison, while noting repetition in content and enemies, both enjoyed the core combat and how the player was forced to use both Toki and Towa in combat. Famitsu generally praised the combat system's design, but one reviewer felt the battles took too long while another faulted the similarity of Toki and Towa's playstyles. MacGregor called combat the game's highlight, finding the other elements of gameplay either shallow or tedious. Patterson highlighted pacing issues due to both the combat's design and the speed of in-game animations, and Heemsbergen found the gameplay repetitive and lacking either variety or evolving mechanics. Kemps felt that while the gameplay had solid concepts, its implementation and lack of variety made both combat and exploration tedious. Concepcion found the forced character swapping annoying and the combat overly repetitive due to a lack of depth. Marchello highlighted aspects of combat that could be engaging, but found the slow pacing and repetitive structure made the experience boring. Davies said the combat grew repetitive outside Toki and Towa's dedicated special abilities, and Correia faulted both the lack of depth and erratic behaviour of Drake's AI in combat. The side quests were also frequently highlighted as being uninteresting filler content. (Note: Attributed to multiple references:)

Reactions to the game's art and animation were varied. Both Davies and Marchello positively highlighted the 2D character art, and Davison summed up the 2D art as "attractive, well-animated and [expressing] the cast's vivid personalities beautifully." Patterson, while noting some issues with the blend of artstyles and the slowness in gameplay, praised the game's attempt at playable animated characters and positively compared it to Dragon's Lair. Ingenito praised the artistic direction and animation, but called the blending of the 2D and 3D styles "almost grotesque in its crudeness." Three of the Famitsu reviewers gave praise to the use of animation in the gameplay, but one reviewer noted a lack of variety in the animation types during both combat and navigation. MacGregor praised the hand-drawn character designs, but disliked how they looked in motion, further faulting lack of enemy variety. Kemps called the use of 2D art "interesting on paper", but noted heavy recycling of animation and jittery animation transitions during movement and cutscenes. Concepcion enjoyed the artwork and maps as static art, but faulted the animation as looking low-budget due to its jerky movements and limited enemy designs. Heemsbergen faulted the visual style due to its jittery animations and said the blend of graphical styles caused him headaches. The 3D dungeon environments were frequently described as poor quality by comparison, (Note: Attributed to multiple references:) although Kemps felt they added colour to the game.

The music and voice work divided views, with the music seeing general praise and the dub gathering mixed reactions when mentioned. Davison said the soundtrack was worth listening to outside the game, Ingenito included the music as an area where the game succeeded, Kemps highlighted the soundtrack as the game's one redeeming feature. while Davies found the dub irritating as the game progressed. Heemsbergen enjoyed the combat tracks but disliked the environment and conversation tracks, and described the dub as "universally subpar". MacGregor described the soundtrack as "fitting if somewhat forgettable", and praised the inclusion and quality of both English and Japanese dubs. Marchello faulted both the music's quality and the small number of tracks, and found the English dub very poor.
