= Luminous Arc (video game) =

2007 tactical role-playing game

- Developer: Imageepoch
- Publishers: JP: Marvelous Interactive Inc.; NA/AU: Atlus; EU: Rising Star Games
- Directors: Ryoei Mikage; Masahiro Iwasa; Hikaru Nakano
- Producer: Hideyuki Mizutani
- Artist: Kaito Shibano
- Writers: Maiko Shimura; Atsushi Komine
- Composers: Akari Kaida; Kazumi Mitome; Shota Kageyama; Yasunori Mitsuda
- Series: Luminous Arc
- Platform: Nintendo DS
- Release: JP: February 8, 2007; NA: August 14, 2007; AU: October 18, 2007; EU: October 19, 2007
- Genre: Tactical role-playing
- Modes: Single-player, multiplayer

Luminous Arc (Note: Japanese: ルミナスアーク, Hepburn: Ruminasu Āku) is a tactical role-playing game developed by Imageepoch for the Nintendo DS, and the first in the Luminous Arc series. The game was released on February 8, 2007 in Japan, August 14, 2007 in North America, and October 18, 2007 in Australia by Atlus, and in Europe the following day by Rising Star Games.

The game features voiced scenes, character designs by Kaito Shibano and music by Akari Kaida, Yasunori Mitsuda, and Mitsuda's studio, Procyon. Along with the main gameplay, there is an online multiplayer battle option.

The game has a sequel, Luminous Arc 2, that was released in 2008. Luminous Arc 3: Eyes was released on December 10, 2009 in Japan. The latest entry in the series, Luminous Arc Infinity, was released for the PlayStation Vita in Japan on August 6, 2015.

== Gameplay ==
Luminous Arc is a tactical role-playing game and uses a battlefield grid viewed from an isometric perspective. The top screen is used to display unit information while movement and attacks are determined on the lower screen. Left- and right-handed touch-screen controls and D-pad control schemes are available. One of the special traits is the Flash Drive Gauge, which, when filled, allows a character to use a special attack. Between battles, players can view short sequences featuring the game's mascot, Kopin, and intermission sequences that will allow the player to get to know the characters in the party better. The game also includes a multiplayer battle mode.

=== Special attacks ===
Each time a player character makes an action, his or her Flash Meter will increase. The player can then use Flash Points to perform powerful attacks, called Flash Drives that may also cause status ailments to enemies. Some enemies in Luminous Arc can also use Flash Drives.

While normal attack skills can damage allies and healing skills can restore enemy HP, the effects of Flash Drives committed to their intended targets; for instance, it is impossible for a recovery Flash Drives to heal opponents. Flash Drives can be learned via leveling up, but several are learned as the story progresses.

Synergy attacks are a combination attack that can be used when all characters involved have their Flash Points filled up and are close to each other. However, not all characters can perform Synergy attacks, as they are unlocked via story arcs that revolve around certain characters bonding.

=== Intermissions ===
After each battle, the spoils of battle will be displayed on the screen, including gold, items, and Vitae. In addition, the player will be prompted to talk with one of the characters that took part in the battle. An Intermission scene occurs after the ensuing plot dialogue, in which the player can have a short conversation with the previously selected character. On the touch screen, a list of responses will appear with the chosen character's avatar on the top screen. If the choice was favorable, the main character, Alph, will develop a stronger bond with that character, which takes the form of evasion and hit rate bonuses if the two are placed next to each other in future battles. If the character particularly likes the player's response, he or she may give Alph a useful item. However, the player is given a finite number of opportunities to talk to each character, after which it will be impossible to improve the bond. If the player has made good choices throughout the various conversations with a character, there may be a special scene between Alph and that character featuring anime-style art and an additional voice-over. If you say the right thing, you could get an item from the person. As the bond between a character and Alph improve, the heart will continue to grow, and once the heart becomes blue, the character will no longer speak with Alph during Intermission.

There are also short cutscenes after every story battle featuring the game's mascot, Kopin. Though he claims that he will try to keep an eye on the characters and tell the story from his point of view, the player actually learns more about Kopin's personality, philosophy, and possible love interests.

=== Vitae ===
Throughout the adventure, the player will obtain magical items called Vitae. According to the game's lore, Vitae obtain their magical properties from the ancient power of Rune, the same power used by the Witches to fuel their magic. In order to make use of a piece of Vitae, it must first be appraised at the workshop in the Witch Village. Once this has been accomplished, the Vitae can be used to add elemental and status effects to weapons. In addition, it is possible to ask other characters about what they know about Vitae. This will allow the player to learn the best combinations for developing items with different strengths.

=== Multiplayer battles ===
Using the Wi-Fi option, players can choose to either battle against an anonymous and random opponent, or against a player whose friend code has been registered. Items are won for each game played against a random opponent, with more being earned if the player is victorious. Players can also play locally via the DS' wireless connection.

== Plot ==
Luminous Arc takes place in the world of Shtraberl. The land is in a medieval-like era, where the Luminous Church rules over the lands. The Luminous Church which worships their God Zehaal is the only form of government the land has.

According to the scriptures known as The Book of Mena of the Luminous Church, thousands of years ago Witches and Dragons fought all across the world to be the superior race. In the process: The air was stale, the earth barren. The seas raged and the sun vanished. The world fell into darkness. This disaster was known as Aldheld.

The scriptures go on to continue that the saints prayed upon the barren land and eventually the God Zehaal replied to their prayers in beginning the Advent. Zehaal then defeated both the Dragons and Witches and cleansed the world.

It was then that Zehaal supposedly blessed the world and named it Shtraberl. Afterwards he endowed the saints with knowledge and went into a deep slumber. The saints then went on to create the Luminous Church.

The actual game begins with the Garden Children, a group of people raised as an elite force for the Luminous Church. In the beginning of the game the Garden Children are called to a town to be given their first orders by the Church. They are ordered to hunt for Witches which have been spotted in Canal.

As the game progresses, the Garden Children discover that the Witches are not as evil as they had been taught. They then, through the witches discover that the God of the Luminous Church, Zehaal, is trying to resurrect himself to consume the world.

After joining forces, the garden Children and the witches fight past members of the Luminous Church as well as vassals of Zehaal. They spend the game fighting against the Luminous Church and their sinister attempts to defeat them. Near the end of the game the group goes through a portal to the world's center to confront Zehaal.

They then battle Zehaal and his true form, The Wings Of Doom. After injuring the Wings Of Doom he retreats to lick his wounds, and Lucia the Dawn witch decides to use a powerful yet self-destructive magic to finish him forever. Alph then stays with her to ensure she does not die in the attack, and together they defeat Zehaal once and for all.

In the aftermath of the final battle, Canal is restored to a peaceful state. A stable form of government is formed and the Witches are accepted into society as heroes rather than deviants.

== Development ==
The game was developed by Marvelous Interactive and "rookie development studio" imageepoch. The game's music was produced, mixed, and mastered by famed sound designer and composer Yasunori Mitsuda. He, along with Akari Kaida, Kazumi Mitome, and Shota Kageyama, composed the music for the game.

== Reception ==
Reception

Aggregate score
Aggregator	Score
Metacritic	70/100

Review scores
Publication	Score
Electronic Gaming Monthly	5.83/10
Eurogamer	6/10
Famitsu	28/40
Game Informer	6/10
GameSpot	7.5/10
GameSpy	3/5
GameZone	7.6/10
IGN	7.5/10
Nintendo Life	5/10
Nintendo Power	8/10
RPGamer	3/5
RPGFan	85%

Luminous Arc received "average" reviews according to the review aggregation website Metacritic. Honest Gamers said, "I realised that it was exactly because Luminous Arc refused to take itself seriously that it was so much fun."

However, 1Up.com rated the game as "average", calling it a "Final Fantasy Tactics Advance clone" because of its similar gameplay and overall feel. While not impressed with the DS's touch screen capabilities used in the game, the editor wrote that "the game's biggest attraction, in theory, is wireless multiplayer, either locally or online". GamePro said, "It's a decent enough game but it isn't the grand strategy RPG experience that we've all been waiting for." (Note: GamePro gave the game two 4/5 scores for graphics and sound, and two 3/5 scores for control and fun factor.)

Japanese publication Famitsu gave the game a score of one eight, two sevens, and one six for a total of 28 out of 40. Luminous Arc sold 25,676 units during its debut week in Japan.
