= Luminous Arc =

Tactical role-playing video game series

- Genre(s): Tactical role-playing
- Developer(s): Imageepoch, Felistella
- Publisher(s): Atlus, Marvelous Entertainment
- First release: Luminous Arc; 2007
- Latest release: Luminous Arc Infinity; 2015

Luminous Arc is a series of tactical role-playing video games originally developed by Imageepoch, prior to the company's bankruptcy. The series began with the 2007 release of Luminous Arc for the Nintendo DS, with its most recent game being the 2015 Japan-only release of Luminous Arc Infinity. The series also saw a spiritual successor in the 2015 Nintendo 3DS game Stella Glow.

== Games ==
Release timeline
2007	Luminous Arc
2008	Luminous Arc 2
2009	Luminous Arc 3
2010
2011
2012
2013
2014
2015	Luminous Arc Infinity

=== Luminous Arc ===
Luminous Arc (Note: Japanese: ルミナスアーク, Hepburn: Ruminasu Āku) was developed by Imageepoch for the Nintendo DS, and released on February 8, 2007 in Japan, August 14, 2007 in North America, and October 18, 2007 in Australia by Atlus, and in Europe the following day by Rising Star Games.

The plot follows a group of adventurers, the Garden Children, who initially fight alongside the Luminous Church to rid the world of witches, but later team up with them to fight against a corrupt plot.

=== Luminous Arc 2 ===
Luminous Arc 2 (Note: Known in Japan as Luminous Arc 2: Will (Japanese: ルミナスアーク2 ウィル, Hepburn: Ruminasu Āku Tsū Wiru)) was developed by Imageepoch for the Nintendo DS, and published by Marvelous Entertainment in Japan on May 15, 2008, and by Atlus USA and Rising Star Games in North America and Europe respectively.

The plot follows Roland, a young knight who is accidentally given the power of the Runic Engine, enabling him to use magic, and is sent by the Kingdom of Carnava to fight against the monstrous Beast Fiends and the witches' Magic Association. He later joins up with the witches, including Fatima, the rogue Shadow Frost Witch, to stop the threat of the Fiends from destroying the world.

=== Luminous Arc 3 ===
Luminous Arc 3 (Note: Known in Japan as Luminous Arc 3: Eyes (Japanese: ルミナスアーク3 アイズ, Hepburn: Ruminasu Āku Surī Aizu)) was developed by Imageepoch and published by Marvelous Entertainment. It saw a Japan-only release on December 10, 2009, but a fan translation into English was released on December 24, 2021.

=== Luminous Arc Infinity ===
Luminous Arc Infinity (Note: Japanese: ルミナスアーク インフィニティ, Hepburn: Ruminasu Āku Infiniti) was developed by Felistella for the PlayStation Vita. The game was published by Marvelous Entertainment and released only in Japan on August 6, 2015.

The game was produced by Yoshifumi Hashimoto, also the producer of the Rune Factory series.

== Related games ==
=== Stella Glow ===
A spiritual sequel to the Luminous Arc series, Stella Glow was the last game developed by Imageepoch prior to its bankruptcy. It was released for the Nintendo 3DS in Japan by Sega on June 4, 2015, in North America by Atlus USA on November 17, 2015, and in Europe and Australia by NIS America on March 11, 2016.

The story revolves around Alto, a young hero who joints the Regnant Knights along with his childhood friend Lisette, now a witch, in order to stop the Witch of Destruction, Hilda, by joining forces with the world's other witches, all of whom wield song-based magic powers. He later must ally with Hilda as well to prevent an even greater threat from destroying the world.

== Common elements ==
=== Plot and themes ===
The Luminous Arc games (and their spiritual successor, Stella Glow), typically take place in a medieval fantasy setting and feature a plot based around elemental witches, female magic-wielders of great power who are recruited by the main character in order to save the world from peril. The protagonist is commonly a male knight, albeit one of little renown yet great potential. While the witches are initially seen as malicious or at least dangerous entities, they are usually largely benevolent and merely protecting the world from malice, the true nature of which is revealed later. Fan service featuring the witches is common, such as Luminous Arc 2's "Engage" system, although it also serves to further their character development through socialization.

=== Gameplay ===
The gameplay of the Luminous Arc titles falls along the lines of tactical RPGs such as Final Fantasy Tactics. Battlefields are viewed from an isometric perspective and characters may be moved on a grid. Characters possess powerful special moves that may only be used when a gauge has been filled.
