= Criminal Girls 2: Party Favors =

2015 video game

- Japanese box art
- Developer: Nippon Ichi Software
- Publisher: Nippon Ichi Software
- Platform: PlayStation Vita
- Release: JP: November 26, 2015; EU: September 23, 2016; NA: October 11, 2016
- Genre: Role-playing
- Mode: Single-player

Criminal Girls 2: Party Favors, known in Japan as simply Criminal Girls 2 (クリミナルガールズ2, Kuriminaru Gāruzu 2), is a role-playing video game developed and published by Nippon Ichi Software for PlayStation Vita in 2015-2016. It is the sequel to the 2010 PlayStation Portable video game Criminal Girls.

== Reception ==
Reception

Aggregate score
Aggregator	Score
Metacritic	67/100

Review scores
Publication	Score
4Players	59%
Famitsu	30/40
Hardcore Gamer	3/5
HobbyConsolas	69%
Pocket Gamer	3.5/5
Push Square	7/10
RPGamer	2.5/5
RPGFan	69%

The game received average reviews, a bit more favorable than Invite Only, according to the review aggregation website Metacritic. Pocket Gamer thought that the battle system compensated for the game's "shady veneer". In Japan, Famitsu gave it a score of one seven, two eights, and one seven for a total of 30 out of 40.
