= Criminal Girls: Invite Only =

2010 video game

- Developer: Imageepoch
- Publisher: Nippon Ichi Software
- Platforms: PlayStation Portable, PlayStation Vita, Microsoft Windows
- Release: PSP: JP: November 18, 2010; PlayStation Vita: JP: November 28, 2013; NA: February 3, 2015; EU: February 6, 2015; Windows; January 11, 2017
- Genre: Role-playing
- Mode: Single-player

Criminal Girls: Invite Only (Note: Known in Japan as Criminal Girls: Invitation (クリミナルガールズ INVITATION, Kuriminaru Gāruzu INVITATION)) is a role-playing video game developed by Imageepoch and published by Nippon Ichi Software. It was originally released as Criminal Girls (Note: Kuriminaru Gāruzu (クリミナルガールズ)) on November 18, 2010 for PlayStation Portable, in Japan only. An enhanced port for PlayStation Vita was released in Japan on November 28, 2013, and the rest of the world in February 2015, and for Steam on January 11, 2017. The "unabashedly risqué Japanese game" was controversially censored for its Western release, by "stripping the sound and obscuring the action".

== Plot ==
The main character is sent to hell and tasked with rehabilitating seven girls.

== Gameplay ==
Gameplay involves a lot of dungeon crawling and other RPG elements.

== Reception ==
Reception

Aggregate score
| Aggregator | Score |
|---|---|
| Metacritic | (PC) 65/100 (Vita) 55/100 |

Review scores
| Publication | Score |
|---|---|
| 4Players | 55% |
| Destructoid | 8/10 |
| Famitsu | (Vita) 29/40 (PSP) 28/40 |
| GameSpot | 4/10 |
| GameZone | 8/10 |
| Hardcore Gamer | 2.5/5 |
| Pocket Gamer | 3/5 |
| Push Square | 4/10 |
| RPGamer | 2.5/5 |
| RPGFan | 65% |
| The Digital Fix | 3/10 |
| The Observer | 1/5 |

The PlayStation Vita and PC versions received "mixed" reviews according to the review aggregation website Metacritic. GameSpot thought the combat was let down by the "tedious design" and "perverse activities". In Japan, Famitsu gave it a score of 28 out 40 for the PSP version, and 29 out of 40 for the PlayStation Vita version.

== Legacy ==
A sequel entitled Criminal Girls 2: Party Favors was released in Japan on November 26, 2015, and in the rest of the world in 2016.
