= Sol Trigger =

2012 video game

- Developer: Imageepoch
- Publisher: Imageepoch
- Artist: Shuji Sogabe
- Writer: Kazushige Nojima
- Platform: PlayStation Portable
- Release: JP: October 4, 2012
- Genre: Role-playing
- Mode: Single-player

Sol Trigger (Japanese: ソールトリガー, Hepburn: Sōru Torigā) is a role-playing video game developed by Imageepoch for the PlayStation Portable. It was released in Japan on October 4, 2012.

== Gameplay ==
The game is a turn based RPG. It features gameplay mechanics such as "Sol System", where the players can activate characters' "Sol Power" to activate special moves that become stronger the more they are used. "Sol Power" can also be traded away in order to revive teammates in battle as well, similar to the game Soul Sacrifice. Additional skills can be learned by equipping new weapons.

== Story ==
The game is set in a distant future, based around the fictional city "Kaiserhald". In the game's world, "Sol" has the power to create miracles, but is hoarded by Kaiserhald and its "Machine Church". The "Sol Trigger" is a group of people who oppose their corrupt use of the "Sol", and they fight to stop them.

== Development ==
A Japanese trademark for the name Sol Trigger was first registered in November 2011, and the game was first announced in May 2012, in an issue of Famitsu. It was revealed to be the company's most expensive, high-budget game ever attempted, and their last game for the PlayStation Portable system. Staff include Shuji Sogabe as character designer, who previously worked on the Persona 4 comic, and Kazushige Nojima as the game scenario writer, who previously wrote parts of Final Fantasy VII and Kingdom Hearts. Anime video scenes were created by J.C.Staff.

Originally scheduled to be released on August 30, 2012, it was later delayed to October 4, upon request of retailers, who claimed that there were already too many games releasing on that date in Japan. A demo of the game was released for download on the Japanese PlayStation Store in July 2012.

To promote the game's release, a mini web browser game, Sol Trigger Training School, was released. The game was a one-on-one fighting game, played by clicking a mouse as fast as possible. Password could be received to unlock bonus features in Sol Trigger.

=== Localization ===
While the game was not announced in any other regions, some journalists speculated an English release could happen due to developer Imageepoch's past efforts to work with American publishers, such as Atlus (Luminous Arc and Luminous Arc 2), Aksys Games (Fate/Extra), and NIS America (Black Rock Shooter: The Game). However, sources such as Kotaku feared it may not be released into other regions due to the PlayStation Portable no longer being an active video game platform in North American or European regions by 2012. Siliconera felt there may be hope for localization due to Imageepoch registering the Japanese trademark for the game's title in Japanese and English. As of 2018, the game has not been released in any other region.

== Sales and legacy ==
As of mid-October, the game had sold 52,234 copies in Japan.

Ryoei Mikage, founder and CEO of Imageepoch, said he is interested in the possibility of making a sequel to the game. "Cyril", a character from the game, was made available as a playable character in another Imageepoch game, Chevalier Saga Tactics, when playing a special Sol Trigger themed mission.
