= Imageepoch =

Japanese video game developer

Imageepoch Inc.
- Type: Private
- Industry: Video games
- Founded: June 9, 2005
- Defunct: May 13, 2015
- Fate: Bankruptcy
- Successor: Mikage LLC
- Headquarters: Tokyo, Japan
- Key people: Ryoei Mikage (Founder/Owner); Kazuya Niinou (Senior Director); Hiroyuki Kanemaru (Director)
- Products: Luminous Arc (series); Fate/Extra (series); 7th Dragon (series); Criminal Girls
- Number of employees: Over 120 (as of Jan. 2009)
- Website: http://imageepoch.co.jp/

Imageepoch Inc. (イメージエポック, Imējiepokku) was a video game developer based in Tokyo, Japan.

The company was filed for bankruptcy in 2015, due to its declining sales and increasing debt.

== History ==
The company was founded in June 2005 by Ryoei Mikage. Their first release was the tactical role-playing game on Nintendo DS, Luminous Arc.

In April 2015, Gematsu reported that Idea Factory's Yoshiteru Sato shared that he was unable to reach Mikage privately and confirming that the Imageepoch CEO had gone missing. In the same article, Ryoei Mikage's Twitter account was noted as being inactive publicly for months. The following month, Imageepoch was confirmed to have gone bankrupt.

Imageepoch closed their doors and reopened as Mikage LLC.

== Games ==
=== Nintendo DS ===
- Luminous Arc (2007)
- Luminous Arc 2 (2008)
- Sands of Destruction (2008)
- 7th Dragon (2009)
- Luminous Arc 3 (2009)

=== Wii ===
- Case Closed: The Mirapolis Investigation (2007)
- Arc Rise Fantasia (2009)

=== Nintendo 3DS ===
- SoniPro (2014)
- Toshin Toshi Girls Gift RPG (2014)
- Yoshi's New Island (2014, with Arzest)
- Stella Glow (2015)
- 7th Dragon code VFD (2016)

=== PlayStation Portable ===
- Last Ranker (2010)
- Fate/Extra (2010)
- Criminal Girls (2010)
- Final Promise Story (2011)
- Black Rock Shooter: The Game (2011)
- 7th Dragon 2020 (2011)
- Sol Trigger (2012)
- Fate/Extra CCC (2013)
- 7th Dragon 2020-II (2013)

=== PlayStation 3 ===
- Chevalier Saga Tactics (2011)
- Time and Eternity (2012)

=== PlayStation Vita ===
- Criminal Girls: Invite Only (2013)
