= Stella Glow =

2015 video game

- North American cover art
- Developer: Imageepoch
- Publishers: JP: Sega; NA: Atlus USA; PAL: NIS America
- Director: Dai Oba
- Producer: Hideyuki Mizutani
- Programmer: Taichiro Kuroiwa
- Artists: Ideolo; Masato Shakado; Eriko Fujiwara
- Writers: Dai Oba; Hideyuki Mizutani
- Composers: Shunsuke Tsuchiya; Yasunori Mitsuda
- Platform: Nintendo 3DS
- Release: JP: June 4, 2015; NA: November 17, 2015; AU: March 10, 2016; EU: March 11, 2016
- Genre: Tactical role-playing
- Mode: Single-player

Stella Glow (ステラグロウ, Sutera Gurou) is a 2015 role-playing video game developed by Imageepoch for the Nintendo 3DS. It was released in Japan by Sega, in North America by Atlus USA, and in Europe and Australia by NIS America. Its story centers around a young man who must journey to unite four witches so he can save his home town from destruction. It was the final game by Imageepoch before their bankruptcy.

== Gameplay ==
Gameplay is divided into different areas, free time and battle time. During either, players have the ability to purchase items and fight random monsters, but there are certain things that can only be accomplished via free time and battle time. In free time players are given three opportunities to build relationships with their teammates, perform odd jobs, or explore the surrounding area. They are also given the opportunity to "tune" the witches, a process that becomes necessary when personal strife would prevent the player from increasing their relationship with the respective witch. Doing any of these things will cause time to pass and the extent to which a player develops a relationship can impact the game's ending. Engaging in battle time will progress the game's story. Battles are turn based and the extent of a character's abilities can depend greatly on how close Alto is to the person, as a closer relationship or friendship can allow the character to unlock various abilities.

== Plot ==
A witch, Hilda, has been crystallizing people all over the country. Alto, an amnesiac, must unite the other witches and have them sing the Anthem that will undo Hilda's efforts. Alto can tune and amplify the witches' songs. The witches' powers stem from Qualia crystals.

Alto sets out with the Regnant Knights, led by their captain, Klaus, to search for the remaining witches. Along the way, they are harassed by Hilda and her followers, who attempt to assassinate the witches and claim that they are trying to protect the world in doing so. In some of these battles, Alto and the witches are assisted by Angels, alien beings that are hostile to Hilda. Eventually, Alto unites the witches, they sing the Anthem, and the crystallized people recover, but Angels attack the capital. Klaus reveals he is in league with the Angels, and he is Xeno, a companion of the ancient hero Elcrest.

Hilda surrenders to Alto and reveals that she is one of Elcrest's companions, and Alto is Elcrest, having been hibernating for the past 1000 years. Thousands of years ago, humanity's negative emotions spawned a godlike being, the Mother Qualia. Whenever humanity's numbers grew too large, Mother Qualia would awaken and perform the Eclipse, wiping out the majority of humanity. The witches are her way of observing humanity and they would sing the Anthem to trigger the Eclipse. 1000 years ago, Elcrest tried to destroy Mother Qualia. He stopped the Eclipse, but Mother Qualia corrupted him and he had to be put into hibernation. Hilda stopped her own aging so she could protect the world until Elcrest's return. Mother Qualia forcibly corrupted Xeno into one of her agents, and returned him to Earth as Klaus. Hilda believed the only way to prevent Mother Qualia awakening was to crystallize humans.

Alto resolves to confront Mother Qualia, and the five witches learn the Celestial Hymn, a spell to weaken Mother Qualia. Alto reawakens his memories as Elcrest. The young girl Marie is an Angel, and a piece of the Mother Qualia. Marie's sister Eve, who represents the Mother Qualia, kidnaps Marie with the intent to merge her back into herself. Alto and his companions travel to the Moon and kill Xeno when he attacks them. They weaken Eve with the Celestial Hymn. Marie pleads with Alto to kill her and Eve to permanently destroy Mother Qualia. Depending on whether the player raised their affinity with Klaus to rank 2, the player is left with the choice of killing or sparing Eve.

- If Alto chooses to follow Marie's wishes and kill Eve, Mother Qualia is destroyed, but at the cost of Marie's life. The Eclipse is stopped and the Angels disappear. Alto and his companions return to Earth victorious, though the guilt of being unable to save Marie hangs over them, but Alto is confident that as long as positive emotions exist, Marie will return someday. This is the default ending if the conditions for the true ending are not met.
- If Alto refuses to follow Marie's wishes and spares Eve, he instead attempts to tune her, reasoning that the Mother Qualia is essentially still a Qualia. By doing so, he awakens Cartesia, the personification of humanity's negative emotions. Gathering the positive emotions of all of the people they have helped, Alto and his companions defeat Cartesia. Eve finally begins to feel the positive emotions of humanity and ends the Eclipse, intending to go to Earth with Marie and Alto, but Cartesia refuses to admit defeat and attempts to crash the Moon into Earth. In order to protect humanity, Eve decides to stay behind on the Moon to keep it from falling. Even though she will be forced to stay on the Moon forever, she assures Alto that she will continue to watch over humanity as a benevolent god. Alto and his companions return to Earth as heroes, with Eve's story being told so that humanity will not repeat its mistake.

There is an epilogue that varies depending on the character Alto has the highest affinity with.

== Development ==
Imageepoch trademarked the name Stella Glow in August 2014. The game was designed as a celebration to commemorate a decade of the company's history. The game was initially planned to be self-published by Imageepoch, but publishing rights went to Sega instead. The game's soundtrack was written by Shunsuke Tsuchiya and Yasunori Mitsuda.

== Reception ==
Reception

Aggregate score
Aggregator	Score
Metacritic	79/100

Review scores
Publication	Score
4Players	83%
Destructoid	7/10
Famitsu	32/40
GameRevolution	6/10
Hardcore Gamer	4/5
Jeuxvideo.com	13/20
MeriStation	7.8/10
Nintendo Life	9/10
Nintendo World Report	9/10
RPGamer	3.5/5
RPGFan	75%

Stella Glow received "generally favorable reviews" according to the review aggregation website Metacritic. In Japan, Famitsu gave it a score of all four eights for a total of 32 out of 40.

According to Famitsu, the title sold over 16,875 units in its first week on the Japanese market. It sold approximately 22,294 units during its lifetime in Japan.
