= Littler =

Littler is an English surname commonly believed to derive from Littleover, Derbyshire. Some sources describe it as also originating from Little Over, Cheshire, due to its prominence in Cheshire.

== People with the surname ==
- Diane S. Littler (born 1945), American phycologist
- Emile Littler (1903–1985), English theatrical impresario, producer and author
- Frank Littler (1880–1922), Australian ornithologist and entomologist
- Gene Littler (1930–2019), American golfer
- James Lebuu Littler, Palauan high chief claimant
- John Littler (cricketer) (18th century), English professional cricketer
- John Hunter Littler (1783–1856), British army officer
- Luke Littler (born 2007), English darts player
- Matt Littler (born 1982), English actor
- Oswald Littler (1907–1970), English footballer
- Prince Littler (1901–1973), British television executive
- Stuart Littler (born 1979), English rugby league player
- Susan Littler (1947–1982), English actress

== See also ==
- Littler Mendelson, an American law firm
