= 7th Dragon =

2009 video game

- Developer: Imageepoch
- Publisher: Sega
- Director: Kazuya Niinou
- Producer: Rieko Kodama
- Artists: Mota; Akifumi Yamamoto
- Composer: Yuzo Koshiro
- Platform: Nintendo DS
- Release: JP: March 5, 2009
- Genre: Role-playing
- Mode: Single-player

7th Dragon (セブンスドラゴン, Sebunsu Doragon) is a role-playing video game for Nintendo DS developed by imageepoch and published by Sega in Japan on March 5, 2009. The game has not been published in other territories. However, an English fan translation was completed in 2014.

== Story ==
7th Dragon takes place in the high fantasy world of Eden. 80% of Eden is ruled by various fantasy reptiles, all led by 7 dragons, and their hostility to humans threatens society. The player takes the role of a huntsman who is tasked with eliminating the 7 dragons and saving humanity.

== Gameplay ==
When players start their journey, they can create their own characters from the following classes: Mage, Princess, Rogue, Knight, Samurai, Fighter, or Healer. Outside of battle, the characters will be viewed traveling the overworld from an overhead perspective, while the battles are viewed from a side perspective showing each character as they attack their foes.

== Development ==
The game was produced by Rieko Kodama and the design team consists of composer Yuzo Koshiro, character designer Mota, as well as monster designer Akifumi Yamamoto. At the helm of the project is the director of the first entries in the Trauma Center and Etrian Odyssey series, Kazuya Niinou.

== Reception ==
The Japanese magazine Famitsu scored 7th Dragon 9/8/8/8 for a total of 33 out of 40 points. The game was the second best-selling game the week of its release at 80,000 copies. An additional 22,000 units were sold the following week.

== Sequels ==
A spin-off sequel titled 7th Dragon 2020 was released in Japan on November 23, 2011 for the PlayStation Portable. From this title onward the character designs for the series were created by Japanese manga artist Shirow Miwa. It features polygon graphics and takes place in the near-future in a post-apocalyptic Tokyo in the year 2020, where the dragons have invaded the city. This game features new classes revamped for modern times, with the exception of Samurai. The vocaloid Hatsune Miku appeared as an official collaboration aspect of the game, appearing in the opening theme song sequence as well as the voice provider for optional DIVA Mode remixed songs.

A sequel to 7th Dragon 2020, titled 7th Dragon 2020-II was released on April 18, 2013 in Japan also for the PlayStation Portable. Hatsune Miku appeared again in the game as a non playable character; and the game also features a new Idol class and the return of DIVA Mode option, which makes all background music in the game sung by Hatsune Miku.

A third and final sequel, 7th Dragon III Code: VFD, takes place in the year 2100, 80 years after the previous two games, and follows the story of the Nodens Corporation's attempt to complete the Dragon Chronicle in time to save humanity from the awakening of the titular seventh Divine Dragon, an event that would spell doom for the human race completely. A demo was made available on the Nintendo 3DS eShop, with the full game released on October 15, 2015. The game was released in North America on July 12, 2016. Following the game's launch, Sega announced that it will receive three waves of downloadable content within weeks after launch. The game was announced for release in Europe at the end of the year. On November 27, 2019, a Drama CD was released of Code: VFD, starring the same cast as the video game.
