= Luminous Arc 2 =

2008 video game

- North American box art
- Developer: Imageepoch
- Publishers: JP: Marvelous Entertainment Inc.; NA: Atlus USA; PAL: Rising Star Games
- Director: Shuetsu Kadowaki
- Designer: Kaito Shibano
- Composers: Akari Kaida; Shunsuke Tsuchiya; Yoko Shimomura; Yoshino Aoki
- Series: Luminous Arc
- Platform: Nintendo DS
- Release: JP: May 15, 2008; NA: November 18, 2008; EU: October 9, 2009; AU: April 1, 2010
- Genre: Tactical role-playing
- Modes: Single-player, multiplayer

Luminous Arc 2 (Note: Known in Japan as Luminous Arc 2: Will (Japanese: ルミナスアーク2 ウィル, Hepburn: Ruminasu Āku Tsū Wiru)) is a tactical role-playing game developed by Imageepoch for the Nintendo DS, and published by Marvelous Entertainment in Japan on May 15, 2008, and by Atlus USA and Rising Star Games in North America and the PAL region respectively. It is the second game in the Luminous Arc series.

== Gameplay ==
A screenshot of a battle: the top screen shows units' status and information, while the touch screen displays units' positions and turn order

Luminous Arc 2 is a strategy role-playing game in which characters move across an isometric grid. Each character can be equipped with weapons, armor, items, and magical "Lapis" gemstones. Characters learn special skills by leveling up and are able to use a "Flash Drive" special attack upon attacking or defeating enemies. When a character's hit points reach zero, they are removed from battle, but can be revived.

== Plot ==
In the Kingdom of Carnava, in an age when magic supports everyday life and civilization itself, peace is maintained by the queen's knights and the Rev Magic Association. Sixteen years before the game's story begins, monsters called Beast Fiends start to appear, destroying everything in their way. Mattias, leader of the Magic Association, uses the evil Demon Blade to try to seal the source of the fiends, but is sealed away himself by the elemental witches. At the time of the game setting, new Beast Fiends have been appearing, and the government overextends its forces trying to protect the entire kingdom. Meanwhile, Fatima—a powerful witch of the Association with control of the rare Shadow Frost Magic—goes rogue and starts a conflict with the Association, causing more trouble for the Kingdom.

Trying to solve the crisis, the kingdom starts a clandestine research project whose aim is to produce an easier way to use magic. The story starts when the kingdom has just successfully completed the research project, and devised a tool known as the "Runic Engine". Roland, a knight in training, is accidentally imbued with this new power, and fights the Beast Fiends, Master Mattias and the Shadow Frost Witch. In the course of the game, he discovers that the Rev Magic Association had covered up Mattias' turn to evil. However, he does not realise that Mattias did this to try and save the world, rather than destroy it. He later discovers that Bharva, king of the Fiends, was manipulating events, and joins with Fatima to prevent the Mage Queen Elicia, creator of the Fiends, from overrunning the world with them.

The player has a choice of having a romantic relationship with Fatima or Althea, and end game parts of the story, including the ending, will change depending on the player's pre-battle dialogue choices.

== Development and release ==
The game was featured at the Marvelous Entertainment booth at the Tokyo Game Show 2007. It was released in Japan on May 15, 2008 and North America on November 18, 2008.

As with the previous game, famed sound designer Yasunori Mitsuda and his studio handled all the audio mixing and mastering. However, unlike the last time, Mitsuda did not compose for the game. Instead, composers Yoko Shimomura, Akari Kaida, Yoshino Aoki, and Shunsuke Tsuchiya wrote the soundtrack, while Mitsuda acted as sound producer.

The game includes a bonus music CD insert. Those who preordered the game at selected retailers received an art book named "Luminous Art", which offers content from both Luminous Arc games.

A manga based on the story of Luminous Arc 2 began serialization in 2008.

== Reception ==
Reception

Aggregate score
Aggregator	Score
Metacritic	73/100

Review scores
Publication	Score
1Up.com	B−
Destructoid	8/10
Famitsu	28/40
GameSpot	7/10
GamesRadar+	4/5
GameZone	7.5/10
IGN	8/10
Nintendo Life	8/10
Nintendo Power	7/10
Nintendo World Report	7.5/10
RPGamer	3/5
RPGFan	77%

In Japan, Famitsu gave Luminous Arc 2 all four sevens for a total of 28 out of 40. The game sold 41,000 units in Japan in its first week of release. For the North American release, the game received "mixed or average reviews" according to the review aggregation website Metacritic.
