= Luminous Arc 3 =

2009 video game

- Developer: imageepoch
- Publisher: Marvelous Entertainment
- Director: Shuetsu Kadowaki
- Designer: Kaito Shibano
- Composers: Yasunori Mitsuda; Maki Kirioka; Shunsuke Tsuchiya
- Series: Luminous Arc
- Platform: Nintendo DS
- Release: JP: December 10, 2009
- Genre: Tactical role-playing
- Modes: Single-player, multiplayer

Luminous Arc 3 (ルミナスアーク3 アイズ, Ruminasu Āku Surī Aizu; Luminous Arc 3: Eyes) is a role-playing video game developed by imageepoch and published by Marvelous Entertainment. In Luminous Arc 3, witches have ceased to exist, but their legacy lives on through "Magi". There are two people who are associated with witches. One is Sarah, who wants to become the legendary witch and the Holy Witch Sylvia.

== Gameplay ==
Luminous Arc 3 follows the base gameplay of the previous games of the series with few improvements. Characters move on the battlefield and attack enemies with weapon strikes, skills that consume Magic Points and more powerful attacks dubbed Flash Drives, which require Drive Points to use.

== Plot ==
The Royal Kingdom of Saint Bardia had been in peace for a thousand years. People thank the Holy Knight Anogia and the legendary Holy Witch Sylvia, which saved the world once. A war between humans and the Felicias (a species of fairy) has started. They fight for the power of Eyes that provides magical powers.
