= Yū Kobayashi =

Japanese voice actress and singer (born 1982)

- 小林 ゆう
- Born: February 5, 1982 (age 44); Tokyo, Japan
- Occupations: Voice actress; singer
- Years active: 2003–present
- Agent: Holy Peak
- Notable work: Fire Emblem as Lucina; Bakugan as Dan Kuso; Attack on Titan as Sasha Blouse; Gintama as Ayame Sarutobi; Kiss Him, Not Me as Kae Serinuma; Negima! as Setsuna Sakurazaki; Steins;Gate as Luka Urushibara; Honkai Impact 3rd as Misteln "Hare" Schariac; Dorohedoro as Noi; Beyblade Burst as Wakiya Komurasaki; Black Clover as Charlotte Roselei; One Piece as Black Maria; Higurashi When They Cry as Satoshi Hojo; Umineko When They Cry as Kanon
- Musical career
- Genres: J-pop; Anison
- Instrument: Vocals
- Years active: 2007–present
- Labels: Konami; Media Factory
- Spouse: Undisclosed (m. 2017)

Yū Kobayashi (小林 ゆう, Kobayashi Yū; born February 5, 1982) is a Japanese voice actress and singer affiliated with Holy Peak. Some of her most prominent roles include that of Tadamichi Aoba in Dan Doh!!, Setsuna Sakurazaki in Negima! Magister Negi Magi, Dan Kuso in Bakugan Battle Brawlers, Misaki Hijiri in Saint October, Kaede Kimura in Sayonara, Zetsubou-Sensei, Sasha Braus in Attack on Titan, Lucina in the Japanese version of the Fire Emblem series, Luka Urushibara in Steins;Gate, and Charlotte Roselei in Black Clover, among others.

== Biography ==
Before venturing as a voice actress, Kobayashi worked as a model for magazines. In 2003, she auditioned for the role of Setsuna Sakurazaki in Negima! Magister Negi Magi, beginning her career as a voice actress. In 2007, she made her debut as a singer with the single Sora no Kotoba, which was the second closing theme of the Saint October anime. In 2008, she was nominated for "Best New Actress" at the second edition of the Seiyū Awards. Also in that same year, she released her first album YOU&YU and her first mini-album, ROCK YOU!!. Later, in 2010, she created the musical group Crush Tears.

On August 1, 2012, Rakugo CD "Moouchi!" is released. On December 29, 2017, she announced her marriage on her Twitter account.

== Filmography ==
=== Anime TV series ===
List of voice performances in anime TV series
Year	Title	Role	Notes	Source
2004	Dan Doh!!	Tadamichi Aoba		
2005	School Rumble	Lala Gonzalez	eps. 18, 20–23	
2005	Negima!	Setsuna Sakurazaki	eps. 6, 9–19, 19–26	
2005	Happy Seven	Mahiru Oki		
2006	Hell Girl	Saki Kirino	ep. 14	
2006	School Rumble: 2nd Semester	Lala Gonzalez	also voiced Drive and Mama (ep. 21)	
2006	Gintama (season 1)	Ayame Sarutobi	also voiced Saruko (ep. 122)	
2006	Princess Princess	Sakamoto Natsumi	ep. 6	
2006	Tsuyokiss Cool×Sweet	Nagomi Yashi		
2006	Higurashi When They Cry (Higurashi no Naku Koro Ni)	Satoshi Hōjō	eps. 16–17, 20–21	
2006	Negima!?	Setsuna Sakurazaki		
2007	Saint October	Misaki Hijiri		
2007	Buso Renkin	Chitose Tateyama	also voiced Shuusui Hayasaka (child) (ep. 11)	
2007	Tōka Gettan	Shōko Rokujō		
2007	Bakugan Battle Brawlers (season 1)	Danma Kūsō		
2007	Sayonara, Zetsubou-Sensei	Kaere Kimura		
2007	Baccano!	Nice Holystone		
2008	Kamen no Maid Guy	Miwa Hirano		
2008	Amatsuki	Benitobi	ep. 10	
2008	Sekirei	Akitsu		
2008	Sands of Destruction (Note: Known in Japan as World Destruction: Sekai Bokumetsu no Rokunin.)	Lia Dragonell	ep. 2	
2008	Kyō no Go no Ni	Ryota Sato		
2009	Maria Holic	Mariya Shidō		
2009	Saki	Yumi Kajiki		
2009	Umineko When They Cry (Umineko No Naku Koro Ni)	Kanon		
2009	Sgt. Frog (season 6)	Yamada	ep. 273	
2009	Nyan Koi!	Nagi Ichinose		
2010	Sound of the Sky	Rio Kazumiya		
2010	Ōkami Kakushi	Hiroshi Kuzumi		
2010	Dance in the Vampire Bund	Meiren		
2010	Bakugan Battle Brawlers: New Vestroia	Danma Kūsō		
2010	Maid Sama!	Shizuko Kaga		
2010	B Gata H Kei	Kyōka Kanejō		
2010	Arakawa Under the Bridge	Amazoness	ep. 13	
2010	Occult Academy	Chihiro Kawashima		
2010	Seitokai Yakuindomo	Naruko Yokoshima		
2010	Sekirei: Pure Engagement	Akitsu	eps. 4–6, 11–12	
2010	Arakawa Under the Bridge x Bridge	Amazoness		
2010	Hyakka Ryōran: Samurai Girls	Matabee Gotō		
2010	The World God Only Knows (season 1)	Yū Hatori	ep. 1, 12	
2011	Fractale	Clain		
2011	Level E	Kyōko Mikihisa	eps. 8–9	
2011	Fairy Tail (season 2)	Daphne	eps. 69–72	
2011	Bakugan: Gundalian Invaders	Danma Kūsō		
2011	Maria Holic: Alive	Mariya Shidō		
2011	Steins;Gate	Luka Urushibara		
2011	Sket Dance	Kikuno Asahina	also voiced Teruko (ep. 30)	
2011	Yondemasuyo, Azazel-san	Undine	eps. 3–4, 7–8	
2011	Inazuma Eleven GO (season 1)	Ranmaru Kirino		
2011	Yu-Gi-Oh! Zexal I (season 1)	Cathy	ep. 9	
2011	The World God Only Knows II	Yū Hatori	ep. 12	
2011	Horizon in the Middle of Nowhere (season 1)	Futayo Honda		
2011	Bakugan: Mechtanium Surge	Danma Kūsō		
2012	Fairy Tail (season 4)	Daphne	ep. 114	
2012	Daily Lives of High School Boys	Yanagin		
2012	Ginga e Kickoff!!	Shō Ōta		
2012	Inazuma Eleven GO: Chrono Stone	Ranmaru Kirino		
2012	Horizon in the Middle of Nowhere (season 2)	Futayo Honda		
2012	Say I Love You.	Mei's mother		
2012	Kamisama Kiss	Isohime	eps. 8–9, 13	
2013	Senran Kagura Ninja Flash	Katsuragi		
2013	Attack on Titan (season 1)	Sasha Braus		
2013	Inazuma Eleven GO: Galaxy	Ranmaru Kirino	also voiced Hilary Flail, Rashid Haqim, and Yuuta Matatagi	
2013	Servant × Service	Kaoru Hasebe	eps. 5, 9, 12–13	
2014	Oneechan ga Kita	Mitsuru Hanazono		
2014	Hero Bank	Isshin Uminari		
2014	Dai-Shogun – Great Revolution	Maika Yurihara		
2014	Denkigai no Honya-san	G Men		
2014	Lord Marksman and Vanadis	Elizavetta Fomina	eps. 4, 8–9	
2015	Gourmet Girl Graffiti	Tsuyuko	eps. 5, 7, 11	
2015	Blood Blockade Battlefront	Chain Sumeragi		
2015	Monster Musume	Smith		
2015	Classroom Crisis	Angelina		
2015	My Wife is the Student Council President	Ryoji Wakana	ep. 12	
2015	Case Closed (season 25)	Mamoru Ganno	eps. 792–793	
2015	Chivalry of a Failed Knight	Ayase Ayatsuji		
2015	Attack on Titan: Junior High	Sasha Braus		
2015	A Simple Thinking About Blood Type (season 3)	O-Type-chan		
2016	Descending Stories: Showa Genroku Rakugo Shinju	Konatsu		
2016	A Simple Thinking About Blood Type (season 4)	O-Type-chan		
2016	Witchy PreCure!	Spalda		
2016	Beyblade Burst (season 1)	Wakiya Komurasaki	ep. 1	
2016	High School Fleet	Machiko Noma		
2016	Danganronpa 3: The End of Hope's Peak High School - Despair Arc	Mahiru Koizumi		
2016	Magical Girl Raising Project	Weiss Winterprison	also voiced Shizuku Ashuu (eps. 5, 7–8)	
2016	Tiger Mask W	Miss X		
2016	Nanbaka	Upa		
2016	Kiss Him, Not Me	Kae Serinuma		
2017	Descending Stories: Showa Genroku Rakugo Shinju (season 2)	Konatsu		
2017	Kemono Friends	Tsuchinoko	eps. 4, 6, 12	
2017	Attack on Titan (season 2)	Sasha Braus		
2017	Beyblade Burst Evolution (Note: Known in Japan as Beyblade Burst God.)	Wakiya Komurasaki		
2017	Altair: A Record of Battles	Lelederik		
2017	Black Clover (season 1)	Charlotte Roselei		
2018	Beyblade Burst Turbo (Note: Known in Japan as Beyblade Burst Super Z (Cho Z).)	Count Night, Kanna Akaba		
2018	Steins;Gate 0	Luka Urushibara		
2018	Tokyo Ghoul:re (season 1)	Kanae von Rosewald		
2018	Lord of Vermilion: The Crimson King	Marie Kurokami		
2018	Attack on Titan (season 3) - Part 1	Sasha Braus		
2018	RErideD: Derrida, who leaps through time	Donna		
2019	Mob Psycho 100 (season 2)	The Dragger	ep. 2	
2019	Case Closed (season 28)	Noriko Izumi	eps. 931–932	
2019	A Certain Magical Index III	Silvia	ep. 26	
2019	Attack on Titan (season 3) - Part 2	Sasha Braus		
2019	Fate/Grand Order - Absolute Demonic Front: Babylonia	Enkidu		
2019	Food Wars! Shokugeki no Soma (season 4)	Decora		
2020	Dorohedoro	Noi		
2020	Somali and the Forest Spirit	Kikila	eps. 3–5	
2020	Hypnosis Mic: Division Rap Battle: Rhyme Anima	Otome Tohoten		
2021	Hortensia Saga	Adelheid Olivier		
2021	Ex-Arm	Sōma		
2021	Attack on Titan: The Final Season	Sasha Braus	eps. 6–10	
2021	One Piece	Black Maria		
2021	To Your Eternity	Sandel		
2021	Digimon Ghost Game	Ruri Tsukiyono		
2021	Platinum End	Mirai's Aunt		
2022	Birdie Wing: Golf Girls' Story	Kaede Oikawa		
2022	The Prince of Tennis II: U-17 World Cup	Jonathan Saint Georges		
2023	The Tale of the Outcasts	Astaroth		
2023	Am I Actually the Strongest?	Giselotte Orteus		
2023	Mushoku Tensei: Jobless Reincarnation 2	Suzanne		
2023	Bikkuri-Men	Oasis		
2024	Delicious in Dungeon	Thistle		
2024	The Witch and the Beast	Lowell		
2024	Grandpa and Grandma Turn Young Again	Setsu Takahashi		
2024	VTuber Legend: How I Went Viral After Forgetting to Turn Off My Stream	Sei Utsuki		
2024	Quality Assurance in Another World	Gaydle		
2025	The Daily Life of a Middle-Aged Online Shopper in Another World	Nyamena		
2025	Zatsu Tabi: That's Journey	Yoshimoto		
2025	#Compass 2.0: Combat Providence Analysis System	Gunsō		
2025	Hell Teacher: Jigoku Sensei Nube	Human Body Anatomy		
2025	I Saved Myself with a Potion!: Life in Another World	Cardeno		
2025	A Mangaka's Weirdly Wonderful Workplace	Arisa Nashida		
2025	Fate/strange Fake	Lancer		
2026	Mistress Kanan Is Devilishly Easy	Ryoko Reizen		
2026	Chainsmoker Cat	Penpen Neko		
2026	Magic Repo Man	Elle		

=== Original video animation (OVA) ===
List of voice performances in OVA
Year	Title	Role	Notes	Source
2004	Mobile Suit Gundam SEED MSV ASTRAY	Kazahana Aja	promotional videos for Mobile Suit Gundam SEED Astray manga	
2005	Itsudatte My Santa!	Sharry	ep. 2	
2005	School Rumble: Extra Class	Lala Gonzalez	ep. 2	
2008	School Rumble: 3rd Semester	Lala Gonzalez	ep. 2	
2009	Denpa teki na Kanojo	Miya Satsuki		
2011	Air Gear: Kuro no Hane to Nemuri no Mori -Break on the Sky-	Emiri Adachi	eps. 2–3	
2012	Guilty Crown: Lost Christmas	Present	included in the limited edition release of Guilty Crown: Lost Christmas visual novel	
2012	Is This a Zombie? Of the Dead: Yes, This Suits Me Just Fine	Eucliwood Hellscythe		
2012	One Off	Cynthia B. Rogers	BD/DVD release	
2019	YU-NO: A Girl Who Chants Love at the Bound of this World	Eriko Takeda	ep. 26.5 (included in BD Volume 3)	

=== Original net animation (ONA) ===
List of voice performances in ONA
Year	Title	Role	Notes	Source
2008	Candy Boy	Shizuku Sakurai	eps. 3–7	
2016	Eyedrops	Tetrahydrozoline Hydrochloride		
2020	Beyblade Burst Surge (Note: Known in Japan as Beyblade Burst Sparking or Beyblade Burst Superking.)	Wakiya Komurasaki		
2021	Vlad Love	Nami Unten		
2021	Beyblade Burst Dynamite Battle	Wakiya Komurasaki		
2021	Record of Ragnarok	Hrist		
2022	Vampire in the Garden	Fine		
2022	Lee's Detective Agency	Wai Fuu		
2023	Scott Pilgrim Takes Off	Julie Powers		
2025	Moonrise	Eric Baker		

=== Anime films ===
List of voice performances in anime films
Year	Title	Role	Notes	Source
2006	Dōbutsu no Mori	Yuu		
2012	Inazuma Eleven GO vs. Danbōru Senki W	Ranmaru Kirino		
2013	Steins;Gate: The Movie − Load Region of Déjà Vu	Luka Urushibara		
2013	Gintama: The Movie: The Final Chapter: Be Forever Yorozuya	Ayame Sarutobi		
2014	Doraemon: New Nobita's Great Demon—Peko and the Exploration Party of Five	Peko		
2020	High School Fleet: The Movie	Machiko Noma		
2020	Meow Meow Japanese History the Movie: Ryōma's Topsy-Turvy Time Travel!	Sakamoto Ryōma		
2023	Fate/strange Fake: Whispers of Dawn	Lancer		
2024	Crayon Shin-chan: Ora's Dinosaur Diary	San		

=== Video games ===
List of voice performances in video games
Year	Title	Role	Ref.
2007	Mega Man ZX Advent	Model A	
2007	Ikki Tousen: Shining Dragon	Chousen	
2007	Pokémon Mystery Dungeon: Explorers of Time and Explorers of Darkness	Wigglytuff	
2008	12Riven: The Psi-Climinal of Integral	Yuyu Hoshino	
2008	Arcana Heart 2	Dorothy Albright	
2008	Doki Doki Majo Shinpan 2 Duo	Rekka Nagisa	
2009	Pokémon Mystery Dungeon: Explorers of Sky	Wigglytuff	
2009	Steins;Gate	Luka Urushibara	
2010	Ar Tonelico Qoga	Luphan/Ayatane Kureha Kirinami	
2010	Metal Gear Solid: Peace Walker	Cécile Cosima Caminades	
2010	Fate/EXTRA	Run Ru	
2010	Memories Off: Yubikiri no Kioku	Kasumi Nagumo	
2010	Koumajou Densetsu II: Stranger's Requiem	Ran Yakumo	
2011	Rune Factory: Tides of Destiny (Note: Known in Japan and PAL regions as Rune Factory: Oceans.)	Mikoto	
2011	Arcana Heart 3	Dorothy Albright	
2011	Senran Kagura: Skirting Shadows	Katsuragi	
2011	Final Fantasy Type-0	Clemente Yuzuki Nes Peacemaker	
2012	Street Fighter X Tekken	Nina Williams	
2012	Fire Emblem Awakening	Lucina	
2012	Danganronpa 2: Goodbye Despair (Note: Known in Japan as Super Danganronpa 2: Sayonara Zetsubō Gakuen.)	Mahiru Koizumi	
2012	Guilty Crown: Lost Christmas	Present	
2012	Hyperdimension Neptunia Victory	Rei Ryghts	
2012	Senran Kagura Burst	Katsuragi	
2012	E.X. Troopers	W.I.Z-γ	
2013	Senran Kagura Shinovi Versus	Katsuragi	
2014	Granblue Fantasy	Therese, Setsuka Sakurazaki	
2014	Senran Kagura 2: Deep Crimson	Katsuragi	
2014	Super Smash Bros. for Nintendo 3DS and Wii U (Note: Collectively known as Super Smash Bros. 4.)	Lucina, Prince of Sablé	
2014	Phantom of the Kill	Pinaka, Vajra	
2014	The Crew	Roxanne	
2015	Senran Kagura: Estival Versus	Katsuragi	
2015	Code Name: S.T.E.A.M.	Lucina	
2015	Shinken!!	Ren Juzumaru	
2015	Fire Emblem Fates	Lucina	
2015	7th Dragon III Code: VFD	Nagamimi	
2015	Project X Zone 2	Lucina	
2015	Omega Labyrinth	Marika Hikawa	
2016	World of Final Fantasy	Princess Goblin	
2017	Resident Evil 7: Biohazard	Zoe Baker	
2017	Fire Emblem Heroes	Lucina, Sheena, Marth (young)	
2017	Honkai Impact 3rd	Cecilia Schariac, Misteln Schariac	
2017	Fire Emblem Warriors	Lucina	
2018	God Eater Resonant Ops	Sera Kisaragi	
2018	Fate/Grand Order	Enkidu	
2018	Super Smash Bros. Ultimate	Lucina, Prince of Sablé	
2019	Samurai Shodown	Darli Dagger	
2019	Black Star -Theater Starless-	Qu	
2019	League of Legends	Vi	
2019	Arknights	Waai Fu	
2020	Guardian Tales	The Knight (male)	
2020	War of the Visions: Final Fantasy Brave Exvius	Oldoa	
2021	Blue Archive	Kenzaki Tsurugi	
2021	A Certain Magical Index: Imaginary Fest	Silvia	
2021	Counter: Side	Akiyama Shinon	
2022	Guilty Gear Strive	Testament	
2022	Eve: Ghost Enemies	Aura	
2022	Xenoblade Chronicles 3	Valdi	
2022	The King of Fighters XV	Darli Dagger	
2022	Path to Nowhere	Langley	
2022	Star Ocean: The Divine Force	D.U.M.A.	
2022	Return to Shironagasu Island	Alex Werner	
2025	Rusty Rabbit	Paul	
2026	Honkai: Star Rail	Kuchiba (NPC)	
2026	Nekopara: Sekai Connect	Fig	

=== Dubbing ===
==== Live-action TV series ====
List of performances in live-action TV series
Year	Title	Role	Original performer	Source
2018	FBI	Maggie Bell	Missy Peregrym	
2021	Yellowjackets	Natalie	Juliette Lewis	
2022	DMZ	Alma "Zee" Ortega	Rosario Dawson	
2022	Werewolf by Night	Elsa Bloodstone	Laura Donnelly	
2024	Poker Face	Charlie Cale	Natasha Lyonne	

==== Animated TV series ====
- Arcane (2021), Vi – Originally performed by Hailee Steinfeld

==== Live-action film ====
- Morbius (2022), Martine Bancroft – Originally performed by Adria Arjona
- The Exorcist: Believer (2023), Demon
- Furiosa: A Mad Max Saga (2024), Mary Jo Bassa – Originally performed by Charlee Fraser

==== Animated film ====
- Despicable Me 4 (2024), Patsy Prescott

=== Audio dramas ===
List of performances in audio dramas
Year	Title	Role	Notes	Source
2008	Maria Holic	Mariya Shidō		
2011	Girl Friends	Satoko Sugiyama		
2013	E.X. Troopers	W.I.Z-α, W.I.Z-β, W.I.Z-γ		
2019	7th Dragon III Code: VFD	Nagamimi		

=== Live-action ===
- Anime Supremacy! (2022), Shiori (voice)
- Ultraman Teo (2026), Pucchi (voice)
