= List of Fate/Grand Order – Absolute Demonic Front: Babylonia episodes =

Fate/Grand Order – Absolute Demonic Front: Babylonia is a Japanese anime television series based on the seventh chapter of the game of the same name. It premiered on October 5, 2019, to March 21, 2020. Aniplex of America licensed the series in North America, and is streaming the series on FunimationNow streaming service, with AnimeLab streaming the series in Australia and New Zealand. The series is listed for 21 episodes.Unison Square Garden performed the series' opening theme song "Phantom Joke". Eir Aoi performed the series' first ending theme song "Hoshi ga furu Yume" (星が降るユメ; "Dreams in the Falling Stars") while milet performed the series' second ending theme song "Prover" and the third ending song "Tell me".

== Episode list ==
No.	Title (Note: All English titles are taken from Funimation.)	Original release date
0	"Initium Iter"	August 4, 2019
In the past, Romani "Roman" Archaman joins Chaldea and acts as the primary doctor for Mash Kyrielight, a designer baby who was turned into a Demi-Servant, a Heroic Spirit put inside the physical body of a human. While the experiment is successful, the Heroic Spirit goes berserk and attempts to attack Chaldea before being suppressed by Mash. Afterwards, the Heroic Spirit refuses to assist Chaldea, though that doesn't affect their plans to use Mash as a catalyst to summon more Servants. Roman is concerned about Mash's limited lifespan and befriends her, teaching her about humanity and the outside world, and she comes to wish to see a clear sky. In 2016, Mash meets Ritsuka Fujimaru, beginning their journey to save the world by traveling back in time to resolve numerous Singularities and meeting many people and historical figures in the process. Eventually, Mash and Ritsuka prepare to enter the Seventh Singularity.
1	"Absolute Demonic Front Babylonia"; Transliteration: "Zettai Majuu Sensen Babylonia" (Japanese: 絶対魔獣戦線バビロニア)	October 5, 2019
Ritsuka and Mash Rayshift to the Seventh Singularity, which is the ancient city of Uruk in the year 2600 B.C. However, they end up landing far from Uruk due to the city being protected by a bounded field. They fight off numerous demonic beasts and are briefly assisted by a mysterious and powerful woman before she takes her leave. Enkidu then arrives to assist Ritsuka and Mash and guide them to Uruk. Enkidu reveals he already knows their mission to fix history by recovering the Seventh Holy Grail from the singularity, and explains that Mesopotamia is on the brink of extinction due to the Three Goddess Alliance, who seek to destroy humanity. He then shows them a massive wall humanity has built to protect what is left of human civilization: the Absolute Demonic Front Babylonia. Meanwhile, a pair of cloaked figures take note of Ritsuka's arrival.
2	"Fortress City: Uruk"; Transliteration: "Jōsai Toshi Uruku" (Japanese: 城塞都市ウルク)	October 12, 2019
As Enkidu leads Ritsuka and Mash to Uruk, they encounter the cloaked strangers, who point out that since Gilgamesh had only recently returned from his quest to try and revive Enkidu, this means that Enkidu should already be dead, outing the current Enkidu as an impostor working for the Mage King. His cover blown, Enkidu attempts to attack Ritsuka and Mash but they are spirited away to safety by the mysterious pair. The strangers introduce themselves as Merlin and Ana, both Servants summoned to the Singularity to fight for Uruk and assist Chaldea. It is also revealed that Fou is familiar with and intensely dislikes Merlin. Merlin guides Ritsuka and Mash to Uruk to meet the king, Gilgamesh. In order to test Ritsuka and Mash, Gilgamesh challenges them to a battle.
3	"The King And His People"; Transliteration: "Ō to Min" (Japanese: 王と民)	October 19, 2019
Mash and Ana are forced to battle Gilgamesh, but he is unimpressed. He reveals that he already possesses the Holy Grail, which is why the Three Goddess Alliance has declared war on Uruk. However, he refuses to hand over the Grail to Ritsuka, stating that it is his treasure now. Suddenly, the woman Ritsuka met before barges into the throne room, revealed to be Ishtar, one of the members of the Three Goddess Alliance. Ishtar briefly skirmishes with Gilgamesh, Mash, and Ana, but withdraws after noticing something odd about Ana. Gilgamesh allows Ritsuka and Mash to stay in Uruk, assigning his advisor Siduri to look after them and giving them an opportunity to work to earn his favor. They are then met by the other servants Gilgamesh had summoned: Ushiwakamaru, Benkei, and Leonidas. Ritsuka and Mash are then assigned to perform numerous mundane tasks. They are eventually given a day off, where they help Ana destroy evil spirits lurking beneath the city. Meanwhile, Enkidu assures his mother that she will be the Goddess to destroy Uruk and seize the Grail.
4	"Welcome to the Jungle"; Transliteration: "Mitsurin no Yobigoe" (Japanese: 密林の呼び声)	October 26, 2019
After one month of performing menial tasks, Ritsuka and Mash are assigned by Gilgamesh to investigate the neighboring city of Ur. They travel there with Merlin and Ana, where both Ritsuka and Merlin suspect the Grail in Gilgamesh's possession is not the cause of the Seventh Singularity. They then have a brief and confusing encounter with a woman calling herself "Jaguar Warrior" before she disappears. Upon arriving at Ur, the residents claim they are in no danger and do not require Gilgamesh's protection. Merlin deduces that the people of Ur had made a deal with a god for protection in return for daily sacrifices, observing the absence of men among the population. The residents confirm his theory, pointing out they have no way of opposing a god. Jaguar Warrior then attacks, revealing she hasn't killed the sacrificed men, only put them into forced labor for her own purposes. Mash and Ana attempt to fight back, but are outmatched. Ritsuka is forced to call a retreat back to Uruk, and promises to return to save Ur. The next day, Gilgamesh meets them at their headquarters.
5	"Gilgamesh's Travels"; Transliteration: "Girugamesshu kikō" (Japanese: ギルガメッシュ紀行)	November 2, 2019
Gilgamesh personally assigns Ritsuka and Mash to be his escorts while he travels to an observatory on the coast in order to inspect the water quality of the sea. Along the way, Ritsuka and Mash tell Gilgamesh stories about their adventures in the other Singularities. While Gilgamesh claims their stories don't interest him, he does acknowledge that they have been on a great journey. After reaching the observatory and collecting the water samples, Ritsuka and Mash take a break on the beach while Gilgamesh handles other matters. Mash continues to wonder if she is truly human or not, while Ritsuka reassures her. Suddenly, they are attacked by Enkidu, and are only saved by Gilgamesh's intervention. Despite claiming to be an impostor, Enkidu cannot bring himself to kill Gilgamesh and retreats. As Ritsuka, Mash, and Gilgamesh return to Uruk, Enkidu tries to convince himself that he is merely an impostor of the real Enkidu and that he should have no issue killing Gilgamesh.
6	"Tablet of Destinies"; Transliteration: "Tenmei no Nendo-ban" (Japanese: 天命の粘土板)	November 9, 2019
Gilgamesh orders Ritsuka, Mash, Merlin, and Ana to find the Tablet of Destinies, which is supposed to contain predictions of the future written by Gilgamesh himself. They travel to the city of Kutha where it was last seen, though Kutha is considered a cursed city since the entire population mysteriously died with no known cause shortly after the Three Goddess Alliance was formed. The city is also within Ishtar's territory. On the way to the city, Merlin explains that the Ishtar they have encountered was summoned by priestesses and fused with a regular human girl, causing her to exhibit personality traits of both a god and a human. While exploring the city, Ritsuka accidentally wanders into the underworld, where he is sent back by a mysterious old man named Ziusu-dra. Ritsuka wakes up with the Tablet of Destinies in his possession when Ishtar attacks. While initially outmatched, the group is able to subdue her when the sun sets, which weakens her power. Ritsuka then questions Ishtar, who reveals that the three goddesses are competing with each other to seize the Grail, which would grant them the power to control the Singularity. She also reveals that she was summoned by priestesses of Uruk, while the other two goddesses were summoned by the Grail. Suddenly, an army of undead skeletons attacks. Ritsuka frees Ishtar due to her cooperation, and Ishtar returns the favor by destroying the skeletons, allowing the group to escape.
7	"Diversionary Operation"; Transliteration: "Yōdō Sakusen" (Japanese: 陽動作戦)	November 16, 2019
Ritsuka tells Merlin how he was easily defeated by the Mage King Solomon in the Fourth Singularity, London. Merlin points out that since Solomon is a Grand Caster, Ritsuka will need the power of the Final Grail to defeat him. The group is then summoned to Uruk's northern wall. Leonidas informs them that a fortress city beyond the wall, Niddur, has fallen silent and they must investigate to see if there are any survivors. That night, Ana wonders whether she should tell Ritsuka and Mash her true identity, but Merlin advises against it since she is their trump card against the Goddess of Demonic Beasts. The next day, Ritsuka, Mash, Merlin, Ana, Ushiwakamaru, and Benkei lead a military force to Niddur. There, they find the city has already fallen, and Enkidu reveals the people are being used to create a new generation of more powerful demonic beasts. Enkidu then attempts to kill Ana, realizing that her weapon and eyes are capable of killing immortals, making her a threat to the goddesses. Merlin orders Fou to teleport Ana to safety. Suddenly, Enkidu's mother and the Goddess of Demonic Beasts, Tiamat, awakens and prepares to attack Ritsuka and Mash.
8	"The Mother of Demonic Beasts"; Transliteration: "Majū Bojin" (Japanese: 魔獣母神)	November 23, 2019
Tiamat attacks Ritsuka, Mash, and Merlin with her Mystic Eyes of Petrification, but they are saved by the timely arrival of Ushiwakamaru. Enraged, Tiamat attacks the Northern Wall directly, prompting Leonidas to mobilize. As a Greek hero and a descendant of Zeus, Leonidas recognizes Tiamat the Greek beast Gorgon. Both he and Ushiwakamaru sacrifice themselves to try and defeat Gorgon, but fail since the power of the Holy Grail saves her. Before Gorgon can continue attacking Uruk, Enkidu advises her to wait, since the destruction of Uruk would dissolve the Three Goddess Alliance and they must wait for their second generation of demonic beasts to be born to deal with the other two goddesses. Gorgon agrees and leaves, declaring she will return in 10 days to destroy Uruk. Before retreating himself, Enkidu reveals to Ritsuka that he is actually Kingu, an artificial human designed to replace humanity. In the aftermath, Benkei admits that he is not the actual Benkei, but Kaison Hitachibou, a man who abandoned the real Benkei to his fate due to his cowardice. Ashamed of his cowardice in refusing to help Leonidas and Ushiwakamaru, Hitachibou leaves Uruk to find redemption in fighting the demonic beasts by himself. Despite the loss of most of their Servants, the people of Uruk are inspired to keep fighting thanks to Ritsuka, who resolves to rebuild the broken Northern Wall. Meanwhile, it is revealed Ushiwakamaru has been captured by Gorgon and Kingu, who plan to convert her into a demonic beast.
9	"Good Morning, Goddess of Venus"; Transliteration: "Ohayō, kinboshi no megami" (Japanese: おはよう、金星の女神)	November 30, 2019
Both Gilgamesh and Chaldea hold a meeting to determine how to fight Gorgon. Merlin explains that Gorgon is the final form of Medusa, driven mad from being cursed by Athena, constantly being hunted by humans, and devouring her own sisters for power. They theorize her ability to birth demonic beasts was a power granted by the Holy Grail. Seeing the divisions within the Three Goddess Alliance, Gilgamesh tasks Ritsuka with convincing Ishtar to join forces with them. Ana recovers from her wounds and rejoins the group. They head to Mt. Ebih to meet her and exploit her weakness for gemstones by offering 25% of Babylon's treasury in return for becoming Ritsuka's Servant, to which Ishtar agrees. Roman questions her about her nature as a Pseudo-Servant possessing the body of a human, and Ishtar explains that she and her human host have merged into a single entity with both halves coexisting. That night, Ishtar confides to Ritsuka that she is part of the Three Goddess Alliance because she does not agree with humanity's decision to abandon the Age of the Gods, since she wants humans and gods to coexist peacefully.
10	"Hello, Goddess of the Sun"; Transliteration: "Konnichiwa, taiyō no megami" (Japanese: こんにちは、太陽の女神)	December 7, 2019
The group returns to Uruk, where Gilgamesh plans to use the Axe of Marduk against Gorgon. Since the Axe of Marduk had killed Tiamat, it should be effective against Gorgon, who possesses Tiamat's Authority. However, the Axe's last known position was in the city of Eridu, which is in the territory of the third Goddess, Quetzalcoatl. Suddenly, Quetzalcoatl attacks Uruk and kills exactly one hundred soldiers before taking her leave, explaining that even though her mission is to destroy humanity, she's decided to only kill one hundred humans per day and promises to return tomorrow to kill another hundred. Jaguar Warrior is also revealed to be allied with Quetzalcoatl, and she carries away all of the corpses Quetzalcoatl left behind. Roman comes up with a plan to destroy Quetzalcoatl's temple in Eridu, which should hopefully weaken her enough to be fought conventionally. Ishtar warns Ritsuka that Quetzalcoatl is the "Apex of Good", meaning that only attacks considered "evil" can harm her. On their way to Eridu, they encounter Jaguar Warrior again. Upon finding out Jaguar Warrior is a rogue Servant with no master who is forced to serve Quetzalcoatl to survive, Ritsuka manages to convince her to join his side. Jaguar Warrior then shows them a camp where the soldiers Quetzalcoatl apparently killed are still alive, having been revived by Quetzalcoatl to serve in her own army when the time comes. Concluding that Quetzalcoatl isn't evil, Ritsuka resolves to defeat her in combat to convince her to join him.
11	"Temple of the Sun"; Transliteration: "Taiyō no shinden" (Japanese: 太陽の神殿)	December 14, 2019
Gilgamesh begins to recall his friendship with Enkidu. As Ritsuka and his group reach the Temple of the Sun, Quetzalcoatl is already waiting for them. Since her existence is dependent on humans, she admits she has no desire to destroy humanity, but she still finds fun in battling and challenging humans. Intrigued by Ritsuka's motivations, she offers to surrender if Ritsuka is able to destroy the Sun Stone at the top of the temple. As his Servants battle Quetzalcoatl to keep her occupied, Ritsuka makes his way for the Sun Stone. Observing the battle, Ritsuka realizes that Quetzalcoatl is not looking for a fight, but is actually trying to test his resolve. In order to prove it, he makes a leap of faith from the top of the temple to attack Quetzalcoatl head on. Impressed by Ritsuka's courage, Quetzalcoatl agrees to join him. As preparations for are made to move the Axe of Marduk to Uruk, Ritsuka recalls how Sherlock Holmes warned him that Roman has no recorded past and helped Marisubury Animusphere win the 4th Holy Grail War. Since Roman hid these facts, he cannot be fully trusted. However, Mash still has confidence Roman is on their side. During his night watch, Ritsuka falls asleep and catches sight of a different goddess who resembles Ishtar. The next day, the group returns to Uruk only to be met by a panicked Siduri, who warns them that something has happened to Gilgamesh. Meanwhile, Gilgamesh awakens in the Underworld and realizes that he is dead.
12	"Death of the King"; Transliteration: "Ō no shi" (Japanese: 王の死)	January 4, 2020
Siduri informs the group that Gilgamesh apparently died of overwork, which puzzles the party. She also admits that there has been a recent wave of mysterious deaths all over Uruk, and Quetzalcoatl reveals that the third member of the Three Goddess Alliance, Ereshkigal, must be responsible. This causes confusion among the group, who initially assumed Ishtar was the third member until Merlin realizes that Ishtar and Ereshkigal must have both been summoned by the same ritual that summoned Ishtar. The group decides to confront and defeat Ereshkigal in order to free Gilgamesh's soul. Since gods and Servants are powerless in the Underworld, only Ritsuka and Mash head there, guided by Ishtar. Ishtar admits that she had once attempted to invade the Underworld but failed, resulting in a humiliating defeat. In the Underworld, they find Gilgamesh, who also intends to confront Ereshkigal. As they journey deeper, Gilgamesh explains that Ereshkigal was forced to take charge of the Underworld against her will and has been trapped ever since. Upon reaching the bottom, the group encounters Ereshkigal and prepare to battle her.
13	"Farewell, Goddess of the Underworld"; Transliteration: "Sayonara, Meikai no Megami" (Japanese: さよなら、冥界の女神)	January 11, 2020
Ereshkigal reveals her plans to kill all of humanity before Gorgon does, so that she can take their souls to the Underworld for herself. She then attacks the group, forcing Mash and Gilgamesh to defend Ritsuka. Revealing that as King of Uruk, he still has the power to harm Ereshkigal, Gilgamesh attacks her directly, telling her it is time to be punished for her actions. This only enrages Ereshkigal further, since she feels she's only carrying out the duty she was given. Ritsuka then realizes that Ereshkigal had been possessing Ishtar's body during the night while talking to him in private. He concludes that Ereshkigal's plot to bring all of humanity into the Underworld is based on her desire to protect them. As Ereshkigal readies her ultimate attack, Ritsuka uses a Command Seal on Mash so she can use Lord Camelot to neutralize the attack. Seeing that Rituska completely saw through her plans, Ereshkigal loses the will to fight him, and Ziusu-dra arrives and severs her connection to the Three Goddess Alliance. Ereshkigal agrees to revive Gilgamesh and the people in Uruk and Kutha whose souls she had stolen, as well as help fight Gorgon. When asked why she came to the Underworld despite her rivalry with Ereshkigal, Ishtar admits that she had always wanted to free Ereshkigal from the Underworld, which was why she tried to invade it in the first place. Gilgamesh leaves as his soul returns to its body, though he notes he wasn't able to find Enkidu's corpse in the Underworld where it was supposed to be buried. He concludes that since Enkidu's soul was destroyed by the gods, Kingu is a different soul that has been placed in Enkidu's body.
14	"Decisive Battle"; Transliteration: "Kessen" (Japanese: 決戦)	January 18, 2020
With Gilgamesh revived, the group begins thinking of a way to stop Gorgon. Gilgamesh comes up with the plan to have Quetzalcoatl throw the Axe of Marduk at Gorgon's temple, the Blood Fort, which should breach the temple and weaken Gorgon enough for Ritsuka to battle her. That night, Ritsuka discovers that Ana had been helping the people Uruk while he was in the Underworld, and she has gained a new appreciation for humans that she claimed to hate. As the demonic beasts attack the northern wall, Jaguar Warrior helps hold them off while Quetzalcoatl throws the Axe, destroying the Blood Fort. However, Quetzalcoatl loses half her power due to still being bound to the Three Goddess Alliance. Realizing Gorgon is in danger, Kingu withdraws from the frontlines. Meanwhile, Ritsuka, Mash, Merlin, Ana, and Ishtar enter the Blood Fort and confront Gorgon. Gorgon tells them she simply desires to take revenge on humanity, causing Ritsuka to declare that he will never accept her. Gorgon then sees Ana and becomes terrified at her presence. Ana reveals that she is Medusa, the younger version of Gorgon. Merlin unlocks Ana's powers and she prepares to use her own Mystic Eyes on Gorgon.
15	"The New Humanity"; Transliteration: "Atarashī hito no katachi" (Japanese: 新しいヒトのカタチ)	January 25, 2020
Ana attacks Gorgon, using her special weapon Harpe to nullify Gorgon's immortality. She uses up last of her strength to land a killing blow on Gorgon and bids Ritsuka and Mash farewell before disappearing with Gorgon. However, despite Gorgon's defeat, the Grail does not appear and the Singularity does not collapse. Kingu then arrives and reveals he possesses the Grail. He also reveals he planned for Gorgon's death from the start, since it would awaken the real Tiamat. Merlin suddenly begins to lose his strength and fade away, and tells Ritsuka to warn Gilgamesh Tiamat is an "Evil of Humanity" before disappearing as well. Ritsuka, Mash, and Ishtar return to Uruk to find the city already under attack by Tiamat's minions, abominations that prove to be difficult to kill, even for Servants. The creatures then retreat despite having the upper hand. Gilgamesh tells his people to seek refuge at the Northern Wall, since Uruk is no longer safe. Ritsuka passes Merlin's warning to Gilgamesh and he explains Tiamat is a Beast, a personification of a disaster meant to destroy humanity. Romani mentions the new creatures are similar to Kingu, and dubs them "Lahmu". Upon finding out Siduri was captured by the Lahmu, Ritsuka heads to Eridu to rescue her. They rescue what few Eridu survivors they can, but Ritsuka realizes Siduri has been turned into a Lahmu. Kingu then arrives, furious at the Lahmus' unnecessarily violent nature and attempts to exert his control. However, the Lahmu betray Kingu and attack him instead.
16	"Awakening"; Transliteration: "Mezame" (Japanese: 目覚め)	February 8, 2020
The Lahmu remove the Grail from Kingu's body, declaring him obsolete. Kingu flees while one of the Lahmu goes to deliver the Grail to Tiamat. He is then cornered in the forest and prepares to meet his end when one of the Lahmu turns on the others, destroying them while being mortally wounded itself. The Lahmu, which is Siduri, mistakes Kingu for Enkidu and tells him how everybody in Uruk grieved over his death. As Siduri passes away, Enkidu's old memories are triggered, causing much confusion and despair for Kingu. Ritsuka and his Servants pursue the Grail but are stopped by Ushiwakamaru, who has been corrupted by Tiamat. While they are able to hold off Ushiwakamaru, she fulfills her mission in delaying them long enough for the Grail to reach Tiamat. Gilgamesh warns that with the power of the Grail, Tiamat has begun spreading her black mud across Mesopotamia, which will mutate any living creature into one of her minions on contact. If left unchecked, all of human civilization will be engulfed and destroyed. With no other options available, Ritsuka and his Servants decide to attack Tiamat directly to stop the spread of the black mud.
17	"The Congress Dances"; Transliteration: "Kaigi wa odoru" (Japanese: 会議は踊る)	February 15, 2020
Ritsuka and his Servants attack Tiamat directly, and Isthar is seemingly able to destroy her with her ultimate attack. However, Tiamat then reveals her true, gargantuan form. Realizing they have no way to fight Tiamat, Ritsuka and his servants retreat back to Uruk. Meanwhile, the black mud overflows onto the shore and is only held back by Uruk's defenses. Upon returning to Uruk, Ritsuka is dismayed to find out that the black mud has wiped out all of the surrounding cities, leaving only 500 survivors within Uruk. Furthermore, Roman points out that since Tiamat is the primordial goddess that gave birth to all life on Earth, she has no concept of death and cannot be killed as long as life on Earth still exists. Ritsuka suddenly gets the idea of sending Tiamat to the Underworld. Since there are no living things in the Underworld, Tiamat should be weakened enough to be killed. The group concludes that they need to halt Tiamat's advance towards Uruk for at least one day to give Ereshkigal enough time to set up a gate to the Underworld underneath Uruk. Gilgamesh then asks Ishtar to use the Bull of Heaven, Gugalanna, to battle Tiamat. However, Ishtar admits that she has lost Gugalanna and had been searching for it ever since she was summoned. With no solid plan delay Tiamat, Gilgamesh orders everybody to rest for the night.
18	"Primordial Star, Gazing Towards The Sky"; Transliteration: "Gensho no hoshi, miageru sora" (Japanese: 原初の星、見上げる空)	February 22, 2020
With Ritsuka and Mash still feeling guilty over releasing Tiamat's true form, Gilgamesh reassures them by telling them in his prophecies, he only saw himself as the sole survivor of Uruk. However, since five hundred people are still alive, that fact proves Ritsuka and Mash made a difference and still have the power to save the Singularity. As Ritsuka and his Servants rest for the night, Kingu sneaks into Uruk, though the loss of the Grail means his body is failing. Gilgamesh approaches Kingu and gives him his own Grail, restoring Kingu's power. Kingu is confused since they should be enemies, but Gilgamesh explains that Kingu has inherited Enkidu's body, and he would like to be considered a friend to him. Gilgamesh then takes his leave, telling Kingu he is free to do what he wants. The next day, with only 8 hours remaining until Tiamat reaches Uruk, Gilgamesh and Romani come up with a plan to use Quetzalcoatl's Sun Stone to destroy the black mud around Tiamat, which should interrupt her advance. Ushiwakamaru returns to try and intercept them, but Hitachibou also returns, intending to redeem both himself and Ushiwakamaru. He sacrifices himself to buy enough time for Quetzalcoatl to use her Noble Phantasm, Xiuhcoatl: Piedra Del Sol, which completely destroys Ushiwakamaru and much of the black mud. Tiamat then reveals she has the ability to fly, forcing Quetzalcoatl to sacrifice herself to use another Noble Phantasm, Xiucoatl, stylized as "Ultimo Tope Patada". The attack fails to destroy Tiamat, but manages to damage one of her horns. As Ritsuka prepares for another attack, Gorgon suddenly appears, putting herself in Tiamat's way.
19	"Absolute Demonic Front Mesopotamia: Part 1"; Transliteration: "Zettai Majū Sensen Mesopotamia I" (Japanese: 絶対魔獣戦線メソポタミアI)	March 7, 2020
It is revealed that the Gorgon standing in Tiamat's way is actually Ana, having assumed her future form. Ana tells Ritsuka and Mash to retreat to Uruk before attacking Tiamat, sacrificing herself to destroy Tiamat's damaged horn and preventing her from flying. However, without Quetzalcoatl to burn away the black mud, Tiamat continues her advance on foot. Upon returning to Uruk, Gilgamesh commends them on their efforts to defend the city and finally engages Tiamat personally with his magic. Tiamat attempts to snipe Ritsuka with a long range attack, but Gilgamesh blocks it, suffering a mortal wound as a result. Kingu then arrives and sacrifices himself to create the Chain of Heaven, binding Tiamat in place long enough for Ereshkigal to finish moving the Underworld. Ishtar blasts a hole underneath Tiamat, causing her to fall into the Underworld. While weakened, the black mud she generates begins to corrupt the Underworld, negating its power. The real Merlin then arrives, having traveled directly from Avalon, and neutralizes the black mud with his magic. He then tells Ritsuka that during his travels in the Singularity, he had unknowingly summoned a Grand Servant destined to battle Tiamat. Ziusu-dra then arrives, revealing himself to be the Grand Servant, the First Hassan-i Sabbah.
20	"Absolute Demonic Front Mesopotamia: Part 2"; Transliteration: "Zettai Majū Sensen Mesopotamia II" (Japanese: 絶対魔獣戦線メソポタミアII)	March 14, 2020
Hassan attacks Tiamat, forcibly introducing the concept of death to her and making her vulnerable. However, as Ritsuka and his Servants attack Tiamat, she summons high class Lahmu to defend herself as she climbs her way out of the Underworld. Ritsuka and his Servants are quickly outmatched by the power of the new Lahmu until Gilgamesh arrives in his Servant form. Gilgamesh is able to suppress the Lahmu and force Tiamat back down into the Underworld. In response, Tiamat creates a "Nega-Genesis" field in order to restart the universe. Ereshkigal sacrifices herself by using up all of her power to temporarily suppress Tiamat while Mash and Merlin use their respective Noble Phantasms, Lord Camelot and Garden of Avalon, to open a path for Ritsuka to attack Tiamat's head directly. Following a conversation with Tiamat's subconscious and confirming Tiamat does not want to harm her children despite their abandonment Ritsuka is able to convince Tiamat that humanity does still love her and thanks her as she cancels her Nega-Genesis field, allowing Gilgamesh to completely obliterate her physical form with his ultimate weapon, Enuma Elish. As the Underworld begins to collapse, Merlin uses his magic to send an unconscious Ritsuka and Mash back to the surface.
21	"Grand Order"; Transliteration: "Gurando Ōdā" (Japanese: グランドオーダー)	March 21, 2020
Ritsuka and Mash regain consciousness on the surface near the Northern Wall, where they encounter Quetzalcoatl and Jaguar Warrior. Jaguar Warrior explains that she rescued Quetzalcoatl after her last ditch attack against Tiamat. Quetzalcoatl congratulates Ritsuka on his victory before fading away with Jaguar Warrior, now that their role has been completed. Ritsuka and Mash then travel to the ruins of Uruk, where they find Merlin and Ishtar waiting for them. Ishtar explains that like the surface, the Underworld was heavily damaged, but lies about Ereshkigal's death, saying that she is resting instead. When asked why he left Avalon to help despite it being forbidden, Merlin reveals that since he is able to observe Ritsuka's journey, he became something like a fan and decided to break the rules this one time. Merlin then takes his leave, returning to Avalon. In a flashback, Gilgamesh recalls a conversation with Enkidu, where he revealed to him Uruk's prophesied destruction and reaffirmed their friendship. Ritsuka, Mash, and Ishtar find Gilgamesh waiting in his throne room. Gilgamesh commends both Rituka and Mash for their victory and recounts how his failed journey to resurrect Enkidu finally taught him the meaning of humanity. He then gifts Ritsuka and Mash Uruk's Holy Grail before they return to Chaldea. As the surviving humans begin to rebuild society, Ishtar and Hassan remain in the Singularity to watch over it while Gilgamesh fades away. However, upon returning to Chaldea, Ritsuka and Mash are informed that the final Singularity, the Grand Temple of Time Solomon, has appeared. Romani announces that Chaldea's next objective is to assault the final Singularity.
