= List of School Rumble episodes =

This is a list of episodes of animation based on the School Rumble manga. Note that all of the English translations are official titles with the exception of the second OVA pair

== Series overview ==
Season	Episodes	Originally released		Format
Season	Episodes	First released	Last released	Format
School Rumble	26	October 5, 2004	March 29, 2005	TV
School Rumble: Extra Class	2	December 22, 2005	December 22, 2005	OVA
School Rumble: 2nd Semester	26	April 3, 2006	September 24, 2006	TV
School Rumble: 3rd Semester	2	July 17, 2008	September 17, 2008	OVA

== Episode list ==
=== School Rumble ===
No.	Title	Original release date	English release date
1	"The New School Year! Be Still My Heart! Love Letter Mayhem! Warp Speed on a Bike!"; Transliteration: "Shin Gakki de Dokidoki! Rabu Retā de Jitabata! Jitensha de Dokyūn!" (Japanese: 新学期でドキドキ！ラブレターでジタバタ！自転車でドキューン！)	October 5, 2004	August 28, 2007
At the start of the new school year, Tenma wishes with all her heart to be placed in the same class as Karasuma so she can one day express her love to him. Her wish is granted, but she is devastated to find out that Karasuma is about to move abroad. Later, Tenma tries to break the ice with Karasuma while studying in the library, without much success. By the end of the day, for all her good intentions, Tenma is no closer to Karasuma than before. Looking for a way to strengthen their relationship, she hits on the idea of cycling to school together. Unknown to Tenma, her admirer, Harima, has had the same idea. Thanks to Karasuma's abnormal cycling speed, both Tenma and Harima are completely exhausted by the time they reach school the following day.
2	"Tough Test! Trapped in the Bathroom! The School Physical!"; Transliteration: "Wakaranai Tesuto! Derarenai Toire! Arienai Shintai Kensa!" (Japanese: わからないテスト！でられないトイレ！ありえない身体検査！)	October 12, 2004	August 28, 2007
When Tenma inadvertently breaks exam protocol during an important test, Harima decides to win her affection with a heroic gesture; handing in his own test in the place of her disqualified one. Unfortunately, he scores zero marks, and the gesture is completely lost on Tenma. During breaktime, Tenma goes to use the toilets, but is startled to see Karasuma outside. Not wanting him to see her doing something supposedly indelicate, she decides to wait until he leaves before coming out into the corridor. The following day is the occasion of a school-wide health checkup. While most of the girls are dreading having their weight measured by a stranger, Tenma is fascinated by the idea of learning yet more trivia about Karasuma-- his height, weight, shoe size and so on. She plans to pose as one of the assistant nurses to get access to the measurements. However, when she is assigned to a "doctor", she finds him to be none other than Harima, who has clearly had the same idea. The checkup is cancelled indefinitely.
3	"See and Sketch! Letter on an Arrow! Pajama Party Confessions!"; Transliteration: "Mitsumete Sukecchi! Neratte Yabumi! Oshiete Pajama Pātī!" (Japanese: 見つめてスケッチ！ねらって矢文！教えてパジャマパーティー！)	October 19, 2004	August 28, 2007
As an art assignment, 2C have to draw pictures of one another. Still seeking a way to express her feelings to Karasuma, Tenma takes an idea from her favorite television series, The Three Who Were Slashed. She writes a letter and attaches it to an arrow, which will then be fired to land near Karasuma, so he can read her message without Tenma having to go through the embarrassment of presenting it to him. Unfortunately, Tenma is a lousy shot and Karasuma has an almost supernatural ability to step out of the way. Tenma has a sleepover with her friends Akira, Eri and Mikoto. Together they talk about love and the successful ways someone might express their feelings. Many of these have metaphorical names and descriptions. Harima has also heard these tips; however, he is not intelligent enough to understand the metaphorical language, and takes everything literally.
4	"Pigs Go Oink! Cats Go Meow! Frogs and Water Imps Go Ribbit!"; Transliteration: "Buta wa Bū-bū! Neko wa Nyā! Kaeru mo Kappa mo Gā-gā-gā!" (Japanese: ブタはブーブー！ネコはニャー！カエルもカッパもガーガーガー！)	October 26, 2004	August 28, 2007
Tenma is desperate to sit next to Karasuma on the coach when a school trip is announced. She tries to make the occupant of her desired seat feel motion sickness and get up, but ends up feeling ill herself. Meanwhile, Harima is hoping to sit next to Tenma, and when the coach stops for a few minutes, he tries to get back on before the others in order to grab the right seat. Yakumo leaves the house early the following day, carrying an extra lunchbox. On a rainy day, Tenma wonders about how Karasuma will get home from school, and wants to share an umbrella with him. He refuses politely, saying he already has a "kappa" outfit. She assumes he is referring to a particular brand of raincoat, but is taken by surprise when it turns out he is actually wearing a kappa costume from some play or other. Holding a large fake leaf over his head, he disappears into the rain.
5	"Burning Hot First Love! Burning Hot Tea Party! Burning Hot Softball!"; Transliteration: "Moeru Hatsu Koi! Moeru Ochakai! Moeru Sofutobōru!" (Japanese: 燃える初恋！燃えるお茶会！燃えるソフトボール！)	November 2, 2004	August 28, 2007
Harima recounts the story of how he met Tenma to his cousin, Itoko Osakabe. Hanai attempts to join the Tea Club in order to get closer to Yakumo, but Akira gives him a hard time. Tenma's homeroom class plays softball to reinforce the friendship shared among students.
6	"Survival After School! Arrival When Confessing! Hospital for Two!"; Transliteration: "Hōkago no Sabaibaru! Kokuhaku no Toki wa Araibaru! Futarikiri no Hosupitaru!" (Japanese: 放課後のサバイバル！告白の時アライバル！二人きりのホスピタル！)	November 9, 2004	October 2, 2007
When Tenma is accidentally locked in a storage room after school, she decides to look upon it as practice for survival in the wild. Later, Harima tries to figure out who is the boy Tenma is in love with (after remembering her say there is another person she likes), and concludes her affection is directed to him. He rides to meet her on a motorcycle, but has an accident on the way after unintentionally crossing a red light. Taken to hospital with minor injuries, he is visited by Tenma bringing flowers. Harima is flustered, and resorts to asking his cousin Itoko for advice. Itoko obliges with her usual mischievous malice.
7	"Pool Cleaning! Pool Racing! Pool Warring!"; Transliteration: "Pūru de Seisō! Pūru de Bōsō! Pūru de Sensō!" (Japanese: プールで清掃！プールで暴走！プールで戦争！)	November 16, 2004	October 2, 2007
When it looks as if Yakumo will be forced to clean the school swimming pool, Hanai steps in and declares that his class will do it instead. A brief soap fight between Hanai and Harima (because of a misunderstanding from the latter when he hears the former speaking of "Tsukamoto-kun", not noticing he is talking about Yakumo, and not Tenma) quickly turns into a pool hockey match, with the winning team deciding what the class will do for the next school festival; a food stand or play. Hanai is firmly on the side of the play, hoping he'll have a chance to play a prince opposite Yakumo's Sleeping Beauty. Meanwhile, the non-participants become bookmakers, cheerleaders and commentators, while Fuyuki snaps revealing shots of all the female players (much to Harima's anger and Hanai's annoyance) and one lone student, Karen Ichijou, diligently tries to clean the pool. Trying to turn the water back on, Karen is startled and accidentally breaks the tap, soaking everyone.
8	"The First Shopping Trip! The First Packed Lunch! The First Heartbreak! Huh?"; Transliteration: "Hajimete no Okaimono! Hajimete no Obentō! Hajimete no Shitsuren! e?" (Japanese: はじめてのお買い物！はじめてのお弁当！はじめての失恋！えっ？)	November 23, 2004	October 2, 2007
After school, Eri decides to head for the supermarket, going after ingredients for nikujaga (beef and potato stew) following Mikoto's tips. The next day, Tenma decides to make use of the idea and has Yakumo make two lunchboxes with curry, one of them for Karasuma, so she can get next to him. However, she makes a mistake and takes Yakumo's rice instead. Karasuma manages to get around situation by making onigiri for him and Tenma with the rice. As it turns out, Harima spots them having lunch together, and feels so heartbroken the next day that he refuses to go to school and spends his day watching TV. Watching an episode of "The Three Who Were Slashed", he imagines that what he saw was nothing but a misunderstanding, and concludes that Tenma and Karasuma may be siblings after watching a Star Wars spoof. Trying to see things in an optimistic light, he is unexpectedly (or not) visited by his fighting rival, Noboru Tennouji, who had challenged him the day before. Unable to react due to his broken feelings, Harima takes the beating of his life.
9	"Comic Book Blues! Older Woman Blues! Super Bad Water Blues!"; Transliteration: "Manga de Fukō! Onēsan de Fukō! Kappasan de Dai Fukō!" (Japanese: マンガで不幸！お姉さんで不幸！かっぱさんで大不幸！)	November 30, 2004	October 2, 2007
Harima decides to drown his sorrows by drawing a Fist of the North Star-inspired manga, in which he draws himself as the hero, Karasuma as the villain and Tenma as the damsel in distress. Later, Harima sits in the rain, convinced that he is a failure (having lost Tenma and his job prospect), when a woman (who we will later know as Tae Anegasaki) approaches him and offers him shelter and an ear. In the meantime, Tenma is trying to cook by herself in order to win Karasuma over once and for all. Although he initially resists helping, since he does not want Tenma to see him anymore in his shame, he ends up jumping into the canal to save Iori; Tenma thanks him for his help, but does not recognize Harima in his new look and mistakes him for a kappa.
10	"Please, God! Please, Genuine Animal Fortune-Telling! Please, Tenma!"; Transliteration: "Onegai Kamisama! Onegai! Riaru Dōbutsu Uranai! Onegai!! Tenma-chan!" (Japanese: お願い 神さま！お願い！リアル動物占い！お願い！！天満ちゃん！)	December 7, 2004	October 2, 2007
Mikoto injures her hand while having a karate sparring match with Hanai, and is worried that she may never write again due to this. She decides to go to a temple to ask God to help her through the exams, but she receives help from Harima, who claims to have found "enlightenment" with animals and is now making a living with them as a fortune teller. Later, Tenma asks the "fortune teller" to read her fortune on love and, while Harima thinks about what he should do, she asks Karasuma if he likes more her or curry. When he cannot give her an answer (after initially replying "curry"), Tenma runs off crying, mistaking his taciturn attitude for indecisiveness. As Tae tends to Harima, he makes a decision: the next day, he will confess his feelings to Tenma and ask to leave school (since she was his only motivation to attend). To that end, he leaves a love letter in her shoe locker and waits impatiently for her reaction. When she meets him at the school rooftop, she tells him that he placed his resignation letter in the envelope of the love letter. Though dumbstruck by his mistake, Tenma relights the fire inside of him by asking him to continue attending school.
11	"Nara! Karasuma! Harima!"; Transliteration: "Nara! Karasuma! Harima!" (Japanese: 奈良！烏丸！播磨！)	December 14, 2004	November 13, 2007
At a waterpark, Tenma feels jealous for her friends (Eri, Mikoto and Akira), since she is the only one without a company there. She soon runs into her classmate Kentaro Nara, who offers to make her company. Even though Tenma accepts at first, she soon remembers Karasuma and, not wanting to betray him in thought, she resorts to only have him teach her to swim. They then later meet up with Nara's friends (who were the ones courting Tenma's friends) and, as they ask them out on a date, the girls proposes a challenge: if any of the boys win, they will all go out to the beach together. The scene then shifts to a rainy day. Without an umbrella, Tenma manages to find shelter, and is startled to see Karasuma already there. Later on at school, summer vacation is approaching and Harima listens to the girls about them having to accompany Nara's friends to the beach.
12	"Save Me at the Beach! Save Me, I'm Naked! Just Save Me For Real!"; Transliteration: "Umi de Tasukete! Hadaka de Tasukete! Honto ni Maji de Tasukete!" (Japanese: 海で助けて！ハダカで助けて！ホントにマジで助けて！)	December 21, 2004	November 13, 2007
As the group heads to the beach, they stay at a seaside resort with two rooms separated by a fusuma, which sparks Imadori's intent to spy on the girls changing into their bikinis, though Hanai stops him. At the beach, Eri notices she forgot her sunscreen in her room, so she returns to retrieve it. Back at the beach, Hanai saves Mikoto from drowning after she went to a deeper part of the sea so she could learn to swim by herself, and thus Tenma proposes him to teach her to swim. The lessons start with varying methods and degrees of success: Eri refuses to let Harima even touch her, let alone teach her. Akira makes Hanai swim alone (with the pretense of watch and learn) while she sits at the sand reading, until he tires out. Nara with Tenma is the only one successful (though she loses her swimsuit and he retrieves Harima's instead at one point). Finally, Imadori leads Mikoto into a cave far off the shore, just so he could be alone with her in there. Though Mikoto tries to think of a way out, all Imadori can think of is how to get into her bikini. And, even though she is convinced their friends wouldn't leave them stranded, they have not noticed their absence at all.
13	"Mission 1: Confession of Love! Mission 2: Night Offense and Defense! Mission 3: "Tweet!""; Transliteration: "Misshon Wan wa Ai no Kokuhaku! Misshon Tsū wa Yoru no Kōbō! Misshon Surī wa Pī-hyororo!" (Japanese: ミッション1は愛の告白！ミッション2は夜の攻防！ミッション3はピーヒョロロ！)	December 28, 2004	November 13, 2007
After Imadori and Mikoto make it back, Tenma thinks that Harima may be fond of, and therefore jealous of Mikoto, oblivious to the fact that he is trying to avoid others to get to herself. Later at night, while everybody is asleep, the boys try to get their way with the girls: as Nara tries getting closer to Tenma, Harima scares him off. A few days later, Mikoto's birthday comes around and Hanai looks for something to perform for her at her request. Finding a flute, he remembers how their friendship started: in their young days, Hanai was relentlessly bullied and ignored for not living up to the expectations of the son of a martial arts dojo headmaster. Unfortunately, his abilities with the flute waned over the years, and worst yet, Mikoto cannot remember a thing of how they met.
14	"Have You Ever Seen One? Isn't She Cute? I Look Forward to Getting to Know You!"; Transliteration: "Mita Koto aru? Kawai Kunakunai? Yoroshiku Onegaishimasu!" (Japanese: みたことある？かわいくなくない？よろしくおねがいします！)	January 3, 2005	November 13, 2007
Eri and Tenma are doing their summer homework at the latter's house, when Eri, out of the blue, asks if Tenma has ever seen a man's body, having remembered her embarrassing run-in with Harima. Much to her mortification, Tenma says yes, but Eri does not realize that her friend is having a completely opposite idea, as she is recalling one day when she went to see a wrestling match with Karasuma. Afterwards Harima asks Hanai to help him get a new part-time job, and the two of them (along with Imadori) are employed with heavy load for a moving company. Harima, feeling his job is being recognized, starts competing with Hanai on carrying real heavy furniture and refrigerators, but everything takes a twist when their employer introduces them to Ichi-san, whom he considers very reliable with load faring, and who turns out to be none other than Karen, as she is carrying a piano alone with ease.
15	"Summer, Friendship, and Fireworks!"; Transliteration: "Natsu to, Yūjō to, Uchiagehanabi to." (Japanese: 夏と、友情と、打ち上げ花火と。)	January 11, 2005	December 18, 2007
Eri and Mikoto have distanced themselves from one another. Mikoto ponders the matter, concluding the Harima is at the center of it all. Meanwhile, Harima changes his manga style which further impresses the company's editor. On the way home, he bumps into Eri, prompting him to run away, after which Eri takes chase. Tenma makes plans to go see fireworks with her friends. Eri appreciates Tenma's offer, but still shows reluctance. Mikoto then learns that her old crush, Masahiro Kozu, is in town, and cancels with Tenma, which further distances her from Eri when she learns of this. Mikoto goes to meet him only to learn that he has gotten himself a girlfriend.
16	"But It's the Tea Club... It's the Tea Club, But... It's the Tea Club, So..."; Transliteration: "Sadōbu Nanoni... Sadōbu Dakedo... Sadōbu Dakara..." (Japanese: 茶道部なのに・・・ 茶道部だけど・・・ 茶道部だから・・・)	January 18, 2005	December 18, 2007
Akira and Yakumo go on a camp for their Tea Club (Sarah could not attend since it was a last-time arrangement), and Tenma tags along, dragging Eri and Mikoto with her. Although Akira had tried to fool Hanai to keep him away from Yakumo, he catches wind of their gathering and hurries to the camp, along with Harima (who wants to clear up things with Tenma) and Imadori (who simply had nothing better to do). Once there, Harima is sent to collect firewood and Yakumo joins him, in order to ask of his empathy with animals. The courage test consisted on heading for a temple past the woods and grab a lucky charm from there. During the test, it starts raining, and Tenma and Harima are caught outside. They eventually find an abandoned school, in which Tenma tries to talk things off with Harima in a friendly, when Tenma starts sneezing, due to wearing wet clothes. He goes for more and finds a rag sticking out of a wall. Using all his might to pull it, he finds that that rag is being worn by none other than Eri, whom he promptly pushes back, proceeding to leave with Tenma, since the rain has stopped.
17	"Mid-Summer Giraffe's Night Out! End of Summer Panic Party! Summer's Over–Back to School!"; Transliteration: "Natsu no Sakari no Kirin no Kimochi! Natsu no Owari no Panikku Pātī! Natsu ga Sugitara Chenjingu Nau!" (Japanese: 夏の盛りのキリンのキモチ！夏の終わりのパニックパーティー！夏が過ぎたらチェンジング・ナウ！)	January 25, 2005	December 18, 2007
Itoko is taking care of a giraffe, and using the school gym to keep it. Yakumo feeds it a cabbage and, later, offers herself to take it for a walk later that night. The giraffe, which remembers itself as being called Pyotr, is touched with Yakumo's sympathy, but soon runs away from her, remembering its master and feeling abandoned by him. Before the new school term starts, Itoko convinces Harima to take his animals to the Yagami Shrine, despite the high risk of them being discovered there. The new school term starts. Tenma is eager to meet Karasuma again, hoping that he had not changed anything since they last met (because she had noticed how Karen changed her looks because of someone - possibly Imadori). When Karasuma comes, Tenma notices he is sporting a mustache, and tries to see it in an optimistic way, prompting her to mumble that mustaches are beautiful while asleep on her desk, which does not escape the notice of Harima, wide awake and next to her. As Harima tries to get closer to Tenma, Karasuma takes off his mustache, a fake.
18	"Karen's Love, Not Yet! Karen's Love, Little by Little! Karen's Love, and Then..."; Transliteration: "Karen no Koi, Mada Mada - Karen no Koi, Bochi Bochi - Karen no Koi, Soshite..." (Japanese: かれんの恋、まだまだ かれんの恋、ぼちぼち かれんの恋、そして・・・)	February 1, 2005	December 18, 2007
As Imadori helps her out with carrying wood bars from the gym equipment room, Karen wonders if he remembers the "promise" he made to go on a date with her. Later, Karen goes to Tenma for advice on what she should do, and she encourages Karen to go on her date, while Tenma would cover up for her in the fight. The next day, as Karen thanks Tenma for helping her out, she remembers that the one Imadori really likes is Mikoto, and feels bad with herself. Upon seeing Imadori asking another girl out, Tenma dons the mask she lent to Karen and kicks him down, but Karen stops her before she can chew on him. As Tenma apologizes to her, Karen reveals she already knew Imadori was into Mikoto, but does not seem to be depressed about that at all.
19	"Dreams for Art! Fantasy Wedding! Wish on a Star!"; Transliteration: "Geijutsu ni Yume wo! Kami ni Chikai wo! Hoshi ni Negai wo!" (Japanese: 芸術に夢を！神に誓いを！星に願いを！)	February 8, 2005	February 5, 2008
There is a terrific uproar in 2-C as news arrives that Itoko will be modelling for an art exhibition with the title "Nude". While most of the boys in class are enthralled, Harima and Hanai are uninterested until it turns out that Tenma and Yakumo will be "helping" too. Later, Sara Adiemus wants to promote her local church as an ideal venue for weddings, but has no photographs to put in the brochure. The following evening is the night of a meteor shower, and Tenma and friends make plans to go and see it and make wishes on the shooting stars. However, it rains so hard they can't go out. Everyone ends up celebrating the meteor shower in his or her own way, while Karasuma, in his kappa outfit, is the only one able to go out. Tenma writes her wishes on paper before falling asleep, and Yakumo, finding them, is deeply touched by Tenma's wish to "become a reliable sister who can take good care of Yakumo".
20	"That's Gone! This is Gone! Options, Gone!"; Transliteration: "Are ga nai! Kore mo nai! Dōshiyō mo nai!" (Japanese: あれがない！これもない！どうしようもない！)	February 15, 2005	February 5, 2008
While the girls rehearse cheerleading routines for the upcoming sports festival, Eri accidentally cuts off Harima's beard and they improvise in many wild ways to keep him from finding out. Later, as he takes another of his manga stories to be evaluated, Harima receives the advice of hiring someone to help him out with story revision. However he is very reserved about showing his stories to anyone. As Class 2-C is choosing its representatives for the sports festival, Hanai notices Harima is missing and goes after him. An after-credits segment introduces Lara Gonzalez to the audience, as it is seen that she was the one who fought Karen in episode 18 - or rather, Tenma.
21	"Hanai Fights Back! Karen Sparkles! Reunion with Big Sister!"; Transliteration: "Gyakushū no Hanai! Senkō no Karen! Saikai Onē-san" (Japanese: 逆襲の花井！閃光のかれん！再会・お姉さん)	February 22, 2005	February 5, 2008
Hanai hears rumors that Harima saved some girls from the tea club from thugs who were harassing them, and thinks he must have set up the incident, so he runs off to confront him. Arriving at an alley, he sees a figure preparing to leave on a bike, with a wake of downed punks. At school, Lara calls Karen for lunch, when Imadori comes and immediately sparks her disgust - especially after he accurately guesses her cup size as D, prompting Lara to attack him with a fork, which Karen stops point-blank with only her chopsticks. He decides to turn to Mikoto, making Lara tell Karen to take him for herself if she likes him, meanwhile offending Mikoto. Things get even worse when Imadori tries to defend her and ends up on the receiving end of a choke hold, and then Tenma, trying to save him, gets the same treatment. While the school receives a new nurse, Harima refuses to enter the 2-C room, afraid they would notice the cap he uses to cover his bald top. In the epilogue, homeroom teachers of classes 2-C and 2-D, Hayato Tani and Kato, trying to investigate the incident involving Harima and Tae.
22	"Time to Start the War! Now the Cavalry Battle! And the Great Uprising!"; Transliteration: "Iza Kaisen! Sā Kibasen! Mō Dairansen!" (Japanese: いざ開戦！さぁ騎馬戦！もう大乱戦！)	March 1, 2005	February 5, 2008
It's sports day at Yagami High, and 2-C and 2-D are determined to use the occasion to settle some old scores. The main sporting event of the afternoon is a school tradition, the Cavalry Battle, where teams of male runners carry a girl rider and the girls try to steal one another's coloured headbands while not falling off. Mikoto is narrowly saved from a flying kick to the face by Imadori but ends up being disqualified anyway, while Tenma is knocked down by the truly fearsome Tennouji. Eri and Harima successfully take out Tennouji, but are disqualified when Eri takes a dive to recover Harima's lost hat. With Harry McKenzie and Lala dominating the field, it looks to be all over for 2-C until their last remaining team, Hanai and Karen, pull off some truly astonishing moves.
23	"Women's Battle! Men's Battle! After the Battle!"; Transliteration: "Onna no tatakai! Otoko no tatakai! Tatakai owatte..." (Japanese: 女の闘い！男の戦い！たたかい終わって・・・)	March 8, 2005	March 18, 2008
Before the girls' relay race, Eri heads to the infirmary to confront Tae over her relationship with Harima and, despite truly needing medical attention (due to her fall in the joust competition), she refuses to let the nurse treat her. The result makes the 2-D class pass 2-C in the total scoreboard. Therefore, everything is at stake in the boys' relay. The 2-C team is greatly determined to win, both due to the girls watching them and to put Tougou and Harry in their places after they underestimate their rivals. At the end of the festival, as everyone dances around the fire, Harima sits by himself, then Eri shows up and asks him on a dance, even though her foot still hurts, but none of them apparently has nothing to hide anymore, so they might as well enjoy the moment for themselves.
24	"Irritation. Indecision. Wandering."; Transliteration: "Shōsō - Shunjun - Hōkō" (Japanese: 焦燥 逡巡 彷徨)	March 15, 2005	March 18, 2008
The rumors start flying about Harima and Eri being together. While she is too ashamed to go to school, he is outraged when he finds out about it. To make things worse for him, Tenma outspokenly supports their "relationship", dealing a fatal blow to Harima's confidence. Later, Tenma and the others are waiting on Eri at the cafe where Yakumo works. That night, while Tenma tries to bake a cake for Karasuma's coming birthday, Harima leaves town by ship.
25	"[Boat.] [Train.] [Guitar.]"	March 22, 2005	March 18, 2008
As the storm mounts in fury, one of the sailors falls into the sea, and Harima jumps in to save him. He earns the respect of his fellow seamen, but just then the captain calls him privately about his manga. Back to Tenma, she considers buying a present for Karasuma, and she asks Harima to go shopping with her so that he can give her advice on what to buy. Back home, Harima finds he only has one day until the deadline for delivering his manga, so he resorts to Yakumo's help. At his home, she notices how much his characters look like him and Tenma and, even though he nervously tries to fool her, she accurately deduces through the storyline that he may have feelings for her. It is not until Yakumo reminds him of the deadline that he decides to continue drawing. Suddenly, a UFO shows up before them and he claims not to be from this world.
26	"School Rumble Forever!"; Transliteration: "Totsuzen no "sayonara"... Mayoikonda rabirinsu... Anata wa dare? ...Oshiete. "Surechigai" "Kataomoi" Todoke, boku no kimochi. Todoke, watashi no omoi. Tabun ichido shika nai kisetsu, seishun no 1 pēji. Kore ga saigo no chansu, tashikametai... Kimi no kimochi. Tsutawaru kotoba, tsutawaranai omoi. Ano hi no kokuhaku, eien no ichinichi, dakedo... Itsu made mo tsuzuite iku, watashitachi no "ima". Soshite ashita e... "sukūru Ranburu Fōebā"" (Japanese: 突然の「さよなら」…迷い込んだラビリンス…あなたはだれ？…教えて。「すれちがい」「片想い」とどけ、ボクの気持ち。とどけ、ワタシの想い。たぶん一度しかない季節、青春の1ページ。これが最後のチャンス、確かめたい…キミの気持ち。伝わる言葉、伝わらない想い。あの日の告白、永遠の一日、だけど…いつまでも続いていく、わたしたちの「いま」。そして明日へ…「スクールランブルフォーエバー」)	March 29, 2005	March 18, 2008
Karasuma prepares to leave Earth, and so an alien mothership is summoned. Harima decides to take matters into his hands by stopping him from leaving, because that would make Tenma sad, and this is something he would never want due to his love for her. Harima races to take his manga to the editor, but ends up slamming against Eri's limousine. She offers to take it to the editor, not knowing its contents, to make up for the accident, all the while trying to fight her own feelings for Harima. Leaving school the next day, Tenma gathers all the courage she can to try to declare herself to Karasuma after giving him his birthday gift, which consists of a series of fish on a stick, following the dream she had. As in the dream, Karasuma accepts the fish and enjoys eating them.

=== School Rumble: 2nd Semester ===
No.	Title	Original release date
1	"Scramble Reloaded! Superstar Request! Scandalous Restart!"; Transliteration: "Scramble ga Reloaded! Superstar ni Request! Scandalous na Restart!" (Japanese: ScrambleがReloaded! SuperstarにRequest! ScandalousなRestart!)	April 2, 2006
One morning at school, Harima receives through Itoko a card from the manga publisher telling him that he was considered eligible for a prize for his manga. Later, Tenma decides that she should work out her own shyness issues, so she goes see Karasuma at the music club room. Seeing him in a white suit, with which he will perform with the school band at the school festival, makes Tenma think he will be a successful rockstar while her lack of talent will leave her behind. The next day, Hanai is excited with the prospect of performing Sleeping Beauty with Yakumo, and goes off to try to convince the organizers to allow students from different classes to perform together.
2	"Strategies, Battlefields, Friends."; Transliteration: ""Sakubō Senjō Hōyū"" (Japanese: ｢策謀 戦場 朋友｣)	April 9, 2006
2-C still cannot decide what to do for the school festival, and Harima and Hanai are still sunk in the depths of misery. Akira hits on a very unconventional idea to solve both problems as she tells Harima about the script and Hanai about the participation of The tea Club for the coffee shop, which came down by their excitement into one solution to their problems: a survival war game, held in the school building after dark. The class are issued with replica weapons. The guys carefully look around the room until Sawachika appears standing on the window frame, but they hear a man's voice. Asou and Saga know that they're done for and turn around to discover that it's not Sawachika, but a man in a female's school uniform.
3	"Beautiful Beast vs. Beastly Beauty! God of War vs. God of Warfare! Teacher vs. Student!"; Transliteration: "Bijū vs Bijū Gunshin vs Bushin Sensei vs Seito" (Japanese: 美獣vs美獣 軍神vs武神 先生vs生徒)	April 16, 2006
The Yagami High civil war continues. The mysterious blond-haired figure with the elite battlefield skills turns out not to be Eri at all, but an intruder in a borrowed school uniform. Tenma encounters Karasuma defenceless in a corridor and is unable to attack him, even though she knows her team are counting on her, Moved by her chivalry, Karasuma was shot and out from the game which she moan over his defeat before being shot in the head. The following morning, the class was scolded by Mr. Koriyama, who was about to suspend them from the festival, but Ikoto managed to confess about their actions, so he spared them in exchange for them to do both festival activities.
4	"Wild Ideas about the Play! Wild Ideas at the Bathhouse! Wild Ideas about Rice Balls!"; Transliteration: "Engeki de Mōsō! Sentō de Mōsō! Onigiri de Mōsō!" (Japanese: 演劇で妄想! 銭湯で妄想! オニギリで妄想!)	April 23, 2006
In order to decide which kind of play will be made, the 2-C students is encouraged to pitch in their own ideas. Mai and Tsumugi go through a variety of wild scenarios, and eventually decide to ask Akira to write one for them, combining as many of the ideas as she would like. Later, as Tenma tries to figure out through Eri what kind of girl Harima likes, in order to help Yakumo with him, Nishimoto invites his classmates to a bathhouse. Back at school, the girls prepare rice balls for the boys, but each of them made a different kind of rice ball, so they have to guess who made whichever rice ball they picked. Praising it just to impress her only makes things worse for Harima, as she gives him a dozen or so more.
5	"Hostesses Are Culture! Comics Are Culture! Cake is Also Culture!"; Transliteration: "Omizu wa Bunka Manga wa Bunka Kēki mo Bunka" (Japanese: オミズは文化 マンガは文化 ケーキもブンカ)	April 30, 2006
The Yagami High Festival begins. Meanwhile, Harima is nervously waiting for news from the manga editor contest in which he entered. Going to an exhibit labeled "Tokiha Boarding House", he meets with Yakumo, cosplaying as Osamu Tezuka, who encourages him to keep drawing for whatever drives him forward. Later at the class, he catches wind of Karasuma's birthday and, distressed, tries to stop Tenma from unveiling the cake, by pretending to trip. As it turns out, the cake he spilled this time was for Yoshidayama (who had won a "sumo bathing suit contest" previously), and Tenma promptly offers him his cake. Then, as she fetches the cake for Karasuma... she finds it, too, now reads "Harima" (this was the cake Harima tripped on earlier). To solve the problem, she cuts out the cake in a crescent shape, so that only the "MA" remains, and eats up the rest. Later as she sulks, Karasuma comes along and, noticing Tenma has a photo of him with a faint smile, he thanks her for the day.
6	"Sleeping Beast! Kiss Impossible! Finale!" (Japanese: スリーピング·ビースト キッス·インポッシブル フィナーレ)	May 7, 2006
Harima was exhausted from writing a 200 pages and went to sleep while Sawachika dressed up as a musketeer as well as the other six musketeer including Tenma. The audience doesn't know what will happen next, but they suggested that Yakumo should kiss Harima. Harima was stress and Yakumo was going to kiss him until Akira came rappelling down in front of him, kissed him and rappelling back up as the princess lives happily ever after with a spy and the audience were proud about the play. The band performs on stage as a closing ceremony for everyone except for Harima, who was crucified on the ceiling as punishment.
7	"Fight, Hunter! Fight, Eater! Fight, Part-Time Worker!"; Transliteration: "Tatakae, Hantā! Tatakae, Ītā! Tatakae, Arubaitā!" (Japanese: 闘え, ハンター! 闘え, イーター! 闘え, アルバイター!)	May 14, 2006
The girls go out for camping in the mountains, tasking Harima and Hanai with carrying their things (with Imadori taking a ride inside Hanai's baggage). However, Tenma had forgotten to take the lunch box her sister made, prompting Harima to offer to cook when she and Eri volunteer for the task. At the competition, Imadori makes good curry and rice, but when he confesses he made it from industrialized curry, he is disqualified. Later, the episode focuses on each character's lives outside of school where they all have part-time jobs. Harima applies for an animation studio, knowing it will help developing his manga artist abilities. Sarah and Asou are at a Chinese restaurant, but since their boss is on leave due to his wife having a baby, she decides to shopkeep in his place despite Asou's protest. At the end of the day, Sara and Asou's boss comes back and regretfully informs that his wife had not given birth because it was a false alarm.
8	"Bam ★ Birth of a Girls' Basketball Club! Bam ★ If You Please! Bam ★ Swing Set of Tears!"; Transliteration: "Hatchake☆Joshi Basuke-bu Tanjō! Hatchake☆Yoroshiku Senpai Hatchake☆Namida no Buranko..." (Japanese: はっちゃけ☆女子バスケ部誕生! はっちゃけ☆よろしく先輩· はっちゃけ☆涙のブランコ...)	May 21, 2006
After reading a manga whose hero is a basketball player, Tenma is fired up to play basketball, and she is seen by one of her sister's classmates, Satsuki Tawaraya, who wants to form a basketball team. While coaching the girls in their training, Satsuki secretly pines after Asou - but not so secretly, since Tae and Tenma listen in on her, the nurse giving her advice from "Son Ko", or rather, Sun Tzu's The Art of War, in order to give her the motivation to pursue her affections. Though she hasn't been playing, Tenma is still in a rage for basketball, but she is ejected from the team by Tae, who gives her the excuse of a "special training" which she will have to undertake until one of the team members gets tired. Not wanting to tell Yakumo the truth (especially as she gives her lunchboxes every day to refill her energy), Tenma just spends her days sitting in a swing, depressed, and eating to the point of putting on weight. One night, as she wonders when will her "training" will be over, Tougou approaches her and, along with Harima and Imadori, proposes the formation of a new basketball team with the intent of crushing the girls' team.
9	"Pass! Dribble! Shoot!"	May 28, 2006
10	"Hee! Hee Hee! Hee Hee Hee!"	June 11, 2006
11	"Napoleon, Between Life and Death... Nishimoto, Between Sex and Self-Control... Sara, Between Saintliness and Self..."; Transliteration: "Naporeon, Sei to Shi no Aida de... Nishimoto, Sei to Shi no Aida de... Sara, Sei to Shi no Aida de..." (Japanese: ナポレオン, 生と死の間で... 西本, 性と志の間で... サラ, 聖と私の間で...)	June 18, 2006
12	"Perfect, Forbidden! Entry, Forbidden! Shorts, Forbidden!"; Transliteration: "Pāfekuto, Kinshi! Tachiiri, Kinshi! Hanzubon, Kinshi!" (Japanese: パーフェクト, 禁止! 立ち入り, 禁止! 半ズボン, 禁止!)	June 25, 2006
13	"When I Turned Around, There He Was. In Karasuma's Name. All Mysteries Revealed!"; Transliteration: "Furikaereba Yatsu ga Iru. Karasuma no Na ni Kakete. Nazo wa Subete Toketa!" (Japanese: 振りかえればヤツがいる. カラスマの名にカケて. 謎はすべて解けた!)	July 2, 2006
Harima ends up seeing the school flunk out ghost and starts preparing everything he can to not fail the semester and pass along with Tenma. He ends up asking his cousin to help him out. Tenma does an all night study session with Eri-chan and the rest of the group. Once exams were over Mikoto finally explains how her date went with Asou.
14	"At El Cado... In America (26f)... With America (26h)..." Transliteration: "at Merukado in Amerika (26F) with Amerika (26h)" (Japanese: at メルカド in アメリカ(26F) with アメリカ(26h))	July 9, 2006
It's Tenma's birthday party, and everyone but Karasuma is present. Harima gets interrupted by a phone call during the celebration, saying that Karasuma needs a helper at the Manga office. When Harima gets there, he accidentally spills ink on Karasuma's work, but Karasuma doesn't seem to mind. Harima confronts Karasuma that it's Tenma's birthday, and he should visit as one of Tenma's peers. Karasuma secretly leaves the office to say happy birthday to Tenma, and Harima starts a new layout to make Karasuma's boring Manga piece to look like his own.
15	"A Man Shut Out, A Man Left Out, A Man Tested Out"; Transliteration: "Shimedasareta Otoko, Manekareta Otoko, Tamesareta Otoko" (Japanese: 締めだされた男 招かれた男 試された男)	July 16, 2006
16	"I Don't Want to be Tied to Anyone, I Don't Want to Go to School or Home Anymore, Under the Dark Veil of Night."; Transliteration: "Dare ni mo Shibararetaku nai, Mō Gakkō ya Ie ni wa Kaeritakunai, Kurai Yoru no Tobari no Naka de" (Japanese: 誰にも縛られたくない〜 もう学校や家には帰りたくない〜 暗い夜の帳の中で〜)	July 23, 2006
17	"Eri's Escape, Harima's Lullaby, The False Bride."; Transliteration: "...Eri no Tōhikō ...Harima no Rarabai ...Itsuwari no Hanayome" (Japanese: ...愛理の逃避行 ...播磨のララバイ ...偽りの花嫁)	July 30, 2006
-Nakamura sees Eri ride away with Harima, but he cannot catch them. He calls up Masaru (the maid), but then Masaru goes and kidnaps Tenma. The two nearly get hit by a truck, but Harima narrowly avoids it. Tenma gets a mail from Mikoto and also figures out Masaru’s mistake. She decides to continue pretending to be Eri and break this all off.
18	"The Sweet Trap of Work, The Sweet Trap of the Classroom, The Sweet Trap of Celebrity."; Transliteration: "Baito no Amai Wana, Kyōshitsu no Amai Wana, Serebu no Amai Wana" (Japanese: バイトの甘いワナ 教室の甘いワナ セレブの甘いワナ)	August 6, 2006
Eri is pestered by Mikoto for details about what she did with Harima the night before, and is disappointed to find out nothing happened. Sarah gets a text from Akira to meet up at the old school house for a chance at a prize. When Sarah walks in, she notices an object and as she goes to see what it is, she falls through the floor and gets stuck halfway between the second story floor and first story ceiling. Nara, Nishimoto, and Yoshidayama are at a restaurant and moan about how they can't find any girls to date. They see Harry and Togo talking to two girls and inviting them to a party. Yoshidayama proclaims since they're men, they can do it. Amused, Togo decides to test them to see if they're really men.
19	"Here, There and Everywhere, Christmas! A Dash for Christmas! A Shattered Christmas!"; Transliteration: "Kotchi mo Atchi mo Kurisumasu! Bakushin for Kurisumasu! Kudakero Kurisumasu!" (Japanese: こっちもあっちもX'マス! 驀進FOR X'マス! 砕けろX'マス!)	August 13, 2006
Harima finally finishes his script and wants Tenma to be the first one to read it. However, they say that he has to bring the script to the publishers as quickly as possible. Harima decides to let Tenma see it after all. Tenma made a big curry plate as a Christmas present for Karasuma. After Kenji shows the script to Tenma there was a blizzard going on in the city, making it impossible for Kenji to go to the party they told him to go to give the script to them. He uses Tenma's curry bowl as a sled, having it successful for him to give it to the chief editor. But unfortunately broke the plate into pieces. The chief editor doesn't want to publish Harima's manga that he brought. Itoko brings Tenma and Yakumo to the party, letting her see her curry dish in pieces. She leaves crying. Kenji chases after her when he finds out that it was Tenma's. Meanwhile the chief editor says to Karasuma that he has good friends. It ends with Harima hugging Tenma and them making up and become friends again.
20	"More Than Friends... Less Than Lovers... Up Until Then."; Transliteration: "Tomodachi Ijō... Koibito Miman... Sore Izen..." (Japanese: 友達以上... 恋人未満... それ以前...)	August 20, 2006
21	"This is School Rumble... It Really is School Rumble... It's School Rumble, I Tell You!"; Transliteration: "...Sukuran desu. ...Sukuran desu yo. ...Sukuran desu tteba!" (Japanese: ...スクランです. ......スクランですよ. .........スクランですってば!)	August 20, 2006
22	"First Dreams. Lion's Dance. New Year's."; Transliteration: "Hatsuyume, Shishi Mai, Oshōgatsu" (Japanese: 初夢 獅子舞 お正月)	August 27, 2006
23	"Dream Jumbo. Dream Jump. Dream Express." (Japanese: ドリームジャンボ ドリームジャンプ ドリームエクスプレス)	September 3, 2006
24	"Southern Rainbow 2-C! Ya'akumo of the Mysterious Island! The Seven Seas!"; Transliteration: "Minami no Niji no 2-C! Fushigi na Shima no Yākumo! Nanatsu no Umi no...!" (Japanese: 南の虹の2-C! ふしぎな島のヤークモ! 七つの海の...!)	September 10, 2006
25	"It's So Romantic, Harima! Get Published in Zinegama, Harima! Come On, Harima!"; Transliteration: "Romanchikku da ne, Harima-kun! Jingama ni Notta, Harima-kun! Kyamōn, Harima-kun!" (Japanese: ロマンチックだね, 播磨くん! ジンガマに載った, 播磨くん!キャモ〜ン, 播磨くん!)	September 17, 2006
26	"Period."	September 24, 2006

== Specials ==
=== School Rumble: Extra Class ===
No.	Title	Original release date
1	"New-Term Excitement! To Be Near You Scramble! The Naked Truth!"; Transliteration: "Mata Shingakki de Dokidoki! Soba ni itakute Jitabata! Hadaka no Kimi ni Dokyūn!" (Japanese: また新学期でドキドキ！そばにいたくてジタバタ！ハダカの君にドキューン！)	December 22, 2005
2	"Smile, Please! Mammoth, Yum! May I fall in Love?"; Transliteration: "Sumairu Kudasai! Manmosu Tabetai! Koishitemo Iidesuka?" (Japanese: スマイルください！マンモスたべたい！恋してもいいですか？)	December 22, 2005

=== School Rumble: 3rd Semester ===
No.	Title	Original release date
1	"Receive! My Feelings! Shatter! My Feelings! Full Speed Ahead for Love!"; Transliteration: "Todoke! Watashi no Omoi! Kudakechire! Ore no Omoi! Ai wa Shissō Suru!" (Japanese: 届け！私の想い！砕け散れ！俺の想い！愛は疾走する！)	July 17, 2008
2	"The Final Episode"; Transliteration: "Saishūkai" (Japanese: 最終回)	September 17, 2008
