= List of Tōka Gettan episodes =

This article contains an ongoing episode listing to the 2007 Japanese animated television series Tōka Gettan based on the adult visual novel of the same name. The anime was produced by the Japanese animation studio Studio Deen and aired between April 3 and September 24, 2007. The series contains 26 episodes and is directed by Yūji Yamaguchi. The episodes of the anime were aired in an anachronic and nonlinear order: chronologically, episode 26 is first, then 24 through episode one, and episode 25 is last.

== Episodes ==
No.	Title	Original release date
1	"Cherry Blossom"; Transliteration: "Sakura" (Japanese: 桜)	April 3, 2007
The events of the story have already passed, and the characters realize the change in Kamitsumihara. Tōka mourns the loss of Momoka and returns to his original state as a doll created by Kikyō. Kiyotsugu is relieved of the mask shard in his eye, thus remembering his true name, and realizing "Yuriko" is actually his niece, Yumiko. In the end, Momoka and Tōka are reborn, and Momoka fulfills her promise by kissing Tōka at the train stop.
2	"Song"; Transliteration: "Uta" (Japanese: 歌)	April 10, 2007
Tōka takes part in a supernatural ceremony in order to protect the land he lives in. However, due to the ritual, Momoka along with several others disappear.
3	"Sword"; Transliteration: "Ken" (Japanese: 剣)	April 17, 2007
The concert is about to start tomorrow and everyone is getting prepared for what they must do. Yurika gets released from her prison and goes after Momoka to fight her.
4	"Crown"; Transliteration: "Kanmuri" (Japanese: 冠)	April 24, 2007
Momoka is captured by Mihashi, the last of the Shikigami, and Tōka must go to save her. When he arrives at Mihashi's lair, Tōka uses the Stone Sword to destroy the crown Momoka wore, effectively removing her from Mihashi's grasp and then killed Mihashi.
5	"Buddha"; Transliteration: "Hotoke" (Japanese: 仏)	May 1, 2007
Makoto is informed that she is going to participate in the upcoming concert. Momoka tells Kikyō that she wants to go back to Kinomiya. Juna, Fū, and Sei have finally assembled again in the same place for the first time in centuries.
6	"Butterfly"; Transliteration: "Chō" (Japanese: 蝶)	May 8, 2007
The Lotus Association, led by Shōko, goes up against Ninomiya, led by the Butterfly Triplets, in a cooking contest to see which one of them can make the best Japanese confectionery. Before the contest, Kochō has some fun with Momoka, giving her the task of capturing the moon's reflection in Yumiko's bath water. At the contest, Kikyō judges the winner to be the Triplets.
7	"Darkness"; Transliteration: "Yami" (Japanese: 闇)	May 15, 2007
Juna awakens within Yumiko and tries to kill Momoka, but Tōka interferes. Yumiko, as Juna, and Momoka, as Sei, release a vast amount of magical energy which opens up a gateway into another world. Tōka and Momoka try to find Yumiko as Kikyō and Makoto go into the gateway to save them from Yumiko's wrath.
8	"Ice"; Transliteration: "Kōri" (Japanese: 氷)	May 21, 2007
Snow has covered the surrounding area and Momoka wants to go ice skating with Tōka during the school's ice skating event. However, it is her first time ice skating and she must get help from Tōka.
9	"Snow"; Transliteration: "Yuki" (Japanese: 雪)	May 28, 2007
The Christmas party to be held on Christmas Eve is coming and to prepare Momoka knits a very long muffler to give to Tōka as a present. Later, she finds that it has disappeared and tries to search for it. Meanwhile, the party is going on, and Tōka attempts to search for Momoka. They eventually meet near the end of the evening as Momoka saves Tōka's life.
10	"Blood"; Transliteration: "Chi" (Japanese: 血)	June 4, 2007
A new enemy, Yurika, has entered Kamitsumihara and is almost killed by Kaya, Nene's little sister. Yurika later finds Asuna taking shelter from the rain and "eats" her, by biting her on the neck with her fangs. This turns the girl into a supernatural being whose first target is Haruhiko at school.
11	"Festival"; Transliteration: "Matsuri" (Japanese: 祭)	June 11, 2007
The time for the school festival has arrived, and Momoka leaves the house early to get early pickings on the food. Tōka meets up with Momoka in the festival and the two of them go around to several of the attractions together.
12	"Life"; Transliteration: "Inochi" (Japanese: 命)	June 18, 2007
A mysterious dog appears in Tōka's room, and while he initially tries to capture it, he finds that the dog is too fast for him. While at first annoyed at the dog's presence, Tōka eventually comes to love the dog and gives it the name Nero. After Tōka loses one of his shoes one day while rescuing Nero, the dog later goes out to find the shoe, but is killed in the process by a pack of wolves. Tōka and Momoka both mourn the loss.
13	"Mansion"; Transliteration: "Yakata" (Japanese: 館)	June 25, 2007
Tōka and his friends take a trip to a mansion deep in the Japanese mountains, which also has hot springs available. Before long, people start disappearing for unknown reasons, but eventually the landlady of the mansion is found to be the culprit.
14	"Journey"; Transliteration: "Tabi" (Japanese: 旅)	July 2, 2007
Hazuki and Lilith from Yami to Bōshi to Hon no Tabibito make an appearance as they travel into the land of Kamitsumihara in an attempt to track down Hazuki's lover Hatsumi. Before long, Hazuki and Lilith travel to an earlier time in the middle of the feudal era where they meet a young Nene and her empress mother.
15	"Calendar"; Transliteration: "Koyomi" (Japanese: 暦)	July 9, 2007
On the tenth of the month, Yumiko has to finish her next novel before the deadline, but she needs more time to finish it. The next day, she is still not done, and does not rip the calendar date onto the following day, which inadvertently repeats the events of the previous day, though only Makoto and Yumiko have any knowledge of this.
16	"Star"; Transliteration: "Hoshi" (Japanese: 星)	July 16, 2007
Kaya, Nene's younger sister, comes back after a very long time to fulfill an anniversary that only comes around once every 449 years when a certain comet makes its closest approach to Earth. Kaya continuously bother Nene throughout the day because she wants to be close to her, but since Nene has work to do, she shuns Kaya's advances. Later when Tōka is looking through the telescope to view the comet, he does not see the stars but instead views a hide and seek game played 1347 years ago between Nene and Kaya.
17	"Moon"; Transliteration: "Tsuki" (Japanese: 月)	July 23, 2007
Makoto awakens after a strange dream and is feeling sick. She manages to go to school, but while there, she loses most of her energy and nearly falls unconscious while on school grounds. Shōko finds her, and brings her to the nurse's office, and before long a white light starts glowing around Makoto's stomach. At the same time, Sei within Momoka, Juna within Yumiko, and the stone sword within Tōka awaken for a brief period; Makoto's own dragon within her also awakens. Afterwards, things seem to go back to normal, and the nurse writes off the circumstance as Makoto experiencing her first menstrual cycle.
18	"Sea"; Transliteration: "Umi" (Japanese: 海)	July 30, 2007
When Nene goes to wake Yumiko up in the morning, she finds a large sea right outside the house which is due to Yumiko inadvertently using her powers to change the physical world. At school, the new pool area has opened, and the students get to take a day off, but since Tōka does not like crowded areas, he leaves to go back home without telling anyone. Momoka tries to search for him most of the day at school, but only later finds out he went home. Momoka is transported to the sea by the house via Yumiko's powers and eventually finds Tōka, but both of their swimsuits are either eaten off by fish or dissolve off, again due to Yumiko. In the end, the sea disappears at night before Nene can take a dip.
19	"Curtain"; Transliteration: "Maku" (Japanese: 幕)	August 6, 2007
A play is presented at Tōka's school which chronicles the life of Yumiko from before she was born when her parents were very young through her traumatic events in her life up to the present day.
20	"Peach"; Transliteration: "Momo" (Japanese: 桃)	August 13, 2007
The three Butterfly Sisters host a peach picking event where the participants can pick and eat as many peaches as they like, but one third of the harvest must be given back to the Butterfly Sisters in return. While out in the orchard Tōka runs into the Butterfly Sisters and gets trapped in a strange dimension with them. There, he finds out the truth of his existence.
21	"Garden"; Transliteration: "Sono" (Japanese: 園)	August 20, 2007
Momoka had heard a story from Haruhiko about how a peach tree garden will appear on a certain hill on a night with a full moon, and Momoka goes out to that hill on such a night to think about her existence. There, she runs into Tōka, and Momoka reveals that she wants to prove her own existence one day. After that night, Momoka begins to think about Tōka constantly, and wants to be touched by him, but she does not understand why. After having a talk with Nene, she discovers that she is in love with Tōka. This episode was almost entirely in black and white and contained very little color.
22	"Shadow"; Transliteration: "Kage" (Japanese: 陰)	August 27, 2007
The Butterfly Sisters are spying on Tōka, and notice that Momoka has become quite close with him. Later in school, other students start to bully Momoka, with her treatment getting worse day by day. Meanwhile, Tōka is invited over by Ninomiya to play a game against Asuna, with the girl being the prize. Tōka refuses and escapes in the end, after sensing Momoka's cries for help. Having Tōka by her side again to comfort her seems to restore Momoka's peace.
23	"Bride"; Transliteration: "Yome" (Japanese: 嫁)	September 3, 2007
When Momoka and Tōka arrive at school, they meet Makoto who is going to act as their guide around the school grounds, showing them the major areas. Along the way, they stop in the library and Makoto reveals some of the history of Kamitsumihara. Kikyō shows up out of nowhere and the Butterfly Sisters accurately predict a sun shower depending on Kikyō's behavior. Momoka eventually gets captured by some fox spirits, and it is up to Kikyō to save her.
24	"Twill"; Transliteration: "Aya" (Japanese: 綾)	September 10, 2007
The new school year has started at Tōka Academy and Tōka, Momoka, and Makoto spend their first day at a new school. To mark the beginning of the new school year, the Butterfly Sisters group and Shōko's group have a challenge which is a variant of Rock, Paper, Scissors. At the end of the day Momoka goes outside and seeing Tōka in the courtyard gazing up at the sky with the three Butterfly Sisters in their butterfly forms flying around him. After they leave in a sparkling flash, Momoka recounts how the world is so beautiful.
25	"X"; Transliteration: "Shime" (Japanese: 〆)	September 17, 2007
Haruhiko and Shōko host a talk show which goes over the history of Kamitsumihara while interviewing many of the characters who knew Tōka or Momoka. These interviews serve to tie up any loose ends in the plot and brings everything together. Chronologically, this episode occurs after the first episode.
26	"Bloom"; Transliteration: "Hana" (Japanese: 華)	September 24, 2007
Tōka is born one night from the fusion of an unfinished doll and the stone sword, and he goes to live with Nene and Yumiko. Momoka comes into being and appears suddenly on the train Makoto and Asuna are taking to Kamitsumihara. After arriving at the school, Makoto enrolls, and while at first Momoka's name is not on the register, it suddenly appears there and she is enrolled. Makoto and Momoka are going to live in Yumiko's mansion.
