= List of Blood Blockade Battlefront episodes =

Blood Blockade Battlefront is an anime television series based on the manga series of the same title written and illustrated by Yasuhiro Nightow. The series first season premiered on April 4, 2015, and ended on October 3, 2015 due to the final episode exceeding the length of its normal 30 minute timeslot as its original airdate was scheduled for broadcast on July 4. A 25-minute original video animation titled "King of the Restaurant of Kings" was bundled with the official Blood Blockade Battlefront guidebook that was released on June 3, 2016. A second season aired from October 7 to December 24, 2017, and it ran for 12 episodes.

The series uses four musical themes: two openings and two ending theme songs. For season one, the opening is "Hello, World!" by Bump of Chicken while the ending is "Sugar Song to Bitter Step" by Unison Square Garden. For season two, the opening is "Fake Town Baby" by Unison Square Garden while the ending is "Step Up Love." by Daoko and Yasuyuki Okamura.

== Episode list ==
=== Blood Blockade Battlefront ===
No.	Title	Storyboarded by	Directed by	Written by	Original air date
1	"Secret Society of the Magic-Sealed City"; Transliteration: "Mafuugai kessha" (Japanese: 魔封街結社)	Rie Matsumoto	Ikurō Satō	Kazunao Furuya	April 5, 2015
Leonardo Watch is a young man whose special power, the "All Seeing Eyes" catches the attention of Libra, a special organization that enforces order on Hellsalem's Lot, a region of New York where all sort of supernatural beings coexist with humans.
2	"After the Phantom Ghost Wagon"; Transliteration: "Maboroshi no gosuto wagon wo oe" (Japanese: 幻のゴーストワゴンを追え)	Rie Matsumoto	Hideaki Uehara	Kazunao Furuya	April 12, 2015
Some monsters involved in a shady business kidnap Leonardo once he figures them out with his power and his friends from Libra run against time to save him.
3	"A Game Between Two Worlds"; Transliteration: "Futatsu no sekai no ma no gēmu" (Japanese: 二つの世界の間のゲーム)	Rie Matsumoto, Tetsuo Hirakawa	Masahiro Mukai	Kazunao Furuya	April 19, 2015
A dangerous drug appears in the streets and to stop it from being distributed, Klaus von Reinhertz, the leader of Libra, bets his own life in a long game against an unbeatable opponent. Meanwhile, Leonardo meets and befriends White, a beautiful and enigmatic girl.
4	"Blood Line Fever"	Rie Matsumoto	Daisuke Tsukushi	Kazunao Furuya	April 25, 2015
The members of Libra discover, thanks to Leo's power, that vampires appeared in the city and the vampire hunter Blitz "Lucky" Abrahms arrives to assist them.
5	"The Tremorous Blood Hammer"; Transliteration: "Shingeki no Blood Hammer" (Japanese: 震撃の血槌)	Rie Matsumoto	Son Seung-heui	Kazunao Furuya	May 2, 2015
Aligula, best known as the "Queen of Monomania", starts a rampage through the city seeking the object of her desire, Dog Hummer, whose body she fused with another crush of hers, Deldro Brody into a single being. While Leo is being captive by Aligula, the members of Libra seek Dog and Deldro's help to stop her.
6	"Don't Forget to Don't Forget Me"	Kenji Nagasaki	Tomoyuki Kurokawa	Kazunao Furuya	May 9, 2015
Leo meets a mushroom-like alien named Amagranoff Luozontam Ouv Lee Nej and the two become friends, usually eating hamburgers together, until a duo of thugs decide to make a quick buck using Nej's secret power, drawing them to trouble.
7	"A No-Holds-Barred Eden"; Transliteration: "Kenkyaku no Eden" (Japanese: 拳客のエデン)	Rie Matsumoto, Yoshikazu Miyao	Ikurō Satō	Kazunao Furuya	May 16, 2015
After failing to beat Klaus in a fight multiple times, a fed-up Zapp tricks Klaus into thinking he was kidnapped by an underground fighting ring so he would sign up to fight. Klaus enters while Leo tags along, but the two get more than they bargained for after Leo discovers the ringmaster is an Elder Blood in disguise.
8	"Z's Longest Day (Part 1)"; Transliteration: "Z no Ichiban Nagai Hi (Zenpen)" (Japanese: Zの一番長い日 前編)	Rie Matsumoto, Kōtarō Tamura	Jirō Fujimoto	Kazunao Furuya	May 23, 2015
Zapp has spent his days leisurely until a Blood Breed appears at the city and he is tasked by his master to seal it off.
9	"Z's Longest Day (Part 2)"; Transliteration: "Z no Ichiban Nagai Hi (Kouhen)" (Japanese: Zの一番長い日 後編)	Rie Matsumoto, Michio Fukuda	Masashi Abe	Kazunao Furuya	May 30, 2015
"Blood Battle God" Raju Jugei Shizuyoshi, founder of the Big Dipper Style Blood Technique and Zapp's master brings in a new pupil of his to help with the Elder Blood threat in Hellsalem's Lot.
10	"Run Lunch Run, To The End" (Japanese: ラン!ランチ!!ラン!!! / to the end.)	Rie Matsumoto, Tomohiko Itō	Ikurō Satō	Kazunao Furuya	June 6, 2015
Leo, Zapp and Zed's lunch time turn to the bizarre when they come into several restaurants, one weirder than the other, until they are dragged to a heated battle along Klaus and Steven. Afterwards, Leo is cornered by the King of Despair and White, who want to use him for their own personal reasons.
10.5	"Even These are the Best and the Worst Days Ever" (Japanese: それさえも最低で最高な日々)	N/A	N/A	N/A	June 13, 2015
Recap episode
11	"Paint it Black"	Rie Matsumoto, Tomohiko Itō	Masashi Abe	Kazunao Furuya	June 20, 2015
As the origins of White and her brother are revealed, the King of Despair uses the power of Leo's eyes to ignite a huge catastrophe on Hellsalem's Lot during Halloween.
12	"Hello, World!"	Rie Matsumoto	Rie Matsumoto	Kazunao Furuya	October 4, 2015
The members of Libra gather to defend Leo as he rushes to reach the King of Despair in order to confront him, not only for Black and White's sake, but to save the city as well.
OVA	"King of the Restaurant of Kings"; Transliteration: "Ō-sama no Restaurant no Ō-sama" (Japanese: 王様のレストランの王様)	Rie Matsumoto, Taizō Yoshida	Rie Matsumoto	Rie Matsumoto, Misaki Morie	June 3, 2016
Libra courts some extremely wealthy potential sponsors at an otherworldly restaurant, only to discover the food served there is so delicious it drives them insane. On top of that, Leonardo finds an unlikely ally in Femt when the kitchen staff is imperiled by an outside threat.

=== Blood Blockade Battlefront & Beyond ===
No.	Title	Storyboarded by	Directed by	Written by	Original release date
1	"Lights! Camera! Action!"; Transliteration: "Raitsu, Kamera, Akushon!" (Japanese: ライツ、カメラ、アクション！)	Masato Takayanagi	Ikurō Satō	Yasuko Kamo	October 7, 2017
Leo's day off turns hectic when he is tasked to escort the live head of the U.S. Presidential Envoy while avoiding waves of thugs after him.
2	"A Phantom Hospital Ward Rises"; Transliteration: "Maboroshi kai byōtō raizezu" (Japanese: 幻界病棟ライゼズ)	Masato Takayanagi	Yūji Ōya	Yasuko Kamo	October 14, 2017
Leo takes a seriously injured Zapp to a mysterious hospital that appeared out of thin air. Klaus and Stephen then tell Leo a story of what happened there during the cataclysm that created Hellsalem's Lot three years ago.
3	"Day In Day Out"	Miwa Sasaki	Miwa Sasaki	Yasuko Kamo	October 21, 2017
Refusing to use his special powers at his own benefit, Leo decides to take matters with his own hands to get back the money some thugs stole from him, while Zapp is forced to look for a friend's cat with his own nether parts on the line and Steven welcomes some guests with second intentions for a party at his house.
4	"Werewolf Mission: Chainpossible"; Transliteration: "Chein: posshiburu" (Japanese: 人狼大作戦(チェイン：ポッシブル))	Shinji Ishihira	Satoshi Takafuji	Yasuko Kamo	October 28, 2017
Chain and her fellow werewolves are tasked to a special mission, unaware that an old enemy of theirs is waiting for an ambush.
5	"One Butler's Blitzkrieg"; Transliteration: "Toaru shitsuji no burittsukurīgu" (Japanese: とある執事の電撃作戦(ブリッツクリーグ))	Masahiro Mukai	Masahiro Mukai	Yoriko Tomita	November 4, 2017
After Gilbert is seriously wounded, Philip Lenore, another butler is sent by the Reinherz family to assist him while he recuperates. When knowing that Philip fell in a trap and his brain is under some criminals' custody, Gilbert assembles a team to rescue him personally.
6	"Get the Lock Out!!"; Transliteration: "Getto za rokkuauto!!" (Japanese: ゲット・ザ・ロックアウト！！)	Naomi Nakayama	Takahiro Hasui	Yasuko Kamo	November 11, 2017
The members of Libra are locked out of their headquarters by bizarre insectoid monsters and must find a way back inside before a catastrophic event devastates the city.
7	"Branchial Blues"; Transliteration: "Era kokyū burūsu" (Japanese: 鰓呼吸ブルース)	Kō Matsuo	Yūji Ōya	Yoriko Tomita	November 18, 2017
The special headphones that allows Zed to breathe out of water is stolen by a sociopathic CEO of an arms dealing company forcing Leo, Zapp and Chain to steal it back. Meanwhile, Zed recounts the day he first met Raju Jugei Shizuyoshi.
8	"Desperate Fight in the Macro Zone, Part 1"; Transliteration: "Makuro no kesshi ken zenpen" (Japanese: マクロの決死圏 前編)	Satomi Nakamura	Masahiro Mukai	Yasuko Kamo	November 25, 2017
Chaos ensues when Riel, one of Leonardo's friends is transformed into a giant, vicious monster by a microscopic terrorist.
9	"Desperate Fight in the Macro Zone, Part 2"; Transliteration: "Makuro no kesshi ken kōhen" (Japanese: マクロの決死圏 後編)	Naomi Nakayama	Naomi Nakayama	Yasuko Kamo	December 2, 2017
Leo and his friends join forces in a combined effort to bring Riel back to normal before he destroys the city.
10	"Bratatat Mom"	Miwa Sasaki	Miwa Sasaki	Yasuko Kamo	December 9, 2017
K.K.'s promise to her son that she'll attend parent's day at school get in the way when she has to go on a critical mission for Steven to take down a crime syndicate named Brigade Argento and their Blood Breed bodyguard. In order for her to handle both tasks, she gets Libra's arms dealer Patrick to hook her up with some remote firepower.
11	"Spectral Eyes, Phantom Vision, Part 1"; Transliteration: "Yougan genshikou zenpen" (Japanese: 妖眼幻視行 前編)	Kō Matsuo	Takahiro Hasui, Shintarō Itoga	Yasuko Kamo	December 16, 2017
Leonardo is shocked when his sister Michella reveals she's getting married and that she'll be coming to Hellsalem's Lot alongside her fiancee. Upon hearing this, Libra assembles in full force to protect her during her visit on the belief that her eyes are linked to Leo's. However, Leo is taken for a loop when he discovers the groom has a dangerous secret of his own; one directly connected to the All-Seeing Eyes of the Gods.
12	"Spectral Eyes, Phantom Vision, Part 2"; Transliteration: "Yougan genshikou kouhen" (Japanese: 妖眼幻視行 後編)	Masato Takayanagi	Yūji Ōya	Yasuko Kamo	December 23, 2017
With his sister being held hostage, and no backup from Libra, Leo has no choice but to follow Dr. Gamimozu's orders. Leo uses his intelligence and perseverance to distract Dr. Gamimozu until Libra arrives to save the day.
OVA	"Blood Battlefront Blockade & Beyond OVA"	Masato Takayanagi, Satomi Nakamura	Miwa Sasaki, Yūji Ōya	Yasuko Kamo	July 4, 2018
Zapp gets confronted by two dangerous sisters on a double-date gone wrong. Chain enters a drinking competition to secure a bomb so that it doesn't fall into the wrong hands.

== Home video releases ==
Toho (Japan, Region A/2)
Vol.	Episodes	Bonus disc	Release date	Ref.
1	1, 2	Textless intro, 2-pages comic	June 17, 2015	
2	3, 4		July 15, 2015	
3	5, 6		August 19, 2015	
4	7, 8		September 16, 2015	
5	9, 10		October 14, 2015	
6	11, 12	Bonus video footage	November 18, 2015	

Funimation released the complete series in blu-ray and DVD combo on August 16, 2016, in both standard and limited editions in North America.

Toho (Japan, Region A/2)
Vol.	Episodes	Bonus disc	Release date	Ref.
1	1, 2		December 13, 2017	
2	3, 4		January 17, 2018	
3	5, 6		February 14, 2018	
4	7, 8		March 14, 2018	
5	9, 10		April 18, 2018	
6	11, 12		May 23, 2018	
