= List of Daily Lives of High School Boys episodes =

Cover of the first Blu-ray and DVD volume released by Happinet in Japan on April 3, 2012.

Daily Lives of High School Boys is a 2011-12 slice of life Japanese anime series based on the manga series of the same name written and illustrated by Yasunobu Yamauchi. The story revolves around the daily lives of Tadakuni, Hidenori Tabata and Yoshitake Tanaka of Sanada North Boys High school and their various interactions with other students of and around their school and their hilarious coming of age endeavors. Each episode is divided into a series of shorts, with each short being only a few minutes in length.

The anime is produced by Sunrise and directed by Shinji Takamatsu along with character designs by Yoshinori Yumoto, editing by Emi Onodera and soundtrack music composed by Audio Highs. Eight five-minute pilot episodes were released for streaming on Niconico between November 3 and December 22, 2011, prior to the television premiere of the full-length anime which also included them. The anime premiered on TV Tokyo on January 9, 2012, followed by later airings on AT-X, Bandai Channel, TVA, TVO and online streaming on Niconico. The series was eventually picked up by Hulu for online streaming in the United States.

The series was licensed by NIS America for a home media release in North America and by Hanabee Entertainment for release in Australia. Happinet released the series in Japan on 6 Blu-ray and DVD volumes beginning on April 3, 2012.

For the anime television, the main opening theme for all episodes is "Shiny tale" by Mix Speaker's,Inc. while the ending theme is "O-hi-sama" (おひさま; lit. 'Sun') by Amesaki Annainin. "Capsule" by Mix Speaker's,Inc. is used as the insert song of episode 3.

== Episode list ==
=== Pilot episodes ===
No.	English title Japanese title	Original release date
1	"High School Boys and Literary Girl"; Transliteration: "Danshi Kōkōsei to Bungaku Shōjo" (Japanese: 男子高校生と文学少女)	November 3, 2011
2	"High School Boys and Skirts"; Transliteration: "Danshi Kōkōsei to Sukāto" (Japanese: 男子高校生とスカート)	November 10, 2011
3	"High School Boys and After School"; Transliteration: "Danshi Kōkōsei to Hōkago" (Japanese: 男子高校生と放課後)	November 17, 2011
4	"High School Boys and the Morning Journey"; Transliteration: "Danshi Kōkōsei to Tabidachi no Asa" (Japanese: 男子高校生と旅立ちの朝)	November 24, 2011
5	"High School Boys and Convex Mirror Girl"; Transliteration: "Danshi Kōkōsei to Totsumenkyō Shōjo" (Japanese: 男子高校生と凸面鏡少女)	December 1, 2011
6	"High School Boys and Friendship Power"; Transliteration: "Danshi Kōkōsei to Yūjō Pawā" (Japanese: 男子高校生と友情パワー)	December 8, 2011
7	"High School Boys and the Radio DJ"; Transliteration: "Danshi Kōkōsei to Rajio DJ" (Japanese: 男子高校生とラジオDJ)	December 15, 2011
8	"High School Boys and the Train to School"; Transliteration: "Danshi Kōkōsei to Tsūgaku Densha" (Japanese: 男子高校生と通学電車)	December 22, 2011

=== TV episodes ===
No.	Short titles (English)	Short titles (Japanese)	Original release date
1	"High School Boys and After School"	男子高校生と放課後 (danshi kōkōsei to hōkago)	January 9, 2012
1	"High School Boys and Skirts"	男子高校生とスカート (danshi kōkōsei to sukāto)	January 9, 2012
1	"High School Boys and Ghost Stories"	男子高校生と怪談 (danshi kōkōsei to kaidan)	January 9, 2012
1	"High School Boys and Female Companion"	男子高校生と同伴少女 (danshi kōkōsei to dōhan shōjo)	January 9, 2012
1	"High School Boys and Literary Girl"	男子高校生と文学少女 (danshi kōkōsei to bungaku shōjo)	January 9, 2012
2	"High School Boys and the Morning Journey"	男子高校生と旅立ちの朝 (danshi kōkōsei to tabidachi no asa)	January 16, 2012
2	"High School Boys and Convex Mirror Girl"	男子高校生と凸面鏡少女 (danshi kōkōsei to totsumenkyō shōjo)	January 16, 2012
2	"High School Boys and Friendship Power"	男子高校生と友情パワー (danshi kōkōsei to yūjō pawā)	January 16, 2012
2	"High School Boys and Literary Girl 2"	男子高校生と文学少女2 (danshi kōkōsei to bungaku shōjo 2)	January 16, 2012
2	"High School Boys and Traditional Events"	男子高校生と伝統行事 (danshi kōkōsei to dentō gyōji)	January 16, 2012
2	"High School Boys and Childhood"	男子高校生と少年時代 (danshi kōkōsei to shōnen jidai)	January 16, 2012
2	"High School Boys and Ghost Stories 2"	男子高校生と怪談2 (danshi kōkōsei to kaidan 2)	January 16, 2012
2	"The Daily Life of a Lady"	お嬢様の日常 (ojōsama no nichijō)	January 16, 2012
3	"High School Boys and Summer Plans"	男子高校生と夏計画 (danshi kōkōsei to natsu keikaku)	January 23, 2012
3	"High School Boys and the Beach House"	男子高校生と海の家 (danshi kōkōsei to umi no ie)	January 23, 2012
3	"High School Boys and Hot Spring Balls"	男子高校生と温泉卓球 (danshi kōkōsei to onsen takkyū)	January 23, 2012
3	"High School Boys and the Radio DJ"	男子高校生とラジオDJ (danshi kōkōsei to rajio DJ)	January 23, 2012
3	"High School Boys and Summer Memories"	男子高校生と夏の思い出 (danshi kōkōsei to natsu no omoide)	January 23, 2012
3	"High School Boys and the Train to School"	男子高校生と通学電車 (danshi kōkōsei to tsūgaku densha)	January 23, 2012
3	"High School Girls are Funky - Uniform and Boyfriend"	女子高生は異常 彼氏と制服 (joshikō sei wa ijō kareshi to seifuku)	January 23, 2012
4	"High School Boys and Eavesdropping"	男子高校生と立ち聞き (danshi kōkōsei to tachigiki)	January 30, 2012
4	"High School Boys and Cultural Festival 1"	男子高校生と文化祭1 (danshi kōkōsei to bunka sai 1)	January 30, 2012
4	"High School Boys and Cultural Festival 2"	男子高校生と文化祭2 (danshi kōkōsei to bunka sai 2)	January 30, 2012
4	"High School Boys and Cultural Festival 3"	男子高校生と文化祭3 (danshi kōkōsei to bunka sai 3)	January 30, 2012
4	"High School Boys and Cultural Festival 4"	男子高校生と文化祭4 (danshi kōkōsei to bunka sai 4)	January 30, 2012
4	"High School Boys and Counseling"	男子高校生と悩み相談 (danshi kōkōsei to nayami sōdan)	January 30, 2012
4	"High School Girls are Funky - Humor"	女子高生は異常 滑稽 (joshikō sei wa ijō kokkei)	January 30, 2012
5	"High School Boys and Dubbing"	男子高校生とアテレコ (danshi kōkōsei to atereko)	February 6, 2012
5	"High School Boys and Seniority"	男子高校生と年功序列 (danshi kōkōsei to nenkōjoretsu)	February 6, 2012
5	"High School Boys and the Savior"	男子高校生と救世主 (danshi kōkōsei to kyūseishu)	February 6, 2012
5	"High School Boys and Old Friends"	男子高校生と旧友 (danshi kōkōsei to kyūyū)	February 6, 2012
5	"High School Boys and the Biography of a Hero"	男子高校生と偉人伝 (danshi kōkōsei to ijin den)	February 6, 2012
5	"High School Boys and Literary Girl 3"	男子高校生と文学少女3 (danshi kōkōsei to bungaku shōjo 3)	February 6, 2012
5	"High School Girls are Funky - Resentment"	女子高生は異常 怨恨 (joshikō sei wa ijō enkon)	February 6, 2012
6	"High School Boys and the Holy Night"	男子高校生と聖なる夜 (danshi kōkōsei to seinaru yoru)	February 13, 2012
6	"High School Boys and the New Semester"	男子高校生と新学期 (danshi kōkōsei to shin gakki)	February 13, 2012
6	"High School Boys and Little Sister's Troubles"	男子高校生と妹の悩み (danshi kōkōsei to imōto no nayami)	February 13, 2012
6	"High School Boys and Ringo's Troubles"	男子高校生とりんごちゃんの悩み (danshi kōkōsei to ringo chan no nayami)	February 13, 2012
6	"High School Boys and Motoharu's Troubles"	男子高校生とモトハルの悩み (danshi kōkōsei to motoharu no nayami)	February 13, 2012
6	"High School Boys and the Sure-Kill Shot"	男子高校生と必殺シュート (danshi kōkōsei to hissatsu shūto)	February 13, 2012
6	"High School Girls are Funky - The Past"	女子高生は異常 過去 (joshikō sei wa ijō kako)	February 13, 2012
7	"High School Boys and Gags"	男子高校生と一発芸 (danshi kōkōsei to ichi hatsu gei)	February 20, 2012
7	"High School Boys and Indoor Adventures"	男子高校生と室内の冒険 (danshi kōkōsei to shitsunai no bōken)	February 20, 2012
7	"High School Boys and Indoor Adventures 2"	男子高校生と室内の冒険2 (danshi kōkōsei to shitsunai no bōken 2)	February 20, 2012
7	"High School Boys and Older Brother"	男子高校生と兄 (danshi kōkōsei to ani)	February 20, 2012
7	"High School Boys and As We Are"	男子高校生とありのままの自分 (danshi kōkōsei to arinomama no jibun)	February 20, 2012
7	"High School Boys and Careers"	男子高校生と進路 (danshi kōkōsei to shinro)	February 20, 2012
7	"High School Boys and Mitsuo"	男子高校生とミツオ君 (danshi kōkōsei to mitsuo kun)	February 20, 2012
7	"High School Boys and Mitsuo 2"	男子高校生とミツオ君2 (danshi kōkōsei to mitsuo kun 2)	February 20, 2012
7	"High School Girls are Funky - High School Girl Power"	女子高生は異常 女子高生力 (joshikō sei wa ijō joshikō sei ryoku)	February 20, 2012
8	"High School Boys and Motoharu's Sister"	男子高校生とモトハルの姉 (danshi kōkōsei to motoharu no ane)	February 27, 2012
8	"High School Boys and Mitsuo's Worries"	男子高校生とミツオ君の悩み (danshi kōkōsei to mitsuo kun no nayami)	February 27, 2012
8	"High School Boys and Manga"	男子高校生とマンガ (danshi kōkōsei to manga)	February 27, 2012
8	"High School Boys and Balconies"	男子高校生とベランダ (danshi kōkōsei to beranda)	February 27, 2012
8	"High School Boys and Convenience Stores"	男子高校生とコンビニ (danshi kōkōsei to konbini)	February 27, 2012
8	"High School Boys and Towers"	男子高校生と塔 (danshi kōkōsei to tō)	February 27, 2012
8	"High School Boys and Cakes"	男子高校生とケーキ (danshi kōkōsei to kēki)	February 27, 2012
8	"High School Boys and Horoscopes"	男子高校生と占い (danshi kōkōsei to uranai)	February 27, 2012
8	"High School Boys and 100"	男子高校生と100 (danshi kōkōsei to 100)	February 27, 2012
8	"High School Girls are Funky - Ramen"	女子高生は異常 ラーメン (joshikō sei wa ijō rāmen)	February 27, 2012
8	"High School Girls are Funky - Skirts"	女子高生は異常 スカート (joshikō sei wa ijō sukāto)	February 27, 2012
9	"High School Boys and Older Brothers and Sisters"	男子高校生と兄と姉 (danshi kōkōsei to ani to ane)	March 5, 2012
9	"High School Boys and Drop-Kicks"	男子高校生とドロップキック (danshi kōkōsei to doroppu kikku)	March 5, 2012
9	"High School Boys and the End of Summer"	男子高校生と夏の終わり (danshi kōkōsei to natsu no owari)	March 5, 2012
9	"High School Boys and Glasses"	男子高校生とメガネ (danshi kōkōsei to megane)	March 5, 2012
9	"High School Boys and the Daily Lives of the Student Council"	男子高校生と生徒会の日常 (danshi kōkōsei to seito kai no nichijō)	March 5, 2012
9	"High School Boys and Panties"	男子高校生とパンツ (danshi kōkōsei to pantsu)	March 5, 2012
9	"High School Boys and Wiring"	男子高校生と配線 (danshi kōkōsei to haisen)	March 5, 2012
9	"High School Girls are Funky - Archdemon"	女子高生は異常 アークデーモン (joshikō sei wa ijō āku dēmon)	March 5, 2012
10	"High School Boys and Limits"	男子高校生と限界 (danshi kōkōsei to genkai)	March 12, 2012
10	"High School Boys and Consequences"	男子高校生と結果 (danshi kōkōsei to kekka)	March 12, 2012
10	"High School Boys and Winter"	男子高校生と冬 (danshi kōkōsei to fuyu)	March 12, 2012
10	"High School Boys and Run"	男子高校生と走る (danshi kōkōsei to hashiru)	March 12, 2012
10	"High School Boys and Mochi Soup"	男子高校生と雑煮 (danshi kōkōsei to zōni)	March 12, 2012
10	"High School Boys and Ground"	男子高校生と地面 (danshi kōkōsei to jimen)	March 12, 2012
10	"High School Boys and Bikes"	男子高校生と自転車 (danshi kōkōsei to jitensha)	March 12, 2012
10	"High School Boys and Cooking"	男子高校生と料理 (danshi kōkōsei to ryōri)	March 12, 2012
10	"High School Boys and Schools"	男子高校生と学校 (danshi kōkōsei to gakkō)	March 12, 2012
10	"High School Girls are Funky - Women Who Left a Scar"	女子高生は異常 傷痕をつけた女達 (joshikō sei wa ijō kizuato o tsuke ta onna tachi)	March 12, 2012
11	"High School Boys and Fathers"	男子高校生と父 (danshi kōkōsei to chichi)	March 19, 2012
11	"High School Boys and Literary Girl 4"	男子高校生と文学少女4 (danshi kōkōsei to bungaku shōjo 4)	March 19, 2012
11	"High School Boys and Conflict"	男子高校生と闘争 (danshi kōkōsei to tōsō)	March 19, 2012
11	"High School Boys and Kick the Can"	男子高校生と缶ケリ (danshi kōkōsei to kan keri)	March 19, 2012
11	"High School Boys and Chitchat"	男子高校生と雑談 (danshi kōkōsei to zatsudan)	March 19, 2012
11	"High School Boys and Love Letters"	男子高校生とラブレター (danshi kōkōsei to raburetā)	March 19, 2012
11	"High School Boys and Distance"	男子高校生と間合い (danshi kōkōsei to maai)	March 19, 2012
11	"High School Boys and Annoyance"	男子高校生とイラ (danshi kōkōsei to ira)	March 19, 2012
11	"High School Girls are Funky - Conflict"	女子高生は異常 闘争 (joshikō sei wa ijō tōsō)	March 19, 2012
12	"High School Girls are Funky - Demons"	女子高生は異常 悪魔 (joshikō sei wa ijō akuma)	March 26, 2012
12	"High School Boys and Lies"	男子高校生と嘘 (danshi kōkōsei to uso)	March 26, 2012
12	"High School Boys and UFO Catchers"	男子高校生とUFO (danshi kōkōsei to UFO)	March 26, 2012
12	"High School Boys and Store Employees"	男子高校生と店員 (danshi kōkōsei to tenin)	March 26, 2012
12	"High School Boys and Assertiveness"	男子高校生と積極性 (danshi kōkōsei to sekkyoku sei)	March 26, 2012
12	"High School Boys and Getting Hit On"	男子高校生と絡まれ (danshi kōkōsei to karamare)	March 26, 2012
12	"High School Boys and Frankfurter"	男子高校生とフランクフルト (danshi kōkōsei to furankufuruto)	March 26, 2012
12	"High School Boys and ..."	男子高校生と… (danshi kōkōsei to ...)	March 26, 2012
12	"High School Girls are Funky: The Movie - Archdemon vs. Silver Devil!"	映画女子高生は異常 アークデーモンvsシルバーデビル 祝♥卒業!! (eiga joshikō sei wa ijō āku dēmon vs shirubā de biru shuku sotsugyō !!)	March 26, 2012

== Home media ==
Happinet released the series in Japan on 6 Blu-ray and DVD volumes between April 3 and September 4, 2012. NIS America released the complete series in a 2-disc Blu-ray set with English subtitles on August 6, 2013. Hanabee Entertainment released the complete series on a single DVD volume in Australia on July 31, 2013.

Happinet (Japan)
Vol.	Episodes	Bonus disc	Release date	Ref.
1	1, 2	Special CD	April 3, 2012	
2	3, 4	Special CD	May 2, 2012	
3	5, 6	Special CD	June 2, 2012	
4	7, 8	Special CD	July 3, 2012	
5	9, 10	Special CD	August 2, 2012	
6	11, 12	Special CD	September 4, 2012	
