= List of Descending Stories: Showa Genroku Rakugo Shinju episodes =

Cover of the first home video release volume.

Descending Stories: Showa Genroku Rakugo Shinju is a Japanese anime television series based on the manga of the same name written and illustrated by Haruko Kumota. The anime series was produced by Studio Deen and directed by Mamoru Hatakeyama, with series composition handled by Jun Kumagai, character designs by Mieko Hosoi and music by Kana Shibue. Prior to the anime series, a two-episode original anime DVD series, titled Yotarō-hen Zenko-pen (与太郎放浪篇・前後編; lit. "Yotarō Arc Part I and II"), was bundled with the seventh and eighth volumes of the manga, which was released on 6 March 2015 and 7 August 2015, respectively.

The first season began airing on 9 January 2016 with an extended 48-minute first episode, and ended on 2 April 2016 with a total of 13 episodes. The opening theme for the first season, titled "Usurai Shinjū" (薄ら氷心中; lit. "Thin-ice Double Suicide"), was composed by Sheena Ringo and performed by Megumi Hayashibara. It was simulcasted by Crunchyroll in their "Winter 2016" lineup.

The second season, announced at the end of the first season's thirteenth and final episode, began airing on 7 January 2017 and ended on 25 March 2017 with a total of 12 episodes. The staff and cast from the first season reprised their roles in the sequel anime series. The opening theme for the second season, titled "Imawa no Shinigami" (今際の死神; lit. "The Death in His Dying Moment"), was also composed by Ringo and performed by Hayashibara. Like the first season, Crunchyroll simulcasted the second season in their "Winter 2017" lineup.

== Episodes ==
=== Season 1 ===
No. overall	No. in season	Title	Original release date
1	1	"Episode 1"; Transliteration: "Dai-ichi wa" (Japanese: 第一話)	9 January 2016
A young man, Kyoji, is released from prison and wants to become the apprentice of the famous rakugo performer Yurakutei Yakumo. Yakumo decides to take him home and gives him the name Yotarō (fool). Yakumo introduces him to Konatsu, the daughter of former Master Yurakutei Sukeroku. Kyoji catches Konatsu practicing her father’s routines in the early morning and convinces her to ask Yakumo to teach her too. When she does, Yakumo refuses and ridicules her father's material which is in a different style. She angrily accuses him of her father's death. Kyoji's old gang boss turns up and tries to get him to do a job, but Yakumo intervenes, and invites the former boss to Kyoji’s his first rakugo performance. Kyoji is a success, and his boss leaves saying he has no further business with him. On the way home Yakumo criticises Konatsu for teaching Kyoji. At the next performance Kyoji goes first, using Yurakutei's style, but he is so exhausted that during Yakumo's performance he falls asleep and starts snoring. After the performance Yakumo expels him, but later Kyoji apologises profusely and Yakumo agrees to let him return on 3 conditions.
2	2	"Episode 2"; Transliteration: "Dai-ni wa" (Japanese: 第二話)	16 January 2016
In the 1930s, a geisha takes Bon, her young lame son who can no longer dance, to rakugo master Yurakutei Yakumo to be apprenticed, but is interrupted by Shin who also wants to become Yakumo (八雲) and perform rakugo as well. The master is impressed by Shin's brazen attitude, and takes him in, as well as a counter to Bon's stiff manner. The master gives them the names Hatsutaro (Shin) and Kikuhiko (Bon). The two boys are totally different in character—Shin is outgoing and dedicated completely to rakugo while Bon is shy and introverted, and does not think rakugo is for him. After undergoing training, at Kikuhiko's first performance, the audience is bored because of his dry recitation while Shin successfully entertains the audience with his animated style.
3	3	"Episode 3"; Transliteration: "Dai-san wa" (Japanese: 第三話)	23 January 2016
In 1941, Kikuhiko studies rakugo at night under Yakumo and goes to school during the day, but becomes dejected as Shin progresses faster than he does as he already left school. Bon loves the theatre and one night meets Ochiyo, a shamisen student who becomes his girlfriend, but later she has to return to the country. Rakugo has begun losing popularity because of its erotic and bawdy tales, and the practitioners have begun self-censorship. As the war progresses, Yakumo decides to take Shin with him to entertain troops, but sends Kikuhiko to the country with his wife. Time passes and after a year, they no longer hear from the master. However, Kikuhiko recites rakugo stories to himself. After the war, Kikuhiko and the master's wife returned to Tokyo and he begins to work as a futatsume (二ツ目, the middle rank of rakugo) performer at dinners. Suddenly Yakumo and Shin return home unannounced. When rakugo becomes in demand again, Kikuhiko and Shin strike out on their own. One day a woman named Miyokichi arrives at Yakumo's home.
4	4	"Episode 4"; Transliteration: "Dai-yon wa" (Japanese: 第四話)	30 January 2016
Kikuhiko is busy working and falls behind in his practice, but Shin gets more work as a futatsume, and takes the name Sukeroku (助六). Kikuhiko tries to improve his ability, but lacks the recklessness of Shin and his master Yakumo tells him he must find his own style. At a theatre performance, Yakumo meets Shin and Kikuhiko, and introduces Miyokichi to them, the geisha who is with him. Miyokichi invites Kikuhiko to visit her, and when he does, she tries to seduce him.
5	5	"Episode 5"; Transliteration: "Dai-go wa" (Japanese: 第五話)	6 February 2016
Kikuhiko and Shin are still sharing Kikuhiko's accommodation, and Shin still spends all his earnings on having a good time. However, Kikuhiko is jealous that Shin gets so much rakugo work. Miyokichi runs into Kikuhiko, comforts him and offers to help him to prepare for his role in a play the next day. Kikuhiko is to play a woman in full make-up and kimono. He is extremely nervous, but carries off the role superbly and the show is a great success.
6	6	"Episode 6"; Transliteration: "Dai-roku wa" (Japanese: 第六話)	13 February 2016
Following the successful performance Shin tells Kikuhiko why he performs and loves rakugo, but Kikuhiko still has doubts about performing. He recalls his time growing up as a boy in a geisha house and how he was apprenticed out to Yakumo, but was never really drawn to rakugo. At the monthly futatsume meet, Kikuhiko performs "Shinagawa Shinju", and realises that if he performs for himself, the audience will appreciate the performance as well.
7	7	"Episode 7"; Transliteration: "Dai-nana wa" (Japanese: 第七話)	20 February 2016
Kikuhiko and Shin both become successful, but with quite different rakugo styles. Shin continues his good time lifestyle while Kikuhiko does the opposite, preferring a quiet evening with Miyokichi. Yakumo asks Kikuhiko to accompany him on a tour, rather than Shin. Kikuhiko spends little time with Miyokichi, preferring to practice which make her quite sad as she enjoys his company and has fallen in love with him.
8	8	"Episode 8"; Transliteration: "Dai-hachi wa" (Japanese: 第八話)	27 February 2016
The rakugo tour goes well, and Kikuhiko proves very popular, and may soon rise to the level of shin'uchi (真打ち, star performer). Kikuhiko is also keen to reach that level, but Yakumo reminds him of Shin’s situation and his disfavour with the elders because of his irreverent behaviour despite his popularity with audiences. Shin and Miyokichi both miss Kikuhiko, but in different ways, and just as Shin consoles her, Kikuhiko arrives back and misinterprets their embrace. He is cold toward her, and Miyokichi runs off heartbroken. Kikuhiko is not jealous however, and even though he tells Shin that he loves her, he wants to break it off anyway, preferring to pursue a respectable career and be alone. Kikuhiko and Shin agree to part ways and Shin tells him of the first Sukeroku who taught him and gave him his fan which he passes to Kikuhiko. Yakumo successfully argues for both Kikuhiko and Shin to become shin'uchi.
9	9	"Episode 9"; Transliteration: "Dai-kyū wa" (Japanese: 第九話)	5 March 2016
Kikuhiko and Shin attend the shin'uchi ceremony and Shin successfully performs the rakugo that is the president's speciality. Kikuhiko goes to say farewell to Miyokichi who is distraught and has become suicidal. Meanwhile Yakumo berates Shin for performing the president's speciality, and they argue about the future of rakugo, maintaining the tradition versus changing with the times. Yakumo decides to give his name to Kikuhiko—Shin become angry and is expelled. Later that night he encounters Miyokichi and they console each other. Yakumo offers his family name to Kikuhiko who rejects the offer, saying it should go to Sukeroku (Shin) because he is a better performer. Meanwhile Shin and Miyokichi are living together and she is pregnant. Shin goes to say goodbye to Kikuhiko as he and Miyokichi plan to move to the country, financed by money Miyokichi stole from the geisha house.
10	10	"Episode 10"; Transliteration: "Dai-jū wa" (Japanese: 第十話)	12 March 2016
Five years later, a young man begs Kikuhiko to take him as an apprentice but he refuses. Yakumo performs his speciality, "Kowakare", but at the end of the performance he collapses. As he is dying, he tells Kikuhiko of his life and how his father took an apprentice who was better at rakugo than him, but he forced his father to declare him as his heir. The other student, named Sukeroku disappeared. His style was the similar to Shin's which is why he was so hard on Shin. After Yakumo's funeral, Kikuhiko surprisingly tells a story of a shinagumi, and again comes under pressure from the association president to take the Yakumo name. He goes to the countryside to find Shin and Miyokichi. He finds a soba restaurant with a young girl performing rakugo. Her name is Konatsu.
11	11	"Episode 11"; Transliteration: "Dai-jū Ichi wa" (Japanese: 第十一話)	19 March 2016
Kikuhiko befriends Konatsu who tells him about her rakugo father who refuses to perform, and her mother who abandoned them. Konatsu takes Kikuhiko to meet her father and Kikuhiko and Shin are reunited. Kikuhiko asks Shin to return to Tokyo with him and perform rakugo but he refuses. Kikuhiko stays in the village and tries to convince Shin perform again. He spends more time with Konatsu when he starts a rakugo, Shin joins in and they do the story as a duet. They agree to perform together and Miyokichi learns about it.
12	12	"Episode 12"; Transliteration: "Dai-jū Ni wa" (Japanese: 第十二話)	26 March 2016
On the day of the performance of Kikuhiko and Sukeroku, Shin is nervous but Matsuda arrives which cheers him up. Shin’s "Shibahama" performance goes well, and Sukeroku entertains the crowd. Again, Kikuhiko asks Shin and Konatsu to return to Tokyo with him. Miyokichi finds Kikuhiko later, at his inn and declares her love for him, but Shin arrives and offers to quit rakugo if she will stay with him. Miyokichi leans against the old balcony railing which collapses and she falls. Shin grabs her but also falls over the balcony. They are both caught by Kikuhiko, but he cannot pull them up. Shin lets go and he and Miyokichi fall to their deaths.
13	13	"Episode 13"; Transliteration: "Dai-jū San wa" (Japanese: 第十三話)	2 April 2016
Kikuhiko and Matsuda inter the ashes of Shin and Miyokichi. Kikuhiko takes Konatsu to Tokyo with him even though she doesn't want to go. The association president again asks Kikuhiko to take the name Yakumo and this time he accepts. Konatsu stays with him, but is defiant and will not accept his authority. Years later the ex-criminal Yurakutei Yotarō finally becomes a shin'uchi. After his performance, he goes to see Yurakutei Yakumo, but he is not there, and he meets Konatsu who asks him to recite the "Nozarashi" rakugo. She tells him that she is expecting a child and has temporarily returned to the house. She will not reveal the father's identity, but Yotarō offers to be the father. At the Yurakutei family grave, Yurakutei Yakumo tells Matsuda that he's been asked to be the Rakugo Association president. Yotarō arrives at the graves to pay his respects, and asks if he can take the name Sukeroku.

=== Season 2 ===
No. overall	No. in season	Title	Original release date
14	1	"Episode 1"; Transliteration: "Dai-ichi wa" (Japanese: 第一話)	7 January 2017
A year later, Yotarō recaps the first series as a rakugo and the 3 conditions Yakumo took him on as an apprentice 10 years earlier: 1. To memorize all of Sukeroku and Yakumo’s rakugo, 2. To open a path for rakugo’s revival and 3. Not to die before Yurakutei Yakumo. At the shin'uchi celebration, a former student, Tsuburaya Mangetsu arrives and pays his respects, although he says that rakugo is dying out. Yurakutei Yakumo and Yurakutei Sukeroku gives their performances. Later Yotarō again proposes to Konatsu who has had her baby but she refuses him. A man whom Yakumo rejected as an apprentice and who saw Sukeroku perform approaches Yotarō, compliments him on his performance and offers to sponsor him. He is Higuchi Eisuke, who is now a popular writer and he proposes to write new rakugo for Yotarō to perform to keep it new and break from old traditions. Yotarō agrees to ask Yakumo's permission. When he asks Yakumo, Yakumo says it’s up to Yotarō to decide, but says that he would prefer rakugo to die with him rather than be corrupted.
15	2	"Episode 2"; Transliteration: "Dai-ni wa" (Japanese: 第二話)	14 January 2017
Yotarō has moved back to live with Yakumo and Konatsu and a TV news item is broadcast about Yotarō's criminal past with the Yoshikiri gang. Then, after an altercation in the audience of Yotarō's performance his TV performance contract is terminated. He continues to practice, but Yakumo becomes impatient with him. Yakumo and Konatsu find they share a common bond through rakugo and her father Sukeroku although she still blames him for her parents' death. One of the futatsume teases Yotarō about not having his own style, so at his next performance he bares his back showing his Yakuza tattoo, but fails to impress the audience. Later that night Higuchi and Yotarō meet Yakumo at a geisha house and Yakumo tells Yotarō to embrace and accept his past rather than deny it.
16	3	"Episode 3"; Transliteration: "Dai-san wa" (Japanese: 第三話)	21 January 2017
Higuchi works with Yotarō to analyse rakugo stories, and Yotarō says he doesn't try to understand the stories, but has a good ability to memorise anything he hears. Yotarō and Konatsu are now married, but Yotarō still calls her sister. She tells the mistress of the geisha house that she wants to quit working at the restaurant soon. The geisha mistress is told a detective is at her restaurant while Yotarō's former yakuza boss was meeting the Mukudori gang but she manages to avoid a scene. Yotarō bursts in to talk to the big boss and reminds him that he went to prison in place of his boss to but feels that he was unfairly treated, but the boss reminds him that he was allowed to leave the gang and become a rakugo. Yotarō recites a rakugo rant abusing the boss, then demands that the boss make no claim on Konatsu's son. Yotarō and Konatsu talk, and she expresses gratitude for his help. Later, in discussion with Yakumo, Yotarō says his passion for rakugo is based on the characters within the stories. Yakumo agrees to do a family performance for Yotarō if he learns "Inokori", a little performed rakugo. Yakumo then performs the rakugo for Yotarō in the manner of Sukeroku.
17	4	"Episode 4"; Transliteration: "Dai-yon wa" (Japanese: 第四話)	28 January 2017
Yotarō becomes successful as Sukeroku on TV and playing to packed theaters while Konatsu assists with musical accompaniment. Their son Shin is also immersed in the world of rakugo. Higuchi tries to get Yakumo to read some new rakugo that he has written but Yakumo tears them up, saying rakugo is dead and no longer relevant. Yotarō and Konatsu agree to perform a rakugo at Shin's school, but Yotarō tricks Konatsu into performing "Jugemu" (寿限無) which she does to great applause. Yotarō tries to get Konatsu to perform again, but she refuses.
18	5	"Episode 5"; Transliteration: "Dai-go wa" (Japanese: 第五話)	4 February 2017
Yakumo tells Yotarō that they have been invited to a family performance at the Kabuki-za in two months time. Meanwhile Yotarō listens to tapes of Sukeroku’s performances and search for his own style. Higuchi gives Yotarō copies of different versions of Inokori to study and bring out his own Inokori Saheiji. On the day of the performance Yakumo berates Yotarō for spending time in the red light district, until Yotarō explains that he completed the tattoo that covers his back. At the performance, after Yotarō Yakumo performs Hangan-ko, with Konatsu accompanying on Koto. During the performance he sees a vision of Miyokichi and collapses at the end of the performance. Yakumo sees himself in a room filled with candles, and sees Sukeroku who says nothing, but then tries to strangle him.
19	6	"Episode 6"; Transliteration: "Dai-roku wa" (Japanese: 第六話)	11 February 2017
Yakumo remains unconsciousness after collapsing at the end of his performance and Konatsu accompanies him to the hospital while Yotarō performs Inokori to the audience who is unaware of what happened. Later, he owner of the theater tells Yotarō that there is talk about rebuilding the theater but there is no money so he intends to keep it going at it is. Same days later Yakumo awakes and realizes that he is still alive after all.
20	7	"Episode 7"; Transliteration: "Dai-nana wa" (Japanese: 第七話)	18 February 2017
As Yakumo slowly recovers, he confides in Konatsu that he considers stopping rakugo. Yotarō and Higuchi go to see some films of rakugo performances made many years ago when Yurakutei Kikuhiko and then Yurakutei Sukeroku were young. Yotarō gains a greater understanding of their motivations and learns the truth about the deaths of Sukeroku and Miyokichi from Matsuda.
21	8	"Episode 8"; Transliteration: "Dai-hachi wa" (Japanese: 第八話)	25 February 2017
At an East-West Rakugo Event, Mangetsu explains some of the rakugo tradition. As Yakumo slowly recovers he tells Shin about his grandfather Sukeroku. Eisuke Higuchi arrives with memorabilia of rakugo, including photos taken during the war. He also reveal that he has been secretly recording Yakumo's performances. That night, Yotarō and Konatsu find Yakumo on a bridge, and he tells them how terrible it is to not be able to perform at his best. On the pretext of a night out, Matsuda drives Yakumo to Yanashima Theater where a group of 20 of Yakumo's closest friends await him and Yotarō pleads with him to perform. First, Yotarō performs an emotional rakugo that he learned from a recording of Sukeroku. Then, just when Yakumo is about to start, the police burst in and arrest his old friend, the head of the Yoshikiri gang.
22	9	"Episode 9"; Transliteration: "Dai-kyū wa" (Japanese: 第九話)	4 March 2017
The head of the Yoshikiri gang is sentenced to six years in Suzugamori Prison and Yotarō drinks with the melancholy gang. On a visit to a bathhouse Yotarō convinces Yakumo to perform rakugo in the prison and Yakumo gives a heartfelt and moving performance. Later, Yakumo goes to see Yotarō performing Inokori but leaves before the end, calling it "disagreeable". Yakumo waits until the theater is closed and then performs the rakugo Shinigami to the rows of empty seats. At the end of the performance he collapses and knocks over a candle, then sees Sukeroku as a shinigami. Yakumo is about to surrender to death when Yotarō arrives and Yakumo decides he doesn't want to die just yet. Yotarō carries him from the burning building.
23	10	"Episode 10"; Transliteration: "Dai-jū wa" (Japanese: 第十話)	11 March 2017
With the theater burned out and Yakumo in hospital, everyone is sad, but the owner is philosophical about continuing rakugo in some way. As spring approaches, Konatsu thrills Yotarō when she tells him that she is pregnant with his child. Yotarō continues performing rakugo on radio, and asks Eisuke Higuchi about his new stories, but he wants one that could be told by a woman. Yotarō decides not to perform any of them while Yakumo is alive. Meanwhile, Yakumo and Konatsu share some quiet and tender moments together at home. While there, they listen to Yotarō performing “Nozarashi” on the radio. Konatsu asks Yakumo if he will take her as an apprentice, and he happily agrees. Yakumo then suddenly wakes up in the spirit world, where he meets Sukeroku, and Sukeroku announces he is dead.
24	11	"Episode 11"; Transliteration: "Dai-jū Ichi wa" (Japanese: 第十一話)	18 March 2017
In the spirit world, Yakumo sees Sukeroku who asks him for money to move on to the afterlife. For a while they become young boys and then young men as they discuss the past. They also encounter Miyokichi who shares her thoughts with Yakumo. The three go to the rakugo theatre which recently burned down, now featuring previous generations of performers. Sukeroku performs a rakugo based on the expression, "Fires are the Edo city flower". Then Yakumo begins the rakugo "Jugemu", with Sukeroku, Miyokichi, Konatsu and Shinnosuke in the audience. At the end, Sukeroku farewells Yakumo across the Sanzu River and he crosses the river, he is surprised to find that the ferryman is Matsuda. At peace, he recites a poem as he drifts into the afterlife.
25	12	"Episode 12"; Transliteration: "Dai-jū Ni wa" (Japanese: 第十二話)	25 March 2017
Sixteen years after Yakumo's death, Shinnosuke is training to become a shin'uchi, his younger sister Koyuki begins high school, and Konatsu has established herself as the first ever female shin'uchi. Wondering who Shinnosuke's biological father is, Higuchi asks Konatsu if Shinnosuke has blood ties from both the second generation Sukeroku and the eight generation Yakumo, Konatsu proceeds to neither confirm or deny that accusation. The theater that was burned down is rebuilt, and Yotaro, now known as the ninth generation Yakumo, performs along with other students, friends, and family to celebrate the grand reopening of the theater. In Yotaro's performance, he acted as if he was going to collapse in order to surprise the audience. After the show, Yotaro reflects on his journey.
