= Hisako Kanemoto =

Japanese voice actress

- 金元 寿子
- Born: Kurashiki, Okayama Prefecture, Japan
- Other name: Juri Aikawa
- Occupations: Voice actress; singer
- Years active: 2009–present
- Employer: Production Baobab
- Notable work: Children Who Chase Lost Voices as Asuna Watase; Gargantia on the Verdurous Planet as Amy; Squid Girl as Squid Girl; Sailor Moon Crystal as Sailor Mercury; Mobile Suit Gundam: Iron-Blooded Orphans as Atra Mixta; Smile PreCure! as Yayoi Kise/Cure Peace; Gamers! as Karen Tendo; The Ryuo's Work Is Never Done! as Ginko Sora; Food Wars!: Shokugeki no Soma as Erina Nakiri; Mewkledreamy as Su; BanG Dream! as Tsugumi Hazawa; Bottom-tier Character Tomozaki as Aoi Hinami; Mushoku Tensei as Zenith Greyrat; The Eminence in Shadow as Epsilon
- Height: 157 cm (5 ft 2 in)
- Musical career
- Genre: J-pop
- Instrument: Vocals
- Years active: 2014–present
- Label: Victor Entertainment

Hisako Kanemoto (金元 寿子, Kanemoto Hisako), also known professionally as Juri Aikawa (相川 寿里, Aikawa Juri), is a Japanese voice actress and singer. She is represented by Production Baobab.

== Biography ==
Kanemoto attended high school in Kamogata, Okayama and enrolled in the voice acting course at the vocational school of Art College in Kobe. She starred in her anime debut Sora no Manimani with her stage name Juri Aikawa, after being selected to play Shirley by an audience vote at the DreamParty Tokyo convention. She currently uses her real name in 2010. She had a leading role in the anime series Sound of the Sky and in Makoto Shinkai's anime film Children Who Chase Lost Voices. She won the "Best Rookie Actress" award at the 5th Seiyu Awards. Her album, Fantastic Voyage was released in 2014.

== Filmography ==
=== Anime series ===
Year	Title	Role	Notes
2009	Sora no Manimani	Miku Edogawa	
2010	Durarara!!	Kururi Orihara	
2010	Jewelpet Twinkle	Judy	
2010	Lilpri	Ayaka, Ukita	
2010	Night Raid 1931	Natsume Kagiya's sister	
2010	Okami-san and Her Seven Companions	Uika	
2010	Sekirei ~Pure Engagement~	Katsuragi	
2010	Shiki	Shihori Maeda	
2010	Sound of the Sky	Kanata Sorami	
2010	Squid Girl	Squid Girl	
2011	47 Todoufuken	Okayama-ken	
2011	Aria the Scarlet Ammo	Misaki Nakasorachi	
2011	Battle Spirits Brave	Alice	
2011	B Gata H Kei	Additional Voices	
2011	Bleach	Nozomi Kujo	
2011	Cooking Idol I! My! Mine!	Papaya	
2011	The Everyday Tales of a Cat God	Mike	
2011	Hanasaku Iroha	Tachibana's Daughter	
2011	Is This a Zombie?	Mael Strom/Yuki "Tomonori" Yoshida	
2012	Bodacious Space Pirates	Grunhilde Serenity	
2012	The Familiar of Zero	Luctiana	
2012	Girls und Panzer	Katyusha	
2012	Humanity Has Declined	Fairy, Curly	
2012	Joshiraku	Ma-chan	
2012	Kokoro Connect	Yui Kiriyama	
2012	Lagrange: The Flower of Rin-ne	Asteria Lizamarie de Roschefall	
2012	Maji de Otaku na English! Ribbon-chan: Eigo de Tatakau Mahou Shoujo	Bell	
2012	Muv-Luv Alternative: Total Eclipse	Izumi Noto	
2012	Say I Love You	Chiharu Ogawa	
2012	Smile PreCure!	Yayoi Kise / Cure Peace, Miracle Peace, Bad End Peace	
2013	A Certain Scientific Railgun S	Kanmi Eiga	
2013	AKB0048	Mei	
2013	Gargantia on the Verdurous Planet	Amy	
2013	Gingitsune	Makoto Saeki	
2013	Kotoura-san	Kotoura Haruka	
2013	Maji de Otaku na English! Ribbon-chan the TV	Bell	
2013	Oreshura	Himeka Akishino	
2013	Photo Kano	Mai Sakura	
2013	Wanna Be the Strongest in the World!	Moe Fukuoka	
2013	Strike the Blood	Natsuki Minamiya	
2013	Tokyo Ravens	Hokuto, Takiko Souma	
2014	Girl Friend Beta	Kise Yukawa	
2014	Gugure! Kokkuri-san	Jimeko-chan	
2014	The Kawai Complex Guide to Manors and Hostel Behavior	Sayaka Watanabe	
2014	The Kindaichi Case Files R	Akiko Hama	
2014	Knights of Sidonia	Yuhata Midorikawa	
2014	Recently, My Sister Is Unusual	Yukina Kiritani	
2014	Riddle Story of Devil	Haru Ichinose	
2014	The Seven Deadly Sins	Veronica Liones	
2014	Z/X Ignition	Sera Kurashiki	
2015	Assassination Classroom	Hinano Kurahashi	
2015	Chivalry of a Failed Knight	Tōka Tōdō	
2015	Gate	Tuka Luna Marceau	
2015	Gunslinger Stratos: The Animation	Kyōka Katagiri	
2015	Heavy Object	Ohoho	
2015	Knights of Sidonia: War of the Ninth Planet	Yuhata Midorikawa	
2015	Maria the Virgin Witch	Maria	
2015	Mobile Suit Gundam: Iron-Blooded Orphans	Atra Mixta	
2015	Ninja Slayer From Animation	Asari	
2015	Rokka: Braves of the Six Flowers	Rolonia Manchetta	
2015	Shirobako	Kyoko Suzuki, Aria Hitotose	
2015	Star-Myu	Tsumugi Nayuki	
2015	Unlimited Fafnir	Lisa Highwalker	
2015	Valkyrie Drive: Mermaid	Ange	
2016	Alderamin on the Sky	Miara Gin	
2016	And You Thought There Is Never a Girl Online?	Isana	
2016	B-Project: Kodou*Ambitious	Tsubasa Sumisora	
2016	The Disastrous Life of Saiki K.	Female cat Pussy / Pushi	
2016	Love Live! Sunshine!!	Itsuki	
2016	Regalia: The Three Sacred Stars	Retsu	
2016	Re:Zero	Petelgeuse's Finger (Woman 2)	
2016	Pretty Guardian Sailor Moon Crystal Season III	Ami Mizuno/Sailor Mercury	Death Busters arc
2016	Lostorage incited WIXOSS	Mel	
2016	Tsukiuta. The Animation	Kurisu Hijiri	
2017	A Sister's All You Need	Nayuta Kani	
2017	Blood Blockade Battlefront & Beyond	Caroline Foster	
2017	Children of the Whales	Sami	
2017	Classroom of the Elite	Chie Hoshinomiya	
2017	Food Wars! Shokugeki no Soma: The Third Plate	Erina Nakiri	
2017	Gamers!	Karen Tendo	
2017	Granblue Fantasy: The Animation	Djeeta	
2017	Hell Girl: Fourth Twilight	Shizuka Mayama	
2017	ID-0	Clair Hojo	
2017	Inuyashiki	Fumino Inoue	
2017	Magical Circle Guru Guru	Churika	
2017	Rage of Bahamut: Virgin Soul	Ridwan	
2017	Re:Creators	Ayano Kōura/Marine	
2018	The Ancient Magus' Bride	Ethan Barklem	
2018	BanG Dream! Girls Band Party! Pico	Tsugumi Hazawa	
2018	Citrus	Sara Tachibana	
2018	Food Wars! Shokugeki no Soma: The Third Plate – Tootsuki Ressha-hen	Erina Nakiri	
2018	A Place Further than the Universe	Megumi Takahashi	
2018	The Ryuo's Work Is Never Done!	Ginko Sora	
2018	Senran Kagura Shinovi Master	Murakumo	
2019	BanG Dream! 2nd Season	Tsugumi Hazawa	
2019	Dr. Stone	Connie Lee	
2019	Fire Force	Asako Hague	
2019	Food Wars! Shokugeki no Soma: The Fourth Plate	Erina Nakiri	
2019	High School Prodigies Have It Easy Even In Another World	Keine Kanzaki	
2019	Kandagawa Jet Girls	Fumika Shinshijuin	
2020	BanG Dream! 3rd Season	Tsugumi Hazawa	
2020	BanG Dream! Girls Band Party! Pico: Ohmori	Tsugumi Hazawa	
2020	Food Wars! Shokugeki no Soma: The Fifth Plate	Erina Nakiri	
2020	Gleipnir	Miku Aihara	
2020	Mewkledreamy	Su	
2020	Monster Girl Doctor	Dione Nephilim	
2020	Mr Love: Queen's Choice	MC/Watashi	
2021	BanG Dream! Girls Band Party! Pico Fever!	Tsugumi Hazawa	
2021	Bottom-tier Character Tomozaki	Aoi Hinami	
2021	Higehiro	Airi Gotō	
2021	Horimiya	Motoko Iura	
2021	How a Realist Hero Rebuilt the Kingdom	Maria Euphoria	
2021	Mushoku Tensei	Zenith Greyrat	
2021	Vivy: Fluorite Eye's Song	Margaret	
2022	The Demon Girl Next Door Season 2	Sakura Chiyoda	
2022	The Eminence in Shadow	Epsilon	
2022	The Executioner and Her Way of Life	Momo	
2022	Fantasia Sango - Realm of Legends	Shōrei	
2022	Hairpin Double	Blue/Kyōko Usui	
2022	Love After World Domination	Kyōko Kuroyuri	
2022	Love Flops	Bai Mongfa	
2022	Miss Shachiku and the Little Baby Ghost	Fushihara-san	
2022	Uncle from Another World	Sawae	
2023	Ao no Orchestra	Takami Kimura	
2023	The Eminence in Shadow 2nd Season	Epsilon	
2023	Horimiya: The Missing Pieces	Motoko Iura	
2023	Onimai: I'm Now Your Sister!	Kaede Hozuki	
2023	Revenger	Nio	
2024	Bottom-tier Character Tomozaki 2nd Stage	Aoi Hinami	
2024	Demon Lord 2099	Trat Getel	
2024	Goodbye, Dragon Life	Myraal	
2024	That Time I Got Reincarnated as a Slime	Elmesia	
2025	Backstabbed in a Backwater Dungeon	IceHeat	
2025	Can a Boy-Girl Friendship Survive?	Sakura Natsume	
2025	I Left My A-Rank Party to Help My Former Students Reach the Dungeon Depths!	Mamal	
2025	Milky Subway: The Galactic Limited Express	Akane Daidoji	
2025	New Saga	Seraia	
2025	Sakamoto Days	Nao Toramaru	
2025	The Unaware Atelier Master	Mimico	
2026	The Strongest Job Is Apparently Not a Hero or a Sage, but an Appraiser (Provisional)!	Hibiki Manabe	
2026	The Warrior Princess and the Barbaric King	Yupha	
2026	The Salty Koharu Has a Soft Spot for Me	Mayo Nezu	
2027	Wound & Bandage	Riyo Washizu	

=== Original net animation ===
Year	Title	Role	Note
2014	Pretty Guardian Sailor Moon Crystal Season I	Ami Mizuno/Sailor Mercury	Dark Kingdom
2015	Pretty Guardian Sailor Moon Crystal Season II	Ami Mizuno/Sailor Mercury	Black Moon arc
2016–2017	Koro Sensei Quest	Hinano Kurahashi	
2018	Monster Strike	Mana	
2021–2023	Cute Executive Officer	Mayu Warito	
2021	The Way of the Househusband	Sky Police	
2023	Junji Ito Maniac: Japanese Tales of the Macabre	Sayoko	
2023	Gamera Rebirth	Boko	

=== Anime films ===
Year	Title	Role	Notes
2011	Children Who Chase Lost Voices	Asuna Watase	
2012	Pretty Cure All Stars New Stage: Friends of the Future	Yayoi Kise / Cure Peace	
2012	Smile PreCure! The Movie: Big Mismatch in a Picture Book!	Yayoi Kise / Cure Peace	
2013	Aura: Koga Maryuin's Last War	Shinako Kobato	
2013	Pretty Cure All Stars New Stage 2: Friends of the Heart	Yayoi Kise / Cure Peace	
2013	The Garden of Sinners: Future Gospel	Mana Ryougi	
2014	Pretty Cure All Stars New Stage 3: Eternal Friends	Yayoi Kise / Cure Peace	
2015	Girls und Panzer der Film	Katyusha	
2018	Hug! Pretty Cure Futari wa Pretty Cure: All Stars Memories	Yayoi Kise / Cure Peace	
2019	BanG Dream! Film Live	Tsugumi Hazawa	
2021	BanG Dream! Episode of Roselia	Tsugumi Hazawa	Two-part film series
2021	BanG Dream! Film Live 2nd Stage	Tsugumi Hazawa	
2021	Pretty Guardian Sailor Moon Eternal The Movie	Ami Mizuno/Super Sailor Mercury	Two-part film, Season 4 of Sailor Moon Crystal (Dead Moon arc)
2021	Natsume's Book of Friends: The Waking Rock and the Strange Visitor	Mitsumi	
2021	Knights of Sidonia: Love Woven in the Stars	Yuhata Midorikawa	
2023	Pretty Guardian Sailor Moon Cosmos The Movie	Ami Mizuno/Eternal Sailor Mercury	Two-part film, Season 5 of Sailor Moon Crystal (Shadow Galactica arc)

=== Original video animation ===
- Food Wars!: Shokugeki no Soma (Erina Nakiri)
- Baby Princess 2D Paradise 0 (Watayuki Amatsuka)
- Star-Myu: High School Star Musical (2016) (Tsumugi Nayuki)
- Onna no Sono no Hoshi (2022) (Mayumi Kubota)

=== Video games ===
- Koumajou Densetsu II: Stranger's Requiem (2010) (Flandre Scarlet)
- Otomedius Excellent (2011) (Dark Force)
- Kokoro Connect Yochi Random (2012) (Yui Kiriyama)
- Photo Kano (2012) (Mai Sakura)
- Rune Factory 4 (2012) (Xiao Pai)
- Smile PreCure! Let's Go! Marchenland (2012) (Yayoi Kise / Cure Peace)
- Kantai Collection (2013) (Japanese destroyer Harusame, Hayashimo, Kiyoshimo and Hoppō Seiki)
- Senran Kagura Shinovi Versus (2013) (Murakumo)
- The Legend of Heroes: Trails of Cold Steel (2013) (Fie Claussell)
- Granblue Fantasy (2014) (Djeeta)
- Gunslinger Stratos (2014) (Kyouka Katagiri)
- Super Heroine Chronicle (2014) (Meru)
- The Legend of Heroes: Trails of Cold Steel II (2014) (Fie Claussell)
- Senran Kagura: Bon Appétit! (2014) (Murakumo)
- God Eater 2 (2015) (Livie Collete)
- Sword Art Online: Lost Song (2015) (Seven)
- Tekken 7 (2015) (Lucky Chloe)
- Fire Emblem Fates (2015) (Sakura)
- Lilycle Rainbow Stage!!! (2015) (Mariya Natsuki)
- Senran Kagura Estival Versus (2015) (Murakumo)
- Fate/Grand Order (2016) (Helena Blavatsky, Archer Inferno/Tomoe Gozen)
- Girls' Frontline (2016) (Saiga-12, PzB 39)
- BanG Dream! Girls Band Party! (2017) (Tsugumi Hazawa)
- Accel World vs. Sword Art Online (2017) (Seven)
- Magia Record (2017) (Karin Misono)
- The Legend of Heroes: Trails of Cold Steel III (2017) (Fie Claussell)
- Azur Lane (2017) (Jintsū, Kent, Black Prince)
- Senran Kagura: Peach Beach Splash (2017) (Murakumo)
- Princess Connect! Re:Dive (2018) (Djeeta)
- The Legend of Heroes: Trails of Cold Steel IV (2018) (Fie Claussell)
- Arknights (2019) (Ptilopsis)
- The Legend of Heroes: Trails into Reverie (2020) (Fie Claussell)
- Blue Archive (2021) (Junko Akashi)
- 100% Orange Juice (2021) (Cook)
- Melty Blood: Type Lumina (2021) (Miyako Arima)
- Honkai Impact 3rd (2022) (Vill-V)
- Genshin Impact (2022) (Nilou)
- Granblue Fantasy: Relink (2023) (Djeeta)
- Goddess of Victory: Nikke (2024) (Grave)
- Wuthering Waves (2025) (Chisa)
- Arknights: Endfield (2026) (Ardelia)
- Goblin Slayer Another Adventurer: Nightmare Feast (TBA) (Lady of Principality)

=== Dubbing ===
==== Live-action ====
- Begin Again – Violet Mulligan (Hailee Steinfeld)

==== Animation ====
- The Last Summoner – Flame

== Discography ==
=== Albums ===
- Fantastic Voyage (2014)
