= Hiromi Igarashi =

Japanese voice actress (born 1986)

- 五十嵐 裕美
- Born: December 13, 1986 (age 39); Sapporo, Hokkaido, Japan
- Occupation: Voice actress
- Years active: 2008–present
- Agent: Mausu Promotion
- Height: 151 cm (4 ft 11 in)

Hiromi Igarashi (五十嵐 裕美, Igarashi Hiromi; born December 13, 1986) is a Japanese voice actress from Sapporo, Hokkaido. She is affiliated with Mausu Promotion. Her major roles are Anzu Futaba in the Japanese idol franchise The Idolmaster Cinderella Girls; Hina Takanashi, the youngest daughter in Listen to Me, Girls. I Am Your Father!; Minori in the Senran Kagura series, and Wilhelmina in High School Fleet.

== Filmography ==
=== Anime ===
List of voice performances in anime
Year	Title	Role	Notes	Source
2008	You're Under Arrest: Full Throttle	Girl	Ep. 16	
2008	Ayakashi	Child	Ep. 9	
2008	Yu-Gi-Oh 5D's	West		
2008	Nijū Mensō no Musume	Audience		
2008	Kyōran Kazoku Nikki	Shinobu Shinki		
2009	Kupū~!! Mamegoma!	Taunton		
2009	The Beast Player Erin	Saju		
2009	Kanamemo	Girl, Classmate		
2009	Modern Magic Made Simple	Boy		
2009	Nogizaka Haruka no Himitsu: Purezza	Koayu Nagikawa	Also OVA in 2012	
2009	Hellsing Ultimate	Pip Bernadotte (boy)	Hellsing Ultimate VII	
2010	Ladies versus Butlers!	Schoolgirl		
2010	Baka and Test series	Yūka Koyama	2 seasons	
2010	The Qwaser of Stigmata	Eva S.		
2010	Hanamaru Kindergarten	Yū Kobayakawa		
2010	HeartCatch PreCure!	Boy		
2010	Maid Sama!	Aoi Hyoudou		
2010–11	Mitsudomoe series	Kamo, Kurano, Ueno	2 seasons	
2010	Oreimo	Rinko		
2010	Fortune Arterial	Schoolgirl, Committee member		
2010	Princess Jellyfish	Child		
2011	Dream Eater Merry	Masaru		
2011	Mitsudomoe Zouryouchuu!	Girl		
2011	I Don't Like You at All, Big Brother!!	Shūsuke Takanashi (child)		
2011	Bakugan Battle Brawlers: Gundalian Invaders	Lewin		
2011	Tono to Issho: Gantai no Yabō	Shimadzu Kagak		
2011	Jewelpet Sunshine	Alex		
2011	Blade	Alice		
2011	Battle Spirits: Heroes	Boy		
2011	Fate/Zero	Boy		
2011	Chihayafuru	Tomihara Nishi High School Karuta Department members		
2012	The Knight in the Area	Chika Takase		
2012–13	Listen to Me, Girls. I Am Your Father! series	Hina Takanashi		
2012	Black Rock Shooter	Various characters		
2012	Zoobles	Blackie, Rou, Peel, Randy, Mei, Lily		
2012	Gon	Fu		
2012	Kuromajo-san ga Toru!!	Sayaka Suzukaze		
2012	Natsuiro Kiseki	Various characters		
2012	Sengoku Collection	Boy		
2012	Shirokuma Cafe	Customer, child, clerk		
2012	Jewelpet KiraDeco—!	Alex		
2012	Another: The Other -Inga	Misaki Fujioka	OVA	
2012	Tanken Driland	Leo (young)		
2012	Haitai Nanafa	Iina		
2013	Amnesia	Orion		
2013	Tamako Market	Tatsuya		
2013	Problem Children Are Coming from Another World, Aren't They?	Jin Rassel		
2013	Karneval	Hitsuji, Usagi		
2013	Angel's Drop	Un		
2013	Dog & Scissors	Yayoi Honda		
2013	Noucome	Seira Kokubyakuin		
2014	Sakura Trick	Shizuku Minami		
2014	No-Rin	Akina Nakazawa		
2014	Kamigami no Asobi	Keiko		
2014	Haikyu!!	Tennis Club Girl		
2014	Knights of Sidonia	Hinata Momose		
2014	Rail Wars!	Mari Sasshō		
2014	Fūsen inu tinī ja:ティニー ふうせんいぬのものがたり	Zevi		
2014	Aikatsu!	Asahi Higashi	season 3	
2014	Log Horizon	Coppelia	season 2	
2014	Amagi Brilliant Park	Eiko Adachi		
2014	Gonna be the Twin-Tail!!	Miharu Mitsuka		
2014	Girl Friend Beta	Sumire Yomogida		
2015	The Idolmaster Cinderella Girls	Anzu Futaba	2 seasons	
2015	The Rolling Girls	Himeko Uotora		
2015	Jewelpet: Magical Change	Alex		
2015–21	Show By Rock series	Holmy		
2015	Senran Kagura: Estival Versus – Festival Eve Full of Swimsuits	Minori	OVA	
2015–16	Durarara!!x2 series	Mikage Sharaku		
2015	Overlord	Yuri Alpha		
2015	The Kindaichi Case Files R	Nazuki Unza	series 2	
2015	Concrete Revolutio	Morino Wakaba		
2015	Dōshitemo Eto ni Hairitai' ja:どうしても干支にはいりたい	Usagi		
2016	Haruchika	Misato Aso		
2016	The Lost Village	Lion		
2016	Joker Game	Boy (cousin)		
2016	High School Fleet	Wilhelmina Braunschweig Ingenohl Friedeburg		
2016	Tales of Zestiria the X	Symonne		
2016	Tsukita the Animation ja:ツキウタ。 THE ANIMATION	Girls spirit		
2016	Kaiju Girls	Red King		
2016	Odddy Taro Boys' Youkai Picture Diary ja:奇異太郎少年の妖怪絵日記	Taro Oda		
2016	Brave Witches	Edytha Rossmann		
2016	Long Riders!	Aoi Niigaki		
2017	Piacevole!	Sara Teiri		
2017–20	Tsugumomo series	Suzuri Sumeragi		
2017–19	The Idolmaster Cinderella Girls Theater series	Anzu Futaba	4 seasons	
2017	Battle Girl High School	Hinata Minami		
2017	NTR: Netsuzou Trap	Hotaru Mizushina		
2017	Juni Taisen: Zodiac War	Kanae Aira		
2017	Crayon Shin-chan	Female Staff, Weathergirl B		
2018	Beatless	Snowdrop		
2019	Mini Toji	Kofuki Shichinosato		
2020	Maesetsu!	Rin Shinya		
2021	Ancient Girl's Frame	Akhena Hakim		
2023	Flaglia	Iko		
2023	Bleach: Thousand-Year Blood War	Yūshirō Shihōin		
2023	The Demon Sword Master of Excalibur Academy	Elfiné		
2025	Guilty Gear Strive: Dual Rulers	Jack-O' Valentine		
2026	The Food Diary of Miss Maid	Anzu Shingetsu		
2026	Hanaori-san Still Wants to Fight in the Next Life	Eriko Asahina		

=== Films ===
List of voice performances in films
Year	Title	Role	Notes	Source
2008	The Garden of Sinners: Paradox Spiral	Tomoe Enjou (child）		
2010	Loups=Garous	Ayumi Kono		
2012	Buta	Kitsune's younger brother		
2012	Wasurenagumo	Voice of the back		
2013	Puella Magi Madoka Magica: The Movie: Rebellion	Schoolgirl		
2015	Arpeggio of Blue Steel: Ars Nova DC	Haguro		
2015	Knights of Sidonia Movie	Hinata Momose		
2015	Arpeggio of Blue Steel -Ars Nova Cadenza-	Haguro		
2016	selector destructed WIXOSS	Umuru		
2020	High School Fleet: The Movie	Wilhelmina Braunschweig Ingenohl Friedeburg		

=== Video games ===
List of voice performances in video games
Year	Title	Role	Notes	Source
2008	Tatsunoko vs. Capcom: Cross Generation of Heroes	Roll	Wii, also 2010 Ultimate All-Stars	
2010	Class of Heroes 2G	Coppa	PS3	
2010–11	Corpse Party series	Nana Ogasawara, Yuki Kanno, Yu Shinohara	PSP	
2010	Class of Heroes 3	Amaryllis	PSP	
2010	Armen Noir ja:アーメン・ノワール	Shanthao	PS2, also PSP in 2012	
2011	Ore no Imōto ga Konna ni Kawaii Wake ga Nai Portable	Rinko	PSP	
2011–14	Amnesia series	Orion	PSP	
2012	Fire Emblem Awakening	Maribelle	3DS	
2012	Game Demo Papa no Iu Koto wo Kikinasai!	Hina Takanashi	PSP	
2012	Tales of Xillia 2	Maki	PS3	
2013	Monster Monpiece	Irene	Other	
2013	Senran Kagura Shinovi Versus	Minori		
2013	Arcadian's Senki ja:アルカディアスの戦姫	Uni	PS3	
2014	Girls' Frontline	KS-23	Mobile Games	
2014	Senran Kagura: Bon Appétit!	Minori		
2014	Tokyo New Arrival Operation Abyss ja:東京新世録 オペレーションアビス	Masami Masamasa 村正真麻	Other	
2014	Etrian Odyssey 2 Untold: The Fafnir Knight	High Raggard daughter	DS	
2015	Tales of Zestiria	Symonne	PS3	
2015–16	Senran Kagura: Estival Versus series	Minori		
2015	Battle Girl High School	Hinata Minami		
2015	Tokyo New Arrival Operation Babel ja:東京新世録 オペレーションバベル	Iris		
2015	Nights of Azure	Lilysse	PS3, others	
2015	Criminal Girls 2	Sui Shiihara		
2016	Street Fighter V	R. Mika	PC, PS4	
2016	Hero Must Die	Sara	PS Vita	
2016	Medabots: Girls Mission	Kiyomi Shino	DS	
2016	Guilty Gear Xrd -REVELATOR-	Jack-O' Valentine		
2016	Mary Skelter: Nightmares	Kaguya Hime	Other	
2016	Atelier Firis: The Alchemist and the Mysterious Journey	Lewis Vester	Other	
	The Idolmaster Cinderella Girls	Anzu Futaba		
	Million Arthur	Cracky		
2017	Azur Lane	HMS Glowworm グローウォーム	Android, iOS	
2017	Kirara Fantasia	Fennel	Android, iOS	
2019	A Certain Magical Index: Imaginary Fest	Marian Slingeneyer	Android, iOS	
2021	Guilty Gear -STRIVE-	Jack-O' Valentine	PC, PS4, PS5	
2021	Muse Dash	Reimu Hakurei	PC	
2022	AI: The Somnium Files – Nirvana Initiative	Shoma	PC, PS4, Xbox One, Nintendo Switch	
2022	Blue Archive	Kokona Sunohara	Android, iOS	
2024	Zenless Zone Zero	Corin Wickes	Android, iOS, PC	

=== Drama CD ===
List of voice performances in drama CDs
Year	Title	Role	Notes	Source
2008	Night on the Galactic Railroad	Child		
2010	Maid Sama!	Aoi Hyoudou		
2011	Dragon Nest: Prelude～Unmei no Mezame～	Lily		
2014	Gonna be the Twin-Tail!!	Miharu Mitsuka		
	Dog & Scissors	Yayoi Honda		

=== Dubbing ===
- The Diary of a Teenage Girl as Minnie Goetze (Bel Powley)
