= List of Senran Kagura episodes =

Senran Kagura is an anime television series based on the video game series by Marvelous AQL and Tamsoft. The series revolve around a group of five girls who are training to become ninjas at the secret Hanzou Academy, whilst facing off against the dark ninja of Hiritsu Hebi Girl's Academy.

The first series, known as Senran Kagura Ninja Flash in its English release, was directed by Takashi Watanabe at Artland with scripts by Takao Yoshioka and character designs by Takashi Torii. The series aired in Japan between January 6, 2013, and March 24, 2013, and was licensed in North America by Funimation, who simulcast the series as it aired. The opening theme is "Break Your World" by Sayaka Sasaki whilst the ending themes are "Fighting Dreamer" by Hitomi Harada, Asami Imai, Yū Kobayashi, Kaori Mizuhashi and Yuka Iguchi, "Yamiyo wa Otome wo Hana ni Suru" (闇夜は乙女を花にする, The Flowers of the Girls of the Night) by Eri Kitamura, Ai Kayano, Ryōko Shiraishi, Saori Gotō and Megumi Toyoguchi, and "Shissōron" (疾走論, Theory Sprint) by Hitomi Harada. An original video animation by Hoods Entertainment was released on March 24, 2015.

A second TV series, Senran Kagura Shinovi Master: Tokyo Youma Chapter, is being directed by Tetsuya Yanagisawa and produced by TNK, with scripts written by Yukinori Kitajima and character designs handled by Junji Goto. The season began airing from October 13, 2018, on AT-X, Tokyo MX, and BS11. (Note: From the tv network it lists the show at 24:00 on October 12, which is at October 13, 2018 at 12:00 a.m.) Crunchyroll is simulcasting the series in censored and uncensored versions with Funimation streaming an English dub. The opening theme is "Scarlet Master" by Sayaka Sasaki, while the ending theme is "Junsei Erotic" (純正エロティック) by Mia Regina.

== Episode list ==
=== Senran Kagura Ninja Flash (2013) ===
No.	Title	Original release date
1	"Ninja That Stand Atop Skyscrapers"; Transliteration: "Matenrō ni Tatsu Shinobi" (Japanese: 摩天楼に立つ忍者)	January 6, 2013
Asuka, Ikaruga, Katsuragi, Yagyu and Hibari are five school girls who secretly train in the ninja arts. As they are sent by their mentor, Kiriya, to handle some delinquents in town, Asuka meets a girl named Homura and helps guide her through town, unaware that she is secretly an enemy shinobi. Meanwhile, the others encounter the delinquents, who are soon revealed to be wooden puppets controlled by an enemy shinobi. As the girls manage to beat the puppets, Asuka remains blissfully unaware of Homura's true alliance.
2	"The Legendary Shinobi Appears"; Transliteration: "Densetsu no Shinobi Arawareru" (Japanese: 伝説の忍あらわる)	January 13, 2013
As the girls train in summoning animal spirits, Asuka is the only one having trouble summoning hers. Her grandfather, the legendary shinobi Hanzou, comes to visit and informs her that their family's spirit is the tree frog, which Asuka is afraid of. As Asuka attempts to get used to frogs, Hanzou informs Kiriya that the evil Serpent Academy for Girls is behind the puppet attack. On their way home, Asuka and Ikaruga are attacked by one of the enemy shinobi, Yomi.
3	"Moonlight Intruder"; Transliteration: "Gekka no Shinnyūsha" (Japanese: 月下の侵入者)	January 20, 2013
Yomi engages Ikaruga in battle and overwhelms her with her array of weapons before taking her leave. Later, Ikaruga is informed that her brother, Murasame, who she replaced to become the shinobi successor of her family, has gone missing. Later that night, Ikaruga encounters Murasame in her room stealing her sword, Hien, but she manages to send him packing easily enough. After being ejected from the household, Murasame is met by Hanzou, who reminds him that being a shinobi isn't the only way of life. After receiving some advice from Hanzou, Ikaruga decides to start giving Asuka summoning lessons, managing to help her get over her fear of frogs and learn to use her summoning art.
4	"Seaside Training - Shinobi Island"; Transliteration: "Rinkai Shugyō Shinobitō" (Japanese: 臨海修行・忍島)	January 27, 2013
Kiriya takes the girls to Shinobi Island to train. Two more dark shinobis, Mirai and Hikage, attack. As with the other battles, neither Mirai nor Hikage took their battles seriously and left rather abruptly. However, Mirai revealed to Hibari that she is a freshman at the Serpent Academy for Girls, leading Kiriya to inform his students that these dark shinobis are also from that same academy.
5	"Sneak Attack! Hanzo Academy"; Transliteration: "Kishū! Hanzō Gakuin!" (Japanese: 奇襲!半蔵学院)	February 3, 2013
The dark shinobis from the Serpent Academy receive new orders to make an attack on Hanzou Academy. Haruka, the puppeteer, sets up puppets to distract Asuka and the others while a linked barrier is set up to separate the group and force them into their own battles. Asuka finally finds out that Homura is a dark shinobi from the Serpent Academy and is forced into battle. Yagyuu is set up against Mirai, Hibari is set up against Haruka, Katsuragi gets a rematch against Hikage, and Ikaruga is forced to battle against Yomi. This time, the dark shinobis appear to be taking things more seriously. The instructor of these 5 dark shinobis, Suzune, speaks with a mysterious voice about obtaining a scroll known as "Yang" from Hanzou Academy. The Serpent Academy holds a scroll known as "Yin", but their goal is to obtain the "Yang" scroll from Hanzou Academy.
6	"Interlocking Shinobi Kekkai Barriers"; Transliteration: "Rendō Shinobi Kekkai" (Japanese: 連動忍結界)	February 10, 2013
The battles from the last episode continue. Mirai loses her battle against Yagyuu, causing the Linked Shinobi Barrier to become weaker and the dark shinobis to retreat. Despite the Hanzou Academy students putting up a better fight, Yagyuu was the only one that won her fight. Yagyuu was injured trying to save Hibari, but recovered quickly. It is revealed that Yagyuu looks after Hibari because Yagyuu sees a lot of her late sister in Hibari. Hanzou returns to the Academy to discuss the situation with Kiriya and informs him that "it is time to find a successor to the super secret ninja arts". The scroll that contains these arts chooses its owner. Who will it be?
7	"Hiking Terror"; Transliteration: "Kyōfu no Haikingu" (Japanese: 恐怖のハイキング)	February 17, 2013
A woman named Daidouji, a "legendary senior" who has been repeating class at Hanzou Academy of her own accord despite passing the finals, convinces Kiriya to send his girls on "HIKING" training...But this wasn't your typical hike! This was a 2-day trek full of obstacles for each of the students to overcome and make it to the top of a mountain to find the scroll. Asuka learned an important lesson after fighting a giant cat, which seemed to be Daidouji in disguise, in that she worried too much about living up to the fact that she's the granddaughter of a legendary shinobi. And in another nice turn of events, Hibari saved Yagyuu from piranhas. The 5 of them made it to the top at the same time, only to find Daidouji waiting at the top. In order to take the scroll, Daidouji said that they need to defeat her. None of them could do it, but Daidouji concluded that Asuka deserved it the most because of an attack that almost took her by surprise. The scroll reads: "Power is both sword and shield".
8	"A Shinobi Classroom Retrospective"; Transliteration: "Tsuioku no Shinboi Kyōshitsu" (Japanese: 追憶の忍教室)	February 24, 2013
For most of this episode, we see flashbacks. Each to which flashed back to when all 5 of the girls first joined the Academy. We find out how Katsuragi teaches Ikaruga to open up. And when Asuka first joined, she appeared to be just an amateur, but eventually began showing promising signs. Finally, there was a flashback to when Yagyuu and Hibari had first joined. Once the flashbacks ended, Suzune and the mysterious leader of the Serpent Academy continued to discuss plans to obtain Hanzou Academy's Yang scroll. At the end of the episode, the pin that Haruka gave to Hibari begins to glow, and it appears as though Hibari may have become Haruka's puppet.
9	"Hebijo Clandestine Girls' Academy"; Transliteration: "Hiritsu Hebi Joshigakuen" (Japanese: 秘立蛇女子学園)	March 3, 2013
Under Haruka's control, Hibari knocks out Kiriya and steals the Yang scroll. The next day, Haruka appears before Hibari and retrieves the scroll from her, saying she will most likely be labelled a traitor by the light faction and should join Serpent Academy. Feeling she needs to do something, Hibari decides to go to Serpent Academy so she can retrieve the scroll, leaving a note behind for the others. When Yagyuu learns of this, Asuka stops her before she does some rash, assuring her that she is not to blame. Meanwhile, Hibari arrives at Serpent Academy, where she is enrolled as a student and learns how Homura and the others came to join the dark faction. She is also introduced to their teacher, Suzune, which rings a sense of nostalgia to her. As the Hanzou Academy girls try to determine the location of Serpent Academy, Yagyuu mentions to Kiriya about how Asuka was able to dodge her attack. Later that night, Suzune appears before Kiriya and challenges him to a duel, revealing her identity to be Rin, his former student who was presumed dead. She leaves him a map to Serpent Academy, saying she will be waiting for him there.
10	"Yin and Yang"; Transliteration: "In to Yo" (Japanese: 陰と陽)	March 10, 2013
Having overheard Kiriya's conversation with Rin, the group make plans to travel to Serpent Academy, with Hanzou giving his approval despite Kiriya's concerns. Meanwhile, Hibari attempts to locate the stolen scroll, where she overhears Rin speaking with her leader about her plan to lure the Hanzou Academy girls in order to utilise the power of the Ying and Yang scrolls, which is seen as an act of betrayal. As the Hanzou girls set off, Kiriya and Daidouji decide to follow after them. As Hibari asks the other girls how they feel about their teacher, she gets the feeling that they're not bad girls at heart. Later that night, Hibari listens in as the other girls are informed of Rin's apparent betrayal and are instructed to eliminate any intruders, with their lives at forfeit should they lose due to a forbidden art placed upon them. However, Hibari is caught by Haruka and locked up alongside Rin. Meanwhile, the Hanzou girls begin their infiltration, with Yagyuu managing to use Hibari's scent to locate the secret entrance to the academy, coming face to face with Yomi.
11	"Castle Showdown"; Transliteration: "Kessen Tenshukaku" (Japanese: 決戦天守閣)	March 17, 2013
Ikaruga decides to face Yomi alone whilst the others press onwards whilst Rin, after a brief talk with Hibari, breaks free from her cell. Yomi explains her resentment towards Ikaruga came from her living in poverty and having her parents starve to death whilst Ikaruga lived a rich life in the mansion looming above her. However, Ikaruga responds that would've given anything to have the same love from her parents as Yomi had and comes at her with her full power. Meanwhile, Katsuragi and Yagyuu end up having to face Hikage and Mirai whilst Asuka heads onwards and comes up against Homura. Back at the cells, Haruka explains to Hibari how she was smothered by her mother like a doll before being scouted by Rin. Hibari then fights against Haruka in a hopes of finding a way to break the curse placed upon her and the others. After managing to beat back Haruka with her hidden art, Hibari uses powerful telepathy to inform the others about the curse, urging them to instead find the man who placed it upon them, before Haruka knocks her out. Hearing this, Ikaruga and Katsuragi quickly end their battles and head towards the top of the castle whilst Yagyuu heads to Hibari's location, with Ikaruga telling Yomi about how she was adopted before heading off.
12	"Super-Secret Ninja Art"; Transliteration: "Chō Hiden Ninpo" (Japanese: 超秘伝忍法)	March 24, 2013
As Asuka continues fighting against Homura, she sees a glimpse of her memories, in which she was betrayed by a man she thought loved her and killed him, before using a shockwave technique to escape. Meanwhile, Rin explains to Kiriya how she initially planned to have her students beat his in order to prove herself the better ninja. However the dark faction's leader, Dougen, issued a new plan behind her back to try and combine the scrolls. Whilst Ikaruga and Katsuragi push past Yomi and Hikage, Yagyuu catches up to Hibari and manage to get past Haruka and Mirai. As Asuka reaches the top of the tower and once again clashes with Homura, Dougen makes his appearance, stating he plans to wield the power of the scrolls by using them as vessels. Asuka and Homura are forced inside a shinobi barrier where they must face against Dougen's secret ninja art, Orochi, whilst the other shinobi team up to fight against a legion of mechanical guards. Homura prepares to sacrifice herself to stop Dougen, but Asuka holds her back, asking her to have faith in her friends. Sure enough, Hibari manages to combine her power with the others to break through the barrier, using their spirits to power Asuka and Homura up, allowing them to retrieve the scrolls and defeat Dougen. Pushed into a corner, Dougen sets the castle to self-destruct, so the Serpent girls stay behind to help the other students evacuate whilst Rin sacrifices herself to take Dougen with her. Some time later, Asuka gets promoted before everyone sets off on summer vacation, confident that they will one day meet the Serpent girls once more, as no bodies were ever found amongst the castle's wreckage.

==== Bonus episodes ====
The following original video animations were originally released with each BD/DVD volume. Due to rights issues, these are not included in Funimation's English home video release.

No.	Title	Release date
1	"Heart-pounding Body Measurement"; Transliteration: "Dokidoki Karada Sokutei" (Japanese: どきどき身体測定)	March 27, 2013
Katsuragi gets playful with Asuka whilst performing body measurements.
2	"Protect Hibari's Naked Body!"; Transliteration: "Hibari no Hadaka o Kakusu no da!" (Japanese: 雲雀の裸を隠すのだ！)	April 24, 2013
Yagyuu goes to extreme lengths to try and prevent Hibari's naked body from being exposed.
3	"I Want to Put my Face in your Chest!"; Transliteration: "Sono Mune ni Kao o Umetai!" (Japanese: その胸に顔を埋めたい！)	May 29, 2013
Wanting inspiration for her poems, Ikaruga curiously requests to stick her face in Katsuragi's chest.
4	"Ikaruga Style Exercise"; Transliteration: "Ikaruga-shiki Ekusasaizu" (Japanese: 斑鳩式エクササイズ)	June 26, 2013
Noticing Hibari and Yagyuu looking a little chubby, Ikaruga puts them through an exercise regime.
5	"Forbidden! The Sealed Fear!"; Transliteration: "Kindan! Akazunoma no Kyōfu!" (Japanese: 禁断！開かずの間の恐怖！)	July 24, 2013
Asuka and Ikaruga come across a sealed gym storage area which turns out to contain some very special training devices.
6	"A Rival Showdown Without Humanity or Justice!"; Transliteration: "Jingi Naki Raibaru Taiketsu!" (Japanese: 仁義なきライバル対決!)	August 28, 2013
At least, the final battle between Asuka and Homura... which takes a very strange turn on Hanzo's insistence.

=== Senran Kagura Estival Versus – Festival Eve Full of Swimsuits (2015 OVA) ===
No.	Title	Original release date
OVA	"Senran Kagura: Estival Versus – Festival Eve Full of Swimsuits"; Transliteration: "Senran Kagura: Estival Versus – Mizugi-darake no Zen'yasai" (Japanese: 閃乱カグラ ESTIVAL VERSUS -水着だらけの前夜祭-)	March 26, 2015
A letter arrives at Death Cram School. Inside is an invitation to a spa resort. While Yumi declares to the four excited girls that, "This is evil itself," and points out that they are slacking off too much. After losing a game of boob rock-paper-scissors, however, the five kunoichi go to the resort. There, the five girls from Hanzō Academy, Homura Crimson Squad, and Hebijo Clandestine Girls' Academy also come, but decide to call a temporary truce. However, a trivial matter sets off a sour quarrel and they settle it with a showdown in the style of the ancient shinobi.

=== Senran Kagura Shinovi Master (2018) ===
No.	Title	Original release date
1	"CHANGE THE WORLD"	October 12, 2018
Asuka and Yumi run into each other while doing their Christmas shopping and spend some time together, talking about how they balance their lives as both high school girls and shinobi. While Yumi searches for a present that Asuka dropped, the other Hanzo girls are suddenly attacked by two girls named Gekkou and Senkou, and later overwhelmed Asuka.
2	"PBS"	October 19, 2018
Unaware of what happened to Asuka, Yumi and her Gessen squad receive a message inviting them to a spa resort. Meanwhile, Homura's Crimson squad come up against Miyabi and her Hebijo squad during a mission, during which both teams receive the same invitations. Accepting the invitations, the three squads go to the resort together and have a water gun fight in which they aim to make their opponents' swimsuits transparent, which ultimately ends in a tie. The girls are then confronted by Gekkou and Senkou, who announce that they are holding the Hanzo girls as hostages to force everyone to take part in a Shinobi Masters tournament. Afterwards, Yumi comes across Asuka, the only one not captured by the pair, whose sense of justice has been shattered by her defeat.
3	"ROCKET DIVE"	October 26, 2018
Following a heated conflict with Asuka, Yumi comes across Homura, who invites her to a hot spring to heal up her injuries. Meanwhile, youma hunter Kagura is approached by a mysterious woman named Fubuki, who invites her to the tournament to face off against the ultimate youma. Back at the spring, Homura is confronted by Asuka, who uses underhanded means in order to defeat her and keep her out of the tournament.
4	"IT'S SHOWTIME!!"	November 2, 2018
Learning that Gekkou and Senkou are students of Gessen Middle School, Yumi and her team infiltrate the middle school to investigate. The girls soon come up against the pair, who state they intend to follow the teachings of Yumi's grandfather, Kurokage. After Asuka sneaks into the location the night before, the Shinobi Masters tournament begins.
5	"BE HONEST"	November 9, 2018
The Shinobi Masters tournament is underway. Three squads compete while Asuka watches from the sidelines. Yumi and her squad emerge victorious, but must face the tournament organizers. Asuka joins Yumi.
6	"SHINOVI VERSUS"	November 16, 2018
Asuka and Yumi are battling Gekkou and Senkou. Meanwhile, Homura and Miyabi are trying to rescue girls from Asuka's squad, being held as hostages. Gekkou and Senkou are defeated, and Yumi wants to face Fubuki, the organizer of Shinobi Masters tournament.
7	"WE'LL MEET AGAIN"	November 23, 2018
Yumi fights Fubuki. At some point Fubuki enters her true form, defeats Yumi, while also revealing herself to be her childhood friend. Fubuki then declares war to all shinobi.
8	"DON'T STOP BELIEVING"	November 30, 2018
After declaring war on shinobi, Fubuki sees herself out. Girls from Asuka's squad are rescued, Yumi stops Gekkou and Senkou from committing suicide and befriends them. All four squads are joining forces and prepare to fight Fubuki's demons.
9	"BURN"	December 7, 2018
Shinobi squads are battling demons in the city. After small ones are defeated, big demon emerges, but ultimately gets overwhelmed. When the girls are ready to kill it, Asuka enters the stage and seals it instead. After a while, Yumi tries to get answers from Asuka, when Fubuki appears and tells Yumi that demons might not be as evil as Yumi thought.
10	"TWO HEARTS"	December 14, 2018
The next door to the other world will open in a hot springs town. The team goes there to be ready to fight, but first, they need to stay in the hot springs.
11	"LIFE IS BEAUTIFUL"	December 21, 2018
The door to the other world is open and yoma are pouring through. Katsuragi comes up with a plan to use the girls as bait so that they can be sealed. But Asuka is getting more and more worn down.
12	"HOMETOWN"	December 28, 2018
Rasetsu fights the shinobi while Yumi battles Fubuki. Fubuki is insistent that she will slay all the shinobi, no matter what it costs, and no matter what it means to her grandfather.
