= Hitomi Harada =

Japanese voice actress (born 1987)

- 原田 ひとみ
- Born: November 18, 1987 (age 38); Ube, Yamaguchi, Japan
- Occupations: Voice actress; singer
- Years active: 2003–present
- Agent: Office Anemone
- Height: 156 cm (5 ft 1 in)
- Website: harada-hitomi.com

Hitomi Harada (原田 ひとみ, Harada Hitomi; born November 18, 1987) is a Japanese voice actress and singer from Ube, Yamaguchi.

== Career ==
She was scouted as a singer and began singing in the TWOFIVE production company. After that, she joined the talent agency Production Baobab to work as a voice actress.

After transferring to Baobab, she mainly worked as a voice actress for dubbing, games, and Disney-related work, but began auditioning for animation around 2009, being her first leading role Mizuki Himeji in the anime series Baka and Test.

It was announced on her official blog that she stopped working for Production Baobab on September 10, 2016.

On January 6, 2020, Harada announced that she had joined Kikuko Inoue's own agency, Office Anemone.

== Filmography ==
=== Anime ===
2007

- Kimikiss Pure Rouge as Manami Hiba

2008

- Bleach as Menoly Mallia

2009

- Sasameki Koto as Tomoe Hachisuka

2010

- Amagami SS as Manaka Hiba, Mika Makihara
- Baka to Test to Shōkanjū as Mizuki Himeji
- Hidamari Sketch as Nori
- Hidamari Sketch (special) as Nori
- Highschool of the Dead as Takashi Komuro (child), Zeke

2011

- Baka to Test to Shōkanjū: Ni! as Mizuki Himeji
- Bakugan Battle Brawlers: Gundalian Invaders as Boy, Taylor
- Hidamari Sketch × SP as Nori
- Maken-ki! as Aki Nijou

2012

- Amagami SS+ plus as Manaka Hiba
- Another as Kirika
- Hidamari Sketch × Honeycomb as Nori
- High School DxD as Caramine

2013

- Muromi-san as Fuji-san
- Senran Kagura as Asuka
- Unbreakable Machine-Doll as Yaya

2014

- Girl Friend Beta as Erena Mochizuki
- Inugami-san to Nekoyama-san as Tamaki Nekoyama
- Lord Marksman and Vanadis as Valentina Glinka Estes
- Maken-Ki! Two as Aki Nijou

2015

- The Idolmaster Cinderella Girls as Airi Totoki
- The Idolmaster Cinderella Girls 2nd Season as Airi Totoki
- Valkyrie Drive as Momoka Sagara

2016

- Big Order as Kagekiyo Tairano

2017

- Battle Girl High School as Kokomi Asahina

2018

- Sword Gai as Kiyomi

2022

- Bleach: Thousand-Year Blood War as Menoly Mallia
- Miss Kuroitsu from the Monster Development Department as Elbakki

=== OVA ===
- Baka to Test to Shōkanjū: Matsuri as Mizuki Himeji
- Touhou Project Side Story: Memory of Star as Reisen Udongein Inaba, Marisa Kirisame

=== Movies ===
- The Disappearance of Haruhi Suzumiya as Kotone Kenmochi

=== Games ===
- Baka to Test to Shōkanjū: Portable as Mizuki Himeji
- Cambrian QTS
- Dream Club as Rui
- Elsword as Ruriel
- Futaba Riho
- Hoshi no Ōjo 2
- Hyperdimension Neptunia – MarvelousAQL
- KimiKiss
- Otomedius Excellent as Kokoro Belmont
- Senran Kagura – Asuka
- Senran Kagura Burst – Asuka
- Senran Kagura Shinovi Versus – Asuka
- Senran Kagura 2: Deep Crimson – Asuka
- Senran Kagura: Estival Versus Asuka
- Senran Kagura: Peach Beach Splash – Asuka
- Super Bomberman R – Karaoke Bomber
- The Idolmaster Cinderella Girls as Airi Totoki
- Yo-Jin-Bo
- Zoids Infinity EX NEO
- Zoids Generations

== Discography ==
- Little Explorer (contained theme song to Eden* They Were Only Two, On The Planet)
- Eternal Feather (contained theme song to Ef: A Fairy Tale of the Two.- The First Tale)
- Emotional Flutter (contained theme song to Ef: A Fairy Tale of the Two. – The Latter Tale)
- Ever Forever (contained theme song to Ef: A Fairy Tale of the Two.)
- Haru no Uta (contained theme song to Haru no Ashioto)
- Natsu Natsu Soundtrack (contained theme song to Natsu ☆ Natsu)
- Once (contained theme song to Itsuka Tenma no Kuro Usagi )
- Magenta Another Sky (contained theme song to La storia della Arcana Famiglia)
- Shissouron (contained theme song to Senran Kagura)
- Kyoumei no True Force (contained theme song to Seirei Tsukai no Blade Dance)
- Schwarzer Bogen (contained theme song to Madan no Ou to Vanadis)
