= Ancient Girl's Frame =

Japanese-Chinese anime television series

- Japanese key visual

闘神機ジーズフレーム (Tōshinki Jīzu Furēmu)
- Genre: Science fiction, Mecha
- Created by: Osamu Yamasaki
- Original net animation
- Directed by: Gong Zhenhua (chief)
- Written by: Osamu Yamasaki
- Music by: Shun Narita; ISAO
- Studio: Seven Stone
- Licensed by: Crunchyroll
- Released: October 11, 2021 – December 27, 2021
- Episodes: 12
- Novel series
- Written by: Mio Asagiri
- Original run: November 19, 2021 – January 9, 2022

Ancient Girl's Frame (Japanese: 闘神機ジーズフレーム, Hepburn: Tōshinki Jīzu Furēmu) is a Japanese-Chinese original net animation series which aired in Chinese on streaming platforms from October 11 to December 27, 2021, and on Japanese television on Tokyo MX the following day. The series is licensed in North America by Funimation.

== Characters ==
Reika Minamiya (南宮 麗香, Minamiya Reika)
Voiced by: Rie Takahashi
Luna Mariano Perez Lupiano (ルナ・マリアナ・ぺレス・ルピアノ, Runa Mariana Peresu Rupiano)
Voiced by: Aya Suzaki
Arjena Hakeem (アルヘナ・ハキーム, Aruhena Hakīmu)
Voiced by: Hiromi Igarashi
Judith Pearl (ジョティス・パール, Jotisu Pāru)
Voiced by: Kaori Ishihara
Eyre (エア, Ea)
Voiced by: Arisa Nakada
Reiu Minamiya (南宮 麗雨, Minamiya Reiu)
Voiced by: Ayana Taketatsu
Misaki Yoshizaki (吉崎 美咲, Yoshizaki Misaki)
Voiced by: Hisako Tōjō
Olivia McLean (オリビア・マクレーン, Oribia Makurēn)
Voiced by: Haruna Terada
Wong Lim Yi Cheng (ウォン・リム・イー・チェン, Won Rim Ī Chen)
Voiced by: Honoka Kuroki
Aimée Blavet (エメ・ブラヴェ, Eme Burave)
Voiced by: Miyu Kubota
Kristina Artsebarsky (クリシュティナ・アルツェバルスキー, Kurishutina Arutsebarusukī)
Voiced by: Sayaka Harada
Ray Burk (レイ・バーク, Rei Bāku)
Voiced by: Katsuji Mori
Mikatsuki Williams (ミカツキ・ウィリアムズ, Mikatsuki Wiriamuzu)
Voiced by: Hitomi Nabatame
Gen Minamiya (南宮 巌, Minamiya Gen)
Voiced by: Takanori Hoshino
Wang Lihua (王梨花, Wan Rīfa)
Voiced by: Sayaka Ōhara
Lee Dong-jin (イ・ドンジン, I Donjin)
Voiced by: Shōhei Yamaguchi
Ryo Takagi (リョウ・タカギ, Ryō Takagi)
Voiced by: Kōdai Sakai
Alex Robinson (アレックス・ロビンソン, Arekkusu Robinson)
Voiced by: Takashi Matsuyama
Carlos Greco Perez Garcia (カルロス・グレコ・ペレス・ガルシア, Karurosu Gureko Peresu Garushia)
Voiced by: Takuya Kirimoto
Zoe Peterson (ゾーイ・ピーターソン, Zōi Pītāson)
Voiced by: Eri Kitamura
Dai Shennong (ダイシェンノン, Daishennon)
Voiced by: Takanori Hoshino
Lua (ルア, Rua)
Voiced by: Ayaka Asai
Abigail Lotus (アヴィゲイル・ロータス, Avigeiru Rōtasu)
Voiced by: Chihiro Ishiguro
Dune Nadelman (デューン・ネーデルマン, Dyūn Nēderuman)
Voiced by: Tomofumi Ikezoe
Robert Halo (ロバート・ヘイロゥ, Robāto Heirō)
Voiced by: Shōhei Yamaguchi
Henry Narcissus Wilmarth (ヘンリー・ナーシサス・ウィルマース, Henrī Nāshisasu Wirumāsu)
Voiced by: Shin Aomori

== Episode list ==
No.	Title	Original release date
1	"G's Frame"	October 11, 2021
2	"AG Unit"; Transliteration: "AG Butai" (Japanese: AG部隊)	October 18, 2021
3	"Judith in the Stratosphere"; Transliteration: "Seisōken no Jotisu" (Japanese: 成層圏のジョティス)	October 25, 2021
4	"Gravestone on the Moon"; Transliteration: "Runa no Bohyō" (Japanese: 月の墓標)	November 1, 2021
5	"Normandy burns" Transliteration: "Norumandi Moyu" (Japanese: ノルマンディ燃ゆ)	November 8, 2021
6	"Eyre's Promise"; Transliteration: "Ea no Yakusoku" (Japanese: エアの約束)	November 15, 2021
7	Transliteration: "Fuwafuwa Reika" (Japanese: ふわふわ麗香)	November 22, 2021
8	"Gandharva in the deep sea" Transliteration: "Shinkai no Gandaruva" (Japanese: 深海のガンダルヴァ)	November 29, 2021
9	Transliteration: "Asena kara no Tsūshin" (Japanese: アセナからの通信)	December 6, 2021
10	Transliteration: "Reika to Reiu Daisekihan Kōbōsen" (Japanese: 麗香と麗雨・大赤斑攻防戦)	December 13, 2021
11	"Black Earth"; Transliteration: "Kuroi Chikyū" (Japanese: 黒い地球)	December 20, 2021
12	"Elpis - Last Hope"; Transliteration: "Erupisu Saigo no Kibō" (Japanese: エルピス――最後の希望)	December 27, 2021
