= I Don't Like You at All, Big Brother!! =

Japanese manga and anime series

- Japanese cover of Oniichan no Koto Nanka Zenzen Suki Janain Dakara ne!! featuring Nao Takanashi

お兄ちゃんのことなんかぜんぜん好きじゃないんだからねっ!! (Oniichan no Koto Nanka Zenzen Suki Janain Dakara ne!!)
- Genre: Romantic comedy, harem
- Manga
- Written by: Kouichi Kusano
- Published by: Futabasha
- English publisher: NA: Seven Seas Entertainment
- Magazine: Web Comic High!
- Original run: August 29, 2008 – September 16, 2016
- Volumes: 12
- Anime television series
- Directed by: Keitaro Motonaga
- Written by: Sayuri Ooba
- Music by: Tomoki Kikuya
- Studio: Zexcs
- Licensed by: NA: Media Blasters
- Original network: Chiba TV
- Original run: January 9, 2011 – March 27, 2011
- Episodes: 12

I Don't Like You at All, Big Brother!! (Japanese: お兄ちゃんのことなんかぜんぜん好きじゃないんだからねっ!!, Hepburn: Oniichan no Koto Nanka Zenzen Suki Janain Dakara ne!!; literally: "It's because I Don't Like Big Brother at all, isn't it!!") (referred to as "OniSuki" for short) is a Japanese seinen manga series written and illustrated by Kouichi Kusano which was serialized on Futabasha's Web Comic High! service from August 2008 to September 2016. It has been licensed in North America by Seven Seas Entertainment. It has been adapted by Zexcs into an anime series which aired in Japan between January 9, 2011, and March 27, 2011. An additional original video animation (OVA) episode has also been released. A character song CD and a mini-CD soundtrack was adapted from the anime.

== Plot ==
Nao Takanashi loves her brother Shūsuke despite the incest taboo. Nao thinks that Shūsuke is her blood relative, but in fact she is an adopted daughter, whose parents have died. After Nao learns the fact, she wants to fall in love normally with Shūsuke because siblings by adoption can marry under the family law in Japan. However, she finds herself competing with Shūsuke's childhood friend, Iroha Tsuchiura, and his class president and yaoi lover, Mayuka Kondō.

== Characters ==
=== Main ===
Nao Takanashi (高梨 奈緒, Takanashi Nao)
Voiced by: Eri Kitamura
Nao is the adopted daughter of the Takanashi family and secretly loves her foster brother Shūsuke, going as far as to know everything about him to an obsessive degree. Ten years ago, she was in a car accident which killed her parents and caused her to lose her memory, and she has only recently learned the truth. She goes to various lengths to try to attract Shūsuke attention including throwing out his non-incest porn. She becomes particularly annoyed with other girls who try to get close to him. Her real name is never mentioned, and her current name is the same as her deceased biological mother.
Shūsuke Takanashi (高梨 修輔, Takanashi Shūsuke)
Voiced by: Toshiyuki Toyonaga / Hiromi Igarashi (Child)
Shūsuke is the son of the Takanashi family. He is rather perverted, owns a large number of porn magazines and is always looking for panty shot opportunities. Recently he has started using the term "not betraying Nao" implying he loves her, or at least wishes to have her see him as a good older brother. He does admit to having some romantic interest in Nao. He is not aware of Nao's knowledge of either the truth about their relationship or the fact she knows about all his dirty habits. He is a heavy sleeper and Nao has to wake him up for school, not that she minds because it allows her the opportunity to do things she normally wouldn't if he was awake, in short this is when she shows her true self.
Iroha Tsuchiura (土浦 彩葉, Tsuchiura Iroha)
Voiced by: Marina Inoue
Iroha is Shūsuke's childhood friend from before Nao's adoption. Having played 'doctor' with him a lot as a child (which was Shūsuke's excuse to see her naked), she claims to be Shūsuke's lover and constantly makes advances towards him. She is also something of a stalker, watching him in his house through a telescope and using night vision goggles to stalk him. She is even called a "Genuine Stalker" due to her very detailed reports of Shūsuke's late night actions and activities. She is in constant competition with Nao over Shūsuke's affections, though they occasionally work together when someone else catches his eye. Oddly, despite the fact she has openly stated she is willing to have sex with Shūsuke, and even initiating the first move, he seems to not want this. It is hinted this may be due to his believing that his actions made her this way.
Mayuka Kondō (近藤 繭佳, Kondō Mayuka)
Voiced by: Kazusa Aranami
Shūsuke's classmate and class president, with a strong interest in Boy's Love magazines. When Shūsuke tears up one of her magazines by accident, she makes him her 'pet'. She forces him to purchase and review explicit BL magazines which she interprets as having a shared interest. Despite Shūsuke's belief that she may ask him to do something more perverted at some point, she treats him more as a boyfriend - making him bentos and coming to wake him up in time for school. Over time her feelings for Shūsuke increase because of his apparent acceptance of her BL magazines. She becomes attracted to Shūsuke's pink and sensitive nipples due to the fact she has never seen a naked man before, though despite him being her pet, she doesn't use this to her advantage. Although she confesses that she has feelings of wanting to dominate Shūsuke, she loses memory of the incident after being hit by a truck.

=== Others ===
Keiichirō Kishikawa (岸川啓一郎, Kishikawa Keiichirō), Takumi Yamashiro (山代拓実, Yamashiro Takumi) and Daigo Kurosaki (黒崎大吾, Kurosaki Daigo)
Voiced by: Shinnosuke Tachibana, Kenta Matsumoto and Mitsuhiro Ichiki
Collectively known as the A.G.E. Explorers (AGE探検隊, All Genre Ero Tankentai), they are Shūsuke's friends who together constantly seek out and share erotic materials of all kinds. In the anime, it is implied that Keiichirō may have homosexual feelings towards Shūsuke, though this is only his delusion due to the trauma he has developed by being forced to read BL books.
Shūji Takanashi (高梨 修司, Takanashi Shūji)
Voiced by: Hideki Ogihara
Shūji is Shūsuke's father from whom he seems to have inherited his perverted nature. He took Nanaka to a porn movie on their first date and later attempts to 'confiscate' one of his son's magazines.
Nanaka Takanashi (高梨 菜々香, Takanashi Nanaka)
Voiced by: Sayaka Ohara
Nanaka is Shūsuke's mother who always sees her son as a perverted child.
Hirono Kusuhara (楠原 尋乃, Kusuhara Hirono)
Voiced by: Ryoko Shiraishi
Hirono is Nao's friend who questions why both Iroha and Nao love Shusuke.
Haruka Katō (加藤 春華, Katō Haruka)
Voiced by: Eriko Nakamura
Haruka is Nao's friend.
Shizuru (静留)
Voiced by: MAKO
A fictional character from a little sister-themed eroge that Shūsuke has and who often shows up in his perverted dreams, usually those brought on by near death experiences.
Richika Matsuhiro (松代 莉智香, Matsuhiro Richika)
A home tutor hired to help Shūsuke study for his exams. Her methods are a bit extreme, as she enforces a limit on Shūsuke's masturbation to get him to focus on his studies. She appears to have feelings for her own brother.

=== Anime original characters ===
Ran Yatagai (谷田貝 蘭, Yatagai Ran)
Voiced by: Minori Chihara
She is a cosplayer who goes under the alias 'Princess Leila' and is very into her roleplay, suggesting she has a very loose grasp of reality. She seemingly makes a move on Shūsuke, dubbing him 'her saviour', and puts him through many strange trials, which are later revealed to train him to act out a warrior role in a cosplay event.
Rin Yatagai (谷田貝 凛, Yatagai Rin)
Voiced by: Rina Satō
Ran's older twin sister. She is often annoyed by her sister, who often calls her 'Clone'. Although she initially appears to help Nao stop Ran's crazy plans, it is later revealed that she is a lesbian who has become interested in Nao's lips as well as seems to have a harem of girls after her attention. In the end, she accidentally kisses Iroha and takes a liking to her instead.

== Media ==
=== Manga ===
The original manga, written and illustrated by Kouichi Kusano, began serialization on Futabasha's Web Comic High! service from August 29, 2008. The serialization finished on September 16, 2016, with a total of twelve released volumes. Seven Seas Entertainment released the manga in North America from August 2012 to March 2019.

=== Audio CDs ===
A character song CD, entitled Oniichan no Koto Nanka Zenzen Suki Janain Dakara ne!! Character Songs - Uta Nanka Zenzen Uta Itakunain Dakara ne!! (「お兄ちゃんのことなんかぜんぜん好きじゃないんだからねっ!!」キャラクターソング 歌なんかぜんぜん歌いたくないんだからねっ!!), was released on March 13, 2011, by Starchild Records. The CD contains one disc consisting of eleven different short tracks, and the disc length in entirety is five minutes and thirty nine seconds. Also, the Oniichan no Koto Nanka Zenzen Suki Janain Dakara ne!! DVD comprising all twelve episodes of the anime also includes a bonus CD containing the opening and ending theme songs, and their off vocal versions.

=== Anime ===
Oniichan no Koto Nanka Zenzen Suki Janain Dakara ne!! has been adapted by Zexcs into a 12-episode anime television series, which aired in Japan on Chiba TV network between January 9, 2011, and March 27, 2011. The television airing includes many censor bars obscuring dozens of panty shot scenes in each episode in the shape of the penguin and cat mascots for the show, which are removed for the Blu-ray versions of the episodes. The anime was directed by Keitaro Motonaga.

An additional OVA episode was included on the final Blu-ray volume, released on July 13, 2011. The opening theme is "Taste of Paradise" by Eri Kitamura while the ending theme is "Ari Ari Future" (アリアリ未来, Ari Ari Mirai) by Kitamura, Marina Inoue and Kazusa Aranami.

==== Episode list ====
No.	Title	Original release date
1	"Wicked Usual Day of a Brother and Sister"; Transliteration: "Ani to Imōto no Yokoshima na Nichijō" (Japanese: 兄と妹のヨコシマな日常)	January 9, 2011
Nao Takanashi has long been trying to tempt her brother, Shūsuke, into entering an immoral (i.e. incest) relationship with her, with Shūsuke barely being able to resist. Nao goes to great lengths for Shūsuke to think of her perversely by doing things such as letting him purposely look underneath her skirt (and once letting him see her completely naked) but then she always gets him into trouble afterward so as to make it look like Shūsuke is the immoral pervert. One day, while Nao searches through Shūsuke's room for his collection of porn magazines, she then finds a hidden family photo album and is surprised to find out that there are no childhood pictures of her in it. After Shūsuke was finished being scolded about his porn collection, Nao confronts her parents, Shūji and Nanaka, about the album. They then tell her the truth: 10 years prior to the story, a car accident killed Nao's real parents and left Nao with memory loss, so Shūsuke insisted that Shūji and Nanaka adopt her into their family where he vowed to care & look after her as his sister. Nao is more shocked by the fact she and Shūsuke are not actually blood related. At that instance, Nao realizes that a possible intimate relationship with him would be acceptable. Nao then requests Shūji and Nanaka to keep the fact she learned the truth from Shūsuke so that they can retain their sibling status.
2	"Twintail, Attacking Brother and Sister"; Transliteration: "Tsuintēru, Kyōdai o Shūgeki" (Japanese: ツインテール、兄妹を襲撃)	January 16, 2011
Nao briefly spots a twin-tailed girl, similar to what appeared in Shūsuke's photo album. At school that day, a girl named Iroha Tsuchiura joins Nao's class and makes friends with Nao. Iroha later comes to Shūsuke, reintroducing herself as his childhood friend and kisses him, proclaiming they are lovers due to games of Doctor they played when they were young. Shūsuke feels ashamed of his past perversion, throwing away all his porn and his perverted nature, which causes Nao to grow concerned. Meanwhile, Shūsuke becomes increasingly worried that Iroha seems to know everything about his private life, and later she blackmails him with threats of telling Nao about their games of Doctor.
3	"A Rival Appears! Brother and Sister in Trouble"; Transliteration: "Raibaru Shutsugen! Kyōdai Daipinchi!" (Japanese: ライバル出現! 兄妹大ピンチ!)	January 24, 2011
Iroha coerces Shūsuke into going on a date with her, and Nao decides to follow them, while her friends, Haruka and Hirono, decide to tail her as well. Iroha takes Shūsuke various places including a movie theater, an arcade and a swimsuit store. At the end of the date, Iroha tries to get Shūsuke to kiss her, but he refuses. Iroha tries to drag him somewhere else, but Nao manages to bail him out. Nao begins treating Shūsuke coldly, leading him to realize that she knew about his date with Iroha. When Iroha scares Shūsuke with the notion that she knows everything he's been doing (having been watching him through a telescope), Shūsuke rolls on the floor when Nao enters, getting a look at her panties which reawakens his normal perversion, much to Nao's delight.
4	"If My Little Sister Wore a Swimsuit"; Transliteration: "Imōto ga Mizugi ni Kigaetara" (Japanese: 妹が水着にきがえたら)	January 31, 2011
Nao coerces Shūsuke into going to the beach with her, though coincidentally they end up running into Haruka, Hirono and Iroha, who Nao recognizes as the pigtailed girl from Shūsuke's childhood photos. Nao and Iroha end up competing with each other for Shūsuke's attention, though it tends to just bring him pain. Nao accidentally knocks him unconscious with a rented boat, and he dreams of his favorite eroge character. Nao and Iroha compete with each other over who gets to perform mouth to mouth resuscitation, though in the end, he is revived by one of his male friends.
5	"Mr. X Strikes Brother!"; Transliteration: "Misutā Ekkusu Ani Shū!" (Japanese: ミスターX 兄襲!)	February 6, 2011
While running back from buying a new porno magazine, Shūsuke bumps into another person. They get their packages mixed up and Shūsuke ends up with a Boy's Love magazine that he immediately rips to shreds. When the other party, known as Mister X, discovers about the mix up, he sends Shūsuke a threatening note demanding its return. That night, when Shūsuke attempts to make an exchange with Mister X using a different BL magazine, with Nao and Iroha stalking him, he learns Mister X's true identity is that of his class rep, Mayuka Kondō. With the threat of his porn being shredded or shown to Nao, Shūsuke agrees to become Mayuka's pet, assuming there will be sexual requests involved. The requests start simple, such as buying her a drink or trying her bentō lunch. However, the next evening, Mayuka asks Shūsuke to buy her a more extreme BL magazine she's too embarrassed to buy herself.
6	"Brother Dreams of Black Pantyhose"; Transliteration: "Ani wa Kuro Pansuto no Yume o Miru" (Japanese: 兄は黒パンストの夢を見る)	February 13, 2011
After having Iroha spy on Shūsuke and Mayuka the previous night, Nao tries putting on black pantyhose and clinging onto Shūsuke as he sleeps. Iroha and Mayuka later arrive, leading to an awkward confrontation. Mayuka ends up questioning what Nao and Iroha see in a pervert like Shūsuke, mentioning her affection towards him is different from theirs. Later that night, Mayuka gets Shūsuke to read through one of her BL books, which ends up traumatizing him.
7	"Brother and Friends' Akiba"; Transliteration: "Anitachi no AKIBA" (Japanese: 兄たちのAKIBA)	February 20, 2011
Shūsuke and his friends go on a trip to Akihabara in search of adult goods while Nao and Iroha decide to follow them. After visiting an adult DVD store, the group gets into an argument about their desired fetishes and break off in search of them, leaving Shūsuke alone. However, they soon come to apologize to each other and go to a maid café holding a 'little-sister' service.
8	"Aim for Brother's Top!"; Transliteration: "Ani no Toppu o Nerae!" (Japanese: 兄のトップをねらえ!)	February 27, 2011
When Shūsuke gets a report about him failing in all of his subjects, he then realizes that he has to take a follow-up exam or risk having to take summer classes. Believing that she was the cause of Shūsuke's grade for calling him out each night, Mayuka feels guilty and offers to help him study for an upcoming exam. But while they were studying, Nao and Iroha decide to intrude on them. As Mayuka tries to get Shūsuke to study, Nao and Iroha compete to try and catch his attention. After some time later, Iroha presents surprise tickets for everyone to go to a local pool park if he passed, which encourages Shūsuke enough to pass. At the pool, Shūsuke spends most of his time teaching Mayuka how to swim, leaving Nao and Iroha pretty jealous. During that time, Mayuka becomes amorously focused with Shusuke's nipples, having never seen a man naked before. As Nao tries to press Mayuka on her attraction to Shūsuke, he nearly drowns after Iroha forces him on a water slide, but is revived thanks to Mayuka's 'cardiac massage'. Afterwards, Mayuka leaves Shūsuke a large list of BL books to buy while she is on holiday.
9	"Summer! Festivals! Brother and Sister's M:i:V"; Transliteration: "Natsu Da! Matsuri Da! Kyōdai no Emu Ai Vī" (Japanese: 夏だ! 祭りだ! 兄妹のM:i:V)	March 6, 2011
Shūsuke goes to a Matsuri festival with Nao and Iroha, who compete with each other to try and seduce him. Meanwhile, the A.G.E Explorers go on a quest to find a legendary pornographic treasure and proceed to drag Shūsuke away to join them. However, the treasure they find contains zoophillic porn that proves too intense for them and they run away, with Shūsuke picking up Nao in tow. After watching the fireworks with Nao, Shūsuke goes to deliver some BL books to Mayuka, who once again becomes enthralled by his nipples.
10	"Brother Saves the World"; Transliteration: "Ani wa Sekai o Sukū" (Japanese: 兄は世界を救う)	March 13, 2011
Late on night, Shūsuke spots a sexy cosplayer named Ran Yatagai on top of a vending machine. He later sees Ran, who calls herself Princess Leila, at school the next day, who invites him and his friends to the rooftop. She claims to be seeking a saviour amongst the scum of the Earth in order to defend it, with Shūsuke and friends believe to be initiation for some kind of underground club. As Nao and Iroha decide to follow her, they meet her twin sister, Rin, who reveals Ran is using her own peculiar method to find a partner. While Rin manages to scare off the other AGE explorers, Shūsuke goes alone to an 'awakening ceremony'. Shūsuke is scared off by Nao's presence and runs off with Ran, who decides he is her saviour. Meanwhile, Rin appears and shows romantic interest in Nao, now that Ran is preoccupied. *Reruns of this episode were cancelled due to the 2011 Tōhoku earthquake and tsunami, as the episode features a scene in which characters are swept away by an imaginary wave
11	"Calling out to my Brother from the Center of the World"; Transliteration: "Sekai no Chūshin de Ani o Sakebu" (Japanese: 世界の中心で兄を叫ぶ)	March 20, 2011
As Shūsuke puts up with more of Ran's dubious rituals, Rin forces Nao to hang out with her by threatening to tell Shūsuke that she had been stalking him, looking for an opportunity to kiss her. Shūsuke and Nao soon become paranoid around each other when they see each other hanging around the respective Yatagai sister. Nao and Iroha determine that the only way to get Rin off her back is to convince Ran that Shūsuke isn't her saviour by pretending to be prophets on their mobile phones. Rin catches onto their plan and tries to get the drop on Nao but ends up kissing Iroha instead, though she immediately takes a liking to her lips and runs off with her. Ran later explains to Nao that she wanted to mentally train Shūsuke to play as a warrior for a cosplay event, though when the day of the event arrives, Shūsuke gets the address wrong and arrested for wearing his skimpy outfit in public.
12	"I Don't Like My Brother At All!"; Transliteration: "Oniichan no Koto Nanka Zenzen Suki Janain Dakara ne!!" (Japanese: お兄ちゃんのことなんかぜんぜん好きじゃないんだからねっ!!)	March 27, 2011
Shusuke and Nao are left alone in the house when their parents go on an overnight trip. Nao takes the opportunity to try and seduce Shusuke by wearing a maid's outfit as he tries to prepare dinner. After washing up after a little accident in the kitchen, the two become paranoid when Nao starts hearing strange panting, which turns out to be the AGE Explorers, who invite Shusuke out on an unsuccessful search for porn, which gives him a cold. As Nao tends to it, Iroha and Mayuka pay a visit, which once again turns into a battle for his attention.

==== OVA ====
No.	Title	Original release date
1	"Little Sister's Diary of Brother's Perverted Habits"; Transliteration: "Imōto Yori Ai wo Komete Ani no "Seitai Kanatsuki"" (Japanese: 妹より愛をこめて 兄の『性態観察記』)	July 16, 2011
Nao looks over her 'Big Brother's Perverted Habits Diary', looking over Shusuke's misfortune with seeking out various porn.
