= Battle Girl High School =

Japanese mobile game & anime television series

- Battle Girl High School Flora

バトルガール ハイスクール (Batorugāru Haisukūru)
- Genre: Musical
- Video game
- Developer: COLOPL
- Publisher: JP: COLOPL; TW: So-net TW
- Engine: Unity 4, Live2D
- Platform: iOS, Android
- Released: JP: April 16, 2015; TW: November 30, 2015
- Anime television series
- Directed by: Noriaki Akitaya; Kazuo Miyake
- Produced by: Tomoki Numata; Shigeaki Komatsu; Hiroshi Yoshida; Satoshi Fukao
- Written by: Yōsuke Kuroda
- Music by: Kz
- Studio: Silver Link
- Licensed by: NA: Sentai Filmworks; UK: MVM Films
- Original network: Tokyo MX, BS11, KTV, AT-X
- Original run: July 2, 2017 – September 17, 2017
- Episodes: 12

Battle Girl High School (バトルガール ハイスクール, Batoru Gāru Hai Sukūru) was a Japanese science fantasy social network game developed and published by COLOPL. It was released in Japan on April 16, 2015. An anime adaptation was green-lit to celebrate the one year anniversary of the game. The anime adaptation, which was later revealed to be a television series, aired in Japan from July 2 to September 17, 2017. Crunchyroll added Battle Girl High School to its catalog on November 11, 2018.

The game ended service on July 31, 2019.

== Characters ==
=== Shinjugamine Jogakuen ===
Freshmen

Miki Hoshitsuki (星月 みき, Hoshitsuki Miki)
Voiced by: Aya Suzaki
Miki is the series' cheerful and energetic protagonist.
Subaru Wakaba (若葉 昴, Wakaba Subaru)
Voiced by: Ayane Sakura
Subaru is a sporty and lively girl whose family owns the Ashitaba Zaibatsu. Despite her tomboyish aura, she has a hidden girly side and wishes to be feminine.
Haruka Narumi (成海 遥香, Narumi Haruka)
Voiced by: Sora Amamiya
Haruka is the calm and gentle, yet tone-deaf girl. The daughter of doctors, she dreams of taking over her parents' clinic someday.
Misaki (ミサキ)
Voiced by: Rie Takahashi
Misaki is a strict girl with a mysterious aura and a high ability as a star guard.

==== Sophomores ====
Nozomi Amano (天野 望, Amano Nozomi)
Voiced by: Nao Tōyama
Nozomi is an aspiring fashion designer with a gorgeous and flashy fashion sense. Inheriting this dream from her mother, she plans to launch her own clothing brand.
Yuri Himukai (火向井 ゆり, Himukai Yuri)
Voiced by: Sumire Uesaka
Yuri is a member of the student council with a strong sense of justice. She has a complex of her short height and small breasts.
Kurumi Tokiwa (常盤 くるみ, Tokiwa Kurumi)
Voiced by: Saori Hayami
Kurumi is a member of the Chemistry Research Department whose father works as a botanist. She is bad at handling her emotions, but takes great care of her loved ones and has a habit of talking to plants.
Kanon Kougami (煌上 花音, Kōgami Kanon)
Voiced by: Kaede Hondo
Kanon is a tsundere girl who was initially strict with people, but slowly opens her heart.
Shiho Kunieda (国枝 詩穂, Kunieda Shiho)
Voiced by: Shino Shimoji
Shiho is an elusive girl with excellent singing abilities.

==== Third-year students ====
Anko Tsubuzaki (粒咲 あんこ, Tsubuzaki Anko)
Voiced by: Yumi Uchiyama
Anko is a computer nerd who is bad at talking directly to people, including family members, but good at chatting and sending e-mails. She has a sporadic schedule and sometimes gets up at 7pm on her days off.
Renge Serizawa (芹沢 蓮華, Serizawa Renge)
Voiced by: Yoshino Nanjo
Renge is a member of the rhythmic gymnastics club who speaks in third-person. She has a soft spot for cute girls and knows about skincare.
Asuha Kusunoki (楠 明日葉, Kusunoki Asuha)
Voiced by: Mutsumi Tamura
The daughter of the Kusunoki family, Asuha is student council president with a serious personality. She has an older brother named Hayato.

==== Junior high school students ====
Sakura Fujimiya (藤宮 桜, Fujimiya Sakura)
Voiced by: Misaki Kuno
Sakura is a member of the shogi club with a posh accent due to the influence of her grandfather, who has been with her since she was a child.
Hinata Minami (南 ひなた, Minami Hinata)
Voiced by: Hiromi Igarashi
Hinata is an energetic and friendly member of the softball club with a single-minded strength. She gets along well with Sakura, who is the polar-opposite of her.
Sadone Sendoin (サドネ, Sendōin Sadone)
Voiced by: Aoi Yuki
Sadone is the lonely member of the Sof tribe.

==== Junior high school sophomore ====
Kaede Sendoin (千導院 楓, Sendōin Kaede)
Voiced by: Ibuki Kido
Kaede is a descendant of the nobility who speaks in a posh accent. She has been studying imperial studies since a childhood and respects her family. Kaede also has a deep knowledge of art and likes impressionist paintings, but has a terrible painting skill.
Michelle Watagi (綿木 ミシェル, Watagi Misheru)
Voiced by: Emiri Kato
Michelle is a member of the handicraft club. With a friendly personality and love of fancy things, she is described as her class' mascot.

==== Junior high school third grade ====
Kokomi Asahina (朝比奈 心美, Asahina Kokomi)
Voiced by: Hitomi Harada
Kokomi is the gentle and timid member of the astronomical club. She suffered from androphobia, being bad at talking to men other than her father, and is reluctant. Wanting to overcome this, Kokomi normally makes a wish to find a shooting star to correct such a personality.
Urara Hasumi (蓮見 うらら, Hasumi Urara)
Voiced by: Maaya Uchida
Urara is the bright and energetic member of the swimming club with a love of the idol world. She sees Kokomi as a rival and is jealous of her big breasts.

==== Teachers ====
Itsuki Yakumo (八雲 樹, Yakumo Itsuki)
Voiced by: Noriko Hidaka
Furan Mitsurugi (御剣 風蘭, Mitsurugi Fūran)
Voiced by: Ayaka Fukuhara
Botan Kamine (神峰 牡丹, Kamine Botan)
Voiced by: Ari Ozawa
Teacher (先生, Sensei)
Voiced by: Tomokazu Sugita (anime)

==== Teachers ====
Aoi Nanashima (七嶋 葵, Nanashima Aoi)
Voiced by: Shizuka Ito

== Anime ==
An anime television series aired from July 2 to September 17, 2017. It is directed by Noriaki Akitaya at studio Silver Link, with scripts written by Yōsuke Kuroda and character design by Shūhei Yamamoto and Hideki Furukawa.

No.	Title (Note: All English titles are taken from Hidive.)	Original release date
1	"We Can Do It!" "Watashi-tachi Ganbarimasu!" (Japanese: 私たちガンバリます！)	July 2, 2017
2	"Is That What Gets You?" "Soko ga Tsubo nano?" (Japanese: そこがツボなの？)	July 9, 2017
3	"Resort × Retreat × Escape" "Rizōto × Gasshuku × Esukēpu" (Japanese: リゾート×合宿×エスケープ)	July 16, 2017
4	"Songs with Emotion" "Uta ni Omoi o" (Japanese: 歌に想いを)	July 23, 2017
5	"The Flower Language of the Iris" "Airisu no Hanakotoba" (Japanese: アイリスの花言葉)	July 30, 2017
6	"Renge is Kurumi, Kurumi is Renge" "Renge ga Kurumi desu Kurumi ga Renge" (Japanese: れんげがくるみですくるみがれんげ)	August 6, 2017
7	"Protective Power" "Mamoru Chikara" (Japanese: 守るカ)	August 13, 2017
8	"Hoshimori Down Time" "Hoshimori-tachi no Kyūjitsu" (Japanese: 星守たちの休日)	August 20, 2017
9	"Holy Tree Festival" "Kami Itsuki-sai" (Japanese: 神樹祭)	August 27, 2017
10	"Family" "Kazoku" (Japanese: 家族)	September 3, 2017
11	"Truth" "Shinjitsu" (Japanese: 真実)	September 10, 2017
12	"Bonds" "Kizuna" (Japanese: きずな)	September 17, 2017
