= Eri Kitamura =

Japanese voice actress and singer (born 1987)

- 喜多村 英梨
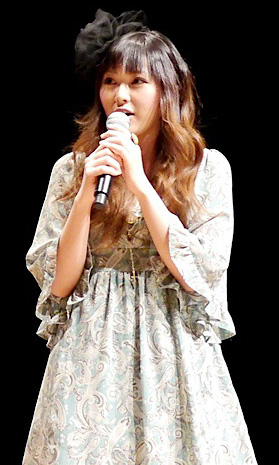
- Kitamura performing in 2011
- Born: August 16, 1987 (age 39); Fuchū, Tokyo, Japan
- Occupations: Voice actress; singer
- Years active: 2003–present
- Musical career
- Genres: Rock; symphonic rock; symphonic metal; pop rock (early)
- Instrument: Vocals
- Years active: 2004–present
- Label: TMS Music
- Website: erikitamura.com

Eri Kitamura (喜多村 英梨, Kitamura Eri; born August 16, 1987) is a Japanese voice actress and singer. She was previously affiliated with Early Wing, but is now a freelancer. She is known for voicing prominent roles in anime and games such as Sayaka Miki in Puella Magi Madoka Magica, Saya Otonashi in Blood+, Keqing in Genshin Impact, Shizuku in New Game!, Darjeeling in Girls und Panzer, Uni/Black Sister in Hyperdimension Neptunia, Ranko Honjō in My First Girlfriend Is a Gal, Yuka Mochida in Corpse Party, Izumo Kamiki in Blue Exorcist, Bea in Pokémon: Twilight Wings, and Miki Aono/Cure Berry in Fresh Pretty Cure!. In addition, she provided the voice for the Vocaloid voicebank CUL. She is known to be an amateur manga artist in Japan in her spare time.

== Filmography ==
=== Television animation ===
Year	Title	Role
2003	Last Exile	Tatiana Wisla
2004	Mermaid Melody Pichi Pichi Pitch Pure	Seira, Anime OP singer ("Before The Moment")
2005	Blood+	Saya Otonashi
2006	Le Chevalier D'Eon	Anna Rochefort
2006	Night Head Genesis	Yoshimi Taniguchi
2006	Simoun	Amuria
2007	Idolmaster: Xenoglossia	Makoto Kikuchi
2007	Ikki Tousen: Dragon Destiny	Kakouen Myousai
2007	Hell Girl: Two Mirrors	Juri Moriuchi
2007	Kaze no Stigma	Michael Harley
2007	Onegai My Melody: Sukkiri	Marisa Tomeka
2007	Kodomo no Jikan	Rin Kokonoe
2007	Minami-ke	Yuka Uchida
2007	Potemayo	Sunao Moriyama
2007	My Bride Is a Mermaid	Akeno Shiranui
2007	Tōka Gettan	Makoto Inukai
2007	You're Under Arrest!	Yukari
2008	Amatsuki	Yakou
2008	Blassreiter	Lene Clavier
2008	Chaos;Head	Rimi Sakihata
2008	Ga-rei -Zero-	Natsuki Kasuga
2008	Ikki Tousen: Great Guardians	Kakouen Myousai
2008	Hell Girl: Three Vessels	Nishino Chizuru
2008	Kemeko Deluxe!	Sanpeita Kobayashi
2008	Kyōran Kazoku Nikki	Akeru Nishikura
2008	Minami-ke: Okawari	Yuka Uchida
2008	Nogizaka Haruka no Himitsu	Ryōko Sawamura
2008	Noramimi	Cinnamon
2008	Persona: Trinity Soul	Takurō Sakakiba's father
2008	Shigofumi: Letters from the Departed	Ran Yahiro
2008	Toradora!	Ami Kawashima
2008	Vampire Knight	Rima Tōya
2008	Vampire Knight Guilty	Rima Tōya
2008	Yatterman	Horita
2009	Asura Cryin'	Rikka Kurasawa
2009	Asura Cryin' 2	Rikka Kurasawa
2009	Bakemonogatari	Karen Araragi
2009	Fairy Tail	Cana Alberona, Aquarius
2009	Fresh Pretty Cure!	Miki Aono/Cure Berry
2009	Kanamemo	Hinata Azuma
2009	Kurokami: The Animation	Kakuma
2009	Minami-ke: Okaeri	Yuka Uchida
2009	NEEDLESS	Eve Neuschwanstein
2009	Nogizaka Haruka no Himitsu: Purezza	Ryōko Sawamura
2009	Sora Kake Girl	Lily
2009	Umineko no Naku Koro ni	Chiester 410
2009	Taishō Baseball Girls	Shizuka Tsukubae
2009	Tegami Bachi	Ann
2009	Tokyo Magnitude 8.0	Mayu
2009	Yumeiro Patissiere	Mari Tennōji, Honey
2010	Angel Beats!	Yui
2010	Beyblade: Metal Masters	Sophie
2010	Dance in the Vampire Bund	Nelly
2010	Durarara!!	Mairu Orihara
2010	Highschool of the Dead	Saya Takagi
2010	Kuragehime	Sara
2010	Queen's Blade: The Exiled Virgin	Alleyne
2010	Queen's Blade 2: The Evil Eye	Alleyne
2010	So Ra No Wo To	Kureha Suminoya
2010	Shiki	Yoshie Kurahashi
2010	Working!!	Yachiyo Todoroki
2010	Yumeiro Patissiere SP Professional	Mari Tennōji, Honey
2011	30-sai no Hoken Taiiku	Pī-chan, Kū-chan
2011	Ao no Exorcist	Izumo Kamiki
2011	C³	Kirika Ueno
2011	Freezing	Ganessa Roland
2011	Mayo Chiki!	Kanade Suzutsuki
2011	Oniichan no Koto Nanka Zenzen Suki Janain Dakara ne!!	Nao Takanashi
2011	Puella Magi Madoka Magica	Sayaka Miki, Anime ED singer ("and I'm Home")
2011	Softenni	Kotone Sawanatsu
2011	Last Exile: Fam, The Silver Wing	Tatiana Wisla
2011	Rio: Rainbow Gate!	Misery
2011	Sket Dance	Quecchon
2011	Working'!!	Yachiyo Todoroki
2012	Black Rock Shooter	Kagari Izuriha
2012	Campione!	Liliana Kranjčar
2012	Danball Senki W	Jessica Kaios
2012	Dog Days'	Adélaïde Grand Marnier
2012	Girls und Panzer	Darjeeling, Tsuchiya, Taiga Ou, Pravda High School Flag Tank Captain
2012	Haiyore! Nyaruko-san	Mahiro Yasaka
2012	Nisemonogatari	Karen Araragi
2012	Nekomonogatari (Kuro)	Karen Araragi
2012	Oniichan dakedo Ai sae Areba Kankeinai yo ne!	Arashi Nikaidō
2012	Listen to Me, Girls. I Am Your Father!	Miu Takanashi
2012	Pocket Monsters: Best Wishes!	Roxie
2012	Tasogare Otome x Amnesia	Kirie Kanoe
2013	Gen'ei o Kakeru Taiyō	Seira Hoshikawa
2013	Haiyore! Nyaruko-san W	Mahiro Yasaka
2013	Hyperdimension Neptunia: The Animation	Uni / Black Sister
2013	Sunday Without God	Dee Ensy Stratmitos
2013	Karneval	Kiichi
2013	Mangirl!	Hikari Ayano
2013	Minami-ke: Tadaima	Yuka Uchida
2013	Monogatari Series 2nd Season	Karen Araragi
2013	Senran Kagura	Homura
2013	Teekyu 3	Annenkov Kondo
2013	Zettai Bōei Leviathan	Bahamut
2013	Tokyo Ravens	Kyōko Kurahashi
2014	Knights of Sidonia	Honoka Sisters
2014	Hamatora	Honey
2014	Fairy Tail	Cana Alberona
2014	Broken Blade	Leto
2014	Hōzuki no Reitetsu	Okō
2014	Re: Hamatora	Honey
2014	Cross Ange	Salia Tereshkova
2014	Tokyo ESP	Natsuki Kasuga
2014	Shingeki no Bahamut Genesis	Cerberus
2014	Magic Kaito 1412	Koizumi Akako
2015	Aoharu x Machinegun	Ichi Akabane
2015	Durarara!!x2 Shou	Mairu Orihara
2015	Magical Girl Lyrical Nanoha ViVid	Rio Wezley
2015	Teekyu 6	Annenkov Kondo
2015	Working!!!	Yachiyo Todoroki
2015	Yamada-kun and the Seven Witches	Nene Odagiri
2015	Yoru no Yatterman	Doronjo
2016	My Hero Academia	Mina Ashido, Tenya Iida's Mother
2016	Kuma Miko: Girl Meets Bear	Hibiki Sakata
2016	Ojisan to Marshmallow	Iori Wakabayashi
2016	Taboo Tattoo	Lisa Lovelock
2016	Time Bokan 24	Bimajo
2016	Rewrite	Akane Senri
2016	New Game!	Shizuku Hazuki
2016	ViVid Strike!	Rio Wesley
2017	Cardfight!! Vanguard G NEXT	Noa Hoshizaki
2017	Akashic Records of Bastard Magic Instructor	Celica Arfonia
2017	Seven Mortal Sins	Pride Demon Lord Lucifer
2017	Armed Girl's Machiavellism	Koharu Narukami
2017	New Game!!	Shizuku Hazuki, Mozuku
2017	My First Girlfriend Is a Gal	Ranko Honjō
2017	Love and Lies	Shū Igarashi
2017	Made in Abyss	Mitty
2017	Love Tyrant	Tiara
2017	Love Is Like a Cocktail	Chisato Mizusawa
2018	The Disastrous Life of Saiki K.	Mikoto Aiura (Ep. 8 - )
2018	Tachibanakan To Lie Angle	Sonoa Mitsui
2018	Miss Caretaker of Sunohara-sou	Aki Shiina
2018	Skull-face Bookseller Honda-san	Hōtai (Bandage)
2019	The Helpful Fox Senko-san	Yozora
2019	7 Seeds	Hibari Niigusa
2019	Magical Sempai	Saki-chan
2019	African Office Worker	Shishimura
2020	Sing "Yesterday" for Me	Chika Yuzuhara
2020	Deca-Dence	Kurenai, Pipe
2020	Magia Record: Puella Magi Madoka Magica Side Story	Sayaka Miki
2020	Pokémon: Twilight Wings	Saitō (Bea)
2021	So I'm a Spider, So What?	Fei
2021	Kaginado	Akane Senri
2021	Shaman King	Pascal Avaf
2022	Tokyo 24th Ward	Lucky
2022	Life with an Ordinary Guy Who Reincarnated into a Total Fantasy Knockout	Lucius
2022	Kaginado Season 2	Yui
2022	Call of the Night	Nico Hirata
2022	Phantom of the Idol	Hitomi Shinano
2023	Reborn to Master the Blade: From Hero-King to Extraordinary Squire	Sistia Rouge
2023	Pokémon Horizons: The Series	Nemona
2024	Hokkaido Gals Are Super Adorable!	Mai Fuyuki
2024	Shinkalion: Change the World	Ina Ōnari
2024	Tonbo!	Tsubura Adaniya
2025	Himitsu no AiPri: Ring-hen	Ring Clover
2025	#Compass 2.0: Combat Providence Analysis System	Kirara
2025	A Ninja and an Assassin Under One Roof	Kuro

=== Original video animation (OVA) ===
- Aruvu Rezuru: Kikaijikake no Yōseitachi – Shiki Mikage
- Durarara!! – Mairu Orihara
- Fairy Tail: Welcome to Fairy Hills!! – Cana Alberona, Aquarius
- ICE – Mint
- Indian Summer (2007, OVA) – Yui
- My-Otome 0~S.ifr~ – Sister Hermana Shion
- Princess Resurrection – Riza Wildman
- Super Street Fighter IV OVA – Juri Han
- Corpse Party: Missing Footage – Yuka Mochida
- Corpse Party: Tortured Souls – Yuka Mochida
- Yamada-kun and the Seven Witches (2014, OVA) – Nene Odagiri
- Yasuke, Ishikawa

=== Films ===
- Fresh Pretty Cure: The Toy Kingdom has Many Secrets!? (2009) – Miki Aono/Cure Berry
- Pretty Cure All Stars Movie Series (2009–2023) – Miki Aono/Cure Berry
- Break Blade film series (2010–2011) – Leto
- Ao no Exorcist the Movie (2012) – Izumo Kamiki
- Fairy Tail the Movie: Phoenix Priestess (2012) – Cana Alberona, Aquarius
- Puella Magi Madoka Magica: The Movie film trilogy (2012–2013) – Sayaka Miki
- Puella Magi Madoka Magica: Rebellion (2013, third film) – Sayaka
- Girls und Panzer der Film (2015) - Darjeeling, Tsuchiya
- My Hero Academia: Two Heroes (2018) - Mina Ashido
- My Hero Academia: Heroes Rising - Mina Ashido
- A Whisker Away (2020) - Kinako
- My Hero Academia: You're Next (2024) - Mina Ashido
- Puella Magi Madoka Magica: Walpurgisnacht Rising (2025) – Sayaka Miki

=== Video games ===
- Super Street Fighter IV (2010) – Juri Han
- Senran Kagura Burst (2011) – Homura
- Street Fighter X Tekken (2012) – Juri Han
- Lollipop Chainsaw (2012) – Juliet Starling; as default setting in Xbox 360
- Project X Zone (2012) – Juri Han
- Senran Kagura Shinovi Versus (2013) – Homura
- Super Heroine Chronicle (2014) – Yase
- Senran Kagura 2: Deep Crimson (2014) – Homura
- Senran Kagura: Estival Versus (2015) – Homura
- Project X Zone 2 (2015) – Juri Han
- JoJo's Bizarre Adventure: Eyes of Heaven (2015) – Yasuho Hirose
- Street Fighter V (2016) – Juri Han
- World of Final Fantasy (2016) – Serafie
- Dissidia Final Fantasy Opera Omnia (2017) – Papalymo
- Azur Lane (2018) – IJN Hiei
- Genshin Impact (2020) - Keqing
- Nier Reincarnation (2021) – Akeha
- Alchemy Stars (2021) – Michenny, Wrath
- Goddess of Victory: Nikke (2022) – Liberalio
- Path to Nowhere (2023) – Etti
- Street Fighter 6 (2023) – Juri Han
- Teppen (2025) – Juri Han
- Arknights: Endfield (2026) – Avywenna

Unknown date

- Ar tonelico III – Finnel
- Arknights – Beeswax, Carnelian
- Ash Arms – M41 Bulldog, Ram Mk.I
- Astral Chain – Breanda Moreno
- Atelier Rorona: The Alchemist of Arland – Cordelia von Feuerbach
- Atelier Totori: The Adventurer of Arland – Cordelia von Feuerbach
- Chaos;Head – Rimi Sakihata
- Chaos;Head Love Chu Chu! – Rimi Sakihata
- Corpse Party: BloodCovered: ...Repeated Fear – Yuka Mochida
- Corpse Party: Book of Shadows – Yuka Mochida
- Corpse Party: BloodDrive – Yuka Mochida
- Corpse Party: Sachiko's Game of Love ♥ Hysteric Birthday 2U – Yuka Mochida
- DC Super Hero Girls: Teen Power – Batgirl / Barbara Gordon
- Death End Request – Ripuka
- Dengeki Gakuen RPG: Cross of Venus – Kizuna Kasugai
- Disgaea 4: A Promise Unforgotten – Vulcanus
- Do-Don-Pachi Saidaioujou – Type-B Hikari
- Dragalia Lost – Cerberus, Grace
- Dream Club – Mio
- Final Fantasy XIV: A Realm Reborn – Papalymo
- Girls' Frontline – M21, Stechkin APS
- Girls' Frontline: Project Neural Cloud (2022) – Willow, Vee, Kusiniya
- Graffiti Smash - Salva
- Granblue Fantasy – Cerberus
- Heroes Phantasia – Saya Otonashi
- Hyperdimension Neptunia Mk2 – Uni
- Hyperdimension Neptunia Victory – Uni
- Koumajou Densetsu II: Stranger's Requiem – Remilia Scarlet, Sunny Milk
- Koumajou Remilia: Scarlet Symphony – Remilia Scarlet
- Luminous Arc 3 – Yuu
- Lux-Pain – Nöla Döbereiner
- Magia Record: Puella Magi Madoka Magica Side Story – Sayaka Miki
- Megadimension Neptunia VII – Uni
- Abyss of the Sacrifice – Asuna
- No More Heroes: Heroes' Paradise – Shinobu
- Negai no Kakera to Hakugin no Agreement – Aizawa Makoto
- New Class of Heroes: Chrono Academy – Abner
- Our World is Ended - Asano Hayase
- Phantasy Star Online 2 – Quna
- Pokémon Masters EX – Bea
- Puella Magi Madoka Magica Portable – Sayaka Miki
- Puella Magi Madoka Magica: The Battle Pentagram – Sayaka Miki
- Puyo Puyo Quest - Sayaka Miki
- Rewrite – Akane Senri
- Rune Factory 3 – Collette
- Shinkyoku Soukai Polyphonica – Snow Drop
- Show By Rock!! - Retoree
- SINoALICE - Cinderella
- Tatsunoko vs. Capcom – Gan-chan aka Yatterman No. 1
- Tales of Phantasia: Narikiri Dungeon X – Rondoline E. Effenberg
- Toki to Towa – Towa
- Tokyo Babel – Samael
- Toradora! Portable – Ami Kawashima
- Umineko When They Cry – Chiester 410
- Valkyria Chronicles II – Cosette Coalhearth
- Valkyria Chronicles III – Cosette Coalhearth
- Valkyrie Anatomia - The Origin – Kokuyō
- Venus Eleven Vivid! – Morgan

=== Drama CD ===
- Karneval (xxxx) – Kiichi
- Oresama Teacher (xxxx) – Mafuyu Kurosaki
- Ys II (2010) – Lilia

=== Tokusatsu ===
Year	Title	Role	Other notes
1997	Ultraman Dyna	Ryo Yumimura (girlhood) (Note: Credited under name Eri Okamura (岡村 英梨, Okamura Eri))	Ep. 46
2017	Uchu Sentai Kyuranger	Mardakko/Mecha Mardakko	Voice role, Eps. 6–9, 11–2, 15–21, 25 (Nomal), 38–43 (Mecha)

=== Japanese dub ===
==== Live-action ====
- Confidential Assignment – Park Min-young (Yoona)
- Dear Eleanor – Max the Wax (Isabelle Fuhrman)
- Detective Dee: The Four Heavenly Kings – Moon Water (Sandra Ma)
- Fantastic Beasts: The Crimes of Grindelwald – Vinda Rosier (Poppy Corby-Tuech)
- Fantastic Beasts: The Secrets of Dumbledore – Vinda Rosier (Poppy Corby-Tuech)
- Pretty Little Liars: Original Sin – Karen and Kelly Beasley (Mallory Bechtel)
- Single Rider – Ji-na (Ahn So-hee)
- Train to Busan – Jin-hee (Ahn So-hee)

==== Animation ====
- DC Super Hero Girls – Batgirl
- Lego Monkie Kid – Princess Iron Fan

== Discography ==
=== Studio albums ===
Title	Album details	Peak chart positions	Sales
Title	Album details	JPN	Sales
Re;Story	Released: July 25, 2012; Label: Starchild; Formats: CD, digital download, streaming	5	JPN: 23,000
Shōmei	Released: April 9, 2014; Label: Starchild; Formats: CD, digital download, streaming	7	JPN: 14,000
Illusion Dream	Released: August 18, 2019; Label: Dystopia Record; Formats: CD, digital download, streaming	—	
Iridescent Vision	Released: July 16, 2022; Label: Dystopia Record; Formats: CD, digital download, streaming	—	
Impact!!! Scream	Released: August 1, 2026; Label: Dystopia Record; Formats: Digital download, streaming	—	

=== Extended plays ===
Title	Album details	Peak chart positions	Sales
Title	Album details	JPN	Sales
Revolution (re:i)	Released: March 22, 2017; Label: TMS Music; Formats: CD+DVD, CD, digital download	20	JPN: 5,000

=== Singles ===
List of singles as lead artist
Title	Year	Peak chart positions		Sales	Album
Title	Year	JPN	JPN Hot 100	Sales	Album
"Before the Moment"	2004	121	—	JPN: 2,000	Non-album singles
"Tsuyogari"	2004	113	—	JPN: 900	Non-album singles
"Realize"	2008	92	—	JPN: 1,000	Non-album singles
"Guilty Future"	2009	81	—	JPN: 1,000	Non-album singles
"Be Starters!"	2011	14	44	JPN: 15,000	Re;Story
"Shirushi"	2011	16	— (Note: "Shirushi" did not enter the Billboard Japan Hot 100, but peaked at number 17 on the Hot Singles chart, and at number 5 on the Hot Animation chart.)	JPN: 14,000	Re;Story
"Happy Girl"	2012	5	15	JPN: 22,000	Re;Story
"Destiny"	2012	13	— (Note: "Destiny" did not enter the Billboard Japan Hot 100, but peaked at number 11 on the Hot Singles chart.)	JPN: 9,000	Shomei
"Miracle Gliders"	2013	13	76	JPN: 8,000	Shomei
"Chu-ning" (Note: Released under the name "Eri Kitamura feat. Kitaeri-chan" (喜多村英梨 feat. キタエリちゃん). Sold exclusively at live venues of Kitamura's Starting Story Live Tour 2013.)	2013	—	—	JPN: 8,000	Non-album single
"Birth"	2013	20	32	JPN: 16,000	Shomei
"Show"	2014	20	39	JPN: 9,000	Non-album singles
"Rinrei"	2014	10	30	JPN: 10,000	Non-album singles
"Dive to Gig -K- Aim"	2017	26	— (Note: "Dive to Gig -K- Aim" did not enter the Billboard Japan Hot 100, but peaked at number 29 on the Top Singles Sales chart.)	JPN: 4,000	Non-album singles
"K't'e'r × M'o'd'e" (Note: Sold exclusively at the venue of Kitamura's 2017 live concert KitaEri Carnival 2017: Re:Birth.)	2017	—	—		Non-album singles
"Arcadia Paroniria"	2017	23	— (Note: "Arcadia Paroniria" did not enter the Billboard Japan Hot 100, but peaked at number 26 on the Top Singles Sales chart.)	JPN: 3,000	Non-album singles
"Mōsō Teikoku Chikuonki"	2018	38	—	JPN: 2,000	Non-album singles
"Egoism"	2020	—	—		Iridescent Vision
"Scream Noise Maker"	2023	—	—		Non-album singles
"Evil Alive"	2023	—	—		Non-album singles
"Niji-iro" (vivid design mix)	2023	—	—		Non-album singles
"Roar of Shangri-la"	2024	—	—		Non-album singles
"Killer Killer"	2024	—	—		Non-album singles
"Otsu"	2025	—	—		Non-album singles
"—" denotes a recording that did not chart or was not released in that territory.

=== Other ===
2004

- Mermaid Melody Pichi Pichi Pitch "Before the Moment"
- Mermaid Melody Pichi Pichi Pitch "Beautiful Wish"
- Mermaid Melody Pichi Pichi Pitch "Birth of Love"
- Zatch Bell "Tsuyogari"
- Kuryū Yōma Gakuenki "Aokikiyoku"

2007

- Tōka Gettan "Yume Oboro" (with Mariya Ise and Saori Hayami)
- Idolmasters XENOGLOSSIA "Honoo no Sadame"
- Seto no Hanayome "Rasen"
- Kodomo no Jikan "Rettsu! Ohime-Sama Dakko!" (with Kei Shindō and Mai Kadowaki)
- Kodomo no Jikan "Otome Chikku Shoshinsha Desu" (with Kei Shindō and Mai Kawadoki)
- Koharu Biyori "Apron Dake wa Toranaide"
- Koharu Biyori "Oppai wa Dame"
- Koharu Biyori "Love Song kamo Shirenai" (with Satomi Akesaka)
- Kodomo no Jikan "Sensei.. Hajimete Desu Ka?"

2008

- ToraDora! "Pre-Parade" (with Rie Kugimiya and Yui Horie)
- ToraDora! "Ka Ra Ku Ri" (with Rie Kugimiya and Yui Horie)
- Seto no Hanayome "Mirai He Go" (with Rika Morinaga)

2009

- ToraDora! "Orange" (with Rie Kugimiya and Yui Horie)
- ToraDora! "Yes!"
- ToraDora! "Holy Night" (with Rie Kugimiya)
- ToraDora! "Complete" (with Rie Kugimiya and Yui Horie)
- ToraDora! "Please Freeze" (with Rie Kugimiya and Yui Horie)
- Minami-ke "Seenotsu" (with Aki Toyosaki)
- NEEDLESS "Aggressive Zone" (with Aya Endo, Yui Makino, Emiri Katō and Saori Gotō)
- NEEDLESS "WANTED! for the love" (with Aya Endo, Yui Makino, Emiri Katō and Saori Gotō)
- BLOOD + "Ashita he... shining future"
- Kodomo no Jikan "Guilty Future"

2010

- Working!! "SOMEONE ELSE" (with Kana Asumi and Saki Fujita)

2011

- Onii-chan no Koto Nanka Zenzen Suki Janain Dakara ne "Taste of Paradise"
- Onii-chan no Koto Nanka Zenzen Suki Janain Dakara ne "YELL ~Whistle wa Sono Mune ni~"
- Onii-chan no Koto Nanka Zenzen Suki Janain Dakara ne "Ari Ari Mirai*" (with Marina Inoue and Kazusa Aranami)
- Onii-chan no Koto Nanka Zenzen Suki Janain Dakara ne "Kimi ni OVERFLOW" (with Marina Inoue and Kazusa Aranami)
- Onii-chan no Koto Nanka Zenzen Suki Janain Dakara ne "Thrilling Everyday"
- Onii-chan no Koto Nanka Zenzen Suki Janain Dakara ne "Catch My HOPE"
- Sengoku Otome: Momoiro Paradox "SENGOKU GROOVE" (with Rina Hidaka, Megumi Toyoguchi and Yuka Hirata)
- Puella Magi Madoka Magica "And I'm Home" (with Ai Nonaka)
- Working!! "Colorful Days"
- Working!! "Wagnaria Sanga ~ A day of Todoroki Yachiyo"
- Working'!! "Coolish Walk" (with Kana Asumi and Saki Fujita)
- Mayo Chiki! "Be Starters!"
- Mayo Chiki! "Kimi Ni Gohoushi" (with Yuka Iguchi and Mariya Ise)
- Mayo Chiki! "Give Me Everything"
- Papa no Iu Koto o Kikinasai! (Listen to Me, Girls. I Am Your Father!) "Happy Girl"
- Papa no Iu Koto o Kikinasai! (Listen to Me, Girls. I Am Your Father!) "Brilliant Days"
- C3 -CubexCursedxCurious "Hana"
- C3 -CubexCursedxCurious "Shirushi"

2012

- C3 -CubexCursedxCurious "My Wish"
- ToraDora! "√HAPPYEND" (with Rie Kugimiya and Yui Horie)
- Nisemonogatari "marshmallow justice"
- Papa no Iu Koto o Kikinasai! (PSP Game) "Smile Continue" (with Sumire Uesaka and Hiromi Iragashi)
- Haiyore! Nyaruko-san "Kurogane no Striver" (with Hatano Wataru)
- Hakusei Renai Shoukougun RE:Therapy "You never know"
- Onii-chan dakedo Ai sae Areba Kankeinai yo ne! "LifeRU is LoveRU!!" (with Ibuki Kido, Minori Chihara, and Asami Shimoda)

2013

- Kami-sama no Inai Nichiyōbi "Birth"
