= Senran Kagura: Estival Versus =

2016 video game

- Developer: Tamsoft
- Publishers: JP: Marvelous; NA: Xseed Games; PAL: Marvelous Europe Limited
- Producer: Kenichiro Takaki
- Designer: Kenichiro Takaki
- Writer: Yukinori Kitajima
- Composers: Mutsumi Ishimura, Akihi Motoyama, Tatsushi Hayashi, Takako Ochiai
- Series: Senran Kagura
- Platforms: PlayStation 4, PlayStation Vita, Windows
- Release: PlayStation 4, PlayStation Vita: JP: March 26, 2015; NA: March 15, 2016; PAL: March 18, 2016; Microsoft Windows: WW: March 17, 2017
- Genre: Hack and slash
- Modes: Single-player, multiplayer

Senran Kagura: Estival Versus is a hack and slash video game developed by Tamsoft and published by Xseed Games, released for PlayStation 4 and PlayStation Vita in March 2016, and on PC on March 17, 2017. It is part of the Senran Kagura series and a sequel to Senran Kagura Shinovi Versus. The game follows girls of rival kunoichi schools as they are teleported to a mysterious tropical island-like world and are challenged to fight for the secrets of shinobi lore. The game was praised for its gameplay and story, but its heavy fan service was controversial, with some reviewers calling the ecchi themes too intense for a casual player.

== Release ==
Estival Versus has two special editions, one for the PlayStation 4, and one for the PlayStation Vita. The editions are called the Nyuu Nyuu DX Pack Premium, and contained: a copy of the game; a special collectors box; a product code for Senran Kagura: Estival Versus—Eve Full of Swimsuits, a 30-minute original video animation (OVA) featuring 20 of the game's characters; a Drama CD; a soundtrack CD; and mini figurines. The only difference between the two editions are which set of figurines they contain, and what tracks are on each Drama CD. The Vita special edition contains figurines of characters from the Hebijo Clandestine Girls’ Academy, while the PlayStation 4 edition contains figurines from the Gessen Girls’ Private School. The first-print run of the collectors editions also contained a bonus 2-CD set of the game's soundtrack, and a visual book.

The game features DLC guest characters, the first of whom was the Dead or Alive/Ninja Gaiden series' Ayane. Included in this wave of DLC was Ayane's kimono along with the trademark blue kunoichi costume of Kasumi in a mash-up collab with Marvelous. In return, Dead or Alive 5 Last Round featured a costume set where the female characters are dressed as Senran Kagura characters and were even breakable on PlayStation 4/Xbox One versions of the game. Ayane in this set is dressed as Yagyū. Besides Ayane, three characters from Ikki Tousen, Hakufu Sonsaku, Uncho Kan'u, and Housen Ryofu also appeared as the last three guest characters. Due to temporary licensing issues, the Ikki Tousen characters would temporarily not appear in Western versions until the PC port, which was released on March 17, 2017. The Ayane character was delisted from online store in March 17, 2021.

== Reception ==
The game received an aggregate score of 67/100 on Metacritic, for its PlayStation 4 version, indicating "mixed or average reviews". The Vita and PC versions had similar scores, both receiving an aggregate score of 71/100.

CJ Andriessen of Destructoid rated the game 75/100, saying he enjoyed the game's "combination of flashy action and fan service", but said that the story does the game no favors and that it was not the best in the series. He called the Vita version playable, but a downgrade in most ways from the PS4 version.

Jason Bohn of Hardcore Gamer rated the game 3/5 points, calling the game "aggressively silly" and "dumb fun". He stated that while the game could be seen as objectifying women, it was done with a "wink and a nudge" and he would not be embarrassed to play it with his wife in the room on account of the characters being strong.

Robert Ramsey of Push Square rated the game 6/10 stars, calling it a "reasonably solid hack and slasher", and calling the game's online multiplayer "shockingly robust", although stating that he struggled to find full rooms due to the low multiplayer population.
