= Senran Kagura: Peach Beach Splash =

2017 video game

- European cover art
- Developer: Tamsoft
- Publisher: Marvelous: NA: Xseed Games
- Producer: Kenichiro Takaki
- Designer: Kenichiro Takaki
- Artist: Nan Yaegashi
- Writer: Yukinori Kitajima
- Composers: Tatsushi Hayashi, Akihi Motoyama, Mutsumi Ishimura, Takako Ochiai, Luna Umegaki
- Series: Senran Kagura
- Platforms: PlayStation 4, Microsoft Windows
- Release: PlayStation 4: JP: March 16, 2017; WW: September 26, 2017; Microsoft Windows: WW: March 7, 2018
- Genre: Third-person shooter
- Modes: Single-player, multiplayer

Senran Kagura: Peach Beach Splash (Note: Senran Kagura: Peach Beach Splash (Japanese: 閃乱カグラ PEACH BEACH SPLASH)) is a 2017 third-person shooter video game developed by Tamsoft and published by Marvelous for the PlayStation 4. It is an installment of the Senran Kagura series. A Microsoft Windows version was released in 2018. The game focuses on the Peach Beach Splash water gun tournament, to which female ninjas from various factions are invited, and where the winning team has any reward it wants. Players take the roles of the ninjas, and fight in various kinds of game modes, some of which are online multiplayer battles, and some of which are single-player.

The game was produced by Kenichiro Takaki and written by Yukinori Kitajima, with character designs by Nan Yaegashi, and was created to bring everything from the various Senran Kagura games together, to establish a single world where all of it takes place. The plot was written as part of the series' main storyline, as something future games in the series would build upon.

== Gameplay ==
Players battle using water guns, and can customize their character using cards (bottom left).

Peach Beach Splash is a third-person shooter in which players control shinobi from various games in the Senran Kagura series, using different types of water guns with different abilities: for example, the single hand gun consumes little water and shoots ricocheting water bullets, and the shower gun continually sprays a short-range water mist. Each water gun has two modes which the player can switch between: for instance, the water balloon grenade launcher's balloons can be set to either explode or bounce upon impact, and the sniper rifle can be set to either being powerful with a narrow lock-on range or half as powerful with a wide lock-on range. In addition to water gun moves, players can use short-range moves that are more difficult to use, but which cause a lot of damage and push the opponent back. Players finish off opponents by activating a Kunekune Finish, in which they soak the opponent in water while aiming at their breasts and buttocks. Battles are fought in different arenas, including beaches, water fronts and pirate ships.

Characters can be customized through the use of equippable cards that come in three types: weapon, skill and companion cards. Skill cards give players various effects, such as the ability to restore health, or lowering an opponent's attack power; a maximum of six can be equipped at a time. Companion cards are used to summon a character that fights alongside player-controlled characters, which can help players with things such as covering fire; a maximum of three can be equipped at a time. The cards need to be activated during the battle for their effects to be applied. The skills need to be charged up for this to be possible; by performing a Kunekune Finish, the player gets a temporary "Finish Bonus" that makes skills charge faster for a certain amount of time. By synthesizing multiple cards, the player can create higher-leveled, stronger cards. The player acquires cards as rewards for clearing stages, and through an in-game store that sells ten-card packs. The store also sells cosmetic items such as rubber ducks that change the colors of Kunekune Finishes, avatar icons and stamps.

The game includes several different modes. There is a single-player story mode called the Single Splash, in which the player fights boss characters such as a giant, bathing, nude woman, with the goal to shoot away the foam that covers her body; and giant massage and licking machines, with the goal to avoid their attacks and hit their weak spots. In the Paradise Episodes mode, the player plays comical episodes focusing on individual characters. The V-Road Challenge mode is an action mode where the player picks a team of characters and plays through four cups as them, to win cards and in-game money. The Multi-Splash online mode includes three types of multiplayer battles: Ranked Match, where players fight each other in two teams of five in randomly selected stages, with the goal of raising one's Peach Points and ranking, thus enabling better rewards; Free Match, where a player hosts a match and can customize the rules; and Co-Op Survival, where players protect a tower from enemies. It is also possible to play the Co-Op Survival mode on one's own, with the other characters being computer-controlled. In addition to the battle and story modes, the player can visit the characters' locker room and set them in various poses, and customize their expressions, costumes and hair styles. Within the locker room, the player can access a water gun mode, where they can spray the characters to make their clothing see-through, or control a pair of hands used to touch the characters, with different reactions depending on where they are touched.

== Plot ==
The game's plot focuses on the Peach Beach Splash water gun tournament, which has been held by ninjas since ancient times. In it, participants are not allowed to use their special ninja abilities, instead being given water guns to use. Shinobi from various factions have been invited to the tournament, and fight in teams; the winning team is said to get anything they want as a reward.

== Development and release ==
Peach Beach Splash was developed by Tamsoft and published by Marvelous, and planned and produced by Kenichiro Takaki, with character designs by Nan Yaegashi and scenario writing by Yukinori Kitajima. The game was designed with both newcomers and series fans in mind, with the intention that it should be enjoyable for both. New finishing moves similar to those seen in previous Senran Kagura games were implemented, but with the intention of improving them, and with "costume break" scenes added. The plot was created to be part of the main story of the series, with the goal of having future Senran Kagura games be built upon the story of Peach Beach Splash. Another goal with the game's story was bringing everything from the series together, to establish one single world that everything is part of. Takaki said that they were working on creating a large number of costume options that become transparent when wet.

The game was announced by Famitsu in October 2016, and had gone gold by February 2017. It was released for PlayStation 4 on March 16, 2017, in Japan. The Japanese release was made available in a standard edition, as well as a limited edition that includes an illustrated box, an artbook, a Blu-ray with the opening animation, the game's soundtrack and five pieces of DLC. A more expensive limited edition that also includes a large mousepad depicting the character Yumi was also released. North American, European and Australian releases were planned for September 22, 2017.

The developers said during the development that they were planning to add further characters, costumes and story content to as downloadable content (DLC); Takaki hoped that this would include collaboration content. Such DLC was later announced and includes crossover characters from Super Sonico, Hyperdimension Neptunia, Dead or Alive (part of a co-promotion with Dead or Alive Xtreme 3), Ikki Tousen and Valkyrie Drive. In May 2017, an update was released, adding a capture-the-flag game mode, a new map, and two new story episodes. Another update was released in September 2018 for the Windows version, adding a virtual reality mode.

On February 16, 2018, Xseed Games announced that Senran Kagura: Peach Beach Splash would be available on Microsoft Windows via Steam on March 7, 2018. The PC version has a standard release, and a limited Sexy Soaker edition, which includes various DLC.

== Reception ==
Reception

Aggregate score
Aggregator	Score
Metacritic	PS4: 70/100

Review score
Publication	Score
Famitsu	32/40

The game received "mixed or average" reviews according to the review aggregator platform Metacritic. Cory Arnold of Destructoid thought that the game "actually looks pretty fun", and that it despite seeming dumb and sexual should be interesting to fans of shooting games due to its unusual water gun gameplay and its sliding mechanic.

By June 2017, the game had passed 100,000 physical and digital copies sold in Japan.
