= Senran Kagura Burst =

2011 video game

- European Burst cover art
- Developer: Tamsoft
- Publishers: JP: Marvelous Entertainment Inc.; NA: Xseed Games; PAL: Marvelous AQL, Zen United
- Director: Kenichiro Takaki
- Producer: Kenichiro Takaki
- Writer: Yukinori Kitajima
- Composers: Akihi Motoyama, Kimiyo Ishida, Mutsumi Ishimura, Tomoyuki Hamada
- Series: Senran Kagura
- Platforms: Nintendo 3DS; PlayStation 4; Microsoft Windows
- Release: Skirting Shadows; Nintendo 3DS: JP: September 22, 2011; Burst; Nintendo 3DS: JP: August 30, 2012; NA: November 14, 2013; PAL: February 27, 2014; Burst Re:Newal; PlayStation 4: JP: February 22, 2018; PAL: January 18, 2019; NA: January 22, 2019; Microsoft Windows: WW: January 22, 2019
- Genre: Hack and slash
- Mode: Single-player

Senran Kagura Burst (Note: Known in Japan as Senran Kagura Burst: Guren no Shōjo-tachi (閃乱カグラ Burst -紅蓮の少女達-, "Crimson Girls")) is a side-scrolling hack and slash video game revolving around shinobi, developed by Tamsoft and the first entry in the Senran Kagura series. It was originally published for the Nintendo 3DS in Japan as Senran Kagura: Skirting Shadows (Note: Known in Japan as Senran Kagura: Shōjo-tachi no Shin'ei (閃乱カグラ -少女達の真影-, "Portrait of Girls")) in 2011; an expanded "director's cut" version was released in 2012, and received Western releases in 2013–2014. A remake, subtitled Re:Newal, was released for the PlayStation 4 in 2018 and Microsoft Windows in 2019. Senran Kagura Burst was followed up by Senran Kagura Shinovi Versus (2013) while a later follow up for the 3DS was released as Senran Kagura 2: Deep Crimson (2014).

== Gameplay ==
The beat-'em-up sections of the game feature side-scrolling action gameplay. Here, Yagyū faces off against a group of enemy lesser shinobi.

Senran Kagura is a side-scrolling "hack and slash" action game. The player assumes control of one of five female ninjas. The more the game characters are damaged by enemies, the more their clothes are torn off. The information for each character's back story, major plot points, and general information on the universe of Senran Kagura is displayed in what is called the "novel", and is structured similarly to a visual novel. The novel is introduced at major plot points in the game story.

The main gameplay consists of battling through the world of the story. As the game progresses, the player's character levels up and gains new moves and abilities, and in-game content such as art work, achievements, music, costumes (of which there are 180), and new characters are unlocked. The game is split into 5 chapters, with each chapter containing a number of main missions as well as optional missions. Once a story mission is complete, the mission can be played again with any of the unlocked characters. At the end of a mission the player is graded according to the player character's health, attack, and speed in completing the mission. Burst has two different routes to play through, instead of the one in the original. Before the start of a mission, the player can choose to activate "Frantic Mode": by removing the clothing except underwear, the player gets a massive enhancement in attack and speed but a considerable loss of defense.

== Plot ==
Kept secret from the rest of the world, high school girls are secretly trained in the art of ninjitsu. Senran Kagura: Skirting Shadows revolves around the trainee shinobi of Hanzō Academy; Asuka, Ikaruga, Katsuragi, Yagyuu and Hibari, as they complete missions and battle against rival ninjas. Crimson Girls on the other hand follows the students of the dark academy, Hebijo Clandestine Girls' Academy; Homura, Yomi, Hikage, Mirai and Haruka.

Senran Kagura Burst includes an additional story, The Crimson Girls.

== Development ==
Producer Kenichiro Takaki's original inspiration for Senran Kagura was from a desire to create something that was very easy to understand but also very deep and detailed for those who appreciate beautiful female characters. He had the idea for the game in April 2010 when he decided to develop a game for the then newly announced Nintendo 3DS. When thinking about what type of game to make for a 3D handheld, he decided that one of the things people most wanted to see in 3D were breasts. He began making Senran Kagura's design document, and created a budget, characters, a plot and decided upon gameplay elements, after which he met with character designer Nan Yaegashi and scenario writer Yukinori Kitajima. The games feature character designs by Nan Yaegashi and scenario work from Yukinori Kitajima.

The game was originally released in Japan for the Nintendo 3DS on September 22, 2011, as Skirting Shadows. Senran Kagura Burst, an expanded director's cut version containing both the Skirting Shadows story and a new story titled The Crimson Girls, was published on August 30, 2012, in Japan, and digitally through the Nintendo eShop on November 22, 2013, in North America by Xseed. In Europe, Burst was released digitally on February 27, 2014, by Marvelous AQL, and physically a day later. Zen United also released a European limited edition of the game on the same day, titled "Life & Hometown Edition", which includes a t-shirt and a lenticular poster.

Ken Berry of North American publisher Marvelous USA stated in early May 2013 that they had considered releasing Senran Kagura Burst digitally outside Japan, but that it was a "scary proposition due to the subject matter and difference in attitudes between Japanese culture and the more conservative culture ... in the U.S." On August 6, 2013, Xseed Games officially announced it would release the game digitally via the Nintendo eShop in Fall 2013.

== Reception ==
Reception

Aggregate score
Aggregator	Score
Metacritic	3DS: 62/100; PS4: 65/100

Review score
Publication	Score
Famitsu	PS4: 31/40

Senran Kagura was met by a wide range of reviews, from negative to positive.

Multiplayer.it appreciated the story and combat, as well as the many quests and secrets that were available to unlock, but took issue with the variable framerate and the repetitive gameplay. Metro criticised the game as sexist, but admitted the characters were a "likeable bunch". It also described the gameplay as "unbearably bad", but did appreciate the variety that the different player characters provided. GameZone's Mike Splechta gave the game a 7.5/10, stating that if one liked "[their] anime chicks badass with a healthy dose of jiggle physics, Senran Kagura Burst satisfies on those levels" but warned that there were "painful framerate dips". Gamestyle characterised both the visuals and dialogue as "creepy", but stated that the game was a "solid, if basic, side scrolling beat em up". Pocket Gamer described the game as "an unabashed, tongue-in-cheek romp that will have you smiling and button-mashing from start to finish". Hardcore Gamer appreciated the game's combat, customization options, and "wealth of unlockables and content", but warned those who would not appreciate the sexualisation of the game characters to stay away.

The PC version of the remake was among the best-selling new releases of the month on Steam. (Note: Based on total revenue for the first two weeks on sale)
