= Senran Kagura: Bon Appétit! =

2014 video game

- Developer: Meteorise
- Publishers: JP: Marvelous AQL; NA: XSEED Games; PAL: Marvelous Europe
- Director: Kenichiro Takaki
- Producer: Kenichiro Takaki
- Writer: Yukinori Kitajima
- Composers: Akihi Motoyama, Mutsumi Ishimura
- Series: Senran Kagura
- Platforms: PlayStation Vita, Microsoft Windows
- Release: PlayStation Vita: JP: March 20, 2014; NA: November 11, 2014; PAL: November 12, 2014; Microsoft Windows: WW: November 10, 2016
- Genre: Rhythm
- Mode: Single player

Senran Kagura: Bon Appétit! is a 2014 cooking-themed rhythm video game and a spinoff in the Senran Kagura series. The game was released on the PlayStation Store for PlayStation Vita, while an enhanced version subtitled Full Course was released in 2016, which was also ported to Microsoft Windows.

== Gameplay ==
Tapping along with the music can create combos, and the more combos the better the food created in the game is. The game consists of 10 levels, equating to 10 dishes that must be created. Every other level reveals more of the player's shinobi character's story. All of the character and costume DLC from Senran Kagura Shinovi Versus is compatible with Senran Kagura: Bon Appétit!.

== Plot ==
In the game, Master Hanzo convinces the shinobi warriors of Senran Kagura to cook for him by holding a cooking competition, with first prize being a Secret Ninja Art Scroll which grants one wish.

== Development and release ==
Downloadable content (DLC), the "Gessen x Hebijo DLC pack", is available. It provides extra levels (dishes to create) and a free soundtrack app that features songs from the game.

The game was released for PlayStation Vita on November 11, 2014 for North America, and on November 12, 2014 for Europe. An enhanced version for Microsoft Windows titled Senran Kagura: Bon Appétit! - Full Course was released on November 10, 2016.

== Reception ==
Reception

Aggregate score
Aggregator	Score
Metacritic	(PSV) 61/100 (PC) 62/100

Senran Kagura: Bon Appétit! received "mixed or average" reviews according to review aggregator platform Metacritic.
