= Senran Kagura =

Video game series and media franchise

- Logo for the Nintendo Switch era games (formerly used for the non-Nintendo era games)
- Developers: Tamsoft, Marvelous, Meteorise, Honey Parade Games
- Publisher: Marvelous
- Creator: Kenichiro Takaki
- Platforms: Nintendo 3DS, iOS, Android, PlayStation Vita, PlayStation 4, Microsoft Windows, Nintendo Switch
- First release: Senran Kagura: Skirting Shadows; September 22, 2011

Senran Kagura (Japanese: 閃乱カグラ) is a multimedia franchise created by Kenichiro Takaki and developed primarily by Tamsoft and Marvelous. The series debuted in Japan in 2011 with the release of Senran Kagura: Shōjo-tachi no Shinei (Senran Kagura: Portrait of Girls) for the Nintendo 3DS and debuted abroad in 2013 with Senran Kagura Burst. The franchise has since expanded into numerous video games, manga adaptations, anime series, and merchandise.

The Senran Kagura games are primarily action hack and slash titles where players control one of several characters in combat missions against enemy shinobi or supernatural foes. The series is also notable for its RPG elements, character customization, and fast-paced combat system. Spin-off titles have incorporated other genres, such as rhythm games and third-person shooters.

The series centers on groups of female shinobi from various academies, focusing on their training, missions, and personal lives. While the narrative often explores themes of friendship, rivalry, and self-discovery, it is also known for its over-the-top action, comedic elements, and a high emphasis on fan service, particularly through its character designs and interactions. The story typically revolves around rivalries between "good" shinobi academies, such as Hanzo National Academy, and "evil" academies, such as Hebijo Clandestine Girls' Academy. Despite the conflicts, the series often delves into the characters' backstories, exploring their motivations and struggles. Each character has a distinct fighting style, weapon, and personality, making for a diverse cast.

== Games ==
Games, by year and platform
Title	Year	Console		PC	Handheld		Mobile	
Title	Year	PlayStation 4	Nintendo Switch	Windows	Nintendo 3DS	PlayStation Vita	Android	iOS
Senran Kagura: Skirting Shadows	2011	No	No	No	Yes	No	No	No
Senran Kagura Burst	2012	No	No	No	Yes	No	No	No
Senran Kagura: New Wave	2012	No	No	No	No	No	Yes	Yes
Senran Kagura Shinovi Versus	2013	No	No	Yes	No	Yes	No	No
Senran Kagura: Bon Appétit!	2014	No	No	Yes	No	Yes	No	No
Senran Kagura 2: Deep Crimson	2014	No	No	No	Yes	No	No	No
Senran Kagura: Estival Versus	2015	Yes	No	Yes	No	Yes	No	No
Senran Kagura: Peach Beach Splash	2017	Yes	No	Yes	No	No	No	No
Senran Kagura: Reflexions	2017	No	Yes	Yes	No	No	No	No
Shinobi Master Senran Kagura: New Link	2017	No	No	No	No	No	Yes	Yes
Senran Kagura Burst Re:Newal	2018	Yes	No	Yes	No	No	No	No
Senran Kagura: Peach Ball	2018	No	Yes	Yes	No	No	No	No
Neptunia x Senran Kagura: Ninja Wars	2021	Yes	Yes	Yes	No	No	No	No
Senran Kagura Run	2024	No	No	No	No	No	Yes	Yes
Senran Kagura: Shinovi NEXUS	2026	No	No	Yes	No	No	Yes	Yes

Release timeline
2011	Senran Kagura: Skirting Shadows
2012	Senran Kagura Burst
2012	Senran Kagura: New Wave
2013	Senran Kagura Shinovi Versus
2014	Senran Kagura: Bon Appétit!
2014	Senran Kagura 2: Deep Crimson
2015	Senran Kagura: Estival Versus
2016
2017	Senran Kagura: Peach Beach Splash
2017	Senran Kagura: Reflexions
2017	Shinobi Master Senran Kagura: New Link
2018	Senran Kagura Burst Re:Newal
2018	Senran Kagura: Peach Ball
2019
2020
2021	Neptunia x Senran Kagura: Ninja Wars
2022
2023
2024	Senran Kagura Run
2025
2026	Senran Kagura: Shinovi NEXUS

=== Main series ===
==== Senran Kagura: Skirting Shadows and Senran Kagura Burst ====
The first game in the series, Senran Kagura: Shōjo-tachi no Shin'ei (閃乱カグラ -少女達の真影-; Senran Kagura: Skirting Shadows), is a side scrolling action game with playable ninja characters that was released in Japan for the Nintendo 3DS on September 22, 2011. The sequel, Senran Kagura Burst (閃乱カグラ Burst), consists of the original game and an extra storyline. It was released in Japan for Nintendo 3DS on August 30, 2012, and was later released digitally on the Nintendo eShop on January 10, 2013.

==== Senran Kagura Shinovi Versus ====
Senran Kagura Shinovi Versus: Shōjo-tachi no Shōmei (閃乱カグラ SHINOVI VERSUS -少女達の証明-) is the sequel to Senran Kagura Burst. The gameplay transitions to a third-person action game with full 3D graphics, with the game itself featuring an expanded playable character roster, as well as an online multiplayer mode. The game was released in Japan for the PlayStation Vita on February 28, 2013, in North America on October 14, 2014, and in Europe on October 15, 2014.

==== Senran Kagura 2: Deep Crimson ====
Senran Kagura 2: Deep Crimson is a 2.5D side-scrolling action game made for the 3DS, and was developed by the same team which created Senran Kagura Burst. Senran Kagura 2: Deep Crimson was released in Japan on August 7, 2014, for Nintendo 3DS. The game was released in North America, Europe, and Australia via digital and limited physical copies in August through September 2015.

New gameplay is included in the form of pair battles, which allows a second character, to which the player can give commands, to fight alongside the player's character.

The playable characters in the game are customizable. Outfits, accessory size and position, and hair color can be changed to the player's liking. Augmented reality functionality was also included in the game, allowing players to pose the playable characters against a real-life background.

The sequel improved on the original, by enhancing breast physics and clothing destruction, introducing the first playable male character, and allowing for pair battles. Daidouji and Rin, two characters that had originally appeared in Senran Kagura: Shinovi Versus as downloadable content, were part of the regular playable character roster in the game.

Senran Kagura 2: Deep Crimson was part of a cross-promotion deal with Umaibo ("delicious stick" in Japanese), a Japanese brand of corn puff snacks, in which the game's playable characters appeared on the brand's product packaging.

==== Senran Kagura: Estival Versus ====
Senran Kagura: Estival Versus was released on March 26, 2015, in Japan. The game was released in North America on March 15, 2016, and Europe on March 18, 2016.

The game sold 44,548 physical retail copies on the PlayStation Vita in addition to 30,247 physical copies on the PlayStation 4 within the first week of release in Japan.

==== Senran Kagura: Peach Beach Splash ====
Senran Kagura: Peach Beach Splash is a water gun third-person shooter for the PlayStation 4 and Microsoft Windows. It features over 30 girls who play on teams. Peach Beach Splash was released in Japan on March 16, 2017. The game released in North America on September 26, 2017, and in Europe on September 22, 2017, for the PlayStation 4, and later worldwide on March 7, 2018, for the PC.

=== Other games ===
==== Senran Kagura: New Wave ====
Senran Kagura: New Wave is a card battling game available on Android and iOS devices in Japan. The game's popularity resulted in a crossover promotion with DrawGirls, a Korean picture discovery mobile game in which the player draws a cursor across the screen to reveal pieces of a picture.

==== Senran Kagura: Bon Appétit! ====
Senran Kagura: Bon Appétit! is a rhythm cooking game available for the PlayStation Vita, in which the goal is to win a cooking competition. The game was released on the PlayStation Store on November 11, 2014, for North America, and on November 12, 2014, for Europe.

==== Senran Kagura: Reflexions ====
A spin-off title for the Nintendo Switch, an ecchi dating sim game called Shinobi Refle: Senran Kagura (Japanese: シノビリフレ -SENRAN KAGURA-, Hepburn: Shinobi rifure) was released in Japan on November 23, 2017. The game takes advantage of the Joy-Con's "HD Rumble" feature, allowing players to receive feedback from jiggle physics. It was published by Xseed Games on the European and North American eShop under the title Senran Kagura: Reflexions on September 13, 2018.

==== Shinobi Master Senran Kagura: New Link ====
Shinobi Master Senran Kagura: New Link was a mobile game for iOS and Android smartphones devices in Japan. It was developed by Honey Parade Games and released on November 29, 2017. Shinomas was a turn-based RPG that collaborated with several IPs before its shutdown on May 31, 2025.

==== Senran Kagura Burst Re:Newal ====
Senran Kagura Burst Re:Newal is a remake of the first game in the series in the same gameplay style as Shinovi Versus and Estival Versus.

==== Senran Kagura: Peach Ball ====
A second spin-off game for the Nintendo Switch, an ecchi pinball game called Peach Ball: Senran Kagura (Japanese: PEACH BALL 閃乱カグラ) was announced in 2017. The game was released in Japan on December 13, 2018, and scheduled for release in North America, Europe, and Australia on July 9, 2019. It features a mode similar to Senran Kagura Reflexions that takes advantage of the Joy-Con's "HD Rumble" feature.

==== Neptunia × Senran Kagura: Ninja Wars ====
Originally titled Senran Nin Nin Ninja Taisen Neptune: Shoujo-tachi no Kyouen, Neptunia × Senran Kagura: Ninja Wars is a crossover game with the Hyperdimension Neptunia series, released on September 16, 2021, in Japan and October 26, 2021, in North America for the PlayStation 4.

==== Senran Kagura Run ====
Senran Kagura Run is the second mobile game for iOS and Android smartphone devices, It was released on November 20, 2024, by Marvelous and Honey Parade Games, It features a single character Asuka to run getting the futomaki. It was after the creator of the franchise Ken'ichiro Takaki left the game series and Marvelous after moving to Cygames in March 2019.

==== Senran Kagura: Shinovi NEXUS ====
Shinovi NEXUS is a mobile game for Windows, iOS and Android mobile platforms, It was confirmed on October 18 and 19, 2025 by Marvelous and Honey Parade Games, The story takes place three years after the events of the previous mobile title, Shinovi Masters Senran Kagura: New Link. The game features a new cast of five shinobi girls and a new academy. Returning characters Gekkō and Senkō from New Link have also been confirmed to appear. Longtime series artist Nan Yaegashi is returning to handle character designs. While currently focused on mobile, developers have expressed a desire to eventually expand the Senran Kagura world back into console titles in a form that "suits the current era". It was officially announced on August 1, 2026 in Japan.

== Controversy ==
In 2014, Official Nintendo Magazine wrote a preview about Senran Kagura 2: Deep Crimson (misnaming it as Senran Kagura Burst 2), labeling the game as "filth" and describing it as sexual objectification with breasts and buttocks. This elicited a response from Hatsuu, the Production Coordinator at Xseed Games, to unofficially reply, criticizing the writer's views as superficial and ignorant to the game's characters, story and actual gameplay. She also mentioned that a writer for Official Nintendo Magazine unsuccessfully attempted to boycott the game without having any knowledge, and that the writer made inappropriate jokes such as describing large breasts as "smuggling fleshy watermelons".

== Reception ==
Aggregate review scores
Game	Metacritic
Senran Kagura Burst	(3DS) 62/100
Senran Kagura Shinovi Versus	(PSV) 67/100 (PC) 70/100
Senran Kagura: Bon Appétit!	(PSV) 61/100 (PC) 62/100 (Full Course)
Senran Kagura 2: Deep Crimson	(3DS) 58/100
Senran Kagura: Estival Versus	(PS4) 67/100 (PSV) 71/100 (PC) 71/100
Senran Kagura: Peach Beach Splash	(PS4) 70/100
Senran Kagura: Reflexions	(NS) 39/100
Senran Kagura Burst Re:Newal	(PS4) 65/100
Senran Kagura: Peach Ball	(NS) 62/100
Neptunia x Senran Kagura: Ninja Wars	(PS4) 65/100 (NS) 65/100

== Other media ==
- Senran Kagura

閃乱カグラ
- Genre: Action
Further information
Anime television series
Senran Kagura: Ninja Flash!
Directed by	Takashi Watanabe
Produced by	Muneyuki Kanbe; Shinsaku Tanaka
Written by	Takao Yoshioka
Music by	Ruka Kawada
Studio	Artland
Licensed by	AUS: Madman Entertainment; NA: Crunchyroll
Original network	AT-X, Tokyo MX
English network	US: Funimation Channel
Original run	January 6, 2013 – March 24, 2013
Episodes	12 + 6 specials
Original video animation
Senran Kagura: Estival Versus – Festival Eve Full of Swimsuits
Directed by	Shigeru Ueda
Produced by	Shinsaki Tanaka; Hisato Usui; Tetsuya Tsuchihashi; Yoshiyuki Itō
Written by	Yukinori Kitajima
Music by	Ruka Kawada
Studio	Hoods Entertainment
Released	March 24, 2015
Runtime	30 minutes
Anime television series
Senran Kagura: Shinovi Master
Directed by	Tetsuya Yanagisawa
Produced by	Kazuaki Morijiri; Satoshi Motonaga; Terushige Yoshie; Noritomo Isogai; Hideyuki Saida; Shōgo Kosaki; Tetsurō Miura; Misato Aoki; Norio Kawamura
Written by	Yukinori Kitajima
Music by	Noisycroak
Studio	TNK
Licensed by	NA: Crunchyroll Funimation
Original network	AT-X, Tokyo MX, BS11
Original run	October 12, 2018 – December 28, 2018
Episodes	12
- icon

=== Manga ===
Senran Kagura was debuted on August 19, 2011, as a multimedia franchise but debuted on a manga serialization on Enterbrain's Famitsu Comic Clear, There are various manga series based on the franchise. The main adaptation, written by Kenichirō Takaki and illustrated by Amami Takatsume, began serialization in Media Factory's Monthly Comic Alive magazine from August 27, 2011. Seven Seas Entertainment began releasing the series in North America in November 2013 as Senran Kagura: Skirting Shadows. Senran Kagura: Guren no Uroboros, illustrated by Manabu Aoi, began serialization in Ichijinsha's Comic Rex magazine from September 27, 2011. Senran Kagura Spark! was published in Enterbrain's Famitsu Comic Clear between August 19, 2011, and February 17, 2012, followed by Senran Kagura: Senshi Bankō no Haruka and Senran Enji Kyonyū-gumi, both published between September 7, 2012, and February 1, 2013.

=== Anime ===
An anime television adaptation animated by Artland aired in Japan between January 6, 2013, and March 24, 2013. The series is directed by Takashi Watanabe with scripts by Takao Yoshioka, and character designs by Takashi Torii. The opening theme, "Break Your World", was performed by Sayaka Sasaki. The ending themes include "Fighting Dreamer" (episode 1–3 and 8) by Hitomi Harada, Asami Imai, Yū Kobayashi, Kaori Mizuhashi, and Yuka Iguchi, "Yamiyo wa Otome wo Hana ni Suru" (闇夜は乙女を花にする, The Flowers of the Girls of the Night) (episode 4-6 and 9) by Eri Kitamura, Ai Kayano, Ryōko Shiraishi, Saori Gotō, and Megumi Toyoguchi, and "Shissōron" (疾走論, Theory Sprint) (episode 7 and 10–12) by Hitomi Harada. The anime is licensed in North America by Funimation Entertainment, who streamed it as it aired and released it on home video in 2014.

A second season of the anime series was announced in August 2017. The season, titled Senran Kagura Shinovi Master -Tokyo Yōma-hen-, is directed by Tetsuya Yanagisawa and animated by TNK, with scripts written by Yukinori Kitajima and character designs handled by Junji Goto. The season premiered from October 12 to December 28, 2018, on AT-X, Tokyo MX, and BS11. The opening theme, "Scarlet Master", is performed by Sayaka Sasaki, while the ending theme, "Junsei Erotic", is performed by Mia Regina. Crunchyroll streams the series with Funimation streaming the simuldub.
