= Senran Kagura Shinovi Versus =

2013 video game

- Developer: Tamsoft
- Publishers: JP: Marvelous AQL; NA: XSEED Games; PAL: Marvelous AQL Europe
- Director: Kenichiro Takaki
- Producer: Kenichiro Takaki
- Writer: Yukinori Kitajima
- Composers: Ryuta Asano, Tatsushi Hayashi, Keiko Kimoto, Akihi Motoyama, Riku Ono
- Series: Senran Kagura
- Platforms: PlayStation Vita, Microsoft Windows
- Release: PlayStation Vita: JP: February 28, 2013; NA: October 14, 2014; PAL: October 15, 2014; Microsoft Windows: WW: June 1, 2016
- Genre: Hack and slash
- Mode: Multiplayer; single-player

Senran Kagura Shinovi Versus (閃乱カグラ SHINOVI VERSUS -少女達の証明-, Senran Kagura Shinovi Versus: Shōjo-tachi no Shōmei) is a 2013 action video game developed by Tamsoft, and the second main (third overall) title in the Senran Kagura series as the sequel to Senran Kagura Burst. The game revolves around four female ninja groups from dueling shinobi schools. The game was released in Japan for the PlayStation Vita on February 28, 2013, in North America on October 14, 2014, and in Europe on October 15, 2014. A version for Microsoft Windows released on June 1, 2016.

== Gameplay ==
The single-player mode of the game has a roster of 20 characters, 10 from the original game, and 10 new ones. The new playable characters are from the story's Gessen Girls' Private School and the Hebijo Clandestine Girls' Academy. The game included various weapons for the player character to use, including giant pancakes, and attacks consist of both light and heavy versions. Completing the story lines for each of the game's schools gives the player access to Homura's Crimson Squad, a group of playable characters consisting of the character Homura's team from Senran Kagura Burst.

The game also provided an online multiplayer mode in which four players could play against each other; and a two-versus-two online mode in which two teams of two players could play against each other. The competitive multiplayer mode tasks the players with collecting panties as they fall from the sky.

== Plot ==
Shinovi Versus followed on the story in Senran Kagura Burst, revisiting the conflict between the ninjas of Hanzō National Academy and the rival Hebijo Clandestine Girls’ Academy, while also introducing a third faction, the Gessen Girls’ Academy. In the game's story, each ninja school participates in a competition, called the Shinobi Battle Royale, with another school, during which competition one school's team invades another. The attackers must defeat all their enemies, and if they do so they earn the right to burn the attacked school to the ground. During arcade mode, the game reveals to the player the story of the particular ninja character with which they play. The sequel allowed the player to experience the game's story through four different perspectives.

== Development and release ==
The game was developed in a 3D perspective, and increased the playable roster of ninjas to 22 characters. The original Japanese voice overs were used for the localized release, accompanied by English subtitles. A physical edition for the western release, dubbed “Let’s Get Physical”, came with a 144-page book, which contained art and strategy guides, and a disc with 39 musical tracks, in a collector's box, making it the first game in the series to be released at retailers in North America.

== Reception ==
Reception

Aggregate score
Aggregator	Score
Metacritic	VITA: 67/100; PC: 70/100

Review scores
Publication	Score
Destructoid	VITA: 8/10
Famitsu	32/40

The game sold 94,324 physical retail copies within its first week of release in Japan, adding to a total number of 120,000 copies, which included digital sales. The game also ranked as the third most purchased digital Vita game and the fifth most purchased digital game overall on the Japanese PlayStation Network in 2013.

Destructoid's Brittany Vincent wrote that the game "looks and feels great" and that it had "plenty of hack and slash goodness to offer". Hardcore Gamer warned that, due to its sexiness, the game "wasn't for everyone", and although it found the camera problematic, it appreciated the game's charm.
