= Cygames =

Japanese entertainment company

Cygames, Inc.

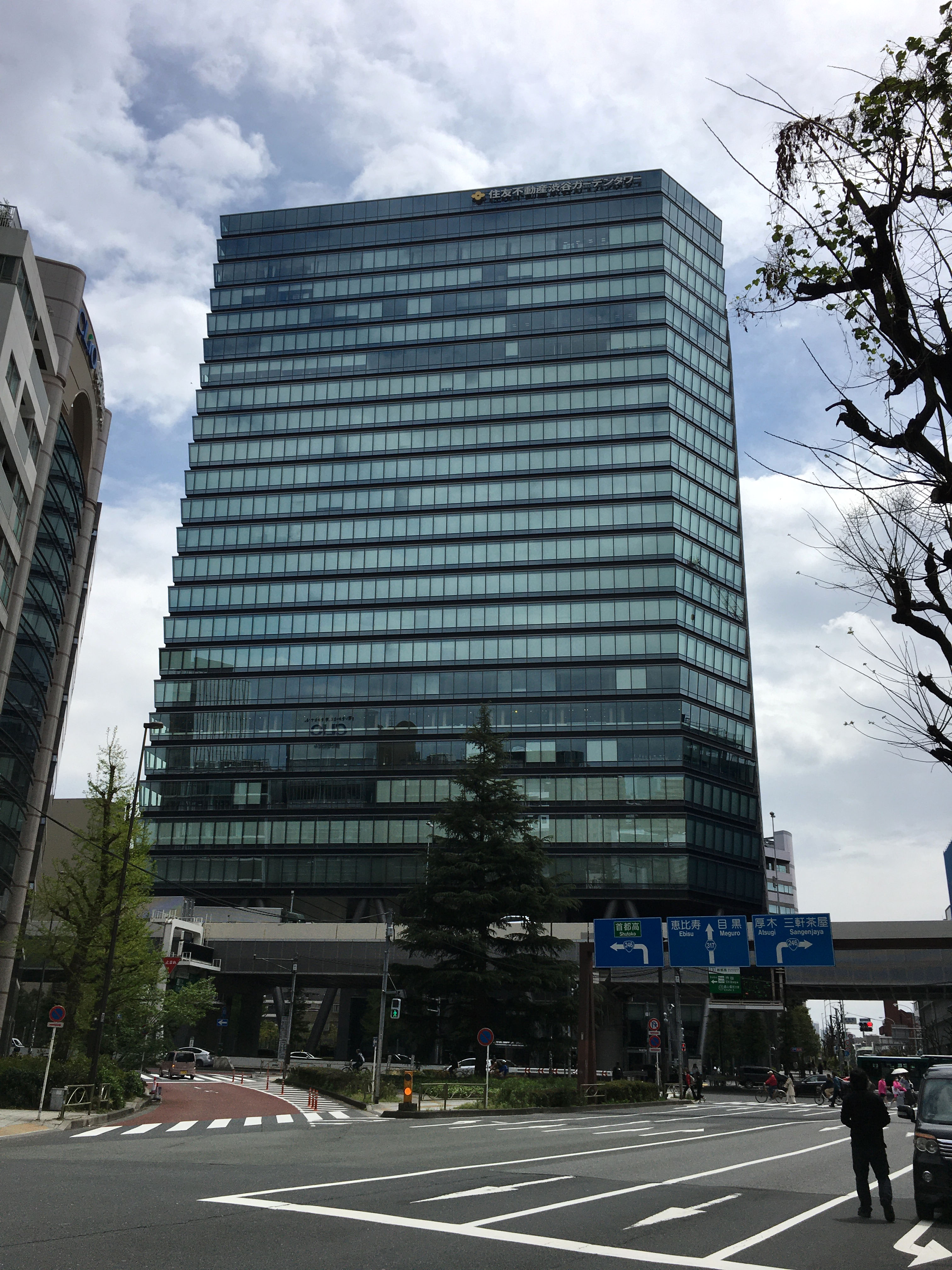
- Cygames shares its headquarters building (in Shibuya) with its parent company CyberAgent.
- Native name: 株式会社Cygames(サイゲームス)
- Romanized name: Kabushiki gaisha Saigēmusu
- Type: Subsidiary
- Industry: Video games; Manga; Anime
- Founded: May 9, 2011; 15 years ago
- Headquarters: Shibuya, Tokyo, Japan
- Number of locations: 14
- Key people: Koichi Watanabe (president); Yuito Kimura (Executive director); Kenichiro Takaki (General Manager, console division)
- Owner: CyberAgent (61.7%); DeNA (20%); Nintendo (5%)
- Number of employees: 3,644 (2023)
- Parent: CyberAgent
- Divisions: Osaka Cygames; Cygames Saga Studio; Cygames Korea; Cygames Taiwan; Cygames America; Cygames Europe; Cygames Singapore; Cygames Toronto
- Subsidiaries: CyDesignation, Inc.; BlazeGames, Inc.; WithEntertainment, Inc.; Citail, Inc.; Kusanagi, Inc.; LogicLinks, Inc.; Cymusic, Inc.; Cysharp, Inc.; Scoop Music Corporation; CyFoods, Inc.; CySphere, Inc.; flaggs, Inc.; Cygames Capital, Inc.; Tokyo Anime Artifacts Inc.; Complexor Inc.; Cygames AI Studio, Inc.; CygamesEdge
- Website: cygames.co.jp

Cygames, Inc. (Note: Japanese: 株式会社Cygames(サイゲームス), Hepburn: Kabushiki gaisha Saigēmusu) is a Japanese video game development studio established in 2011 by CyberAgent. Mobile and e-commerce company DeNA acquired a 24% stake in the studio in 2012, and Nintendo acquired another 5% stake in 2018, leaving CyberAgent with 69% of the shares and as such, they are the parent company of Cygames. From its formation, the company produced mobile games, initially on the Mobage platform, and from 2013 on Android and iOS. The company headquarters is located in Tokyo while other divisions are located in Osaka and Saga in Japan and Seoul, South Korea.

Key IPs include Umamusume: Pretty Derby (2021), Princess Connect! Re:Dive (2018), Shadowverse (2016), Granblue Fantasy (2014), The Idolmaster Cinderella Girls (2011, with Bandai Namco Entertainment), and Rage of Bahamut (2011). The company began development of console games in 2015.

In 2016, Cygames began funding anime adaptations for its mobile property and for new projects and adaptations for anime. During the same period, the company also entered the manga, music and design market in the same time period. It later announced the establishment of its own animation studio, CygamesPictures. The studio was later consolidated under CyberAgent through a direct share acquisition in February 2026.

== History ==
=== 2011–2016 ===
Cygames, Inc. was established May 9, 2011, by CyberAgent, a Japanese web services company. In 2012, DeNA purchased a 24% stake in Cygames. Shortly thereafter, the studio was chosen by Game Developer (formerly Gamasutra) as one of the top ten game developers of the year. In June 2012, Cygames founded CyDesignation, a company specialized in Design, Illustration, Game planning and Game development.

In March 2016, Cygames announced the establishment of its own anime production division and anime studio as a subsidiary known as CygamesPictures to do planning, production, and animation both for Cygames own IPs and original anime projects as well. In June 2016, Cygames announced the acquisition of the gaming and anime background studio Kusanagi.

=== 2016–2026 ===
In 2016, Cygames announced that it was developing Project Awakening, its first large-format title for consoles, as well as the establishment of their Osaka studio focused on console games.

In May 2017, Cygames and Kodansha announced that they formed a partnership to launch a new label called Cycomi to release volumes in print distributed by Kodansha for manga already published online by Cygames on its digital manga website called Cycomics, while Cygames' established its first overseas subsidiary, Cygames Korea. In April 2019, Cygames formed a new partnership with Hitotsubashi Group (Shogakukan and Shueisha).

On June 8, 2017, Cygames and its parent company CyberAgent announced that they jointly established CA-Cygames Anime Fund, a fund for investing in anime IP which will inject funds to the anime production committee to obtain the rights to stream anime videos on the Internet and produce games, with a total amount of funds to be three billion yen.

In 2017, Cygames founded its esports team, Cygames Beast, with Street Fighter players Daigo Umehara, Snake Eyez, and PR Balrog. In April 2018, a partnership with Nintendo was announced to develop the game Dragalia Lost, for the purpose of facilitating the partnership Nintendo will obtain approximately five percent of Cygames's issued stocks. In May 2018, Cygames announced the establishment of a subsidiary for music production and artist management called Cymusic.

In April 2021, Cygames announced the establishment of a subsidiary called CySphere which is focused on 3DCG production for anime and games. Cygames produced the anime The Marginal Service, which started airing in 2023.

In April 2023, Cygames opened two more international offices focused in marketing for its regions; one in Los Angeles called Cygames America and one in London called Cygames Europe.

In December 2024, the company established a subscription-based video game service called Cygames ID for the purpose of using various services.

In January 2026, the company established Cygames AI Studio, a subsidiary that develops and provides services and tools using artificial intelligence. In April 2026, CygamesPictures was renamed to CyPic after its consolidation as a subsidiary under CyberAgent through direct share acquisition in February 2026. In May 2026, Cygames acquired 3DCG and visual effects studio Griot Groove and a partnership within Rodeo FX's Mikros Animation focused on 3DCG animated industry.

In September 2026, Cygames announced the establishment of new subsidiary CygamesEdge, a new brand dedicated to small and mid sized games with planning and development support to publishing from the company.

== Sponsorships ==
In July 2017, Cygames became a sponsor of Italian football team Juventus; after a pause in 2019–20 following its signing of competitor Konami, the sponsorship was renewed in 2020. In January 2024, it became a sponsor of J.League football team Sagan Tosu.

As a tie-in with the Umamusume franchise, Cygames began to notably sponsor a number of international thoroughbred racing events, beginning with a title sponsorship of the Breeders' Cup Sprint in 2024. In 2025, Cygames sponsored the Unbridled Sidney Stakes, held as part of the Kentucky Derby weekend; the company also ran an infield booth at Churchill Downs, featuring demos of Cygames titles such as the then-upcoming English release of Umamusume: Pretty Derby. In June 2025, Cygames and France Galop announced that the company would become title sponsor of the Grand Prix de Paris.

On December 22, 2025, Japanese professional wrestling promotion New Japan Pro-Wrestling announced that Cygames would become the "Platinum Sponsor" of Wrestle Kingdom 20, featuring Hiroshi Tanahashi's last match. In addition, Tanahashi appeared in a TV commercial for Granblue Fantasy, portraying Beelzebub.

== Games developed ==
=== Mobile/web browser games ===
Title	Original release date	Publisher(s)	Platforms	JP	WW	Notes / Remarks	Ref.
Rage of Bahamut	JP: September 1, 2011	WW: DeNA	mobage	Yes	Terminated		
The Idolmaster Cinderella Girls	JP: November 28, 2011	JP: Bandai Namco Entertainment	mobage, Android, iOS, AndApp	Terminated	No	Servers were closed on March 30, 2023	
Saint Seiya Galaxy Card Battle; (Co-developed with DeNA)	JP: April 12, 2012	JP: DeNA	mobage	Terminated	No		
Disney Fantasy Quest; (Co-developed with DeNA)	JP: April 2012	JP: DeNA	mobage	Terminated	No		
Super Sentai Heroes	JP: April 26, 2012	JP: Bandai Namco Entertainment	mobage	Terminated	No		
Battle Spirits: Hasha no Houkou	JP: April 2012	JP: Bandai Namco Entertainment	mobage	Terminated	No		
Sakatsuku S World Stars	JP: June 2012	JP: Sega	mobage	Terminated	No		
Rekka no Honoo BURNING EVOLUTION; (Co-developed with Shogakukan)	JP: July 19, 2012	JP: Cygames	mobage	Terminated	No		
Tiger & Bunny: Lord of Hero	JP: July 27, 2012	JP: Bandai Namco Entertainment	mobage	Terminated	No		
Sangokushi Puzzle Taisen	JP: August 2013	JP: Cygames	Android, iOS	Terminated	No		
Knights of Glory	JP: November 2013	JP: Cygames	mobage	Terminated	No		
La Rudiaia Chronicle	JP: November 2013	JP: Cygames	mobage	Terminated	No		
Dragon Quest Monsters: Super Light	JP: January 23, 2014	JP: Square Enix	Android, iOS	Terminated	No	Servers were closed on January 31, 2024	
Granblue Fantasy	JP: March 10, 2014; WW: March 10, 2026	JP: Cygames	mobage, AndApp, GREE, DMM Games, Yahoo! Games, Android, iOS, Steam	Yes			
Battle Champs; (JP: Little Noah, Developed by Blaze Games)	WW: February 12, 2015	WW: Cygames	Android, iOS	Terminated			
Princess Connect!; (Co-developed with CyberAgent)	JP: February 18, 2015	JP: Cygames / CyberAgent	Ameba	Terminated	No		
LINE Paper Dash World	JP: March 2015	JP: Line Corporation	LINE GAME	Terminated	No		
The Idolmaster Cinderella Girls: Starlight Stage	JP: September 3, 2015	JP: Bandai Namco Entertainment	Android, iOS	Yes	No		
Rabitobi; (Developed by Citail)	JP: September 2015	JP: Cygames	Android, iOS	Terminated	No		
Kindai Mahjong All Stars Touhaiden; (Co-developed with Takeshobo)	JP: September 2015	JP: Cygames	Android, iOS	Terminated	No		
Shadowverse	WW: June 17, 2016	WW: Cygames	Android, iOS, DMM Games, Microsoft Windows (through Steam)	Terminated		Servers were closed on June 30, 2026	
Lost Order; (Co-developed with CyDesignation, PlatinumGames, Noisycroak)	JP: Unreleased	JP: Cygames	Android, iOS	Unreleased	No	Closed Beta Test was held in August 2017	
Sevens Story; (Co-developed with WithEntertainment Inc.)	JP: August 18, 2017	JP: Cygames	Android, iOS	Terminated	No	Closed on December 27, 2022	
Odin Crown; (Co-developed with GameJeans, CyDesignation)	JP: February 8, 2018	JP: Cygames	Android, iOS	Terminated	No		
Princess Connect! Re:Dive	JPN: February 15, 2018; TW: August 1, 2018; WW: January 19, 2021	JPN: Cygames; TW: So-net; CHN: Bilibili; WW: Crunchyroll Games	Android, iOS	Yes	Terminated	English servers were closed April 30, 2023	
Dragalia Lost	WW: September 27, 2018	WW: Nintendo	Android, iOS	Terminated		Servers were closed November 30, 2022	
World Flipper; (Co-developed with Citail)	JP: November 27, 2019; WW: 2021	JP: Cygames; TW: Gamania; WW: Kakao Games	Android, iOS	Terminated		JP servers were closed February 20, 2024. TW servers were closed May 24, 2024. WW servers were closed July 25, 2024. CN servers were closed August 15, 2025.	
Umamusume: Pretty Derby	JP: February 24, 2021; KR: June 20, 2022; TW: June 27, 2022; CN: August 30, 2023; WW: June 26, 2025	JP/WW: Cygames; KR: Kakao Games; TW: Komoe Game; CN: bilibili	Android, iOS, Microsoft Windows (through DMM Games and Steam)	Yes		Current Active Servers: Japan, South Korea, Taiwan, Mainland China and Global (5 in total)	
Shadowverse: Worlds Beyond	JP: June 17, 2025	JP: Cygames	Android, iOS, Microsoft Windows (through Steam, Epic)	Yes		The server was launched on June 17, 2025	

=== Console/PC games ===
Title	Original release date	Publisher(s)	Platforms
Wondership Q; (JP: Airship Q, Co-developed with Miracle Positive)	JP: November 19, 2015	WW: Cygames	PlayStation Vita
Wondership Q; (JP: Airship Q, Co-developed with Miracle Positive)	WW: July 18, 2016	WW: Cygames	Windows
The Idolmaster Cinderella Girls: Viewing Revolution	JP: March 13, 2016; SEA: April 21, 2017; WW: July 18, 2017	WW: Bandai Namco Entertainment	PlayStation VR
Anubis: Zone of the Enders -- M∀RS	WW: September 4, 2018	WW: Konami	PlayStation 4, Windows
Granblue Fantasy Versus; (Developed by Arc System Works)	AS: February 10, 2020; WW: March 6, 2020	JP: Cygames; AS: Sega; NA: Xseed Games; EU: Marvelous	PlayStation 4, Windows
Shadowverse: Champion's Battle	JP: November 5, 2020; WW: August 13, 2021	JP: Cygames; NA: Xseed Games; EU: Marvelous	Nintendo Switch
Little Noah: Scion of Paradise; (Co-developed with Grounding)	WW: June 28, 2022	WW: Cygames	Nintendo Switch, PlayStation 4, Windows
Little Noah: Scion of Paradise; (Co-developed with Grounding)	WW: November 2, 2023	WW: Cygames	Xbox One, Xbox Series X/S
Granblue Fantasy Versus: Rising; (Developed by Arc System Works)	WW: December 14, 2023	WW: Cygames	PlayStation 4, PlayStation 5, Windows
Granblue Fantasy: Relink; (Developed by Osaka Cygames)	WW: February 1, 2024	WW: Cygames	PlayStation 4, PlayStation 5, Windows, Nintendo Switch 2
Uma Musume Pretty Derby: Party Dash; (Developed by Arc System Works)	WW: October 4, 2024	WW: Cygames	Nintendo Switch, PlayStation 4, Windows
Project Awakening; (Developed by Osaka Cygames)	JP: TBA	JP: Cygames	PlayStation 4
Garnet Arena: Mages of Magicary	JP: TBA	JP: Cygames	Console (TBA)
Untitled Metal Max project	JP: TBA	JP: Cygames	Console (TBA)

=== CygamesEdge ===
A Brand used for small and mid size games, be it developed by Cygames or not, from planning and development support to publishing.

Title	Original release date	Publisher(s)	Platforms
Where the Seeds Fall (Co-developed with Zereo)	WW: November 5, 2026	WW: Cygames	PlayStation 5, Windows, Nintendo Switch 2
