= Abema =

Japanese online television website

AbemaTV, Inc.
- Website type: OTT platform
- Available in: Japanese; English
- Founded: April 1, 2015; 11 years ago
- Headquarters: Abema Towers, 40-1 Udagawachō, Shibuya, Tokyo, Japan
- Area served: Japan
- Owners: CyberAgent (55.2%); TV Asahi (36.8%)
- Key people: Susumu Fujita (president, and Representative Director of CyberAgent); Hiroshi Hayakawa (chairman, and chairman, CEO, president, and COO of TV Asahi)
- Products: Streaming media; Video on demand; Television on demand
- Services: Television production; Digital distribution
- Revenue: ▲¥13.56 billion (2024)
- Operating income: ▲¥24.80 billion (2024)
- Net income: ▲¥30.81 billion (2024)
- Website: abema.tv
- Registration: Optional
- Users: ▲6.52 million per month (as of February 2023)
- Launched: March 1, 2016 (Early access); April 11, 2016 (Full launch)
- Current status: Active

Abema (Japanese: アベマ; often stylized as all caps), formerly known as AbemaTV, (Note: アベマ ティービー) is a Japanese streaming video service owned and operated by AbemaTV, Inc., a joint venture between the internet company CyberAgent and the broadcaster TV Asahi. Launched in April 2016, the platform distinguishes itself from traditional video-on-demand (VOD) services by functioning primarily as a free ad-supported streaming television (FAST) network. It offers multiple real-time linear channels alongside a premium on-demand subscription tier and pay-per-view (PPV) capabilities.

The platform features a diverse lineup of programming, including a 24-hour news channel, original dating reality shows, anime, and specialized channels for subcultures like Shogi and Mahjong. Abema has also become a major destination for sports broadcasting in Japan, gaining widespread mainstream recognition after securing the rights to live stream all 64 matches of the 2022 FIFA World Cup for free. Its sports portfolio has expanded to include Major League Baseball, English Premier League, and major combat sports events.

== History ==
=== 2015: Launch ===
CyberAgent and TV Asahi announced on March 31, 2015, that they would jointly establish a fixed-rate video distribution company called AbemaTV in April of that year. The company became subsidiaries of CyberAgent, and Shun Fujita, the President of CyberAgent, was appointed as the President of AbemaTV.

CyberAgent and TV Asahi launched the service on April 11, 2016, having soft-launched some channels on March 1 of the same year. AbemaTV channels stream in real-time, similar to traditional linear TV, but missed programs can only be watched through its paid subscription tier, which was officially launched as the on-demand Abema Video feature in April 2017. The platform's linear model was deliberately chosen to differentiate it from standard video-on-demand services; Fujita noted that "finding content is a hassle" and aimed to provide an effortless viewing experience akin to traditional television.

Though CyberAgent also owns a similarly named social networking service called Ameba, they chose not to re-use the brand for AbemaTV due to the existence of a Canadian service called Ameba TV. According to Fujita, he wanted the name to convey that AbemaTV was an extension of Ameba, which had been around for over 10 years. However, he admitted that the name AbemaTV could be difficult to remember and pronounce, stating that he himself occasionally mispronounced it.

=== 2016–2018: Early programming and initial investments ===
To support original broadcasting, AbemaTV established Chateau Ameba, a dedicated production facility in Shibuya featuring six studios, operated by a joint production team from CyberAgent and TV Asahi. The platform also began acquiring outside programming, such as a May 2016 deal to stream 49 titles from TV Tokyo.

The platform grew rapidly among younger audiences, with 60% of its users falling between the ages of 18 and 34. It reached 5 million app downloads within its first three months, and surpassed 10 million downloads by November 2016, with weekly active users (WAU) approaching 3 million. To expand viewership to larger screens, a dedicated app for Amazon Fire TV was released in October 2016.

On May 7, 2017, AbemaTV's live show Win 10 Million Yen if You Beat Koki Kameda set a new record with 14.2 million views, resulting in a server outage. To capitalize on the popularity of combat sports, CyberAgent acquired DDT Pro-Wrestling in September 2017 to produce original content for the platform. Shortly after, the platform's Shogi channel drew massive attention, recording 12.42 million views for a match featuring shogi prodigy Sota Fujii. Abema's Shogi coverage also revolutionized the viewing experience by introducing real-time AI win-rate evaluations, a feature that became highly popular among viewers. AbemaTV offered the match footage for free on a special website. In November of the same year, AbemaTV announced that the 72 Hour Honne TV program featuring three former members of SMAP (Goro Inagaki, Shingo Katori, and Tsuyoshi Kusanagi) had garnered 74 million views. Anticipating high traffic, the company had increased server capacity fivefold prior to the broadcast, which featured over 130 guest appearances.

According to its financial statement as of September 30, 2017, AbemaTV recorded a net loss of 19.125 billion yen and a deficit of 28.38 billion yen in retained earnings. This deficit aligned with CyberAgent's strategy; Fujita had publicly committed to a 20 billion yen annual investment to grow the platform toward a goal of 10 million WAU. CyberAgent viewed the platform as a way to diversify its revenue away from its volatile mobile gaming business. Despite this, CyberAgent planned to continue investing in AbemaTV and expand into peripheral businesses.

In January 2018, AbemaTV began live broadcasting all six annual Grand Sumo tournaments. As the only alternative to the public broadcaster NHK, AbemaTV aimed to attract younger audiences by using female commentators and incorporating modern production elements like entrance music and custom graphics. The following month, the platform signed an annual sponsorship agreement with the Japan Golf Tour Organization, acquiring the naming rights to its developmental tour, which was rebranded as the AbemaTV Tour.

In October 2018, AbemaTV formed a capital and business alliance with major advertising agencies Dentsu and Hakuhodo DY Media Partners. The agencies acquired 5% and 3% stakes, respectively, to bolster AbemaTV's advertising sales and content procurement capabilities. That same month, CyberAgent acquired an 80% stake in the J2 League football club FC Machida Zelvia to secure exclusive sports content for the platform.

=== 2019–2021: Strategic shifts and pandemic growth ===
However, the heavy financial toll of the platform became apparent in early 2019. In January, CyberAgent issued its first downward earnings revision in 17 years due to a slowdown in its core advertising and gaming businesses, which had been subsidizing AbemaTV's deficits. This prompted Fujita to announce a comprehensive cost review while maintaining the 20 billion yen investment.

To improve profitability, the company began shifting its strategic focus from purely advertising-driven free broadcasts to increasing subscription revenue. In January 2019, CyberAgent disclosed that Abema Premium had 358,000 subscribers, a 4.5-fold increase from the previous year, and that the AbemaTV app had been downloaded 37 million times. Because the sports streaming service DAZN held the exclusive broadcasting rights for the J League, CyberAgent formed a partnership with DAZN in February 2019. This agreement allowed AbemaTV to live stream all of Machida Zelvia's home matches and broadcast highlight programs for the league. By April 2019, premium subscribers reached approximately 400,000, and the company stated its goal to balance the platform's advertising and subscription revenue ratio to 50:50. Fujita noted that while the initial goal was to create an internet-based linear TV service, most pre-recorded content had shifted to on-demand viewing, leaving news and sports as the primary linear broadcasts. He also stated that 95% of the platform's drama viewership was on-demand, prompting a shift toward a hybrid linear and on-demand model.

On February 25, 2019, AbemaTV began a trial service for viewers outside Japan, allowing access from the United States, Australia, Thailand, Canada, the United Kingdom, and Brazil using the iOS/Android app.

In March 2019, Abema announced a partnership with Dwango for content distribution. Through this collaboration, from April 1, selected AbemaTV programs became available for streaming on Niconico, the video-sharing platform operated by Dwango.

In mid-2019, the platform finally surpassed its long-term target of 10 million WAU multiple times. By October 2019, the app had reached 45 million cumulative downloads.

In January 2020, CyberAgent announced its Q1 earnings for the 2020 fiscal year (October to December 2019), stating that the media division was boosted by AbemaTV, with a revenue increase of 6.9% to 12.2 billion yen, although there was an operating loss of 5 billion yen. The number of paid members for Abema Premium increased to 593,000. In the same month, CyberAgent acquired Pro-Wrestling Noah. To streamline its growing combat sports portfolio, CyberAgent merged the promotion with DDT Pro-Wrestling in July 2020 to form a new consolidated subsidiary, CyberFight.

As of March 4, 2020, AbemaTV reached 50 million cumulative downloads on its smartphone app. Driven by the COVID-19 pandemic and high demand for live, uncut broadcasts of news conferences, the number of weekly active users reached a record high of over 14.9 million in early April 2020.

In April 2020, AbemaTV changed its name to Abema, reflecting the diversification of its services beyond linear streaming to on-demand streaming and other offerings. Concurrently, CyberAgent established a new subsidiary, Oen, to support online live streaming and tipping systems for the entertainment industry. This infrastructure proved vital in June 2020, when Abema broadcast a paid, audience-less live concert for the band Southern All Stars. The event sold 180,000 tickets and attracted an estimated 500,000 viewers, proving the viability of a Pay-Per-View (PPV) model. To further secure premium music and anime content for this model, CyberAgent increased its stake in the entertainment conglomerate Avex to 12% in May 2021, becoming its top shareholder.

=== 2021–2023: Major sports acquisitions and the 2022 World Cup ===
On June 29, 2021, Abema announced that it would live stream 166 Major League Baseball games starting from July 1. The focus of the live streaming was on teams that included Japanese players, such as the Los Angeles Angels, featuring Shohei Ohtani. Out of the 166 games, 120 were available for free. On March 31, 2022, Abema announced that it would continue live streaming games for the 2022 season, starting from the opening game on April 8. The service streamed a total of 324 games, including all games of the Angels, with 234 of them being available for free.

In March 2022, Abema made a landmark announcement that it had acquired the rights to livestream for free all 64 matches of the 2022 FIFA World Cup Qatar. Fujita pursued the rights to ensure the tournament remained viewable in Japan after traditional broadcasters balked at the escalating costs, which had reportedly exceeded 20 billion yen for the Qatar tournament compared to 550 million yen in 1998. Fujita acknowledged this was Abema's largest-ever investment, made possible by the massive financial success of CyberAgent's mobile game Uma Musume Pretty Derby. Rather than seeking direct profitability from the event, the goal was to elevate Abema's status as a major media platform and establish a high-quality streaming baseline.

Abema's PPV business saw another massive breakthrough in June 2022 with the broadcast of The Match 2022, a kickboxing event headlined by Tenshin Nasukawa and Takeru. The broadcast drew the highest single-day viewership in the platform's history and sold over 500,000 PPV tickets, firmly establishing combat sports as a highly lucrative pillar for the company.

Continuing its aggressive sports expansion, Abema announced in July 2022 that it had secured sub-licensing rights from SpoTV Now to broadcast 114 matches of the English Premier League for the 2022–23 season, offering half of the matches for free.

During the World Cup broadcast in November and December 2022, the platform experienced unprecedented traffic. The Japan vs. Croatia knockout stage match on December 6 drew over 20 million views, prompting Abema to implement its first-ever access restrictions to maintain server stability. According to Abema's official viewership data, the second most watched match was Japan vs. Costa Rica on November 17, and the third was Japan vs. Spain on December 2. A subsequent survey by MMD Labo revealed that 18% of Japanese viewers watched the tournament on Abema, demonstrating significant penetration as a sports broadcasting alternative to traditional television.

In February 2023, Abema entered into a content collaboration agreement with Netflix. As part of the partnership, Abema began producing new Netflix-exclusive installments of its reality series, including the Ōkami (Who is Wolf?) series and Falling in Love Like a Romantic Drama (Kiss Me Like a Princess). Netflix acquired the exclusive international streaming rights for these new series, allowing Abema to monetize its production capabilities globally. In the same month, Abema recorded a user base of 6.52 million people.

To retain the broader, older audience (aged 35 and above) acquired during the World Cup, Abema diversified its content in early 2023. In February, it launched a dedicated boxing channel offering free live broadcasts of major title matches. The following month, it introduced retro anime channels featuring classic titles from the 1980s to the 2000s, such as City Hunter. Furthermore, in June 2023, AbemaTV partnered with KDDI to leverage customer data analytics to provide personalized sports content recommendations. On March 22, 2023, Abema further announced that it would continue live streaming 324 MLB games for the 2023 season.

=== 2024–present: Profitability and intellectual property expansion ===
In February 2024, Abema launched a partnership with DAZN, introducing a subscription tier titled Abema de DAZN. This plan allows subscribers to watch a wide range of sports content distributed by DAZN, including the J League, La Liga, Serie A, Ligue 1, Formula One, and JLPGA tournaments. In April 2024, Abema expanded its sports content offerings through a partnership with Wowow, launching a plan called Abema de WowSpo. This plan provides access to Wowow-distributed sports content such as the UEFA Champions League, UEFA Europa League, NBA, French Open, US Open, and Super Rugby Pacific.

Despite its massive reach, Abema's cumulative operating losses had exceeded 100 billion yen by 2024. To establish a highly profitable foundation and reduce reliance on CyberAgent's gaming and advertising revenues, the company launched a special intellectual property (IP) task force in April 2024. The team aims to develop original, globally successful multimedia franchises to drive cross-media synergy and advertising revenue for Abema, preparing the platform for long-term sustainability ahead of Fujita's planned transition from the presidency in 2026. To immediately bolster this IP portfolio, CyberAgent acquired Nitroplus, the content production company behind Touken Ranbu, for 16.7 billion yen in June 2024.

In May 2024, Abema partnered with J Sports, launching a new subscription plan called Abema de J Sports. Subscribers gain access to a range of sports content provided by J Sports On-Demand, including Nippon Professional Baseball games hosted by the Hiroshima Toyo Carp, Chunichi Dragons, and Yokohama DeNA BayStars, as well as Japan Rugby League One, Super GT, and the Tour de France.

In June 2024, Abema live-streamed all 51 matches of the UEFA Euro 2024 for free. Driven by such major sports broadcasts and hit original series, Abema's weekly active users surpassed 30 million by September 2024. The following month, CyberAgent announced a historic milestone: the media division had finally achieved its first-ever annual operating profit, ending a nearly decade-long streak of deficits since Abema's launch. To further expand its subscriber base, the platform introduced a lower-priced, ad-supported premium subscription tier in October 2024.

In October 2025, Abema expanded its live sports offerings by broadcasting the prestigious Prix de l'Arc de Triomphe horse race for free. However, facing escalating broadcasting rights fees exacerbated by a weak yen, CyberAgent opted not to pursue streaming rights for the 2026 FIFA World Cup. This marked a strategic shift toward strict profitability, moving away from the massive expenditures seen during the 2022 tournament.

In November 2025, Abema released the co-produced original drama Scandal Eve, which reached number one on Netflix Japan. This success validated Fujita's strategy of utilizing global streaming platforms to benchmark Abema's production quality against international standards.

By the time Abema approached its 10th anniversary in early 2026, CyberAgent's Media and IP division had reached an annual revenue of 231.5 billion yen, surpassing the revenues of some traditional broadcast networks like TV Tokyo. The platform's sustained cultural relevance was heavily supported by its dating reality shows, such as Today, I Love You (Kyō, Suki ni Narimashita) and the Wolf series, which remained dominant viewing staples among Japanese youth.

== Programming ==
Abema offers a wide range of content across approximately 25 linear channels, combining original productions with acquired programming from TV Asahi and other partners.

- Original Series and Reality Shows: Abema is highly influential among Japanese teenagers and young adults, largely driven by its original dating reality shows such as the Who is the Wolf? (Ōkami) series and Today, I Love You (Kyō, Suki ni Narimashita). The platform also produces original dramas, sometimes co-produced with or exclusively licensed to global platforms like Netflix (e.g., Scandal Eve).
- Sports and Combat Sports: The platform has become a major destination for sports broadcasting in Japan. It streams Major League Baseball (MLB), English Premier League soccer, and all six annual Grand Sumo tournaments. Abema is particularly dominant in combat sports, broadcasting boxing world title matches and professional wrestling through CyberAgent's subsidiary, CyberFight (which includes DDT Pro-Wrestling and Pro-Wrestling Noah).
- News and Documentaries: Operated in collaboration with TV Asahi, the AbemaNews channel provides 24-hour news coverage. It gained widespread recognition for its uncut, unedited live broadcasts of emergency news and high-profile press conferences, offering an alternative to heavily edited traditional television news.
- Anime and Subcultures: Abema features multiple anime channels, ranging from late-night simulcasts to dedicated "retro anime" channels airing classic series from the 1980s to the 2000s. It also operates specialized channels for Shogi and Mahjong (M League). Its Shogi broadcasts notably introduced real-time AI win-rate evaluations, which became a staple for modern Shogi viewing in Japan.

=== List of channels ===
Channel name	Date launched	Description
ABEMA news	2016/3/1	24/7 News Channel; Changes to ABEMA emergency news during emergency broadcasts
Abema Select 1	2016/3/1	Streams various original programs, special programs, variety, anime, and drama produced by Abema
Abema Select 2	2016/4/11	An alternative channel to Abema Select, also broadcasts various programs as the original channel
Abema Gold	2016/4/11	Streams special programs in addition to various Japanese and every movies, sports programs, and other variety around the world
Abema Cinema	2016/4/11	Streams various Asian television dramas, movies, and Tokusatsu
C–World	2016/12/5	Streams various Chinese television dramas and movies
Animasia One	2018/4/1	24/7 anime channel; Focuses on new anime that aired in recent years; Animasia Two and Animasia Three also runs irregularly to provide more channels for anime streaming
Animasia LIVE	2018/4/1	Mainly streams late night anime; Variety programs that feature various anime related topics and voice actors and actresses
Everyone's Animasia	2018/4/1	Mainly streams family oriented anime and nostalgic or older anime
CM	2016/8/8	Streams only commercials published by Abema; Comments are disabled for this channel
QUEST by Discovery	2019/5/1	Channel in collaboration with Discovery Japan, mainly streams documentaries and other similar programs
M–Station	2016/4/11	Music videos for every music and songs from Japan and around the world; Also streams hip hop music videos and has a designated DJ for hip-hop music
Abema Radio	2017/11/20 (J-Wave Period); 2017/12/1 (Full Launch)	Broadcasts 9 different radio channels across the nation
FIGHTZ	2016/7/31	Streams MMA, pro wrestling, boxing and other combat sports related content
Abema Sports	2016/3/1 (First Launch); 2017/8/1 (Second Launch)	Streams various sports competitions and sports related programs
Keirin	2019/4/2	Streams live keirin competitions and keirin related content
Fishing	2016/3/1	Streams fishing related content; Available worldwide since April 2019
Shogi	2017/2/1	Streams shogi matches and shogi related content; Available worldwide since April 2019
Mahjong	2016/3/1	Streams Japanese Mahjong matches and Mahjong related content; Available worldwide since April 2019
Abema Overseas News	2019/2/25	Aimed at Japanese people who are overseas and out of the country as a news channel; Unavailable domestically within Japan

=== Other channels ===
These channels run on an inconsistent schedule

- Abema Sports Live – Live sports competitions
- Shogi Live – Live shogi competitions
- Mahjong Live – Live Mahjong competitions
- Ōsumo Live – Live Honbasho Sumo matches and content

== Business model and features ==
Unlike standard Video-on-Demand (VOD) platforms, Abema operates primarily on a linear, ad-supported streaming model designed to replicate the effortless viewing experience of traditional television. The platform utilizes a "freemium" hybrid strategy:

- Linear Broadcasting: Users can watch real-time linear channels for free without registering an account. These broadcasts are supported by video advertisements.
- Abema Premium: A paid subscription tier that grants users access to an extensive on-demand library (Abema Video), the ability to watch missed programs, an ad-free experience for VOD content, and a "chase playback" feature to rewind live broadcasts. In 2024, Abema introduced a lower-priced, ad-supported premium tier to expand its subscriber base.
- Pay-Per-View (PPV): Introduced in 2020, the PPV feature allows Abema to host exclusive, ticketed online events. This model has been highly lucrative for the platform, particularly for large-scale live music concerts and major combat sports events like The Match 2022.
- E-commerce Integration: Through subsidiaries like Oen, Abema integrates live commerce and tipping systems, allowing fans to purchase exclusive merchandise or directly support artists and creators during live broadcasts.

== Availability ==
Abema is accessible across a wide range of devices:

- Mobile and Web: iOS and Android smartphones and tablets, as well as standard web browsers.
- Smart TVs and Streaming Devices: Amazon Fire TV, Apple TV, Chromecast, and various smart TV operating systems (including Sony, Panasonic, and Toshiba models) feature dedicated Abema applications or dedicated remote buttons.
- Gaming Consoles: The service is available on the Nintendo Switch.
- Global Access: Initially restricted to Japan, Abema launched a trial service in February 2019 for international viewers. Select content, including news, Mahjong, and Shogi channels, is accessible in the United States, Australia, Thailand, Canada, the United Kingdom, and Brazil.

== See also ==
- Ameba (website)
- Internet TV
