= Project Awakening =

Upcoming video game

- Developer: Cygames Osaka
- Publisher: Cygames
- Director: Junji Tago
- Producer: Kenichiro Takaki
- Artist: Ryosuke Aiba
- Engine: Cyllista
- Platforms: PlayStation 4, PlayStation 5
- Genre: Action role-playing
- Modes: Single-player, multiplayer

Project Awakening is an upcoming action role-playing game in a fantasy setting being developed by Cygames, and initially announced for the PlayStation 4 in September 2018.

== History ==
Development of Project Awakening as a 'high-end console game' was announced at Cygames Next event (Tokyo) in August 2016, under development at Cygames Osaka studio.

A short gameplay video was shown in a closed session at E3 2018. The game was described as showing some influences from games such as Monster Hunter and Dragon's Dogma.

The game was officially announced as an action fantasy RPG in September 2018 for the PlayStation 4 system, with Junji Tago as the director, and Ryosuke Aiba as the art director.

Producer Kenichiro Takaki described the game as an open-world game, containing some RPG elements, with a focus on combat, including co-op multiplayer aspects - the game has a traditional high fantasy setting. The game was intended by Cygames as an attempt to break into the western console market - the name was also confirmed as only a working title. Takaki also discussed the possibility of the game becoming a PlayStation 5 title if development extended into the next generation of consoles.

In August 2019 a potential demo version was registered (16+) with the European ratings board PEGI.

In November 2021, new footage of Project Awakening was shown at a Cygames Tech Conference session.

In April 2024, CyberAgent (Cygames' parent company) released financial documents that listed Project Awakening under its future plans for upcoming games beyond FY2024, with a TBD release date.

In July 2026, Cygames President and CEO Koichi Watanabe stated in an interview with Famitsu magazine that development was "progressing steadily" and that the game was beginning to "take shape."

The website has remained as showing a PlayStation 4 logo as of 2026.
