= Red Ninja: End of Honor =

2005 video game

- Developer: Tranji Studios
- Publisher: Vivendi Universal Games (Note: Released in PAL regions under the Sierra Entertainment brand name)
- Producers: Yasuyuki Narushima; Taka Suzuki
- Designer: Kenichirō Takaki
- Programmer: Takaya Nakamura
- Artists: Tomás Rovina-Roquero; Tatsuaki Tsukamoto
- Writer: Shinsuke Sato
- Composer: Masanori Adachi
- Platforms: PlayStation 2, Xbox
- Release: PlayStation 2: JP: March 3, 2005; NA: March 30, 2005; EU: April 1, 2005; AU: April 20, 2005; Xbox: NA: March 29, 2005; EU: April 1, 2005
- Genre: Stealth action
- Mode: Single player

Red Ninja: End of Honor, known in Japan as Kurenai Shinobu: Kekka no Mai (紅忍 血河の舞, Kurenai Shinobu Kekka no Mai; "Crimson Ninja: Blood River Dance"), is a 2005 video game for the PlayStation 2 and Xbox platforms, created in a collaboration between the game developer Tranji Studios (now ERTAIN Corporation) and the film writer Shinsuke Sato. It was published by Vivendi Universal Games. The game's theme song "Foolish Dream" was performed by Yoko Ishida. The game was poorly received and was Tranji Studios' only published title.

== Gameplay ==
Red Ninja employs a third-person perspective with a limited rotatable camera, following the protagonist, Kurenai. Enemies are dispatched with either a kunai blade or fundo (a blunt iron weight) attachment to the tetsugen (鉄弦, "iron string", or "wire"). The tetsugen also has a hook attachment that allows Kurenai to swing to various places. Melee attacks can be performed with either the blade or fundo. By repeatedly annihilating enemies and avoiding injury, Kurenai can build her ninjutsu gauge, which allows her to enter a sort of "bullet time" in order to more efficiently eliminate enemies. When Kurenai is being chased by three or more enemies while targeting one of them, she can perform a powerful melee attack to annihilate all enemies in range.

However, as Kurenai is without armor and significant reach (enemies are armed with bows, spears, or katana), most battle encounters will either injure her seriously or kill her outright. It is best to avoid physical altercations either by sneaking, stealth-killing, or using Kurenai's feminine charm to eliminate threats. Stealth attacks are possible when Kurenai sneaks up on an enemy undetected or uses the blade to slice off an unaware enemy's head from a distance. A seduction stealth kill is also possible to perform on a single enemy: during such an attack, Kurenai will perform a vaguely suggestive activity and when the enemy approaches, will drag him down and kill him. Bodies of dead enemies can be dragged in order to conceal Kurenai's presence from the enemy, though only decapitated or defeated enemies can be dragged (in other words, Kurenai cannot pick up two separate halves of a body to hide them). The game is impossible to complete without killing people.

Kurenai has several different methods of moving. In addition to running, walking, and jumping, she can stealth walk in order to creep up on enemies or move behind low barriers. She will stealth run if an enemy is targeted, unaware of her presence, and she is being made to run. Kurenai can also wall-jump, that is to say jump from surface to surface, up to three times in order to surmount large obstacles. Kurenai can flatten herself against certain walls, cling to ledges, hang upside down from her tetsugen to kill people, and if she is running fast enough, can zoom straight up walls until she either runs out of momentum or smashes into something. Wall running cannot be done on all walls, and can only be done if Kurenai is running at full speed. If Kurenai is crouching, she can also roll rapidly. When faced with tight, narrow spaces, Kurenai can dislocate her right shoulder in order to go through.

Areas can be navigated by looking at the (anachronistic) sonar circle in the corner and colored icons signal caution, alert, and full-out alarm/attack modes. Enemies are represented by arrowheads, with the point of the arrow being their direction of vision, while a white X indicates the general direction Kurenai should go in order to complete the mission.

== Plot ==
The game is set in 16th century Japan during the Sengoku period. After a young Kurenai witnessed the brutal execution of her father Ryo by the Black Lizard clan, the girl herself was brutally hung with a tetsugen from a tree and left to die. Miraculously, she survived and was rescued and adopted into a ninja clan where she obtains complete mastery of her adopted weapon, the tetsugen. Pledging her undying loyalty to her new family, Kurenai now lives to avenge her father's death and will go to any means necessary.

=== Characters ===
- Kurenai (motion capture acting by Mary-Beth Macaluso and voice by Youki Kudoh): She is an orphan who has just come out of ninja training, and as a result sometimes lets her heart rule her actions instead of the ninja code. Her father is the creator of the gun blueprints that she is sent to retrieve. Her name literally means "crimson."
- Akemi: Kurenai's friend and fellow ninja, often working with her as a team. Akemi is younger and smaller than Kurenai and is responsible for the ninja butterflies that Kurenai can consult throughout the game. She is a cheerful girl who follows Kurenai around like a younger sister and occasionally aids her on missions.
- Mochizuki Chiyome: Kurenai's sensei. Devoted to Lord Shingen Takeda, she is one of the most accomplished members in Lord Takeda's clan. She is stern but also motherly toward Kurenai and Akemi. According to Zenzo, the bond between Chiyome and Lord Takeda is stronger than that between Lord Takeda and his wife. Whether this indicates romantic attachment or a close professional relationship, Chiyome is nevertheless involved in many of Lord Takeda's ideas.
- Shingen Takeda: Lord of the Takeda clan. He always appears in armor and sits behind a screen that largely obscures his features. He is one of the chief warlords in the fight against Nobunaga Oda and strongly supports his ninja. He appears to be close friends with Chiyome, but never speaks throughout the course of the game. It is later revealed that he has been dead during the entire course of the game. None of the characters pronounce his name properly in the English version.
- Katsuyori Takeda: Son of Lord Shingen, he speaks for his father during briefings and is never seen without a long-handled fan. He has an arrogant attitude that Chiyome hints at, has an inferiority complex since he is seen as the weakest son of a strong father.
- Ginbei: The assistant to Kurenai's father Ryo and creator of machinegun blueprints after Ryo dies. He is unaware that Kurenai has survived the assault of the Black Lizard clan. Initially appearing as an ineffectual intellectual in heavy glasses, he has a hard and ambitious side.
- Zenzo: Kurenai's fellow ninja who eventually becomes a de facto leader of the Takeda ninja. He is a very traditional ninja but appears to have feelings for Kurenai, who looks up to him, as he gave her a tantō that has been in his family for generations.
- Nobunaga Oda: The leader of the Oda clan and the archenemy of the Takeda clan.

== Release ==
A picture of Kurenai, wearing "her signature crimson miniskirt robe", appeared in the October 2004 issue of Playboy. In Japan, the promotional campaign included the use of the Cafe & Kitchen Cos-Cha maid café in Akihabara between February and June (decorations, unique menu, and waitresses dressed up as Kurenai), and the race queen Yuri Hashizume (Yuri Isakura) visiting editorial departments of various Japanese gaming magazines while cosplaying as Kurenai. The game was released in Japan on March 3, 2005; North American, European, and Australian releases followed in 2005.

== Reception ==
Reception

Aggregate score
Aggregator	Score	
Aggregator	PS2	Xbox
Metacritic	47/100	46/100

Review scores
Publication	Score	
Publication	PS2	Xbox
Edge	5/10	N/A
Electronic Gaming Monthly	4.17/10	4.17/10
Famitsu	27/40	N/A
Game Informer	3.75/10	3.75/10
GameSpot	5.4/10	5.4/10
GameZone	6.9/10	7/10
IGN	4/10	4/10
Official U.S. PlayStation Magazine	2.5/5	N/A
Official Xbox Magazine (US)	N/A	3/10
X-Play	2/5	2/5

The game received "generally unfavorable reviews" on both platforms according to the review aggregation website Metacritic. Ed Lewis of IGN wrote that "the only honor is in ending any thought of this game" as it is a proof that "a ninja game can scrape the bottom of the barrel". According to Lewis, "Red Ninja is a comedy of errors, but without humor. From the camera to the movement to the over-powered tetsugen to the uninspired nature of pretty much everything this game disappoints in so many different ways." According to Alex Navarro of GameSpot, "even for those diehard ninja fans out there, Red Ninja is probably not a game that's worth your time or money." In Japan, Famitsu gave the PlayStation 2 version a score of two sevens, one six, and one seven for a total of 27 out of 40.

In 2009, GamesRadar included Red Ninja among the games "with untapped franchise potential", commenting: "In the hands of a proficient developer, Red Ninja could be so much more than a poorly executed Tenchu knockoff. After all, who wouldn't want to play a game that contained a properly executed ninja seduction/stealth kill mechanic?" FHM Philippines placed Kurenai second on their list of most memorable hitmen in gaming in 2009 and also included her among the nine "sexiest ninja babes in games" in 2012, comparing her to Misa Campo. UGO Networks featured her on their list of 25 "hot ninja girls" in 2011 and GameHall's Portal PlayGame ranked her as the 43rd game "chick" in 2014.
