= Valkyrie Drive =

Japanese anime media franchise

- Cover of first anime volume featuring main characters Mirei Shikishima (left) and Mamori Tokonome (right)

バルキリードライブ (Varukirī Doraivu)
- Genre: Action, yuri, supernatural
- Created by: VALKYRIE DRIVE PROJECT
- Anime television series

Valkyrie Drive: Mermaid
- Directed by: Hiraku Kaneko
- Produced by: Takuro Hatakeyama; Shō Tanaka; Noritomo Isogai; Kazuo Ōnuki
- Written by: Yōsuke Kuroda
- Music by: Hiroaki Tsutsumi
- Studio: Arms
- Licensed by: Crunchyroll
- Original network: AT-X, Tokyo MX, Sun TV, KBS, TV Aichi, BS11
- Original run: October 10, 2015 – December 26, 2015
- Episodes: 12 + 6 specials
- Video game

Valkyrie Drive: Bhikkhuni
- Developer: Meteorise
- Publisher: JP: Marvelous; NA/EU: PQube; Microsoft Windows: WW: Marvelous Europe
- Produced by: Kenichirō Takaki
- Genre: Hack and slash
- Platform: PlayStation Vita; Microsoft Windows
- Released: JP: December 10, 2015; EU: September 30, 2016; NA: October 11, 2016; Microsoft Windows: WW: June 20, 2017
- Video game

Valkyrie Drive: Siren
- Developer: Mobage, GREE
- Publisher: Marvelous
- Produced by: Kenichirō Takaki
- Genre: Card battle
- Platform: iOS, Android
- Released: December 2015
- icon

Valkyrie Drive (ヴァルキリードライヴ, Varukirī Doraivu) is a Japanese anime media franchise created by Marvelous, which was announced at the AnimeJapan convention in March 2015. The franchise consists of three projects; Mermaid (マーメイド, Māmeido), an anime television series produced by Arms Corporation, which aired in Japan from October to December 2015; Bhikkhuni (ビクニ, Bikuni), a PlayStation Vita game released on December 10, 2015, in Japan with a Western release in 2016 and a Microsoft Windows version in 2017; and Siren (セイレーン, Seirēn), a social game for iOS and Android devices released in December 2015.

== Plot ==
Each of the series revolves around girls who have been infected with a mysterious virus known as the A Virus (Armed Virus). These girls are divided into two classes; Extars (エクスター, Ekusutā), who can transform into weapons when sexually aroused, and Liberators (リブレイター, Ribureitā), who have the power to wield an Extar's weapon form, known as Liberator Arms, through a process known as Drive. These girls are brought to separate islands to spend their days completely isolated from the rest of the world until the islands' Observers, authorized by the government Organisation AAA, ostensibly deem them ready to rejoin society again.

Mermaid follows an Extar named Mamori Tokonome who forms a partnership with the Liberator Mirei Shikishima. Bhikkhuni follows two sisters, Rinka and Ranka Kagurazaka, who are infected with a variation of the A Virus known as the V Virus.

== Characters ==
=== Mermaid Island ===
Mamori Tokonome (処女 まもり, Tokonome Mamori)
Voiced by: Mikako Izawa (Japanese); Megan Shipman (English)
The series' protagonist. Mamori is an innocent and naive sixteen-year-old girl who, at a young age, overheard her parents talking about her illness. However, she didn't think much of it until she was abducted and sent to Mermaid island, where she became Mirei's partner. She is often made fun of because her surname is written with the same kanji for "virgin" (処女, shojo). She is an Extar whose transformation is a large curved sword, though she later gains the power to transform into a double-pointed spear through the Valkyrie Effect. Unknown to herself, her power level is far greater than Mermaid's other inhabitants; as such, and with her compatibility with Mirei, she is able to unleash the Valkyrie Effect, the ultimate manifestation of the Armed Virus' powers which can manipulate—or even cancel—its effects in other carriers.
Mirei Shikishima (敷島 魅零, Shikishima Mirei)
Voiced by: Yuka Iguchi (Japanese); Morgan Garrett (English)
An observant and intelligent Liberator who becomes Mamori's partner after arriving on the island with her. She doesn't speak much but is very protective of Mamori and is shown to be very powerful. Despite having a mature appearance, she is actually a year younger than Mamori. She is a former Soldier (code name C7), a member of an experimental military unit which tested Mirei and her partner's A Virus powers for warfare applications. As a result, Mirei's body contains a special ability known as Enhance, implanted nano-cybernetics which grant her enhanced strength but causes a great deal of stress on her body. Because of her unwillingness to kill a defenseless enemy, Mirei was set to be terminated, but was saved by one of the scientists who gave her her enhancement. Driven into isolation, Mirei found in Mamori a new reason to live.
Meifon Sakura (櫻 美鳳, Sakura Meifon)
Voiced by: Yurika Kubo (Japanese); Brittney Karbowski (English)
A crafty girl who speaks Kansai dialect and is often seen wearing a partial cowboy outfit. She acts as a double agent, technically being a resident of Veste while sneaking goods to deliver to the girls residing in Atelier Torino. She often holds bets and scams in order to make money which she can use to activate her Extar ability in the form of a golden mech suit. However, the use of her power consumes both the money and her clothes, leaving her in the nude when her power shuts off.
She is known as Meifeng Sakura in the Funimation dub.
Akira Hiiragi (柊 晶, Hīiragi Akira)
Voiced by: Yuna Yoshino (Japanese); Janelle Lutz (English)
The benevolent Governor of Mermaid, and the founder of Wärter (German for "keeper(s)"), the island's peace-keeping force. While believed by everyone on the island to be the only male resident on Mermaid, she is actually a woman asked by her mother to act like a man in order to stay safe. For physical protection, her mother also provided her with an artificial Extar named Sri. Only Torino and Mirei knew her true gender until she was exposed by Momoka.
Charlotte Scherzen (シャルロット・シャルゼン, Sharurotto Sherzen)
Voiced by: Asami Seto (Japanese); Monica Rial (English)
The series' first antagonist, a member of Wärter who is cruel and violent. She has a harem of Extars—called the Adel ("nobility")—that she uses all at once when fighting her opponents. She strives to bring Mermaid under her thumb, but is later used as a willing puppet Governor by Momoka.
Kasumi Shigure (時雨 霞, Shigure Kasumi)
Voiced by: Masumi Tazawa (Japanese); Trina Nishimura (English)
The Commandeur ("commander") of Wärter who is opposed to Charlotte's despotic regime over Mermaid's residents. She started fighting without using an Arm as her partner, Hibiki, had been left in shock following an assault by a girl gang shortly upon their arrival on the island. Rescued by Akira, she was appointed as the commander of the newly founded Wärter to restore order on Mermaid.
Hibiki Kenjo (見城 ひびき, Kenjo Hibiki)
Voiced by: Ayaka Suwa (Japanese); Alexis Tipton (English)
Kasumi's girlfriend and partner. She has been so traumatized by her experience at Mermaid that she refused to leave her room. She decided to join the fight at the very end with the purpose of not letting anyone else suffer the same way she did, apologizing to Kasumi for leaving her fight alone the whole time.
Rain Hasumi (蓮実 レイン, Hasumi Rein)
Voiced by: Saori Ōnishi (Japanese); Tia Ballard (English)
A mysterious woman who together with her lover Lady J forms the duo Lady Lady. Like Mirei and Momoka, they are revealed to be A Virus carriers formerly used by the government who served as Nafrece spies instead as Soldiers, but eventually deserted. As a hybrid of Liberator and Extar, she is able to transform into a powerful beam cannon with variable settings which can, among other effects, disrupt an Extar's powers.
Lady J (レディー・J, Redī J)
Voiced by: Azumi Asakura (Japanese); Jamie Marchi (English)
Rain's extremely busty lover and partner who is also an Extar and Liberator hybrid. She is able to transform into a motorbike without her partner's aid. When both girls' Extar forms are combined, they turn into a powerful jet. Her breasts are an N-cup and her areola and nipples bounce out.
Momoka Sagara (相良 百華, Sagara Momoka)
Voiced by: Hitomi Harada (Japanese); Jad Saxton (English)
The series' second main antagonist. Like Mirei, she is a Soldier (code name A3) and her former partner. She is sent to Mermaid alongside her allies in order to locate the source of the Valkyrie Effect. She also harbors a deep hatred of Mirei for "abandoning" her, which turned her into a homicidal maniac, and has volunteered herself for further enhancement; they enable her to transform her chosen Extar into any weapon of her choice and absorb A Virus carriers to enhance her Arm's power.
Torino Kazami (風巳 とりの, Kazami Torino)
Voiced by: Kikuko Inoue (Japanese); Cynthia Cranz (English)
A kind-hearted woman who runs Atelier Torino, a town for girls who either do not want to or are unable to stay at Veste. In the final episode, she is exposed as the government-appointed Observer of Mermaid island.
Nimi Minimi (未弐身 にみ, Minimi Nimi)
Voiced by: Minami Takahashi (Japanese); Bryn Apprill (English)
An Extar who is partners with her girlfriend Noe. Rather than take the shape of a weapon, her Arm form causes her to grow to gigantic sizes.
Noe Ōya (大屋乃絵, Ōya Noe)
Voiced by: Rie Takahashi (Japanese); Skyler McIntosh (English)
Nimi's girlfriend who gets arrested by the Wärter after Nimi runs away, as they were believed to be incompatible.
D5 and E9 (D5とE9, D5 and E9)
Voiced by: Asami Shimoda (Japanese); Carli Mosier (English) (D5)
Voiced by: Marika Kōno (Japanese); Leah Clark (English) (E9)
Like Momoka, D5 and E9 are Soldiers who have infiltrated Mermaid's Wärter until Momoka was sent to the island.
Sri (シュリ, Shri)
An Artificial Extar, a combination of the A Virus and cloned human tissue specifically bred for military combat, which was given to Akira Hiragi by her mother for her protection.

=== Bhikkhuni Island ===
Rinka Kagurazaka (神楽坂 倫花, Kagurazaka Rinka)
Voiced by: Aya Suzaki
Rinka and her sister, Ranka, are the main characters of Bhikkhuni. They are infected with a variation of the A Virus known as the V Virus, which gives them the powers of both an Extar and a Liberator simultaneously, allowing either one to wield the other's weapon form.
Ranka Kagurazaka (神楽坂 乱花, Kagurazaka Ranka)
Voiced by: Kanae Itō
Momo Kuzuryū (九頭竜 桃, Kuzuryū Momo)
Voiced by: Yōko Hikasa
Mana Inagawa (猪名川 マナ, Inagawa Mana)
Voiced by: Yumi Hara
Manpukumaru Chang (満腹丸 ちゃん, Manpukumaru Chan)
Voiced by: Ayano Yamamoto
Viola (ヴァイオラ, Vaiora)
Voiced by: Yū Kobayashi
Koharu Tsukikage (月影 小春, Tsukikage Koharu)
Voiced by: Risa Taneda
Echigoya (越後屋)
Voiced by: Ai Kakuma
Rijicho (理事長)
Voiced by: Asami Imai

=== Siren ===
Setsuna Kisaragi (如月 刹那, Kisaragi Setsuna)
Voiced by: Ayaka Ōhashi
Urara Sashō (沙粧 うらら, Sashō Urara)
Voiced by: Azusa Tadokoro
Azalea Egner (アゼリア・エグナー, Azeria Egunā)
Voiced by: Natsumi Takamori
Ariel Foch (アリエル・フォンシュ, Arieru Fonshu)
Voiced by: Yurika Endō
Kotona Misaki (美咲 ことな, Misaki Kotona)
Voiced by: Tomoyo Kurosawa
Konoe Kirihara (桐原 このえ, Kirihara Konoe)
Voiced by: Yuiko Tatsumi
Yuria Kōno (高野 ユリア, Kōno Yuria)
Haruko Hibiki (響 晴子, Hibiki Haruko)
Vivian Sinclair (ヴィヴィアン・シンクレア, Vivian Shinkurea)
Holiday Clemente (ホリディ・クレメンティ, Horidi Kurementi)
Melody Appleton (メロディ・アップルトン, Merodi Appuruton)
Sanary Lois (サナリィ・ロア, Sanaryi Roa)
Fina Kress (フィーナ・クレス, Fīna Kuresu)
Elena Miranda (エレナ・ミランダ, Erena Miranda)
Youbai Niang (遊白 娘)
Miharu Sasahara (笹原 美晴, Sasahara Miharu)

== Media ==
=== Video games ===
Valkyrie Drive: Bhikkhuni is developed by Meteorise for the PlayStation Vita and was released in Japan on December 10, 2015. PQube released the game in Europe on September 30, 2016, and North America on October 11, 2016. The game was refused classification in Australia. Valkyrie Drive: Siren, a social game, was launched for iOS and Android devices in December 2015. It was later shut down on July 7, 2016.

=== Anime ===
Valkyrie Drive: Mermaid, the anime portion of the franchise, aired in Japan from October 10 to December 26, 2015, receiving an uncensored broadcast on AT-X. Produced by Kadokawa, Showgate, AT-X, Marvelous, Genco and Arms Corporation, the series was directed by Hiraku Kaneko, who also designed the characters. Yōsuke Kuroda handled series composition and Hiroaki Tsutsumi composed the music. The opening theme is "Overdrive" by Hitomi Harada, while the ending theme is "Super Ultra Hyper Miracle Romantic" (スーパーウルトラハイパーミラクルロマンチック, Sūpā Urutora Haipā Mirakuru Romanchikku) by Yuka Iguchi and Mikako Izawa.

The series was licensed for streaming in North America by Funimation, while Madman Entertainment simulcasted the series on AnimeLab in Australia. Following Sony's acquisition of Crunchyroll, the series was moved to Crunchyroll. In the UK, the series has been denied classification, effectively banning it from being released, due to falling foul of the Video Recording Act 1984.

==== Episode list ====
No.	Official English title (Note: All English titles are taken from Funimation.) Original Japanese title	Directed by	Written by	Original release date
1	"I'm Gonna Burst"; Transliteration: "Watashi, chirasaremasu" (Japanese: 私、散らされます)	Taiji Kawanishi	Yōsuke Kuroda	October 10, 2015
Mamori Tokonome, a girl who was diagnosed with an irregularity in her body, is captured by agents and taken to a remote island known as Mermaid. There, she is attacked by two girls named Miyasato and Kouzuki, the former being a Liberator who arouses the latter, an Extar, to transform her into a gun known as a Liberator Arm. Just then, another girl by the name of Mirei Shikishima arrives on the island, protecting Mamori by transforming her into a sword, allowing her to defeat Miyasato and Kouzuki and escape to the jungle. Arriving at a white castle, Mamori and Mirei are trapped in a coliseum, they are confronted by another Liberator, Saejima, who uses one of her masochistist slave girls to bring out a ball-and-chain Liberator Arm. Just as the two are cornered, Mirei once again uses arousal to transform Mamori into the sword Liberator Arm, allowing her to defeat Saejima in an instant.
2	"The Wedding Aisle"; Transliteration: "Vājin rōdo" (Japanese: ヴァージン・ロード)	Odahiro Watanabe	Yōsuke Kuroda	October 17, 2015
Following their battle, Mamori and Mirei are restrained by two other Liberators. While Mirei is locked away in a disciplinary room, Mamori wakes up in the care of Kasumi Shigure, commander of the Wärter, who explains that all the girls on the island are carriers of something called the Armed Virus, who are divided into Extars, who can transform into weapons, and Liberators, those who can wield them. Charlotte Scharsen, one of the Liberators from before, then informs Mamori that she is to undergo a wedding ceremony to find a suitable Liberator as a partner. As Mamori is arranged to be partnered with a trainer named Tomomi Nukui, Meifon Sakura, a girl who enjoys running bets on Liberator fights, follows order to set Mirei free, allowing her to come to Mamori's rescue. Undergoing a Drive once again, Mamori and Mirei escape to the beach, where they properly introduce themselves to each other.
3	"Zero Arm"; Transliteration: "Zero āmu" (Japanese: ゼロ・アーム)	Mitsutaka Noshitani	Yōsuke Kuroda	October 24, 2015
Mamori and Mirei are picked up by Meifon, who takes them to a small town run by Torino Kazumi, who takes care of girls who don't want to or are unable to stay at Veste. Meanwhile, despite Kasumi's attempts to keep it a secret, Charlotte learns about Meifon repeatedly stealing supplies from Wärter, commanding Kasumi to go and apprehend her. The next day, as Kasumi arrives in Torino Town to search for Meifon, Mirei offers to take responsibility for the theft and turn herself in. When Charlotte prepares to attack her, however, Mamori comes to Mirei's aid, helping her to fight back. Just as they are overwhelmed by Kasumi, who doesn't use an Arm to fight, they are aided by two women, Rain Hasumi and Lady J, who together form the duo of Lady Lady.
4	"Governor"; Transliteration: "Guverunea" (Japanese: グヴェルネア)	Hiroaki Nishimura	Yōsuke Kuroda	October 31, 2015
Surrounded by Wärter soldiers, Rain kisses Mirei to transform into the Disarmment Buster Arm that forces Extars out of their weapon states, while Lady J uses her skills as a motorcycle to fight back Charlotte and Kasumi. Just then, Akira Hiiragi, Wärter's governor and allegedly the only male on Mermaid, arrives to prove Mirei's innocence, having encountered Meifon earlier, and recalls the troops, much to Charlotte's ire. After Lady Lady take their leave, Mamori starts taking an interest in Akira, much to Mirei's dismay, while Akira tells Kasumi about his interest in Lady Lady, who function differently from the usual Liberator partnership. Later that night, Mamori follows a vision of Akira into the jungle, unaware that it is an illusion set by one of Charlotte's followers to try and put her in Arm form to kidnap her. However, Mirei arrives in the nick of time, managing to overcome her opponent's mental attacks and defeat her.
5	"Giant Girl, Little Heart"; Transliteration: "Jaianto gāru, ritoru hāto" (Japanese: ジャイアント・ガール、リトル・ハート)	Taiji Kawanishi	Gō Zappa	November 7, 2015
Mirei, Mamori, and Kasumi come across a girl named Nimi Minimi who, after running away from the castle when Charlotte tried to force her and her girlfriend Noe Oya into separate partnerships, somehow wound up in a giant form. Nimi is brought to Atelier Torino, where she manages to get along with everyone despite her gigantic form. The next day, as Nimi suddenly grows even larger, Mamori encourages her to go and see Noe and tell her how she feels. This naturally causes panic as she approaches the castle, with Kasumi's attempts to stop her only causing her to grow larger still. Before Charlotte can attack, Mirei and Mamori break Noe out of detention so that she can reach Nimi, allowing her to return to normal size. Akira then explains that the growth was a cause of Nimi's powers, which had simply taken a while to activate, allowing Nimi and Noe to remain partners with each other.
6	"No Money, No Life"; Transliteration: "Nō manē nō raifu" (Japanese: ノー・マネー ノー・ライフ)	Odahiro Watanabe	Gō Zappa	November 14, 2015
Meifon works with her partners in crime, Hyouko Yundou and Futaba Kirii, to steal more goods from Veste while also making money from gambling. Feeling she can make a killing from bets, Meifon arranges for Mirei to enter a beauty pageant being held at the Mermaid Festival. On the day of the festival, Charlotte gets chosen as the winner, with Meifon deducing that Hyouko and Futaba had switched out the ballots in order to kiss up to Charlotte. Discovering what had happened, Mirei and Mamori face off against Hyouko and Futaba's decoys, while Meifon uses her love of money to transform herself into an Arm to fight against the real thing, coming out victorious. With Hyouka and Futaba's scheme exposed, Charlotte is disqualified from the pageant while Meifon delivers the prize to Mamori.
7	"For Faith"; Transliteration: "Shinjiru tame ni" (Japanese: 信じるために)	Mitsutaka Noshitani	Gō Zappa	November 21, 2015
Stressed from work, Akira, who is revealed to be a woman, sneaks out to spend some time with Torino, keeping her identity a secret from Mamori and Mirei. Spending the night in Mamori's room, she recalls how her mother arranged for her to act like a man upon arriving at Mermaid in order to stay safe. The next day, some rebellious girls take one of the Ritters hostage in the building where Akira is keeping her male clothes. As Charlotte and Kasumi argue over how to approach the situation, Mamori, Mirei, and Akira follow a secret passage into the building in order to rescue the hostage, only to fall into a trap laid out by the Ritter, who was sick of her current life. With Mirei knocked out, Mamori has Akira drive with her in order to stop the terrorists, briefly exposing her identity to Mirei before leaving the scene.
8	"Valkyrie Effect"; Transliteration: "Varukirī efekuto" (Japanese: ヴァルキリー・エフェクト)	Fujiaki Asari; Masayuki Matsumoto	Yōsuke Kuroda	November 28, 2015
Lady Lady are asked by Akira to investigate a location said to contain the secret of Mermaid, bringing Mamori, Mirei, and Meifon along with them. Uncovering a hidden cave, the girls find an underground construction plant, where they are attacked by an Artificial Arm that Mirei finds all too familiar. Unable to drive with Mamori following the ordeal of her attack, Mirei unleashes the true ability hidden in her body to fight the Arm, but is still overpowered by it. However, Mamori, determined to protect Mirei, brings out enhanced abilities of her own and transforms into an enhanced arm, allowing Mirei to defeat the Arm. As the girls manage to escape the facility as it is destroyed, another island, having detected the Valkyrie Effect coming from the battle, sends a girl named Momoka Sagara to Mermaid to investigate.
9	"Takeover"; Transliteration: "Teikuōbā" (Japanese: テイクオーバー)	Taiji Kawanishi	Yōsuke Kuroda	December 5, 2015
Momoka arrives on Mermaid under the guise of a new transfer, quickly demonstrating her Extar abilities and becoming a part of Charlotte's Adel team. Quickly deducing Akira's true gender, Momoka manipulates Charlotte into confronting Akira in a battle in order to expose the truth. Noticing something about Momoka's power, Akira brings out the full strength of her Artificial Arm, Sri, against Charlotte and Momoka and manages to defeat them. However, Momoka brings out her true power as a third generation Artificial Arm, overpowering Akira and exposing her gender to everyone and encouraging Charlotte to become Mermaid's new leader, after which Mamori and Mirei discover Atelier Torino in shambles.
10	"Oppression"; Transliteration: "Opuresshon" (Japanese: オプレッション)	Odahiro Watanabe	Gō Zappa	December 12, 2015
Kasumi recalls how she and her partner Hibiki Kenjo, who has been in shock ever after being attacked on the island, was protected by Akira and made commander of Warter. With Akira's gender exposed, Charlotte, under Momoka's influence, declares herself the new governor, sending soldiers to capture the residents of Atelier Torino, while Momoka and her allies use a mysterious power to inspect people's bodies for something. As Mirei infiltrates Veste, having Mamori take Akira somewhere safe, she is attacked by Kasumi, who is forced to fight her upon learning that Hibiki is being held hostage by the Adel team. With Mirei having to use her Enhance ability to defend herself, Mamori manages to rescue Hibiki and reunite her with Kasumi. After Mamori joins Mirei to defeat the Adel using the Valkyrie Effect, they are attacked by Momoka.
11	"Soldier Arm"; Transliteration: "Sorujā āmu" (Japanese: ソルジャーアーム)	Fujiaki Asari; Fumihiro Ueno; Masayuki Matsumoto	Yōsuke Kuroda	December 19, 2015
As Momoka, who were once a part of the same experiments as Mirei, prepares to attack, Lady Lady show up to fight against her, but find their attacks ineffective against her Soldier Arm. Momoka and her allies then kidnap Mamori, learning of the potential within her and deciding to keep her to herself. Meanwhile, Mirei recalls when she was in the same organization as Momoka, having been exiled after refusing to kill others and later sent to Mermaid due to possessing the Armed Virus. Blaming Mirei for everything bad that happened for her, Momoka prepares to use Mamori's body for her own gains. Mirei, joined by Lady Lady, head to Veste to rescue Mamori and the other captives, fighting her way past Charlotte before confronting Momoka, who plans to use Mamori's own form against her.
12	"Valkyrie Drive"; Transliteration: "Varukirī doraivu" (Japanese: ヴァルキリー・ドライヴ)	Odahiro Watanabe	Yōsuke Kuroda	December 26, 2015
Mirei struggles to fight against Momoka as she wields Mamori against her, but is aided by Kasumi, who is finally joined in battle by Hibiki, as well as Lady Lady and Meifon . However, Momoka uses Mamori's Valkyrie ability to absorb other girls into her arm and become stronger, overwhelming the others in a single shot and absorbing them. Inside the blade, as the captives are attacked by tentacles that draw the Armed Virus out of them, providing Momoka with enough power to even destroy a satellite, Mirei manages to break free and reunite with Mamori, freeing her from Momoka's control and releasing the others. Combining together into a perfect form, the Valkyrie Drive, Mirei and Mamori battle against Momoka as she combines with allies to transform into a giant robot. With support from all of her friends, Mirei manages to defeat Momoka, removing the Armed Virus from her and everyone else. As the residents of Mermaid are finally given the chance to return home to their families, Mirei and Mamori, along with Meifon and Lady Lady, travel around the world in order to help others carrying the Virus.

=== Anime specials ===
Special short episodes that came with each Blu-ray/DVD volume.

==== Episode list ====
No.	Title	Directed by	Written by	Original release date
1	"Please Don't Tell"; Transliteration: "Himitsu ku-da-sa-i" (Japanese: 秘密・く・だ・さ・い)	Takumi Minamiura	Yōsuke Kuroda	December 18, 2015
Mamori narrates her ideal sexual fantasy to Mirei, which involves her being the dominant one and licking and fingering Mirei to orgasm. Shocked, Mirei asks Mamori if she sees her as a toy.
2	"It Takes Two to Tango"; Transliteration: "Futari janakya dame na no" (Japanese: ふたりじゃなきゃだめなの)	Takumi Minamiura	Gō Zappa	January 27, 2016
While having a bubble bath, Charlotte goes over her sexual fantasies involving treating Miranda like a dog, tying Monroe up with bandages, tickling Ange with a feather, and Marianne rubbing her with oil. Unable to choose, she decides to bring them all to her room.
3	"Can't Sleep Without You"; Transliteration: "Sabishikute nemurenai" (Japanese: 淋しくて眠れない)	Takumi Minamiura	Gō Zappa	February 24, 2016
After a shower, Kasumi lies in bed fantasizing about sex with Hibiki. Afterwards, she cries.
4	"The Actress in the Mirror"; Transliteration: "Kagami no naka no akutoresu" (Japanese: 鏡の中のアクトレス)	Takumi Minamiura	Gō Zappa	March 23, 2016
Akira strips down and laments how she is forced to disguise herself as a man. She also deeply misses the girlfriend she left behind when she was sent to the island. She puts on her disguise and says she must do her duty.
5	"BELIEVE IN ME, BELIEVE IN YOU"	Takumi Minamiura	Gō Zappa	April 27, 2016
Rain and Lady J have sex. Lady J asks Rain if she is so aroused from watching Mamori and Mirei together, but Rain denies it.
6	"Lonely Chaser"; Transliteration: "Ronrī cheisā" (Japanese: ロンリーチェイサー)	Takumi Minamiura	Gō Zappa	May 25, 2016
Momoka reminisces on a time she molested Mirei. She promises to capture Mirei and squeeze the life out of her.

=== Manga ===
The franchise has spawned two manga series. Valkyrie Drive: Siren—Breakout, a web manga illustrated by Ayase, began serialization on Famitsu Comic Clear in November 2015. An adaptation of Valkyrie Drive: Mermaid illustrated by Yuztan began serialization in Kadokawa Shoten's Comp Ace magazine in December 2015.
