= Wondership Q =

2015 video game

- Developers: Cygames, Miracle Positive Co., Ltd.
- Publishers: Cygames, Sony Computer Entertainment
- Designer: Lindwurm
- Platforms: PlayStation Vita; Microsoft Windows
- Release: PlayStation Vita: JP: November 19, 2015; Microsoft Windows: WW: July 18, 2016
- Genres: Action-adventure, Sandbox
- Mode: Single-player

Wondership Q (known as Airship Q in Japan) is a 2D sandbox action-adventure game developed by Cygames for PlayStation Vita and Steam. The Vita version was released in Japan on November 19, 2015, and the English version was released internationally for Steam on July 18, 2016.

== Overview ==
The story follows two siblings turned into cats, who explore a vast 2D world on an airship in pursuit of the witch who transformed them, and to save the island of Laputa.

The game is unique in several ways: it is cited in the official trailer as the first sandbox RPG from Japan, owing influence primarily to Terraria. This shows the western indie scene's burgeoning influence on the Japanese industry, whereas it had previously been the opposite before the west gained dominance in the gaming world. The Vita version is also one of the few retail imports to offer an official English patch, which is available to importers who have access to PlayStation Network. The game automatically displays the text in several languages, based on whatever the system's regional settings, if there is a translation for said region. Therefore, if someone from the US or UK region has downloaded the patch, it should display text in English by default, so long as the system's region is defined as such. Lastly, it is compatible with PSTV, putting it in stark contrast with Terraria, which did not offer this because of its touch-screen controls exclusive to the Vita.

Despite offering a patch to cater to importers, there is no official retail or digital release in the US or Europe for the Vita version as of now. A PlayStation 4 port is also rumored, but yet to be released.

== Reception ==
The game won Tokyo Game Show's 2015 award for Best Platformer, and 4Gamer.net's 2014 award of excellence for an indie title.
