= IA/VT Colorful =

2015 video game

- Developer: Marvelous
- Publisher: Marvelous
- Platform: PlayStation Vita
- Release: JP: July 30, 2015
- Genre: Rhythm game
- Mode: Single-player

IA/VT Colorful is a rhythm game for the PlayStation Vita developed by Marvelous, and is based on Vocaloid's IA Project. It was released in Japan on July 30, 2015.

== Development ==
The lead developer of the game, Kenichiro Takaki, was previously the producer of Senran Kagura. The game features downloadable content support.

== Gameplay ==
In-game screenshot of the main interface.

The rhythm game requires players to press the face buttons and D-pad directions of the PlayStation Vita in time with musical notes. Notes appear from various directions and follow lines of varying shapes until they reach a circular "catcher". Pressing the buttons as the note is in the middle of the catcher will score the most points. Certain notes allow the player to press any button they desire and will fill the player's "Colorful" gauge by an amount depending on the player's timing. Certain parts of each song, represented by a red bar on the timeline, are "Colorful sections" and will use the Colorful gauge the player has earned beforehand to give them a score multiplier for the duration of the Colorful section.

As the player progresses through a music track, the game stage gradually becomes more colorful. The feedback of each music track is dynamic and varies based on the player's own performance. The game revolves around the virtual diva known as IA, who is a Vocaloid developed by the company 1st Place Co., Ltd. The game features 60 different songs, with an additional 19 songs available as downloadable content. Some music tracks feature new music background video footage exclusive to the game, whilst others contain the original video track for the song. The game features different play modes, including challenge modes with varying difficulty levels, consecutive play, and free play.

== Song list ==
A total of 60 playable songs are available in the game, with 5 additional songs as an early purchase bonus and 14 more following the initial game release as additional downloadable content.

No.	Japanese	English	Producer
01	Kisaragi Atenshon (如月アテンション)	Kisaragi Attention	Jin (Shizen no Teki-P) (じん)
02	God only knows	God only knows	Darvish-P
03	TSUBASA New Days	TSUBASA New Days	A-Bee
04	Asu no Hikari (アスノヒカリ)	Light of Tomorrow	Nhato
05	Yūgure no Shinsō (夕暮れの真相)	The Truth of the Evening	Shirakami Mashiro (白神真志朗)
06	Shōnen wa Kyōshitsu ga Kirai datta no da (少年は教室がきらいだったのだ)	The Boy Hated the Classroom	Ishifuro (石風呂)
07	Ni Jū Ni Seiki kara no Harō (22世紀からのハロー)	Hello from the 22nd Century	Rider-P
08	kūsō Foresuto (空想フォレスト)	Imagination Forest	Jin (Shizen no Teki-P) (じん)
09	Ravu Sajitariusu (ラヴ・サジタリウス)	Love Sagittarius	Mutsuki Levin
10	Re;BIRTH	Re;BIRTH	seleP
11	Nokoru Natsu ni Hanataba o (残る夏に花束を)	Flowers for the Remaining Summer	nodoka
12	Yūkei Iesutadei (夕景イエスタデイ)	Sunset Yesterday	Jin (Shizen no Teki-P) (じん)
13	Yumemi Gokochi (夢見心地)	Dreamy State of Mind	nio
14	Raia (ライア)	Liar	Nekobolo
15	Hoshizora no Raion (星空のライオン)	Lion of the Starry Sky	emon (Tes.)
16	Kagerō≒Bariēshon (影炎≒Variation)	Shadow-Haze≒Variation	Yairi
17	Chirudoren Rekōdo (チルドレンレコード)	Children Record	Jin (Shizen no Teki-P) (じん)
18	Kakashi (鹿驚)	Scarecrow	Mochizuki Urara (21)
19	Summer Songs	Summer Songs	Komatsu Kazuya (小松一也)
20	Ōvāsureputo (オーヴァースレプト)	Overslept	Neru
21	Rizu no Naishin Kakumei (リズの内心革命)	Revolution of Liz's Innermost Heart	Zips (じっぷす)
22	Ayano no Kōfuku Riron (アヤノの幸福理論)	Ayano's Theory of Happiness	Jin (Shizen no Teki-P) (じん)
23	Rōrerai (ローレライ)	Lorelei	monaca:factory
24	Bai Bai Sūpāsutā (ばいばいスーパースター)	Bye Bye Superstar	Ishifuro (石風呂)
25	Party Party	Party Party	Komorita Minoru (コミリタミノル)
26	Migawari Kibonnu (身代わりキボンヌ)	Scapegoat Wish	Gameni
27	Over Drive	Over Drive	TeddyLoid
28	Falling Apart	Falling Apart	Taishi
29	Nihonbashi Kōkashita Āru Keikaku (日本橋高架下R計画)	Japan Bridge Overpass Under R Plan	Jin (Shizen no Teki-P) (じん)
30	Pējento ~Foa ei Gurōrī~ (ページェント ～for a GLORY～)	Pageant ~for a GLORY~	mito (from clammbon) (ミト (from クラムボン))
31	Bokura ni Kigeki o Misetekure (僕らに喜劇を見せてくれ)	Show the Comedy to Us	Jin (Shizen no Teki-P) (じん)
32	killer smile	killer smile	yksb
33	Kuraudo Raidā (クラウドライダー)	Cloud Rider	Hayato Tanaka (田中隼人) × Jane Su
34	Ginga Tetsudō Sanbyaku Roku Jū Go (銀河鉄道365)	Galaxy Express 365	dezzy (Ichiokuen-P (一億円P))
35	Enmei Chiryō (延命治療)	Life-sustaining Treatment	Neru
36	Kimi no Koto ga Suki de Gomennasai (キミのことが好きでゴメンナサイ)	I'm Sorry for Liking You	UtataP (うたたP)
37	Tanshoku Sekai (単色世界)	Monochromatic World	Wataame (KisetsuP) (綿飴 (季節P))
38	Crystal Prism	Crystal Prism	ANANT-GARDE EYES
39	ITYNITED IDENTITY	ITYNITED IDENTITY	Nanahoshi Kangengakudan (ナナホシ管弦楽団)
40	Inner Arts	Inner Arts	Jin (Shizen no Teki-P) (じん)
41	RACER'S HIGH	RACER'S HIGH	Nanahoshi Kangengakudan (ナナホシ管弦楽団)
42	Heisei Katakurizumu (ヘイセイカタクリズム)	Serenity Cataclysm	Zips (じっぷす)
43	Heddofon Akutā (ヘッドフォンアクター)	Headphone Actor	Jin (Shizen no Teki-P) (じん)
44	Adagaeshi Shindorōmu (仇返しシンドローム)	Retaliation Syndrome	Mafumafu (まふまふ)
45	Wārudo Kōringu (ワールド・コーリング)	World Calling	Jin (Shizen no Teki-P) (じん)
46	Chiri Chiri Juso (塵塵呪詛(チリチリジュソ))	Dust Dust Curse	Kikuo (きくお)
47	Ronrī Chairudo (ロンリーチャイルド)	Lonely Child	otetsu
48	Circuit DISCO	Circuit DISCO	Komatsu Kazuya (小松一也)
49	Tōkyō Riaru Wārudo (東京リアルワールド)	Tokyo Real World	out of service
50	Rosu Taimu Memorī (ロスタイムメモリー)	Lost Time Memory	Jin (Shizen no Teki-P) (じん)
51	Yūgure Semi Nikki (夕暮れ蝉日記)	Evening Cicada Diary	Mafumafu (まふまふ)
52	Itsuwari no Ketsui (偽りの決意)	False Determination	Shirakami Mashiro (白神真志朗)
53	Shōjo Jishōheki (少女自傷癖)	A Young Girl's Self-Harm Habit	PolyphonicBranch
54	Genjitsu Teki Ronri Shugisha (現実的論理主義者)	A Realistic Logical Ideologist	Goboumen (ゴボウメン)
55	Setsuna Doraibu (セツナドライブ)	Momentary Drive	Taki Yoshimitsu (滝善充) (9mm Parabellum Bullet)
56	Kyō ga Ame no Hi Janai Toshite (今日が雨の日じゃないとして)	As Is Not a Day of Rain Today	Ishifuro (石風呂)
57	Samātaimu Rekōdo (サマータイムレコード)	Summertime Record	Jin (Shizen no Teki-P) (じん)
58	Koi Tsubaki Hime (恋椿姫)	Camellia Princess' Love	PolyphonicBranch
59	Zekkyō Paranoia (絶境パラノイア)	Remote Paranoia	TOTAL OBJECTION
60	Yokohama Batoru Rain (横浜バトルライン)	Yokohama Battle Line	out of service
DLC01	Uragiri Mojūru (ウラギリモジュール)	Betrayer Module	UtataP (うたたP)
DLC02	Sandē Minami Pāku (サンデーミナミパーク)	Sunday Minami Park	Ishifuro (石風呂)
DLC03	Dōkoku Kyūketsuki (慟哭吸血鬼)	Wailing Vampire	Yasuhiro
DLC04	Shinigami no Gitā (死神のギター)	Death God's Guitar	PotentialO
DLC05	Puromunādo (プロムナード)	Promenade	monaca:factory
DLC06	Hajimari no Niwa (はじまりの庭)	The Garden of Beginning	Shirakami Mashiro (白神真志朗)
DLC07	Yobanashi Diseibu (夜咄ディセイブ)	Night Tales Deceive	Jin (Shizen no Teki-P) (じん)
DLC08	Shooting Star	Shooting Star	TeddyLoid
DLC09	Majikku Awā (マジックアワー)	Magic Hour	out of service
DLC10	Yakubyō Gami (ヤクビョウガミ)	Deity of Diseases	Mafumafu (まふまふ)
DLC11	Ōvākurokku (オーヴァークロック)	Overclock	Neru
DLC12	Dōkei (憧憬～DOUKEI～)	Longing	Back-On
DLC13	Kimi no Tonari ni (君のとなりに)	Next to You	Rerulili
DLC14	Nakimushi Piero (泣き虫ピエロ)	Crybaby Pierrot	PolyphonicBranch
DLC15	Geragera to Warau na (ゲラゲラと笑うな)	Don't Laugh Out Loud	Ishifuro (石風呂)
DLC16	Sanatoriumu (サナトリウム)	Sanatorium	Shinakura
DLC17	Perverse Love Rock!	Perverse Love Rock!	Nakazawa Tomoyuki (I've)
DLC18	Afutāgurō (アフターグロウ)	Afterglow	Zaunyang
DLC19	I Want You	I Want You	Mighty Mighty Ft VOCALOID IA/Masakey

- Songs with a yellow background are in the base game files, but only unlocked from the early-purchase bonus set (先着購入特典セット, Senchaku kōnyū tokuten setto) which is only available from codes included with early copies of the game.
- Songs with an orange background are DLC and must be purchased on the PlayStation Network to be played.

== Reception ==
Famitsu gave the game a review score of 34/40. The game sold 38,881 physical retail copies within its first week of release, taking third place within Japan's weekly software sales rankings.

Kotaku compared IA/VT Colorful to the Hatsune Miku: Project DIVA game series, as well as praising the soundtrack of the game, writing "IA/VT is a solid first step for a Miku-rivalling music game series. It succeeds in the most important areas with its great game play interface and an astounding soundtrack. On the other hand, it is missing many of the extras [...] from the Project Diva games and the song unlock process makes playing a chore at times. Still, if you are a Project Diva fan, you owe it to yourself to give IA/VT a try.
