= CyberAgent =

Japanese entertainment conglomerate

CyberAgent Inc.
- Logo since 2015

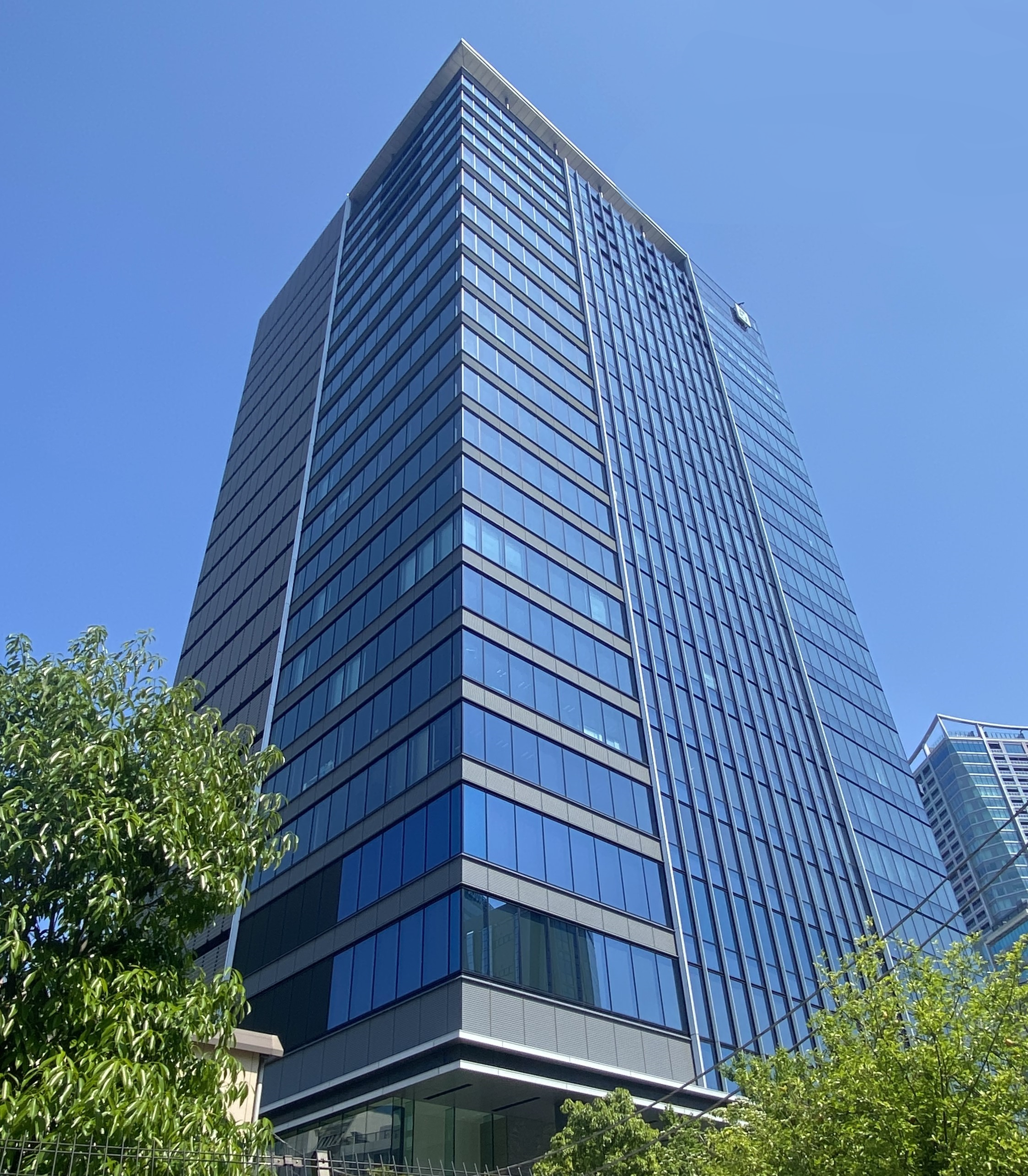
- Headquarters at Abema Towers in Shibuya, Tokyo, in 2023
- Trade name: CyberAgent
- Native name: 株式会社サイバーエージェント
- Romanized name: Kabushiki-gaisha Saibāējento
- Type: Public
- Traded as: TYO: 4751
- ISIN: JP3311400000
- Industry: Entertainment
- Founded: March 18, 1998; 28 years ago
- Founder: Susumu Fujita
- Headquarters: Abema Towers, Udagawachō, Shibuya, Tokyo, Japan
- Area served: Worldwide
- Key people: Susumu Fujita (chairman); Takahiro Yamauchi (president and CEO)
- Products: Television production; Digital media; Publishing; Merchandise; Streaming media; Live event promotion; Video games
- Services: Licensing
- Revenue: ▲¥802.9 billion (US$5.14 billion) (2024)
- Operating income: ▲¥41.8 billion (2024)
- Net income: ▲¥20.6 billion (2024)
- Total assets: ▲¥520.4 billion (2024)
- Owner: Susumu Fujita (20.50%)
- Number of employees: 7,720 (2024)
- Subsidiaries: Abema (55.2%); Ameba; Cygames (61.7%); Cypic; CyberFight; Colorful Palette; CA Soa; Craft Egg; CyberZ; FC Machida Zelvia; CCPR; Sirok; GCrest; Griphone; Nitroplus (72.5%); QualiArts; Sumzap; WinTicket; TV Asahi (8%); New Japan Pro-Wrestling (46.3%)
- Website: www.cyberagent.co.jp

CyberAgent Inc. (株式会社サイバーエージェント, Kabushiki-gaisha Saibāējento) is a Japanese entertainment conglomerate, which was founded in 1998 by Susumu Fujita and headquartered in Shibuya, Tokyo. It is owned by Susumu Fujita with 20.50% interest; Fujita is the representative director, while Yusuke Hidaka is the executive vice president.

CyberAgent is listed on the Tokyo Stock Exchange and is a constituent of the Nikkei 225 since 2000.

== History ==
Susumu Fujita, who was an employee of the staffing company Intelligence (later Persol Career), founded the company in March 1998 with Yusuke Hidaka, supported by Yasuhide Uno, the founder of Persol Career. In July 1998, due to strong sales of Value Click, the company launched the click-guaranteed banner ad service "CyberClick" in collaboration with On The Edge, entering the internet advertising business. In 2000, the company was list on the Tokyo Stock Exchange, establishing a South Korean subsidiary, and focused on advertising business.

Ameba was established in September 2004. By 2008, the number of users had grown substantially, reaching 13.28 million in May. Nielsen//NetRatings attributed this in part to the number of popular celebrity blogs on the platform. Server upgrades were performed in 2007 and 2008 to account for the increase in traffic.

In April 2006, formed a strategic alliance with NTV Football Club Co., Ltd., which operates Tokyo Verdy 1969, which had a uniform sponsorship contract with the previous year, acquiring 48.1% of the club's issued shares, becoming the largest shareholder after Nippon Television Network as the largest shareholder until its withdrawal in January 2008.

Cygames was established May 9, 2011, a Japanese web services company. In 2012, DeNA purchased a 24% stake in Cygames. Shortly thereafter, the studio was chosen by Game Developer (formerly Gamasutra) as one of the top ten game developers of the year. In June 2012, Cygames founded CyDesignation, a company specialized in Design, Illustration, Game planning and Game development.

In 2016, it established a live streaming service called Fresh Live. On April 1, 2016 it was transferred to CyberAgent subsidiary AbemaTV and its name was changed to AbemaTV Fresh!, and on June 26, 2018 its name was changed to Fresh Live. Termination of the service began on February 12, 2019, when the creation of new channels, in addition to archiving and other functions, was disabled for most channels. Complete closure of the service on November 30, 2020, was announced on October 9, 2020. Since 2019, CyberAgent integrated the service with Openrec.tv, another live streaming service operated by CyberAgent subsidiary CyberZ, and some channels migrated to that service.

CyberAgent and TV Asahi launched Abema TV service on April 11, 2016, having soft-launched some channels on March 1 of the same year. AbemaTV channels stream in real-time, similar to traditional linear TV, but missed programs can only be watched through its paid subscription tiers, which was officially launched as the on-demand Abema Video feature in April 2017. The platform's linear model was deliberately chosen to differentiate it from standard video-on-demand services; Fujita noted that "finding content is a hassle" and aimed to provide an effortless viewing experience akin to traditional television as one of U-Next's competitors in a following decade.

On September 1, 2017, 100% of DDT's shares were sold to the CyberAgent company. Sanshiro Takagi remained as the DDT president. On January 28, 2020, it was announced that CyberAgent had purchased Pro Wrestling Noah from Lidet Entertainment. On July 27, 2020, it was announced that Noah, DDT Pro-Wrestling would merge in a new company that would eventually be called CyberFight. It was also revealed that the Noah and DDT brands would not be retired and would maintain their unique and current brand names, logos, etc. and would act as two separate brands within CyberFight, as well as the Tokyo Joshi Pro-Wrestling (TJPW) and Ganbare☆Pro-Wrestling (GanPro) brands, originally created and operated by DDT.

In June 2024, CyberAgent announced that it had acquired 72.5% of Nitroplus for 16.7 billion yen, making it a subsidiary.

In January 2025, CyberAgent established CA Soa, an animation production studio subsidiary. The studio was established to develop Japanese animated works with international appeal, focusing on both adaptations of existing properties and original productions.

In November 2025, CyberAgent signed a strategic alliance and cooperation with Konami and Electronic Arts focused on video game business, as well as the signing of the JOC/JPC, NPB, and J-League became official partners.

In April and May 2026, CygamesPictures was renamed to Cypic after its consolidation as a subsidiary under CyberAgent through direct share acquisition in February 2026. In May 2026, Bushiroad announced that it would sell its NJPW shares to its rivals CyberAgent and previous minority shareholder TV Asahi. As a result of this sale NJPW would become a subsidiary of TV Asahi. Of Bushiroad's 10,500,400 shares (70%), 3,550,200 shares are being transferred to TV Asahi and 6,950,200 shares are being transferred to CyberAgent, and the sale is supposed to be concluded on June 30, 2026.

On November 11, 2026, MAPPA and CyberAgent have announced that the two companies have established a strategic business alliance. In addition, CyberAgent announced that it has acquired a stake in MAPPA's parent company, MHD.

== Controversies and criticism ==
In April 2015 a former employee of CyberAgent accused the company of unauthorized stealing of articles and images, inappropriate quoting, and undercover marketing were often pointed out with BuzzFeed Japan also accused the company of the same thing but the allegations were later denied.

In the fall of 2016, DeNA's healthcare information website "WELQ" had a problem due to inappropriate content and inappropriate citations, and from December 1 to 2, 2016, thousands of articles related to medical and health related to "Spotlight" and a few percent of approximately 35,000 articles related to by.S were deleted. CyberAgent explained that the privately held articles were written by registered users and with the company claiming could not be fully verified with addiction expanded the scope of private disclosure, and deleted all articles posted by registered users on both websites. A total of less than 100,000 articles were deleted.

== See also ==
- D.League
