= Kenichiro Takaki =

Japanese video game producer (born 1976)

- 高木 謙一郎
- Born: November 5, 1976 (age 49)
- Occupation: Video game producer
- Notable work: Senran Kagura

Kenichiro Takaki (高木 謙一郎) is a Japanese video game producer known for his work on the Senran Kagura franchise.

== Career ==
Kenichiro Takaki worked at Marvelous for 17 years, becoming head of subsidiary Honey Parade Games in 2017.

In early 2019, Takaki discussed how recent restrictions on "sexualized" content had made releasing series such as Senran Kagura outside Japan difficult. In 2019, Takaki announced that he was leaving Marvelous to join Cygames, citing increased restrictions on sexual depictions in games as part of his reason for leaving, and stated that at Cygames he would be working on a fantasy game, a genre he had been interested in as a child. Takaki described his relationship, position, and compensation with Marvelous as excellent, saying that he felt driven to take on a new challenge and that having to distance himself from previous work was painful.

Takaki joined Cygames as general manager of the company's new console division formed on April 1, 2019. His initial work included being producer of Project Awakening and an advisory role on Granblue Fantasy Versus and Granblue Fantasy: Relink.

== Works ==
At Marvelous

Work	Role	Year
Red Ninja: End of Honor	Game design Director	2005
Negima!? Chou Mahora Taisen Chuu: Checkiin Zenin Shuugou! Yappari Onsen Kichaimashitaa		2007
Mahō Sensei Negima!? Neo-Pactio Fight!!		2007
Ikki Tousen: Shining Dragon		2007
Valhalla Knights 2		2008
To Love-ru -Trouble- Waku Waku! Rinkangakkō-hen	Producer	2008
To Love-ru -Trouble- Doki Doki! Rinkaigakkō-hen	Producer	2008
Ikki Tousen: Eloquent Fist		2008
Half-Minute Hero	Producer, director	2008
Valhalla Knights 2: Battle Stance		2009
Sakura Note: Ima ni Tsunagaru Mirai		2009
Livly Garden		2010
Ikki Tousen: XROSS IMPACT		2010
Half-Minute Hero: The Second Coming	Producer, director	2011
Zoo Mania 3D	Producer	2011
Senran Kagura: Shōjo-tachi no Shin'ei and Senran Kagura Burst	Series Creator, Planning, Concept, Producer, Lyrics	2011
Senran Kagura Burst	Series Creator, Planning, Concept, Producer, Lyrics	2012
Senran Kagura Shinovi Versus	Series Creator, Planning, Original Work, Producer, Lyrics	2013
Senran Kagura 2: Deep Crimson	Series Creator, Planning, Original Work, Producer, Lyrics	2014
Senran Kagura: Bon Appétit!	Series Creator, Planning, Original Work, Producer, Lyrics	2014
IA/VT Colorful		2015
Senran Kagura: Estival Versus	Series Creator, Game Designer, Producer, Lyrics	2015
Valkyrie Drive: Bikkhuni		2015
Valkyrie Drive: Siren		2015
UPPERS		2016
Senran Kagura: Peach Beach Splash	Series Creator, Game Designer, Producer, Lyrics	2017
Senran Kagura: Reflexions	Series Creator, Game Designer, Producer, Lyrics	2017
Shinobi Master Senran Kagura: New Link	Series Creator, Game Designer, Producer, Lyrics	
Senran Kagura Burst Re:Newal	Series Creator, Game Designer, Producer, Lyrics	2018
Senran Kagura: Peach Ball	Series Creator, Game Designer, Producer, Lyrics	2018
Kandagawa Jet Girls		2020

At Cygames

Work	Role	Year
Granblue Fantasy Versus	Console Game Department	2020
Little Noah: Scion of Paradise	Producer	2022
Project Awakening	Producer	TBA
Garnet Arena: Mages of Magicary	Director, Producer	TBA
