= Center Gai =

Street in Shibuya, Tokyo, Japan

Coordinates: 35°39′35.33″N 139°42′0.57″E

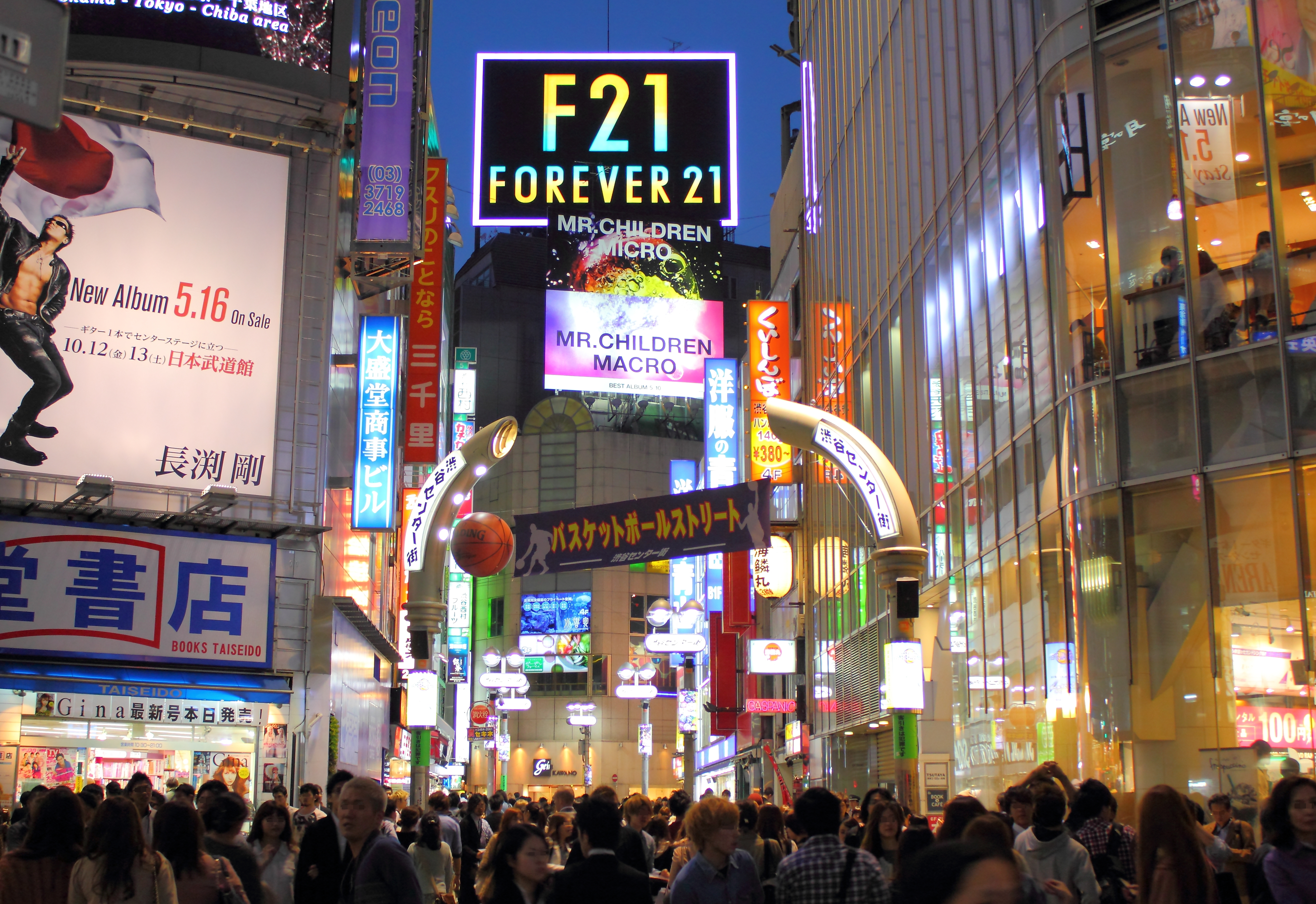

- Center Gai (Special wards of Tokyo)
- Native name: センター街 (Japanese)
- Type: Pedestrian
- Location: Udagawachō, Shibuya, Tokyo
- Nearest metro station: Shibuya Station
- East end: Shibuya Crossing
- West end: Yumeji Street

Center Gai (センター街 Sentā-gai) is a narrow street in Udagawachō (宇田川町), Shibuya, Tokyo, Japan. It is a popular area for youths as it has a variety of popular brand name stores, fast food outlets and nightclubs. Its name is meant to signify how it is the "center" of Shibuya. It can be reached from Shibuya Station.

Center Gai originated as a road built over culverts spanning the Udagawa River.

On June 20, 1997, as a result of strong winds from typhoon No.7 Opal (08W, Kuring) that had descended on the Kantō region, a 4-ton archway at the entrance to Center Gai collapsed, killing one man outright, and injuring several others.
