= Little Noah: Scion of Paradise =

2022 video game

- Developers: Cygames; Grounding
- Publisher: Cygames
- Directors: Hiroki Matsuura; Kengo Shibata
- Producers: Yukio Futatsugi; Kenichiro Takaki
- Artists: Toshiyuki Yonekura; Yoshitaka Kinoshita; Akihiko Yoshida
- Writer: Ryuji Sato
- Composer: Hitoshi Sakimoto
- Platforms: Nintendo Switch; PlayStation 4; Windows; Xbox One; Xbox Series X/S
- Release: Switch, PS4, Windows; June 28, 2022; Xbox One, Series X/S; November 1, 2023
- Genres: Action role-playing, platform
- Mode: Single-player

Little Noah: Scion of Paradise (Note: Japanese: リトル ノア 楽園の後継者, Hepburn: Ritoru Noa Rakuen no Koukeisha) is a 2022 action role-playing game with roguelike elements developed by Cygames and Grounding. It is based on the discontinued mobile game Battle Champs.

The game was released for Nintendo Switch, PlayStation 4, and Windows on 28 June 2022. Versions for Xbox One and Xbox Series X/S released in 2023.

== Development ==
Scion of Paradise repurposes assets from Cygames' mobile game Battle Champs, known in Japan as Little Noah (Note: リトル ノア, ritoru noa), which was released in 2015 and shut down in 2019. This includes character designs by Akihiko Yoshida and the soundtrack composed by Hitoshi Sakimoto.

The console game was inspired by Dead Cells and Valkyrie Profile. It was primarily developed by Grounding Inc., as most of the internal staff at Cygames was busy with titles such as Granblue Fantasy: Relink. Grounding was chosen due to Yukio Futatsugi's experience in developing action games, and the teams quickly found common ground in regards to game feel and mechanics. It was worked on by around 30 developers in collaboration with 3 key people from Cygames, with other staff also assisting from time to time.

== Release ==
Little Noah: Scion of Paradise was released for Nintendo Switch, PlayStation 4, and Windows via Steam on June 28, 2022. Versions for Xbox One, Xbox Series X/S, and Windows via Microsoft Store were released on November 2, 2023. The game was not put in early access, and has competitive price point. This decision was made to reach more players, as it was Cygames' first simultaneous worldwide launch. Paid DLC costumes based on Uma Musume Pretty Derby and Princess Connect! Re:Dive were added after launch, and it received multiple major updates with additional modes and characters.

== Reception ==
Little Noah: Scion of Paradise for Nintendo Switch received "generally favorable" reviews and a score of 87/100, according to review aggregator website Metacritic.

The simple game loop was considered of the game's strongest points. Touch Arcade found the game to be more approachable than many of its roguelike peers, and praised its "charming character designs and solid gameplay mechanics". Siliconera liked how clear the game conveys information to the player, and how its random elements keep the gameplay fresh. Nintendo World Report appreciated that Little Noah can be finished in around 10 hours without overstaying its welcome or overwhelming the player with different currencies, but wished for a more interesting story and some extra modes. Lastly, Nintendo Life concluded that the game is one they can easily recommend, with "excellent combat" and "satisfying progression", but felt that it's not ambitious enough to feel truly special.
