= Ameba (website) =

Japanese blogging and social networking website

- Company type: Public subsidiary
- Website type: Social networking service
- Available in: Japanese (Blogging Platform, Virtual Community, Social Games)
- Headquarters: Tokyo, Japan
- Area served: Japan
- Parent: CyberAgent
- Website: www.ameba.jp
- Current status: Active (Mobile browser Pigg), Active (Pigg Party mobile app), Active (Pigg Life mobile app), Closed (Pigg PC Version), Closed (Pico)

Ameba (Japanese: アメーバ, Hepburn: Amēba) is a Japanese blogging and social networking website.

In December 2009, Ameba launched Ameba Now, a micro-blogging platform competing with Twitter. In March 2010, Ameba also launched Ameba Pico, an international counterpart of Ameba Pigg available to play through Facebook.

== History ==
Ameba blogs, known as Ameblo (Japanese: アメブロ, romanized: ameburo), were first created in September 2004. By 2008, the number of users had grown substantially, reaching 13.28 million in May. Nielsen//NetRatings attributed this in part to the number of popular celebrity blogs on the platform. Server upgrades were performed in 2007 and 2008 to account for the increase in traffic.

In 2009, CyberAgent launched the micro-blogging platform Ameba Now as a competitor to Twitter.

In February 2009, they also launched Ameba Pigg, a Japanese-language avatar-based virtual world wherein registered users could chat, decorate and visit rooms, join events, and more. In July 2009, the game reported to have 500,000 active players in only its first five months. In 2011, CyberAgent announced that Ameba Pigg had surpassed six million registered users and was generating approximately 600 million yen in monthly revenue from its in-game paid currency, known as "Ameba Gold."

The following year in March 2010, an international version of Ameba Pigg called Ameba Pico was released and made available to play on Facebook, as well as through its official website (pico.ameba.net). The game was available to play in English, French, Chinese, Thai, and Spanish. Ameba Pico retained most of the features found in Ameba Pigg, but with certain differences in content, features, and available areas such as the inclusion of language-based chatroom areas. In just two and a half months since its launch, the game reported to have exceeded one million users. On December 17, 2012, the game officially shut down.

Between April and August 2013, 243,266 Ameba accounts were compromised. The company requested users change their passwords.

In early 2019, Ameba announced that the PC version of Ameba Pigg would be shut down by December 2, 2019, due to the termination of Adobe Flash in 2020, leaving only the smartphone version available but with limited features.

Ameba blogs were scheduled to be split off to CyberAgent subsidiary CyberOwl; the transfer was cancelled in March 2025 due to an internal investigation into CyberOwl's accounting practices.

== See also ==
- AbemaTV
