= Udagawachō =

District in Shibuya, Tokyo, Japan

Udagawachō 宇田川町
- Neighborhood in Shibuya
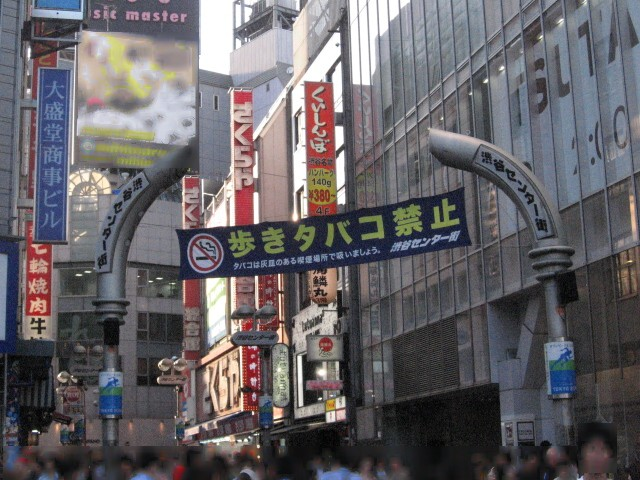
- Center Gai
- Interactive map of Udagawachō
- Country: Japan
- Prefecture: Tokyo
- Special ward: Shibuya

Population (1 October 2020)
  - Total: 797
- Time zone: UTC+09:00
- ZIP code: 150-0042
- Telephone area code: 03

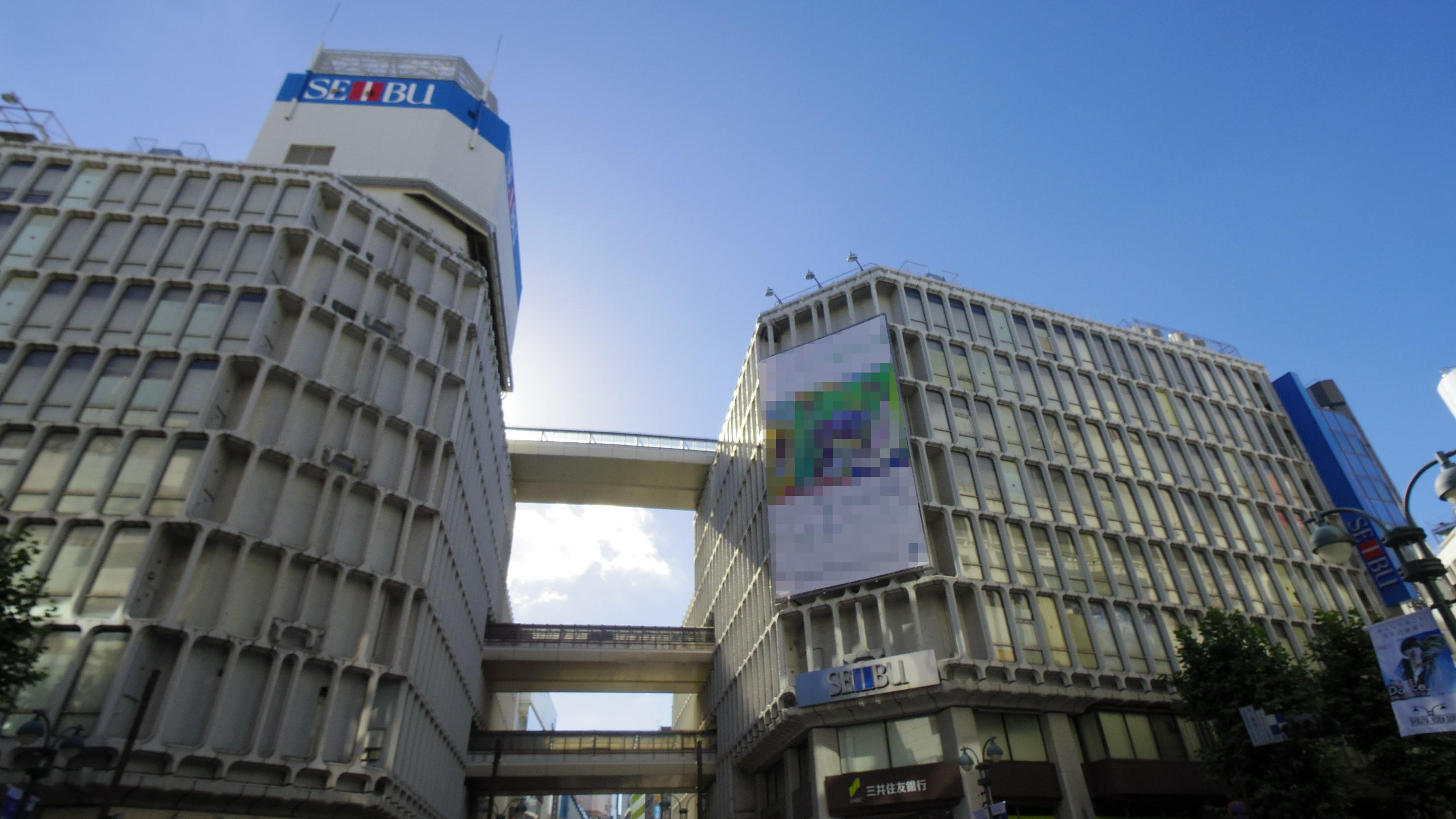
Seibu Shibuya

Udagawachō (宇田川町) is a district of Shibuya, Tokyo, Japan.

As of October 2020, the population of this district is 797. The postal code for Udagawachō is 150–0042.

== Demography ==
Population of Udagawachō by Chōme (October 1, 2020)
District	Number of Households	Total Population	Male	Female
Udagawachō	555	810	437	373
Total	555	810	437	373

Population Trend of Udagawachō
Year	Total Population
2012	715
2013	771
2014	803
2015	798
2016	756
2017	769
2018	798
2019	832
2020 (October 1)	810

Population Trends of Udagawachō by Citizenship and Sex
Year	Total Population	Female Population	Male Population	Japanese Population	Non-Japanese Population
2015	798	372	426	732	66
2016	756	353	403	703	53
2017	769	358	411	710	59
2018	798	358	440	724	74
2019	832	376	456	749	83
2020 (October 1)	810	373	437	728	82

== Education ==
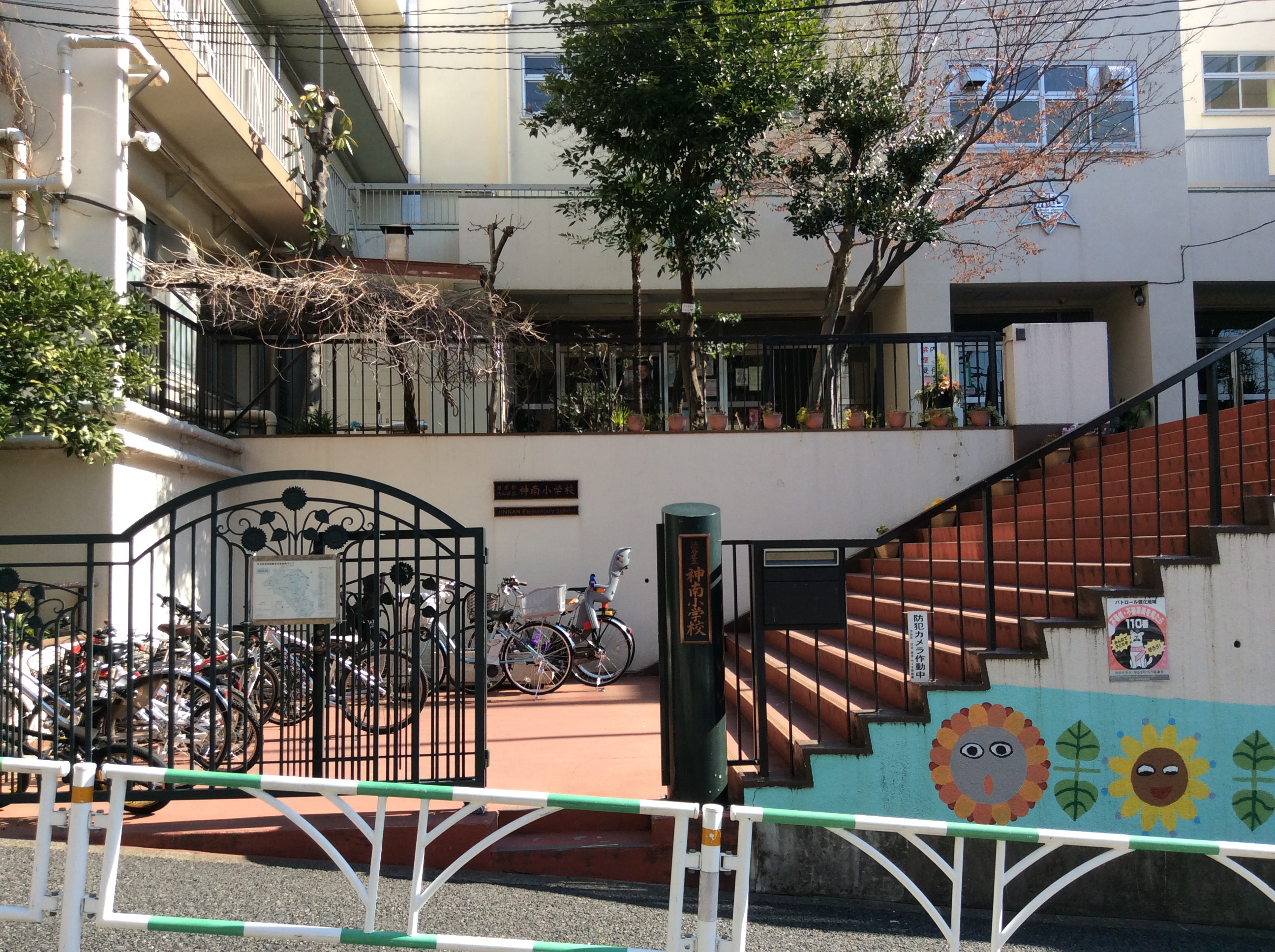
Jinnan Elementary School (神南小学校)

Shibuya Board of Education operates public elementary and junior high schools.

All of Udagawachō is zoned to Jinnan Elementary School (神南小学校), and Shoto Junior High School (松濤中学校).

== Notable residents ==
The poet and painter Yumeji Takehisa resided in Udagawachō from 1921 to 1923.

== See also ==
- Center Gai
