= AT-X (TV network) =

Japanese anime pay television channel

- Country: Japan
- Headquarters: Roppongi, Minato, Tokyo

Programming
- Languages: Japanese; English
- Picture format: HDTV 1080i

Ownership
- Owner: AT-X, Inc.
- Key people: Keisuke Iwata (president)

History
- Launched: 24 December 1997; 28 years ago

Links
- Website: www.at-x.com

AT-X, an abbreviation of Anime Theatre X, (Note: Japanese: アニメシアターX, Hepburn: Anime Shiatā Ekkusu), is a Japanese anime television network owned by AT-X, Inc. (Note: 株式会社エー・ティー・エックス, Kabushiki kaisha Ē-Tī-Ekkusu). AT-X, Inc. was founded on June 26, 2000, as a subsidiary of TV Tokyo Medianet and owned by TV Tokyo. Its headquarters are in Minato, Tokyo. The AT-X network has been broadcasting anime via satellite, cable, and IPTV since December 24, 1997.

AT-X has broadcast many Comic Gum anime adaptations. Ikki Tousen, Ah My Buddha and Juden Chan were first shown on this channel, before they were re-broadcast on Tokyo MX. Due to its status as a premium channel, AT-X is also known for showing uncensored versions of several anime such as Juden Chan, Ah My Buddha, Girls Bravo, Elfen Lied, Mahoromatic, High School DxD and Redo of Healer, which would normally be censored on free-to-air television due to the large amount of mature content.

== Timeline ==
- December 24, 1997 – AT-X begins broadcasting on DirecTV Channel 270.
- November 30, 1998 – Bandai Chara Net TV, a third-party channel through which AT-X aired, closes due to SkyPort, its satellite provider (a subsidiary of Mitsubishi owned Space Communications Corporation, also jointly held by Sony Corporation), shutting down. AT-X moves to the SuperBird C satellite.
- 1999 – Starts airing "Diamond Time", its first self-produced show.
- June 26, 2000 – AT-X Inc. is founded.
- September 30, 2000 – DirecTV ceases Japanese operations, focusing on its core American market instead (its former parent, Hughes Electronics (a General Motors subsidiary), launched their own subscription satellite service of the same name in the United States in 1994).
- October 1, 2000 – AT-X is picked up by Sky PerfecTV! on Channel 729.
- May, 2001 – Figure 17, the first AT-X funded anime, begins airing.
- July 1, 2002 – Sky! PerfecTV 2 begins broadcasting AT-X on Channel 333.
- January 26, 2004 – Launch of "AT-X Shop", their online store.
- July 12, 2005 – Mobile edition of the shop launches.
- April 1, 2009 – Subscription price raises to 1890 yen. 24-hour broadcast schedule starts.
- June, 2009 – TV Tokyo's Keisuke Iwata is appointed president of the company.
- October 1, 2009 – SKY PerfectTV! HD begins broadcasting AT-X HD on Channel 667.
- November 1, 2009 – Hikari TV begins broadcasting AT-X HD on Channel 380.
- January 27, 2010 – Sky PerfecTV! e2 switches from 4:3 to 16:9 aspect ratio while retaining Standard Definition.
- October 1, 2011 – J:COM begins broadcasting AT-X HD on Channel 605.
- October 1, 2012 – The AT-X broadcast configuration is dramatically reorganized.
- December, 2012 – AT-X joins the Association of Copyright for Computer Software (ACCS), in an effort to keep their videos off the Internet.
- February 28, 2013 – Ceased all SD broadcasts, for a full transition to HD broadcasting.
- April 18, 2013 – AT-X airs its first foreign cartoon/non-anime series in Japanese language; My Little Pony: Friendship Is Magic
- November 29, 2013 – Closure of the "AT-X Shop" online store.
- December 24, 2017 – AT-X celebrates 20th anniversary with the new anime programming lineup for 2018.

== TV programs ==
Year aired	Title
2009	07-Ghost
2009	11eyes
2011	30-sai no Hoken Taiiku
2011	Abnormal Physiology Seminar
2012	Accel World
2013	Ace of Diamond
2012	Aesthetica of a Rogue Hero
2005	Ah My Buddha
2013	Ai Mai Mi
2007	AIKa R-16: Virgin Mission
2009	AIKa ZERO
2008	Akane Iro ni Somaru Saka
2001	Alien Nine
2006	Amaenaideyo!! Katsu!!
2008	Amatsuki
2013	Amnesia
2012	Aoi Sekai no Chūshin de
2010	Arakawa Under the Bridge
2010	Arakawa Under the Bridge x Bridge
2005	Aria the Animation
2006	Aria the Natural
2007	Aria the OVA: Arietta
2008	Aria the Origination
2011	Astarotte no Omocha!
2009	Asura Cryin'
2009	Asura Cryin' 2
2007	Ayakashi
2002	Azumanga Daioh
2010	B Gata H Kei
2010	Baka to Test to Shokanju
2011	Baka to Test to Shokanju: Ni!
2006	Bakegyamon
2009	Bakemonogatari
2013	Bakumatsu Gijinden Roman
2007	Bamboo Blade
2002	Barom One
2011	Sengoku Otome: Momoiro Paradox
2011	Ben-To
2006	Binbō Shimai Monogatari
2008	Blade of the Immortal
2008	Blassreiter
2010	Blessing of the Campanella
2018	Bloom Into You
2006	Bludgeoning Angel Dokuro-Chan
2007	Bludgeoning Angel Dokuro-Chan 2
2007	Blue Drop
2007	Bokurano
2011	A Bridge to the Starry Skies
2012	Btooom!
2004	Burn-Up Scramble
2008	Bus Gamer
2012	Campione!
2009	Canaan
2005	Capeta
2011	Cardfight!! Vanguard
2012	Cardfight!! Vanguard: Asia Circuit
2013	Cardfight!! Vanguard: Link Joker
2011	Cat God
2010	Cat Planet Cuties
2008	A Certain Magical Index
2010	A Certain Magical Index II
2009	A Certain Scientific Railgun
2013	A Certain Scientific Railgun S
2015	Chaos Dragon
2012	Chitose Get You!!
2010	Chu-Bra!!
2003	Cinderella Boy
2007	Code-E
2005	Comic Party Revolution
2008	Corpse Princess
2009	Corpse Princess: Black
2011	Croisée in a Foreign Labyrinth
2011	Cross Fight B-Daman
2012	Cross Fight B-Daman eS
2009	Cross Game
2013	Cuticle Detective Inaba
2011	C³
2013	Da Capo III
2012	Daily Lives of High School Boys
2011	Danball Senki
2012	Danball Senki W
2010	Dance in the Vampire Bund
2007	Dead Girls
2010	Demon King Daimao
2002	Demon Lord Dante
2006	Demonbane
2004	Diamond Daydreams
2003	Divergence Eve
2007	Dōjin Work
2011	Dororon Enma-kun Meeramera
2007	Dragonaut: The Resonance
2007	Ef: A Tale of Memories
2008	Ef: A Tale of Melodies
1999	Ehrgeiz
2007	El Cazador de la Bruja
2004	Elfen Lied
2007	Engage Planet Kiss Dum
2012	The Familiar of Zero F
2009	Fight Ippatsu! Jūden-chan!!
2001	Figure 17
2002	Firestorm
2006	Flag
2010	Fortune Arterial: Akai Yakusoku
2011	Freezing
2008	Ga-Rei: Zero
2009	GA: Geijutsuka Art Design Class
2006	Gakuen Heaven
2006	Galaxy Angel Rune
2004	Gantz: Second Stage
2012	gdgd Fairies
2013	gdgd Fairies 2
2002	Genma Wars
2006	Gift: Eternal Rainbow
2011	Gintama'
2009	The Girl Who Leapt Through Space
2006	Girl's High
2006	Glass Mask
2003	Godannar
2009	Gokujō!! Mecha Mote Iinchō
2013	Golden Time
2011	Gosick
2002	Gun Frontier
2004	Gunbuster 2: Diebuster
2003	Gungrave
2007	Gurren Lagann
2006	.hack//Roots
2010	Hakuōki
2010	Hakuōki Hekketsuroku
2011	Hakuōki Sekkaroku
2012	Hakuōki Reimeiroku
2008	Hakushaku to Yōsei
2010	Hanamaru Kindergarten
2001	Hanaukyo Maid Team
2004	Hanaukyo Maid Team: La Verite
2010	Harukanaru Toki no Naka de 3: Owari Naki Unmei
2008	Hatenkō Yūgi
2007	Hayate the Combat Butler
2009	Hayate the Combat Butler!!
2011	Heaven's Memo Pad
2007	Hero Tales
2007	Heroic Age
2012	High School DxD
2013	High School DxD New
2015	High School DxD BorN
2018	High School DxD Hero
2010	Highschool of the Dead
2011	Highschool of the Dead: Drifters of the Dead
2006	Higurashi no Naku Koro ni
2007	Higurashi no Naku Koro ni Kai
2006	Himawari!
2010	Hime Chen! Otogi Chikku Idol Lilpri
2007	Hitohira
2007	Ichigo Mashimaro OVA
2005	Idaten Jump
2007	Idolmaster: Xenoglossia
2003	Ikki Tousen
2007	Ikki Tousen: Dragon Destiny
2008	Ikki Tousen: Great Guardians
2010	Ikki Tousen: Xtreme Xecutor
2011	Inazuma Eleven GO
2011	Is This a Zombie?
2012	Is This a Zombie? of the Dead
2012	Jormungand
2012	Jormungand: Perfect Order
2012	K
2009	Kaasan - Mom's Life
2003	Kaleido Star
2005	Kaleido Star: Legend of Phoenix ~Layla Hamilton Story~
2008	Kamen no Maid Guy
2007	Kamichama Karin
2005	Kamichu!
2011	Kamisama Dolls
2011	Kami-sama no Memo-chō
2009	Kanamemo
2008	Kanokon: The Girl Who Cried Fox
2009	Kanokon: Manatsu no Daishanikusai
2006	Kashimashi: Girl Meets Girl
2006	Katekyō Hitman Reborn!
2008	Kemeko Deluxe!
2010	Ketsu-Inu
2006	Kiba
2008	Kiddy Grade
2013	Kiniro Mosaic
2018	Kiniro Mosaic: Pretty Days
2006	Kirarin Revolution
2007	Kishin Taisen Gigantic Formula
2010	Kissxsis
2008	Koihime Musō
2009	Shin Koihime Musō
2010	Shin Koihime Musō: Otome Tairan
2012	Kokoro Connect
2007	Kono Aozora ni Yakusoku o - Yōkoso Tsugumi Ryōhe
2013	Kotoura-san
2007	Kōtetsu Sangokushi
2010	Ladies versus Butlers!
2011	Last Exile: Fam, the Silver Wing
1998	Legend of the Galactic Heroes Side Stories 2
2010	The Legend of the Legendary Heroes
2006	Lemon Angel Project
2011	Level E
2012	Listen to Me, Girls. I Am Your Father!
2008	Live On Cardliver Kakeru
2012	Love, Elections & Chocolate
2013	Love Lab
2006	Lovedol ~Lovely Idol~
2005	Magical Girl Lyrical Nanoha A's
2008	Magician's Academy
2006	Magikano
2012	Maji de Otaku na English! Ribbon-chan: Eigo de Tatakau Mahō Shōjo
2011	Maji de Watashi ni Koi Shinasai!
2011	Maken-Ki! Battling Venus
2013	Mangirl!
2011	Manyū Hiken-chō
2006	Marginal Prince
2009	Maria Holic
2011	Maria Holic: Alive
2009	Maria Watches Over Us: 4th Season
2011	Mashiroiro Symphony: The Color of Lovers
2018	Merc Storia: Mukiryoku no Shōnen to Bin no Naka no Shōjo
2007	Minami-ke
2008	Minami-ke: Okawari
2009	Minami-ke: Okaeri
2013	Minami-ke: Tadaima
2009	Miracle Train - Ōedo-sen e Yōkoso
2004	Misaki Chronicles
2008	Mission-E
2010	Mitsudomoe
2011	Mitsudomoe Zōryōchū!
2010	MM!
2009	Modern Magic Made Simple
2007	Moetan
2007	Mokke
2008	Monochrome Factor
2015	Monster Musume
2010	Motto To Love Ru
2012	Muv-Luv Alternative: Total Eclipse
2007	My Bride Is a Mermaid
2013	My Little Pony: Friendship Is Magic (Japanese Dubbed)
2007	Myself ; Yourself
2012	Mysterious Girlfriend X
2011	The Mystic Archives of Dantalian
2008	Nabari no Ou
2007	Nagasarete Airantou
2009	Natsu no Arashi!
2009	Natsu no Arashi! Akinai-chū
2009	Natsume Yūjin-chō
2009	Zoku Natsume Yūjin-chō
2012	Natsume Yūjin-chō San
2012	Natsume Yūjin-chō Shi
2002	Naruto
2007	Naruto: Shippuden
2009	Needless
2008	Neo Angelique Abyss
2009	Neo Angelique Abyss -Second Age-
2008	Net Ghost PiPoPa
2010	Night Raid 1931
2008	Nogizaka Haruka no Himitsu
2009	Nogizaka Haruka no Himitsu: Purezza
2013	Non Non Biyori
2012	Nyarko-san: Another Crawling Chaos
2010	Occult Academy
2012	Oda Nobuna no Yabō
2010	Ōkami-san & Her Seven Companions
2014	One Week Friends
2012	Oniai
2011	Oniichan no Koto Nanka Zenzen Suki Janain Dakara ne—!!
2013	Oreshura
2015	Overlord
2007	Over Drive
2010	Panty & Stocking with Garterbelt
2011	Penguindrum
2009	Phantom ~Requiem for the Phantom~
2012	Polar Bear's Café
2007	Polyphonica
2009	Polyphonica Crimson S
2007	Potemayo
2012	The Prince of Tennis II
2009	Princess Lover!
2008	Prism Ark
2015	Prison School
2013	Problem Children are Coming from Another World, Aren't They?
2006	Project Blue Earth SOS
2008	Psychic Squad
2007	Pururun! Shizuku-chan Aha!
2009	Queen's Blade: The Exiled Virgin
2009	Queen's Blade 2: The Evil Eye
2011	Queen's Blade: Utsukushiki Tōshi-tachi OVA
2012	Queen's Blade Rebellion
2011	R-15
2004	Ragnarok the Animation
2006	Rakugo Tennyo Oyui
2021	Redo of Healer
2009	Rideback
2008	RIN ~Daughters of Mnemosyne~
2011	Rio: Rainbow Gate!
2011	Ro-Kyu-Bu!
2008	S · A: Special A
2009	The Sacred Blacksmith
2007	Saint Beast: Kouin Jojishi Tenshi Tan
2007	Saint October
2009	Saki
2012	Saki: Episode of Side A
2010	Samurai Girls
2008	Sands of Destruction
2009	Sasameki Koto
2007	School Days
2006	School Rumble: 2nd Semester
2010	SD Gundam Sangokuden Brave Battle Warriors
2010	Seikon no Qwaser
2011	Seikon no Qwaser II
2010	Seitokai Yakuindomo
2011	Sekai-ichi Hatsukoi
2011	Sekai-ichi Hatsukoi 2
2008	Sekirei
2010	Sekirei ~Pure Engagement~
2013	Senran Kagura
2013	Senyū.
2002	Seven of Seven
2011	Shakugan no Shana Final
2007	Shattered Angels
2008	Koihime Musō
2009	Shin Koihime Musō
2010	Shin Koihime Musō: Otome Tairan
2010	Sayonara, Zetsubou-Sensei
2015	Shimoneta: A Boring World Where the Concept of Dirty Jokes Doesn't Exist
2009	Shin Mazinger Shougeki! Z Hen
2007	Shining Tears X Wind
2002	Shinseikiden Mars
2002	Shrine of the Morning Mist
2007	Shugo Chara!
2010	Shugo Chara!! Doki—
2010	Shugo Chara! Party!
2006	Simoun
2007	Sisters of Wellber
2008	Sisters of Wellber Zwei
2011	Sket Dance
2007	Sketchbook ~full color'S~
2008	Skip Beat!
2007	Sky Girls
2009	Slap-up Party: Arad Senki
2008	Slayers Revolution
2009	Slayers Evolution-R
2012	So, I Can't Play H!
2011	Softenni
2007	Sola
2009	Sora no Manimani
2009	Sora o Miageru Shōjo no Hitomi ni Utsuru Sekai
2008	Soul Eater
2006	Soul Link
2010	Sound of the Sky
2005	Speed Grapher
2008	Spice and Wolf
2009	Spice and Wolf II
2011	Squid Girl Season 2
2011	Steins;Gate
2006	Strain: Strategic Armored Infantry
2007	Strait Jacket
2013	Strike the Blood
2003	Submarine Super 99
2006	Sumomomo Momomo - Chijō Saikyō no Yome
2010	Super Robot Wars Original Generation: The Inspector
2007	Suteki Tantei Labyrinth
2012	Sword Art Online
2011	Tamayura
2012	Tamayura: Hitotose
2009	Tayutama: Kiss on my Deity
2017	Tenshi no 3P!
2008	To Love-Ru
2009	To Love-Ru OVA
2012	To Love-Ru Darkness
2015	To Love-Ru Darkness 2nd
2004	To Heart - Remember my Memories
2005	To Heart 2
2006	Tokimeki Memorial ~Only Love~
2008	Toradora!
2007	Touka Gettan
2008	The Tower of Druaga: The Aegis of Uruk
2009	The Tower of Druaga: The Sword of Uruk
2004	Tsuki wa Higashi ni Hi wa Nishi ni: Operation Sanctuary
2006	Tsuyokiss - Cool×Sweet
2009	Umi Monogatari: Anata ga Ite Kureta Koto
2009	Umineko: When They Cry
2013	Unbreakable Machine-Doll
2011	Uta no Prince-sama - Maji Love 1000%
2006	Utawarerumono
2009	Vampire Knight
2009	Vampire Knight Guilty
1997	Virus Buster Serge
2010	Wagnaria!!
2011	Wagnaria!! Season 2
2012	Waiting in the Summer
2011	We, Without Wings
2009	White Album
2002	Wild 7 Another
2004	Wind: A Breath of Heart
2012	Wooser's Hand-to-Mouth Life
2012	Yama no Susume
2011	Yondemasuyo, Azazel-san
2010	Yosuga no Sora
2008	Yotsunoha
2013	Yukikaze
2011	YuruYuri
2012	YuruYuri
2010	Zakuro
2010	Zoku: Sayonara, Zetsubou-Sensei
2010	Zan: Sayonara, Zetsubou-Sensei
2006	Zegapain
2005	Zettai Seigi Love Pheromone
2007	Zombie-Loan
2001	Zone of the Enders

== See also ==
- Television in Japan
- Nickelodeon
- Cartoon Network
- Disney Channel
- Kids Station
- TV Tokyo
