= Anna Mima =

American singer (born 1987)

Anna Mima 美馬 サントス アンナー
- Born: Anna Santos; July 9, 1987 (age 39); Kanagawa, Japan
- Occupation: Singer
- Instrument: Vocals
- Spouse: Manabu Mima

Anna Santos Mima (美馬 アンナー; born July 9, 1987), better known by her mononym Anna, is a singer of the group Bon-Bon Blanco. She has five brothers and is the youngest sibling in the family. She uses Anna in her solo efforts, but she uses her real name when part of the band. She was born in Kanagawa, Japan, but she has American citizenship.

Her husband is Japanese baseball player Manabu Mima.
