= Mako (voice actress) =

- まこ
- Born: Mako Sakurai; October 7, 1986 (age 39); Tokyo, Japan
- Occupations: Voice actress; singer
- Years active: 2005–present
- Employer: I'm Enterprise
- Musical career
- Genres: J-pop
- Instruments: Vocals; maracas
- Years active: 2002–2006

Mako Sakurai (桜井 真子, Sakurai Mako; born October 7, 1986), better known by the mononym name Mako (sometimes stylised MAKO), is a Japanese voice actress, singer and a member of the band Bon-Bon Blanco, in which her prominent role is as the maraca player. She has also performed in a Japanese television drama called Meido in Akihabara. She is affiliated with I'm Enterprise. Her anime voice acting debut was in Kamichu! where, in the ending theme song, her character also plays the maracas. As Hinako Hiiragi in anime Chitose Get You!! she plays maracas again, in the ending theme (episodes 1–13).

== Filmography ==
=== Anime ===
2005

- Kamichu! as Yurie Hitotsubashi

2006

- School Rumble: 2nd Semester as Karen Ichijō

2008

- Kannagi: Crazy Shrine Maidens as Clerk (ep 10), Lolikko Cutie
- Kyo no Gononi as Kazumi Aihara

2009

- Sweet Blue Flowers as Child (ep 4), Primary School Student B (ep 1), The Flower (eps 5–6)
- The Girl Who Leapt Through Space as Akiha Shishidō

2010

- K-ON! as Classmate
- Jewelpet Twinkle as Angelina, Charotte
- Hanamaru Kindergarten as Koume
- Fairy Tail as Natsu Dragneel (young)

2011

- A-Channel as Hira-chan
- Oniichan no Koto Nanka Zenzen Suki Janain Dakara ne—!! as Shizuru
- C³ as Mummy Maker
- Jewelpet Sunshine as Charotte
- Nekogami Yaoyorozu as Yoshino

2012

- Kono Naka ni Hitori, Imōto ga Iru! as Shiga
- Saki Episode of Side A as Yū Matsumi
- Jewelpet Kira Deco—! as Charotte, Maco
- Chitose Get You!! as Hinako Hiiragi
- Natsuiro Kiseki as Yuusuke
- Natsuyuki Rendezvous as Fool

2013

- Arpeggio of Blue Steel as Maya
- Jewelpet Happiness as Charotte

2014

- Saki: The Nationals as Yû Matsumi
- Phi Brain: Kami no Puzzle as Girl

2015

- My Love Story!! as Misaki

2016

- Tsukiuta. The Animation as Ai Kisaragi

2018

- Senran Kagura Shinovi Master -Tokyo Yōma-hen- as Ryōna

2019

- Star Twinkle PreCure as Libra's Star Princess

=== OVA ===
- Koe de Oshigoto! as Kanna Aoyagi
- Kyō no Go no Ni as Kazumi Aihara
- School Rumble: Third Semester as Karen Ichijō
- Senran Kagura: Estival Versus – Festival Eve Full of Swimsuits as Ryōna

=== Video games ===
2011

- Corpse Party: Book of Shadows as Sayaka Ooue

2014

- Ar Nosurge as Nelico
- Senran Kagura: Shinovi Versus as Ryōna

2015

- Senran Kagura: Estival Versus as Ryōna
- Yoru no nai kuni as Anas

2017

- Senran Kagura: Peach Beach Splash as Ryōna
