= Cosplay restaurant =

Theme restaurants and pubs in Japan

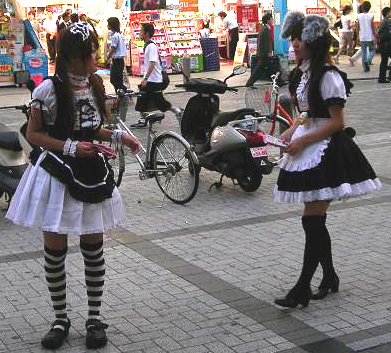
Maids promoting cafes in Akihabara, Tokyo

Cosplay restaurants (コスプレ系飲食店, Kosupure-kei inshokuten) are theme restaurants and pubs that originated in Akihabara, Tokyo, Japan, around the late 1990s and early 2000s. They include maid cafés (メイドカフェ, Meido kafe) and butler cafés (執事喫茶, shitsuji kissa), where the service staff dress as elegant maids or butlers.

The staff treat the customers as masters and mistresses in a private home rather than merely as café customers as part of a role-playing performance central to the experience. Such restaurants and cafés have quickly become a staple of Japanese otaku culture.

The popularity of cosplay restaurants and maid cafes has spread to other regions in Japan, such as Osaka's Den Den Town as well as to places outside Japan, such as Hong Kong, Taiwan, Singapore, Mexico, Canada, and the Philippines.

== History ==
The idea of a cosplay restaurant was born in Akihabara, Tokyo, during the otaku boom of late ’90s-early 2000s Japan. Themed cafés started to make an appearance in the district as it became the haunt of manga, anime and video game fans. Cure Maid Café was the first permanent example, opening in 2001, and it helped to formalize the “maid café” style that became a vital part of Akihabara’s identity.

As of the mid-2000s, maid cafés came become one of the key images of Cool Japan, an official initiative to promote Japanese pop culture overseas. These venues represented Japan’s engagement with “moe,” character performance, social fiction and performance.

After Akihabara’s success, similar cafés spread to other Japanese cities, and other locations in the Greater East Asia, notably in East and Southeast Asia. The origins and history of cosplay developed simultaneously with the global development of anime conventions and fan cultures. Many cafés outside Japan, however, mixed local pop influences with the general looks and service style of the original Akihabara model.

== Characteristics ==
=== Maid café ===
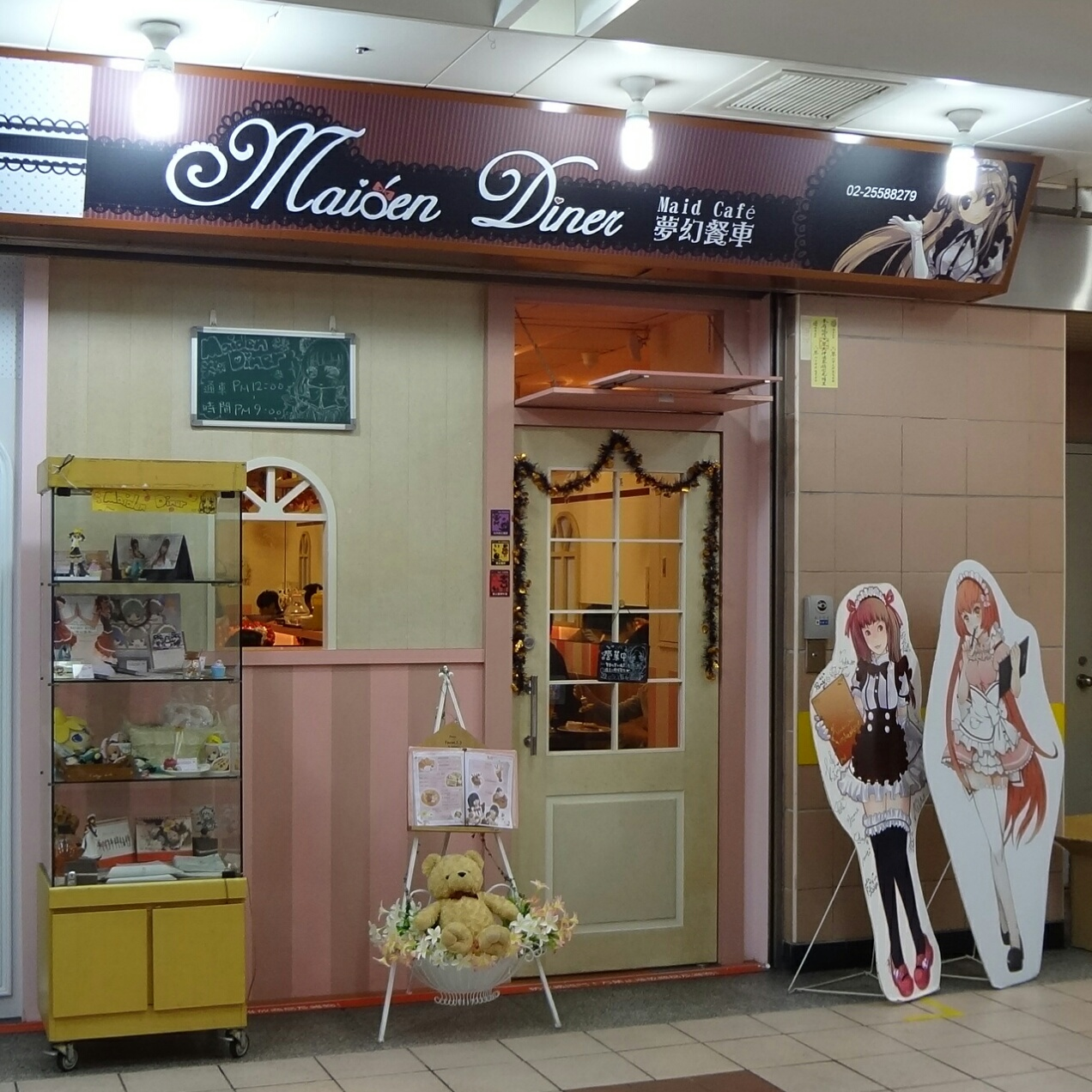
Maid café

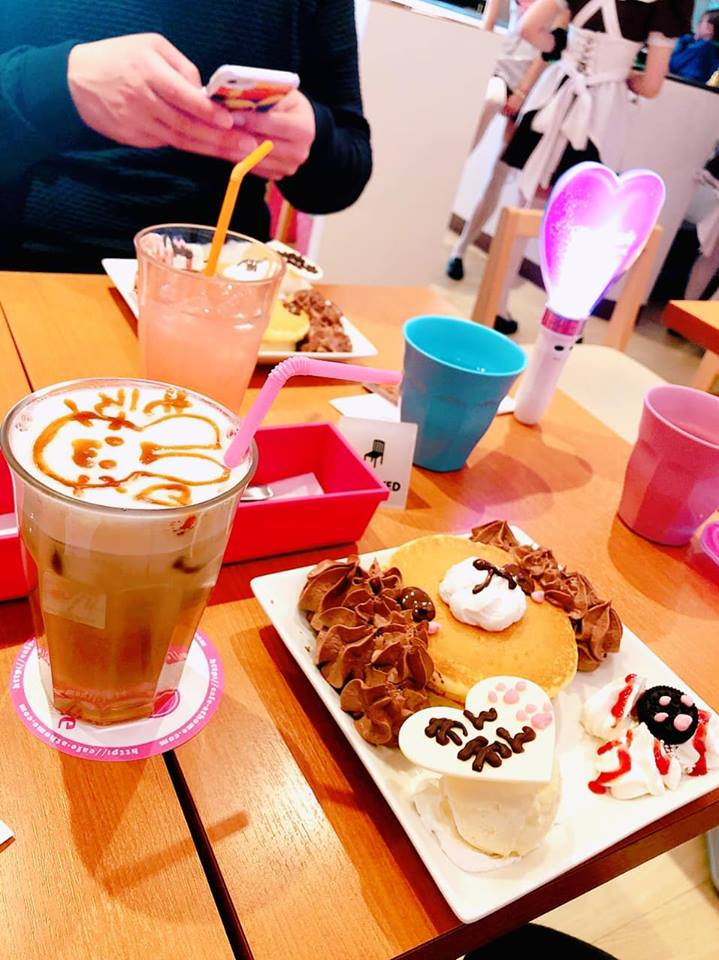
Appearance of food at maid cafes

In a standard maid café the female employees dress up as French maids (occasionally, the maids may wear rabbit or cat ears for extra cute appeal) and refer to the customers as either Master (ご主人様, goshujinsama) or Mistress (お嬢様, ojōsama). Upon entering one of such stores, the customer is greeted with the customary "Welcome home, Master" (お帰りなさいませ、ご主人様！, Okaerinasaimase, goshujinsama), offered a wipe towel and presented with a menu.

Popular dishes include cakes (sometimes baked by the maids themselves), ice-cream, omurice, spaghetti, as well as drinks such as Coca-Cola, tea, milk or alcoholic beverages such as beer or, in some cases, even champagne. Other options (of service) include taking polaroid pictures (either of the maid alone, together with another maid or with the customer, which are then decorated using colored markers or stickers), playing card, video games, and/or even slightly more unusual ones, lighthearted roleplay interactions.

=== Butler café ===
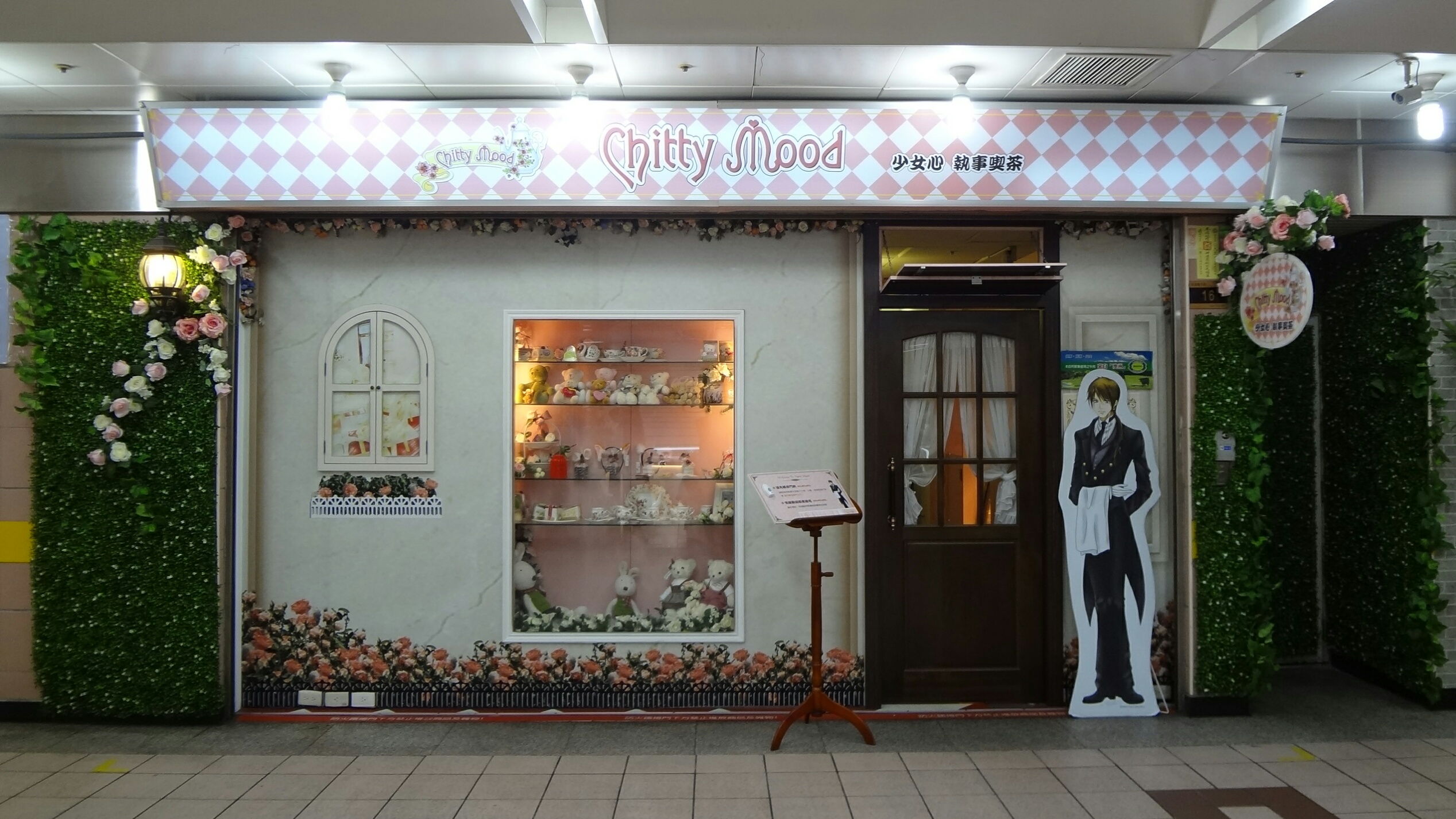
Butler café

While most cosplay restaurants and maid cafes cater mostly to men, there is also a type for women called the butler café (執事喫茶, shitsuji kissa). The butlers in these cafes are well-dressed male employees and may wear either a typical waiter's uniform or even a tuxedo or tails. One butler cafe has its waiters cosplay as teenage schoolboys, in an effort to appeal to the fujoshi who enjoy Boys' Love. There are also cross-dressing ("male disguise style" (男装系, dansō-kei)) butler cafes, where female staff dress up as butlers, instead of actual men.

== Other variants ==
In other stores, the outfits and even the setting itself change. In school-themed cafes, for example, customers are referred to as senpai instead of Master or Mistress. Inside, regular tables are replaced by school desks and even the menu is served in trays reminiscent of the ones used in Japanese schools. Here are some other interesting themes.

Catgirl

=== Cat-maid café ===
Another sub-genre of maid cafe is the cat-maid cafe. Waitresses in these cafes will wear cat ears and tails and often make puns by meowing or punctuate sentences with a meow. Additionally, food will often be prepared to resemble cats or kittens.

=== Tsundere café ===
These cafes have all the characteristics of a typical maid cafe with the addition of a personality theme. The theme has every maid assume a "tsundere" personality archetype wherein the servers in these cafes will often act rude or indifferent to customers. Additionally, some cafes like this allow for the patron to order special service which usually comes in some form of abuse like getting flicked in the forehead.

=== Idol cafés ===
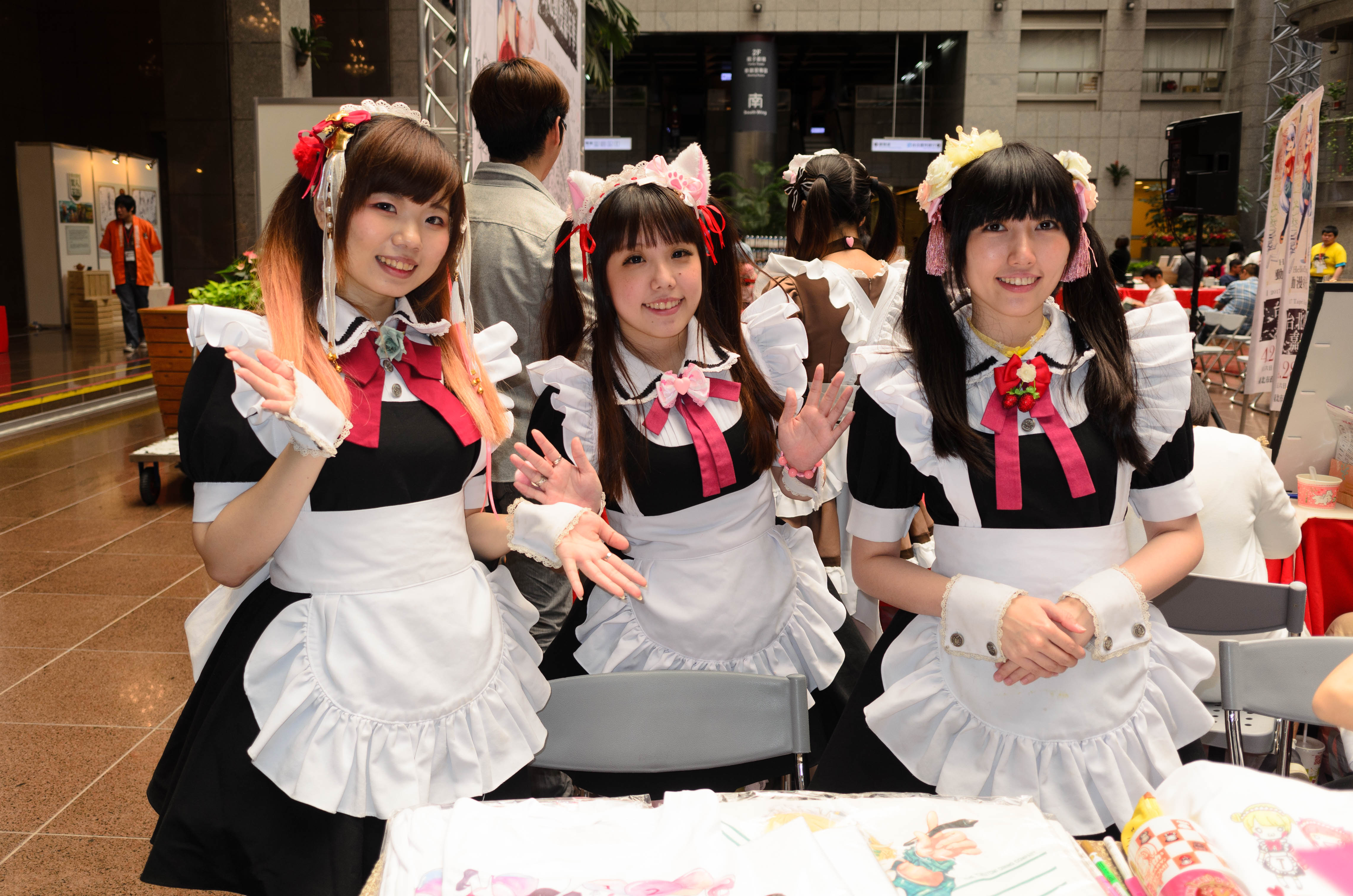

In recent years, some maid cafes have incorporated “idol performances,” where staff members sing and dance on stage like idol group members. They sometimes release CDs or host fan support events.

=== Moe cafés 萌え系カフェ ===
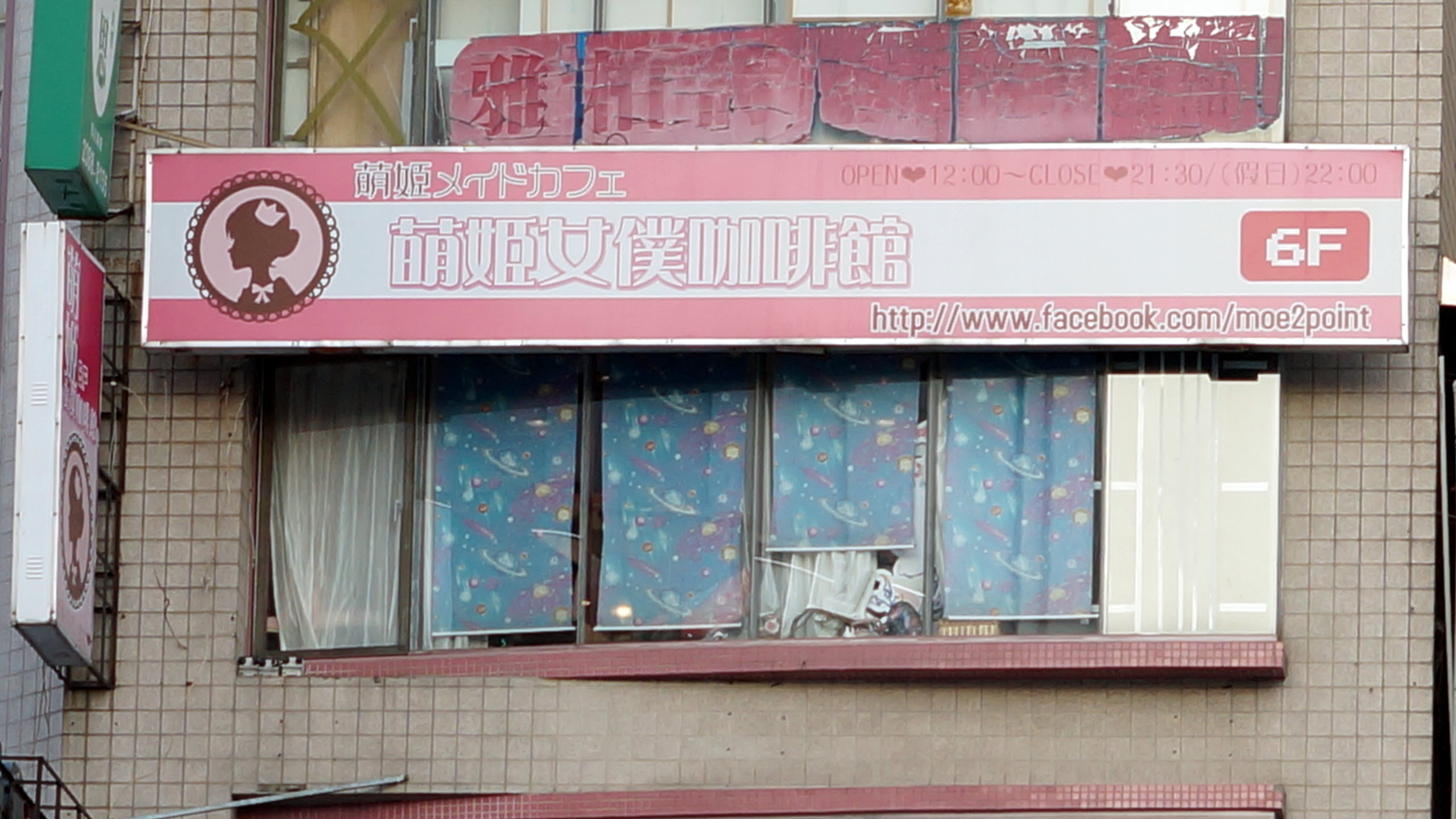
Moe cafés

Although “maid cafés” themselves belong to moe culture, some establishments refer to themselves as “moe-style cafés,” placing greater emphasis on the overall “moe culture” experience (extending beyond maid uniforms to include anime character cosplay or fantasy uniforms).

== Cultural significance and social impact ==
The cosplay restaurant has become a usual part of urban life in Japan, especially in Akihabara, when fans anime with the likes of manga and games. Staff members become midwives. Maids gently greet customers with lines like, “Welcome home Master” while butlers address guests with the politeness of English Manor.

Regulars state that it is not just for their themed food or fancy dress that they head for these performances but also the warmth and recolonisation. The setting is warm, inviting, and an engaging air makes it a bubble away from reality. The style of service was referred to as a form of emotional labor that connects people through play and imagination (Galbraith, Patrick W). Some tourists see maid cafés as places to escape from the everyday.

Others think the humour makes them light-hearted. According to anthropologists Kinko Ito and Paul Crutcher, cosplay cafés have been included in Japan’s “Cool Japan” project that promotes pop culture as an avenue to attract tourists and influence Japan’s image abroad. Through the years, they have evolved as a business and a cultural icon; showing how performance and hospitality in conjunction with a fan culture can manifest in daily life.

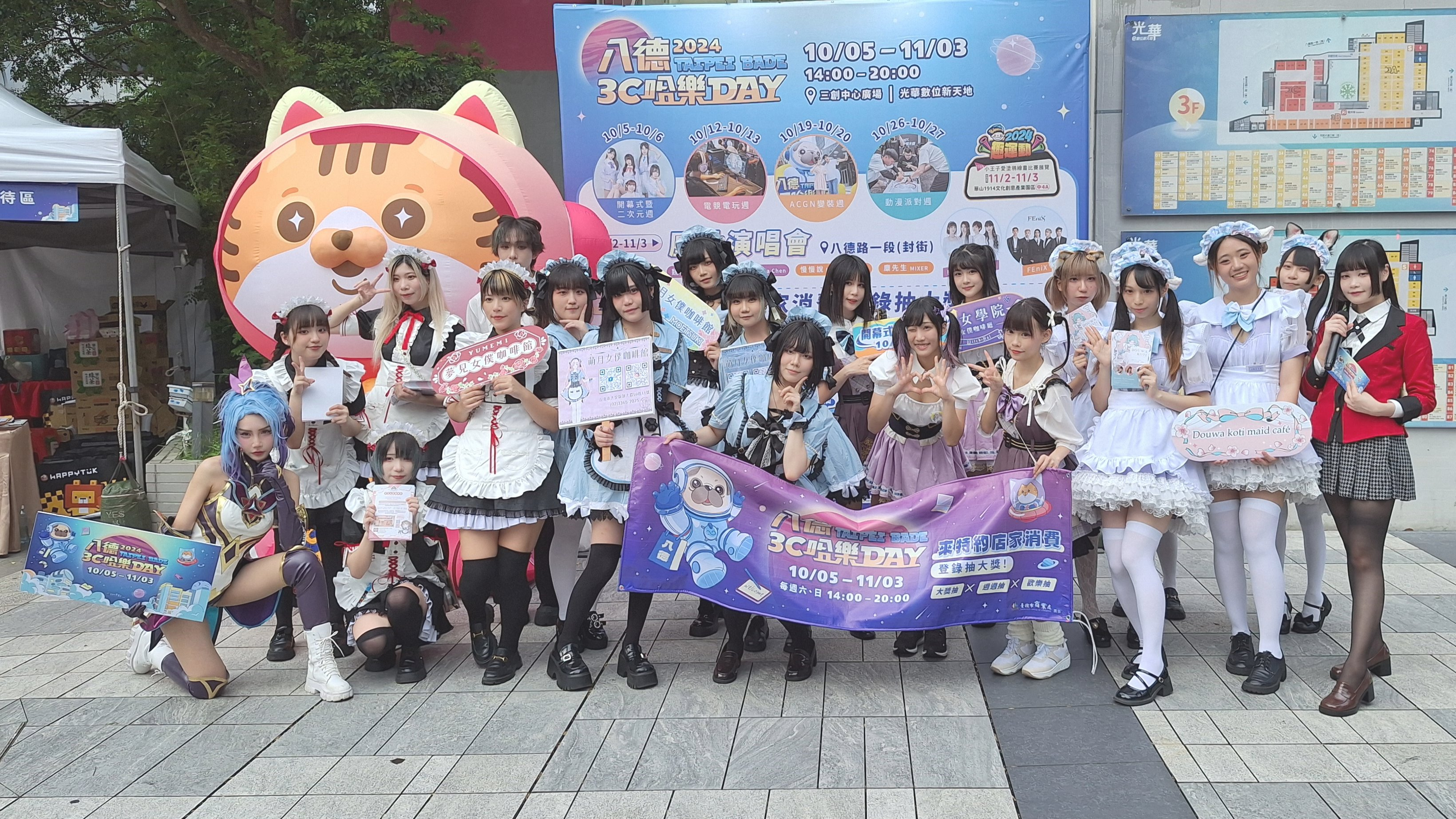
Group photo of the maids

== International expansion ==
=== North America ===
One maid cafe which opened in the west was the "i maid cafe" located in Scarborough, Ontario, and was featured in CBC's newsmagazine, The Hour. The cafe was closed in November 2007 because management failed to pay back rent.

In December 2007, Royal-T opened in Culver City, California, and was featured in several magazines, such as Elle and the Los Angeles Times. It was a combination of maid cafe, store, and art gallery. The restaurant closed after five years.

In September 2008, a Japanese franchise Crepe House Uni opened in Davis, California, but closed in 2010. Their workers wore maid uniforms, but it was not exactly a maid cafe.

In 2012 a maid cafe called "Chou Anime" opened up in the Midtown district of Detroit, Michigan. Information about the cafe could be seen on their website. Chou Anime was officially closed on Saturday, September 22, 2012, due to not seeing a steady flow of customers.

On August 18, 2013, "Maid Cafe NY" opened in New York City, New York. While also serving food, the store also offered various cosplay items for sale and live music entertainment. It closed in March 2015 due to no longer being able to stay in its Chinatown location and being unable to find a new one.

=== Asia ===
The popularity of maid cafés has also spread outside Japan, especially in countries in East and Southeast Asia, which often mix Akihabara motifs with other pop culture trends.

==== Hong Kong ====
The first maid cafés in Hong Kong appeared in the mid-2000s, particularly in Mong Kok and Causeway Bay, as the city developed an interest in Japanese otaku culture.

==== Taiwan ====
Since the late 2000s, Taiwan’s maid cafés have grown in Taipei. Some cafes, such as the Kokorolia 心物語 Maid Café, is very popular and well-known.

==== Philippines ====
During the early 2010s, permanent maid cafés started to appear in the Philippines, particularly in Manila and Quezon City. Maid Café Manila and Maidcafe PH are two cafés that gained popularity through social media and cosplay events. The adaptation of maid culture to the local fandom was successful.

---

Throughout Asia, the cafes tend towards kawaii and interactive service, but are often localized through regional languages, foods, and pop culture references. Their success shows that Japan’s otaku culture is spreading around the world. Also, the maid café concept can adapt to different cultures.

== Maid cafés's worker concerns ==
Many maid cafés in Chinese cities have opened in recent years that take inspiration from Japanese culture. Some associated businesses have been reprimanded over management issues. A probe into “maid café” shops took place in a city in eastern China, as per media reports. Some employees experienced poor working conditions and workplace harassment. Certain power critics maid cafés draw on predominantly female labour to deferentially service mostly male clientele.

Several activist groups have claimed that women in maid cafés may be exploited professionally, in China and elsewhere. They say the rise of cafés and their fantastical themes has opened up a debate on the use of young women in themed entertainment industries.

Due to the above reason, it is reported local authorities have inspected some places and reinforced workplace safety and labour laws. Maid cafés are becoming more widespread but business adaptation remains troublesome for the different cultures and societies of the world.

== See also ==
- Maid in Akihabara, a short Japanese television drama
- Cosplay
- Moe (slang)
- Butler café
- Maid café
- Catgirl
