= Bon-Bon Blanco =

Japanese rock group

- Origin: Japan
- Genres: Pop rock, new wave, dance-pop, Latin
- Years active: 2002–2009
- Labels: Columbia Music Entertainment; Bouncy Records
- Past members: Anna Santos; Izumi; Mako; Ruri; Tomoyo

Bon-Bon Blanco (sometimes B3 or B^{3}) is a Japanese Latin rock and salsa group during 2002–2009. The group used to belong to Columbia Music Entertainment, but has moved to Bouncy Records in 2006.

== Members ==
Its members are:

- Anna Santos (サントス・アンナ Santosu Anna, born July 9, 1987) – Main Vocals
- Izumi (中台泉美 Nakadai Izumi, born January 2, 1988) – Conga
- Mako (桜井真子 Sakurai Mako, born October 7, 1986) – Maracas, ex-leader
- Ruri (水谷光里 Mizutani Ruri, born January 7, 1990) – Bongo
- Tomoyo (松本知世 Matsumoto Tomoyo, born March 2, 1987) – Timbales, current leader

== History ==
=== Formation of the group ===
The group formed in 2002 with 4 members of a group named Nansho Kids: Mako Sakurai, Izumi Nakadai, Tomoyo Matsumoto, and Ruri Mizutani (sister of a famous actress, Yuri Mizutani) and added Santos Anna (who appeared in a Japanese version of Annie) as a vocalist and debuted at Bandai display corner at the Tokyo Toy Show in May of the same year. Their unique style, 4 percussionists and 1 vocalist, attracted a lot of attention from media in Japan even before they debuted. With an average age of 14 at the time of debut, they were also gracing the cover of music magazines. In June of the same year, their official Website "B3 TV" was opened.

=== First single ===
On July 17, 2002, they released their first single "Ai want you!!". The song was written by Paninaro 30 (lyric) and ex-Wands Kosuke Oshima (music). During July 24 to August 28, they performed weekly concerts at a live house named Harajuku Ruido. The low cost of the cover (500 yen including drinks, roughly 5 dollars USD), the completeness of the performance, as well as the word of mouth helped to fill the house consistently.

The quality of their music had been assured because one of Japanese major record labels, Being, has been supporting them since their debut. And as the members started to improve in terms of their percussion skills, their popularity also shot up. On December 26, they had a concert at Harajuku Ruido again, and this time the live house was sold out within the same day. The door of the live house wouldn't close due to the amount of audience.

During this period of time, a selection of songs were performed without instruments and was called "Dance Version". This was met with a decent amount of critics approval, labeling them as a dance unit. With the improved abilities of the members, the frequency of the "Dance Versions" of the songs decreased, and there have been fans that wish to bring some of the dancing back.

=== Smashing Hit ===
Their 6th single, 'Bon Voyage' was used as a theme of an animation program, 'One Piece', and it became No. 8 at hit charts in Japan. And with 7th single, 'Tenohira wo Taiyo ni', they visited a lot of elementary schools, including the school Anna graduated. This song is the 4th cover song of the group after 'Conga' from Miami Sound Machine and 'Come to me' from Bobby Caldwell, And 'Ureshii Tanoshii Daisuki' from Dreams Come True, all of which are included in their 2nd album, 'B3 masterpieces 2002–2004'.

=== Rise and Fall ===
However, after the hit of 'Bon Voyage', the gap between the group aiming at and what fans require was widened graduately, and the sales of copies of each single descended along with that. And after they released 'Ai ga ippai' in 2005, although the group was sometimes guested to some concerts including a musical named 'Angel Gate', they had to take a factual leave continued for one and half years.

=== Revival ===
On July 25, 2006, they had a concert at Shibuya Bpxx, and it was the beginning of their return. On August 30, they released 'Yura Yura Yureru', from a new record label set up by the producer of Bon-Bon Blanco, Bouncy Records. This is the song they performed in Angel Gate. In this song, and they renewed the group's image changing their costumes from jeans and T-shirts to sexy bikinis. Anna challenged to rapping first time.

In 2007, the group started its activity from the concert held at Shibuya O-EAST on January 27. On February 21, they released their 11th single, '∞Changing∞. They had several free concerts in Akihabara from March to July. From July, they started monthly concert titled 'Onnna Matsuri'(女祭) at Shibuya O-West. On February 6, 2008, their first live DVD which includes this 'Onna Matsuri' was released.

=== Present ===
On May 14, 2008, Izumi left the group, and other members announced that they will continue their activity as a quartet on their official web site.

== Discography ==
=== Singles ===
- 'Ai Want You!!' (7/17/2002)
- 'Datte, Onna no Ko Nandamon!' (9/11/2002)
- 'Ai no Nurse Carnival' (2/19/2003)
- 'Namida no Hurricane' (2/19/2003) (2nd ED song for the anime series Get Backers).
- 'Vacance no Koi' (6/4/2003)
- 'Bon Voyage!' (1/14/2004)(4th theme song for the anime series One Piece)
- 'Te no Hira wo Taiyou ni' (7/14/2004)
- 'La La Kuchibue Fuite Ikou' (9/1/2004)

Note: This song's lyrics is written by Saori Atsumi.

- 'Ai ga Ippai' (2/23/2005)
- 'Yura Yura Yureru' (8/30/2006)
- '∞Changing∞' (2/21/2007) (2nd ED song for the anime series Yamato Nadeshiko Shichi Henge, also known as the Wallflower)

=== Albums ===
- BEAT GOES ON (3/26/2003)
- B3 Master Pieces 2002–2004 (3/24/2004)
- Winter Greetings (12/15/2004)

=== DVD ===
- B3 Master Clips 2002–2004 (3/24/2004)
- Onna Matsuri (2/6/2008)
