= Maid in Akihabara =

- Screenplay by: Yoshiaki Tago
- Directed by: Yoshiaki Tago
- Starring: Mako; Kentaro Nakakura; Takeshi Yoshioka
- Country of origin: Japan
- Original language: Japanese

Production
- Running time: 84 minutes

Original release
- Release: February 24, 2006

Maid in Akihabara (めいどinあきはばら, Meido in Akihabara) is a 6 episode series that was produced in Japan in 2005 and released on February 24, 2006. Each episode ran about 15 minutes, and took place in Akihabara, Tokyo - the cyber city of Japan. The story begins when a woman named Saki, an ex-bar girl, tries to find a job to hide from a group of yakuza. She ends up getting a job at a Maid cafe called Meido no miyage (Maid's gift). She is the third maid to be joining the cafe. She was homeless and starts living in a 24-hour internet cafe.

== Cast ==
=== Meido ===
- Mako - Saki Shinohara
- Risa Odagiri - Miyabi
- Mariko Fujita - Himeko

=== Others ===
- Kentaro Nakakura - 根岸肇
- Takeshi Yoshikoa - 前野貢
- Nakakura Kentaro - Hajime
- Yuuichi Koshimura - 銀角
- Andre - 金角

== See also ==
- Cosplay restaurant
- Akihabara
