= The Girl Who Leapt Through Space =

Japanese anime television series

- Promotional image of the main characters (front to back): Akiha Shishido, Itsuki Kannagi, and Honoka Kawai

宇宙をかける少女 (Sora o Kakeru Shōjo)
- Genre: Comedy, Mecha
- Created by: Hajime Yatate
- Light novel

Sora Kake Girl Prologue: Akiha
- Written by: Hajime Yatate (original author); Ryō Suzukaze (story)
- Illustrated by: Kazuyuki Yoshizumi
- Published by: Ichijinsha
- Magazine: Chara Mel
- Published: December 25, 2008
- Anime television series
- Directed by: Masakazu Obara
- Produced by: Naotake Furusato
- Written by: Jukki Hanada (1-14); Tatsuto Higuchi (9-26)
- Music by: Kenichi Sudo; Tomoki Kikuya
- Studio: Sunrise
- Licensed by: NA: Sentai Filmworks
- Original network: TV Tokyo, AT-X, TV Aichi, TV Osaka
- Original run: January 5, 2009 – June 29, 2009
- Episodes: 26
- Manga

Sora Kake Girl R
- Written by: Kunihiko Okada
- Illustrated by: Kabocha
- Published by: Ichijinsha
- Magazine: Comic Rex
- Original run: March 2009 – March 2010
- Volumes: 2
- Manga

Sora Kake Girl D
- Published by: ASCII Media Works
- Magazine: Dengeki Daioh
- Original run: April 2009 – January 2010
- Volumes: 1
- Light novel
- Written by: Tsukasa Seo
- Illustrated by: Kazuyuki Yoshizumi
- Published by: Ichijinsha
- Imprint: Ichijinsha Bunko
- Original run: June 20, 2009 – August 20, 2009
- Volumes: 2

The Girl Who Leapt Through Space (Japanese: 宇宙をかける少女, Hepburn: Sora o Kakeru Shōjo; lit. "The Spacefaring Girl" and also abbreviated as "Sora Kake Girl") is a Japanese anime television series, created and produced by Sunrise. Based on the original concept by the Sunrise animation staff, the series is directed by Masakazu Obara and written by Jukki Hanada, overseeing a team of animators noted for their previous work on My-HiME and My-Otome.

The anime began airing in Japan on the TV Tokyo television network on January 5, 2009. The series is set in the far future where humans now live in space colonies orbiting far from Earth. A manga adaptation, Sora Kake Girl R, began serialization in the March 2009 issue of Ichijinsha's Comic Rex, and another manga, Sora Kake Girl D, began serialization in the April 2009 issue of ASCII Media Works' Dengeki Daioh. A light novel adaptation began serialization in Ichijinsha's Chara Mel in December 2008, and an Internet radio show has also been created.

== Plot ==
In the year 311 of the orbital calendar, humanity has migrated to countless colony clusters in space. Akiha Shishido encounters a malevolent artificial intelligence, Leopard, who has been installed on a colony. She is joined by Inter-Colony-Police officer Itsuki Kannagi, taciturn young girl Honoka Kawai, and a robot-potato, Imoko "Imo-chan" Shishido.

== Characters ==
=== Main characters ===
Akiha Shishido (獅子堂 秋葉, Shishidō Akiha)
Voiced by: Mako
Akiha is typically a careless and dense girl who has no special talent outside of piloting QT-ARMS in combat, but she is kind, easygoing and courageous. Akiha's role as the protagonist begins in earnest when she and Imoko are swept into the gravity quake of Leopard breaching out of hyperspace while in flight from her eldest sister Kazane's marriage arrangement. Considering that she is the third of five siblings, Akiha's lack of ambition throughout much of the series is not an unreasonable outcome. In addition to piloting the war-era Starsylph QT-ARMS in combat, Akiha uses a golden gun, the Arma Ignis Aureus to assist Leopard in discharging the "Soul Shout" energy attack from the Leopard Cannon. It is shortly after Leopard's battle with Benkei that it becomes apparent that Akiha is vulnerable to Nervalist mental manipulation. While encased in a Full Cowl box aboard Xanthippe, Akiha comes to understand the attraction of Nerval's subjugation without being caught up in it thanks to Imoko's encouragement. Akiha inherited the "will" from Kagura. In Nami's attempt to kill Akiha, the EXISTENCE protected her. She was asked to destroy Leopard by Kazane.
Itsuki Kannagi (神凪 いつき, Kannagi Itsuki)
Voiced by: Aya Endō
Driven by her parents being conscripted into the Terra Abduction at the hands of a mysterious colony, Itsuki joined the Inter-Colony Police in lieu of the secondary education most teenagers are made to undergo. Itsuki dislikes making mistakes and places a heavy emphasis on her work as an ICP officer which forces her into things such as fighting Bougainvillea and Mintao as per the orders of the ICP administration from within the experimental Arc-II-Jl QT-ARMS along with initially being Akiha and Honoka's adversary as the two are collecting components for Leopard. During her time in Surre Academy as the student Mutsumi Shimoyama, Itsuki demonstrates a lack of proper social skills that causes a few awkward misunderstandings—one of which is a very destructive duel with Honoka that suggests that she may also be an Ex-QT. As she spends time around Akiha over the course of the series, Itsuki experiences an extensive anthology of events such as having the Terra Abduction incident demonstrated for her (the EXISTENCEs hypnotizing people into the Pied Piper orbital elevator for use as Nervalist vassals) along with the aftermath of Nerval's exploitation.
Honoka Kawai (河合 ほのか, Kawai Honoka)
Voiced by: Yui Makino
Awakening shortly after she boards Leopard for the first time, Honoka enrolls in the Surre Academy to stay close to Akiha who she declares as "The Girl Who Leapt Through Space". As demonstrated during her duel with Itsuki and during the early component retrieval missions, Honoka has the quantum energy manipulation capabilities endemic to Ex-QTs whose utilization for combat makes her eyes glow red and pilots the war-era Wygar QT-ARMS. In spite of being quiet most of the time and focused on Leopard's well-being, Honoka has quite an anguishing prologue that evokes some strong emotions. Once wielded as an EXISTENCE, Honoka broke away from Nerval 50 years ago with what are now the Shishido elders and fought alongside Kagura who matched her hatred for Nerval. Honoka is on borrowed time as she struggles to reconcile how things have changed over the past half-century with Kagura and Friedrich along with all the crucial actors in Nerval's recent advent. She also revealed that her life is coming to an end. After Honoka's Wygar QT-ARMS was destroyed in battle with Takane, she used her new QT-ARMS, which resembles the EXISTENCE units that Nami controls.
Leopard (レオパルド, Reoparudo)
Voiced by: Jun Fukuyama
Even before he breached out of hyperspace before Akiha and Imoko, it quickly becomes apparent that Leopard has an intricate and extensive prologue with the Shishido family. Considering his construction was financed by the Shishido Conglomerate and his fundamental programming seeing its roots in Friedrich Otto Noblemain after Nerval performed as expected, it could be argued that the aristocratic and eccentric Leopard is in a sort of family feud with his siblings who consider him the black sheep of the family. Even though he usually spends time alone in his room exciting himself into laughter and enjoying brewed tea before also taking to playing around on Akiha's laptop, Leopard realizes the high stakes involved as he charges Akiha the retrieval of specific components that were unjustly arrogated. It is for this reason that Leopard repels Benkei's persistent attempts to steal his mirrors so fiercely—even to the point of once conducting a surprise counterstrike on Benkei.
Leopard and Akiha's mutual interdependence exponentially develops over the course of the series because it is only by Akiha's assistance that the Leopard Cannon is successfully discharged while at the same time Akiha is guided through truly appreciating life for the gift it is. There is an arc near the end where Leopard annoys Kazane with his insistence on immediately rescuing Akiha heedless of its futility that suggests he has come to care about Akiha very much. Leopard has two creatures he has personally named residing in his colony, one of which is a crocodile-like creature named Crocodilias Leopardus, which is shown to have three younger Crocodilias. The other creature is an octopus-like creature named Leoparda Octopada. There is also a headless ghost which wears a golden armor and stays in the library.
Leopard has a dark side, who introduces himself as the "Prince of Darkness". The only difference is the eye colour which is blue. According to his dark side, 50 years ago, Leopard was the one who dominated the world with tremendous power and blanketed it with fear. When Benkei came to challenge him to a duel, Leopard has already switched to the dark side of his and even used his sword to damaged Benkei badly. He did not even allow anyone to enter his room. According to Fon, it is the swords that is cursed and awakened Leopard's dark side. His dark side does not require Akiha to activate his "Soul Shout" energy attack as he defeated Nerval by himself. He also recruited Nami.

=== Shishido family ===
Imoko Shishido (獅子堂 妹子, Shishidō Imoko) a.k.a. Imo-chan (イモちゃん)
Voiced by: Ai Nonaka
Because Akiha is the only one of the Shishido sisters that made time to care for her when she was newly manufactured and brought to the Shishido household as a maid, Imoko is best friends with Akiha and has been adopted as the sixth Shishido sister. As a Naviman nicknamed as a potato because of her appearance, Imoko has the capability to interface and operate almost any electronic device which delights Akiha and has even saved her life on numerous occasions throughout the series. Imoko's willingness to sacrifice herself to rescue Kirkwood from an approaching anti-matter missile inspires Nerval to intercede and have a change of heart with how he recruits people into his Utopian plans. Even with room and board at the Orbital Cafe Enigma endemic with Nerval's intercession, Imoko's inability to return to Akiha with the insight she has gained from watching Nerval as he tries to understand humans proves crucial in Akiha growing into her role as the "Girl Who Leapt Through Space".
Kazane Shishido (獅子堂 風音, Shishidō Kazane)
Voiced by: Yukari Tamura
As the first of the five Shishido sisters, Kazane administrates the Shishido Foundation estate and provides the strategic leadership necessary for the Enigma Alliance to prosecute its crusade against the Nervalists. Kazane has it demonstrated during the course of the series that it takes a lot more than the second sight inherited from Kagura and an almost congenital business sense to be a good leader as her poor family government of her younger sisters Akiha and Nami attests—both of whom end up in a bad way that ranges from merely freezing their lives in limbo to outright self-destruction. It is also through Kazane that it is demonstrated that no plan survives contact with the enemy or even her own allies, especially Akiha whose headlong rush into danger frightened for Imoko's safety near the end of the series almost jeopardizes the endgame strategy against Nerval who now wishes to co-exist with humans. She and Kagura finish their explanation of the "Girl Who Leapt Through Space" to Akiha with the directive to destroy Leopard when his evil personality Panther makes its advent.
Takane Shishido (獅子堂 高嶺, Shishidō Takane)
Voiced by: Yukana
As the second of the five Shishido sisters, the battle strength inherited from Kagura serves Takane well as she prosecutes her role as one of the squad leaders of ninja soldiers the Shishido Foundation wields in its fight against the Nervalists both on foot and from the controls of the Ravana QT-ARMS. Unfortunately, the circumstances turning sour during a recent mission become the preamble for Takane being temporarily wielded as a Nervalist vassal. Takane's emancipation from being Nerval's bodyguard comes about when Nami picks a fight with her after finding Honoka in her Wygar QT-ARMS to be an insufficient challenge for her. Of the other four Shishido sisters, Takane is the closest to understanding the agonizing distress Nami is facing.
Nami Shishido (獅子堂 ナミ, Shishidō Nami)
Voiced by: Yūka Nanri
As the fourth of the five Shishido sisters, the agoraphobic Nami demonstrates through her downfall from being a former teen model because of a nasty comment on her blog to an evil "Girl Who Leapt Through Space" that simply having common cultural and genetic origins will not lead to a worthwhile cohesive family. The Primavera staff affords Nami the capability to channel her QT powers for such things as discharging energy blasts at her enemies and controlling the EXISTENCE—the latter often being wielded as foot soldiers. As Takane and Akiha have demonstrated for them, Nami's inherited anti-QT powers will discharge as a concentric circular energy wave that cancels any other QT energy fields as a result of a direct hit at just the right time during combat. The defection of the EXISTENCE to Akiha who wanted to protect Itsuki and Honoka along with finding Imoko drives Nami into a genocidal and misanthropic psychosis as she makes a hasty retreat. As Nami bloodthirstily fumes in disgust of the world and reaffirms her volition to exterminate the human race starting with Akiha and her other three siblings, Panther flies over and invites Nami aboard the Leopard colony—which is Akiha's next destination.
Sakura Shishido (獅子堂 桜, Shishidō Sakura)
Voiced by: Momoko Saitō
As the fifth of the five Shishido sisters, the intelligence inherited from Kagura draws the attention of many universities and serves Sakura well in designing new space colonies as well as being a general handyman as evidenced by her martial arts robot bodyguard Mr. Black Belt and several other repair jobs that she prosecutes over the course of the series. The gibberish that Sakura uses when describing and explaining things is actually a customized language that Sakura has developed. Considering that Nami is the only Shishido sibling that cannot interpret it, this customized language is most likely QT energy waves channeled through her alien partner Yuupitan whose dormancy state is as her hat and scarf. While Yuupitan can move about on his own, he is quite content to act as an extra pair of hands at Sakura's very frequent request in return for Sakura transporting him.

=== Intercolony Police (ICP) ===
Soldier Ul (ソルジャーウル, Sorujā Uru)
Voiced by: Takaya Kuroda
Itsuki's partner, a combat-type Naviman. A hard boiled cool guy in personality. He has a tendency to apply odd and rather situational one-time nicknames to others. He has spoken English before and is capable of training soldiers.
Nina Stratoski (ニーナ·ストラトスキー, Nīna Sutoratosukī)
Voiced by: Naomi Shindō
The head of the ICP's mystery department and Itsuki's superior. She is also an old acquaintance of Elle Surre and Emilio Surre, who were surprised to find her with the ICP. She recently tempted Bougainvillea and Mintao to join the Mystery Department by offering them Pizza.
Bougainvillea (ブーゲンビリア, Būgenbiria)
Voiced by: Mika Kikuchi
An elite agent of the ICP's Central Public Security division, she is sent to deal with Itsuki's attempts to independently investigate the issue of the brain-colony. She has a rather childish personality. She is nicknamed Bou by her partner Mintao. She pilots the Bougailian, which is a split form from the QT-ARMS known as Bouminder. Despite being an elite, she is afraid to see dead people or badly injured people, for example Elle Surre's case. Later they joined the Mystery Department when promised pizza every day. She considers being related to Kannagi as a curse as misfortune always befall them when pursuing Kannagi or even befriending her as in episode 19. She controls her QT-ARMs with her hands only. She and Min were so well integrated into the Mystery Department that they do not fear the headless ghost. However, when Kannagi approaches them in the dark with a torchlight, they screamed and ran away.
Mintao (ミンタオ)
Voiced by: Ami Koshimizu
Bougainvillia's partner, she has a much more matured personality than Bou but takes great pride in herself. Nicknamed Min-chan by Bou. She pilots the Mintaiger, the other half of the QT-Arms Bouminder. Despite being an elite, like Bou, she also is afraid to see dead people or badly injured people, for example Elle Surre's case. Later they joined the Mystery Department when promised pizza every day. She also considers Kannagi a curse. She controls her QT-ARMs with her legs only.
Erika (エリカ)
Voiced by: Sayuri Yahagi
A traffic patrol officer in the ICP.
Lily (リリー, Rirī)
Voiced by: Eri Kitamura
Erika's partner.

=== Surre Academy ===
Julio Surre (フリオ·スール, Furio Sūru)
Voiced by: Hiro Shimono
Akiha's classmate and close friend. His family owns the Academy.
Neneko Okura (大倉 ネネコ, Ōkura Neneko)
Voiced by: Coon
An underclassman and close friend of Akiha and Julio. She has an energetic personality.
Elle Surre (エル·スール, Eru Sūru)
Voiced by: Akiko Kimura
Julio's older sister and the principal of Surre Academy. She's also a member of the Shishido Foundation's Board of Trustees and is good friends with Kazane. Later revealed to be an old acquaintance of Nina.
Emilio Surre (エミリオ·スール, Emirio Sūru)
Voiced by: Akira Ishida
Julio's older brother, as well as Akiha and Julio's homeroom teacher. He appears to have a crush on Kazane. He has knowledge of the Shishidos' battle against the Nervalists, but is mostly kept in the dark.
Shigure Shinguji (真宮寺 時雨, Shingūji Shigure)
Voiced by: Daisuke Ono
The president of the Surre Academy Student Council. He is very popular among the female students. He knows that Itsuki is from the ICP when she enrolled in the Surre Academy. He does not have any knowledge on Nerval previously. Shigure later reveals that he is also an Earth Orphan just like Itsuki.
Byakuya Subaru (昴白 夜, Subaru Byakuya)
Voiced by: Yui Kano
The vice president of the Student Council.
Akira Mikagami (御鏡 晶, Mikagami Akira)
The secretary of the Student Council. He's also a capable fighter and fights using throwing needles. It is revealed that he is also a Naviman, when his droid got damaged by Nerval's guards he was forced to use Imo's droid for a short period of time before his droid is repaired.
Yurii Sakharov (ユーリ·サハロフ, Yūri Saharofu)
A member of the Student Council and a narcissist.
Tsutsuji Baba (馬場 つつじ, Baba Tsutsuji)
Voiced by: Miyuki Sawashiro
A member of the Student Council. She aspires to be much like Shigure, the current president of the council. Later she agreed to help Aleida and serves as a partner to Benkei. She frequently uses poetic language when speaking to Benkei. Her purpose of teaming up with Benkei is to ensure that she will be noticed. She revealed that she is an independent party in the battle. Her ancestors were all Nervalists. When talking to Nerval, she admits being a Nervalist, but lost hope in Nerval, till the extent of comparing him with Pinocchio. She even said that the next time he meets Benkei, they will be in a battle.
Mitchan and Satchan (みっちゃん&さっちゃん)
Mitchan Voiced by: Yuiko Tatsumi
Satchan Voiced by: Sayuri Yahagi
Twin sisters who go to Surre Academy. Mitchan is in Akiha's class.

=== Nervalists ===
Nerval (ネルヴァル, Neruvaru)
Voiced by: Banjō Ginga
A brain-colony. Though unlike the mostly benign yet troublesome Leopard, Nerval is a malignant entity who seeks the enslavement of humanity. He is aided by a loyal movement of people known as the Nervalists. He takes the form of a yellow hair male and Takane served as his guard before she regained consciousness. He however fears Leopard as Leopard is an unpredictable character. Nerval's brain is already completed and he first attacked the lunar base, by freezing the whole moon and the fleet. Nerval wants to understand the humans and therefore starts to do so by cooking. However, after Kagura taught him that seasonings will make the Naporitan tastier, he used them on Manmaru-yaki too. When talking with Tsutsuji, he was compared to Pinocchio by her as he is similar to Pinocchio who wishes to be human. He later approached Leopard and was defeated after Leopard used his "Soul Shout" energy attack.
Benkei (ベンケイ, Benkei)
Voiced by: Naoya Uchida
Benkei is a vain brain colony who likes collecting mirrors. He rivals Leopard and e-mailed Leopard stating that Leopard's mirrors will be the 100th mirror he steals, which he successfully did when Leopard is in a traumatized condition. Leopard later took back his mirrors after assaulting Benkei. His original name is Bonapart. His weakness is irresolute as stated in the second opening. He is most likely to have become an independent party as he attacked Xanthippe under Tsutsuji's order. Leopard later gave him his mirrors as a payment for helping retrieve the Proxima Ring. When Nerval ordered him to return he was stopped by Tsutsuji and forced to obey her as she has control over his chainsaw. He was later badly damaged by Leopard.
Xanthippe (クサンチッペ, Kusanchippe)
Voiced by: Rie Tanaka
Another brain colony. Xanthippe is a supporter of Nerval's cause. In the second opening sequence, she is described as greedy, likes singing, and the weakness is tone deaf. She also treasures her "skin" very much. Xanthippe has been severely damaged after Leopard used his Sword against her.
Aleida (アレイダ, Areida)
Voiced by: Mai Nakahara
A silent and mysterious Ex-QT clad in silver armour. She serves the whims of Nerval and wields a large energy blade called a Tachyon Sword. She was later revealed to be Kagura when she reveals her identity when taking back Hako-chan.

=== Others ===
Kagura Shishido (獅子堂 神楽, Shishidō Kagura)
Voiced by: Mai Nakahara
A mysterious woman seen in Akiha's dreams within a Jazz-themed tea house, which was revealed to be Orbital Cafe Enigma, located near Jupiter. Much like Honoka, she called Akiha "The Girl Who Leapt Through Space". She is later revealed as Aleida, another agent for Nerval. She is from the Shishido family and has been fighting Nerval for a long time, but now she works for them. Now that she is on Nerval's side, she calls Nami "The Girl Who Leapt Through Space." After Nami unleashed her power, Kagura recovered, just like how Takane did. Now she is on Akiha's side.

== Terminology ==
B.O.A.R Ship
Beyond Orbit Azonal Runabout
ICP
Inter Colony Police
QET
Quantum Engineering Technology
Q-TECTOR
Quantum Transducing Environment Crosslink Terrain Operational Reinforcer
QT
Quantum Telekinesis
QT-ARMS
Quantum Technology Advanced Reinforced Maneuvering Shroud

== Development and production ==
The anime series, produced by Sunrise and Bandai Visual, began airing in Japan on the TV Tokyo television network on January 5, 2009. The animation character designs and animation for the series is overseen by Yōsuke Kabashima, who converted the original character designs by Kazuyuki Yoshizumi, whereas the mecha designs are supervised by Kazutaka Miyatake, Jun'ichi Akutsu and Noriyuki Jinguji. The music for the series is composed by Ken'ichi Sudō, Tomoki Kikuya, and the JAM Project, with two pieces of theme music being used for the episodes; one opening theme and one ending theme. The opening theme is "Rara Eve Shinseiki" (裸々イヴ新世紀; lit. 'Naked Eve New Era'), performed by Ali Project, and the ending theme is "Sora wa Shōjo no Tomodachi sa (宇宙は少女のともだちさ; lit. 'Space is a Girl's Friend') by Mako, Aya Endō, and Yui Makino. The opening theme's single was released on January 21, 2009, by Lantis and Geneon. The ending theme's single was released on February 4, 2009, by Lantis and King Records. The anime was licensed by Bandai Entertainment. At AmeCon 2010, European anime distributor Beez Entertainment announced that they had the distribution rights to the series, but when they closed, it became their last release. Following the 2012 closure of Bandai Entertainment, Sunrise announced at Otakon 2013, that Sentai Filmworks had rescued The Girl Who Leapt Through Space, along with a handful of other former Bandai Entertainment titles.

The first volume of the series' original soundtrack was released on March 25, 2009, also by Lantis and King Records. A character song single featuring songs sung by Mako (Akiha Shishidō) was released on February 25, 2009. Two more character song singles sung by Aya Endō (Itsuki Kannagi) and Yui Makino (Honoka Kawai) was released on March 11, 2009.

== Related media ==
=== Light novel ===
Before the anime series aired, a light novel entitled Sora Kake Girl Prologue: Akiha (宇宙をかける少女 プロローグ〜秋葉〜, Sora o Kakeru Shōjo Purorōgu ~Akiha~) began serialization in volume seven of Ichijinsha's Chara Mel magazine sold on December 25, 2008.

=== Manga ===
A manga adaptation entitled Sora Kake Girl R (宇宙をかける少女R, Sora o Kakeru Shōjo R) written by Kunihiko Okada and illustrated by Kabocha began serialization in the March 2009 issue of Ichijinsha's shōnen manga magazine Comic Rex which was sold on February 9, 2009. A preview of the manga appeared in the February 2009 issue of Comic Rex released on January 9, 2009. A second manga entitled Sora Kake Girl D (宇宙をかける少女D, Sora o Kakeru Shōjo D) began serialization in the April 2009 issue of in ASCII Media Works' shōnen manga magazine Dengeki Daioh sold on February 27, 2009.

=== Internet radio show ===
An Internet radio show entitled Sora o Kakeru Radio (宇宙をかけるラジオ) produced by Lantis Web Radio and Beat Net Radio had a pre-broadcast on December 25, 2008. Regular broadcasting began on January 5, 2009, and is broadcast weekly on Monday. The show is hosted by Mako who plays Akiha Shishidō in the anime adaptation, and contains three corners, or parts, of each episode.

=== Video game ===
A video game titled Sora o Kakeru Shōjo Shooting (宇宙をかける少女シューティング) was released by I.T.L. in 2009 for Nintendo's now closed DSiWare shop. Critics noted the game play as similar to Konami's famous Gradius series.
