= Chitose Get You!! =

Japanese manga series

- Cover of first manga volume

ちとせげっちゅ!! (Chitose Gecchu!!)
- Genre: Comedy, Slice of life
- Manga
- Written by: Etsuya Mashima
- Published by: Takeshobo
- English publisher: JManga
- Magazine: Manga Life Original; Manga Life MOMO
- Original run: 2002 – 2014
- Volumes: 10
- Anime television series
- Directed by: Takao Sano
- Music by: RUKA
- Studio: Silver Link
- Licensed by: NA: Crunchyroll
- Original network: KBS, AT-X, TVS
- Original run: July 1, 2012 – December 24, 2012
- Episodes: 26
- Original video animation
- Studio: Silver Link
- Released: January 26, 2013
- Runtime: 3 minutes each
- Episodes: 2

Chitose Get You!! (ちとせげっちゅ!!, Chitose Gecchu!!) is a Japanese four-panel manga series written and illustrated by Etsuya Mashima. The manga was serialized in Takeshobo's Manga Life Original and Manga Life Momo magazines from 2002 to 2014 and the chapters collected into 10 tankōbon volumes. A 26-episode anime television series adaptation animated by Silver Link aired between July 1, 2012, and December 24, 2012.

== Plot ==
The series follows Chitose Sakuraba, an eleven-year-old elementary school girl who is in love with Hiroshi Kashiwabara, at the town hall located right next to her school.

== Characters ==
Chitose Sakuraba (桜庭 ちとせ, Sakuraba Chitose)
Voiced by: Sayaka Nakaya
The main character, Chitose is an elementary school girl who has a crush on Hiroshi after he allegedly rescued her. She is strong and athletic for her age.
Hiroshi Kashiwabara (柏原 宏志, Kashiwabara Hiroshi)
Voiced by: Wataru Hatano
Hiroshi is a kind man who works at the town hall next to Chitose's school. He is often paranoid about Chitose's affections for him.
Misaki (みさき)
Voiced by: Sora Tokui
Chitose's classmate and best friend who constantly worries. She has an incredible father complex and wants to become his bride when she grows up.
Hinako Hiiragi (柊 雛子, Hiiragi Hinako)
Voiced by: Mako
Hinako is Chitose's friend and classmate who seems to always have a cosplay for every major occasion.
Asako Fuji (藤 麻子, Fuji Asako)
Voiced by: Kotono Mitsuishi
Asako is Chitose's homeroom teacher, who is constantly at odds against Chitose, primarily being her "rival" for Hiroshi's affections.
Kōhai-sensei (後輩先生; lit. 'Ms. Junior')
Voiced by: Rikako Yamaguchi
A young teacher who is Asako's junior.
Mr. Shige (シゲさん, Shige-san)
Voiced by: Shinichi Kotani
Shige is Hiroshi's boss.

== Media ==
=== Manga ===
Chitose Get You!! began as a manga series written and illustrated by Etsuya Mashima. It was serialized in Takeshobo's Manga Life Original and Manga Life Momo from September 2002 to June 2014 and the chapters collected into 10 tankōbon volumes. The manga is available in English on the JManga reader site.

=== Drama CD ===
Two drama CDs were released on December 22, 2005, and June 23, 2006, respectively.

=== Anime ===
A 26-episode anime television series adaptation animated by Silver Link aired between July 1, 2012, and December 24, 2012. The anime was streamed on Nico Nico Douga and Crunchyroll. The ending theme for episodes 1–13 is "Song of Chitose Get You!!! (ちとせげっちゅ!!の歌, Chitose Gecchu!! no Uta) by Sayaka Nakaya, Sora Tokui, and Mako. The ending theme for episodes 14 onwards is "A Thousand Years, Chitose, I Love You" (千年-ちとせ-アイラビュー, Sennen, Chitose, Ai Rabu Yū) by Rikako Yamaguchi and Asaketsu Iizuka.

==== Episode list ====
No.	Title	Original release date
1	"Chitose-chan's Days"; Transliteration: "Chitose-chan no Hibi" (Japanese: ちとせちゃんの日々)	July 1, 2012
When Chitose Sakuraba, an eleven-year-old girl, declares her "hots" for Hiroshi Kashiwabara and plans to skip class to go see him, but her tutor Asako Fuji stands in her way.
2	"The Meeting"; Transliteration: "Omiai" (Japanese: お見合い)	July 8, 2012
Chitose finds out that Hiroshi and Asako are having a marriage meeting and tries to interfere with her.
3	"An Adult's Attraction?"; Transliteration: "Otona no Miryoku?" (Japanese: 大人のみりょく?)	July 15, 2012
Chitose tries to figure out the best way to attract someone.
4	"Daddy's Girl"; Transliteration: "Papakko" (Japanese: パパっ子)	July 22, 2012
Misaki tries to figure out what to do on Father's Day.
5	"Cosplay Hinako"; Transliteration: "Kosupure Hinako" (Japanese: コスプレ雛子)	July 29, 2012
Hinako tries on various costumes for a cosplay.
6	"Sketch"; Transliteration: "Sukecchi" (Japanese: スケッチ)	August 5, 2012
Asako makes some curious observations during her class' drawing lesson.
7	"Fire Drill"; Transliteration: "Hinan Kunren" (Japanese: 避難くんれん)	August 12, 2012
The school practices a fire drill.
8	"Altogether!"; Transliteration: "Minna de!" (Japanese: みんなで!)	August 19, 2012
Hiroshi's attempt to get Chitose to play with her friends instead of bothering him backfires when she brings her entire class to his office.
9	"The Usual Days"; Transliteration: "Itsumo no Hibi" (Japanese: いつもの日々)	August 26, 2012
Chitose is constantly foiled in her plans to escape to the town hall to see Hiroshi.
10	"Tanabata" (Japanese: 七夕)	September 2, 2012
Chitose struggles to come up with a wish for Tanabata.
11	"The Teacher's Achilles Heel?"; Transliteration: "Sensei no Jakuten?" (Japanese: 先生の弱点?)	September 9, 2012
The girls try to learn Asako's weakness.
12	"The Pool Opens"; Transliteration: "Pūru Hiraki" (Japanese: プール開き)	September 16, 2012
Hinako picks a curious outfit for the swimming pool.
13	"Summer Festival"; Transliteration: "Natsumatsuri" (Japanese: 夏まつり)	September 23, 2012
At a summer festival in town, both Chitose and Asako end up fighting when Hiroshi appears.
14	"Reading Books in Autumn?"; Transliteration: "Dokusho no Aki?" (Japanese: 読書の秋？)	September 30, 2012
Misaki has trouble picking out a library book for Book Week.
15	"Sports Day"; Transliteration: "Undōkai" (Japanese: うんどうかい)	October 7, 2012
Chitose (and even Misaki and Hinako) try to makes a strong impression at the sports day.
16	"Mika Appears"; Transliteration: "Mika Tōjō" (Japanese: 美香登場)	October 14, 2012
Chitose and Asako meet Hiroshi's niece, Mika, who underestimates Chitose's strength when it comes to playing.
17	"The Meal"; Transliteration: "Oshokuji desu" (Japanese: お食事です)	October 21, 2012
Chitose and Asako go to a restaurant with Hiroshi and get on each other's nerves.
18	"Diet?"; Transliteration: "Daietto?" (Japanese: ダイエット?)	October 28, 2012
Asako goes on a diet, which gives Chitose the idea to go on one herself.
19	"Like a Girl"; Transliteration: "Onna-no-ko Rashiku" (Japanese: 女の子らしく)	November 4, 2012
After an awkward incident on the way to school, Chitose and Hinako try to help Misaki to behave more like a girl.
20	"Christmas"; Transliteration: "Kurisumasu" (Japanese: クリスマス)	November 11, 2012
Chitose and Asako think of Christmas presents to give to Hiroshi.
21	"Spring Cleaning and Memories"; Transliteration: "Ōsōji to Omoide" (Japanese: 大そうじと思い出)	November 18, 2012
Chitose encounters some disturbing mementos of her mother's whilst spring cleaning.
22	"New Year's Eve"; Transliteration: "Ōmisoka" (Japanese: 大みそか)	November 25, 2012
Chitose and co. go about giving New Year's greetings whilst Asako and Kouhai spend the day drinking.
23	"New Year's Temple Visit"; Transliteration: "Hatsumōde" (Japanese: はつもうで)	December 2, 2012
The gang visit the temple for the New Year.
24	"A Day in the Life of Kashiwabara"; Transliteration: "Kashiwabara no Ichinichi" (Japanese: 柏原の1日)	December 9, 2012
Hiroshi describes a typical day in his life.
25	"Let's Do Handmade"; Transliteration: "Tezukuri Shimasho" (Japanese: 手作りしましょ)	December 16, 2012
Asako teaches the girls how to make handmade Valentine chocolates.
26	"First One Wins!"; Transliteration: "Hayaimono Kachi!" (Japanese: 早いモノ勝ちっ！)	December 23, 2012
Chitose and Mika argue over who gets to give Hiroshi their chocolate first and end up incurring Misaki's intense anger.
