= Hanamaru Kindergarten =

Japanese manga series

- Cover of the first volume of Hanamaru Kindergarten as published by Square Enix

はなまる幼稚園 (Hanamaru Yōchien)
- Genre: Comedy, slice of life
- Manga
- Written by: Yuto
- Published by: Square Enix
- Magazine: Young Gangan
- Original run: September 2006 – October 2011
- Volumes: 11+1
- Anime television series
- Directed by: Seiji Mizushima
- Written by: Yuichiro Oguro
- Music by: Sadesper Record
- Studio: Gainax
- Licensed by: NA: Crunchyroll
- Original network: TV Tokyo
- Original run: January 10, 2010 – March 28, 2010
- Episodes: 12

Hanamaru Kindergarten (はなまる幼稚園, Hanamaru Yōchien) is a Japanese manga series written and illustrated by Yuto and published by Square Enix. The series follows Anzu, a kindergarten girl who is in love with her teacher and tries to win his affection but always fails. It has been adapted into an anime television series animated by Gainax and broadcast in Japan from January to March 2010.

== Plot ==
Anzu goes to a kindergarten with her friends, the shy Koume and the eccentric Hiiragi. Together they try to attract attention from their caretaker Tsuchida Naozumi. However, he is clearly more interested in the pretty Yamamoto Nanako, a fellow kindergarten teacher who supervises the class next door. Though Anzu tries to convince Tsuchida to marry her when she grows up, Tsuchida is trying to have a date with Yamamoto; or if not, get engaged with her.

== Characters ==
=== Teachers ===
Naozumi Tsuchida (土田 直純, Tsuchida Naozumi)
Voiced by: Satoshi Hino
Tsuchida-sensei is the only male teacher at Hanamaru Kindergarten, who started teaching in the school immediately after he graduated. At first, he is seen as unreliable, but as time passes, he gets the hang of being a teacher. He is a game otaku and plays games until late at night, often resulting in him being late for work at the kindergarten where he teaches the students of the first-year Sakura Class. Anzu develops a crush on him, but, understandably, he does not reciprocate although he does like her as he does all of his students. Anzu's mother, Sakura, called him Tsuchi when they were children (she still does), and so Anzu does as well. It is revealed in episode 7 of the anime, that he had a crush on Sakura when they were in high school. Tsuchida now has a crush on his colleague, Nanako Yamamoto. He is nicknamed "breast man" because of his habit of looking at girl model magazines and often staring at Yamamoto-Sensei's chest. In the end, the children at the kindergarten help him muster the courage to confess and he begins a relationship with Yamamoto-Sensei.
Nanako Yamamoto (山本 菜々子, Yamamoto Nanako)
Voiced by: Erino Hazuki
Yamamoto-sensei is one of the female teachers at Hanamaru Kindergarten. Even though Tsuchida likes her, she does not understand that men would fall for her. She teaches the students of first-year Peach Class. She appears to be good at sewing, as she mended Tsuchida's apron and Koume's stuffed panda-cat doll's ear. Despite her obliviousness towards romance involving her, she is aware of the fact that Hanamaru-sensei has a crush on her sister, Mayumi. Eventually, she begins to develop feelings towards Tsuchida and starts to express a greater interest in romance.
Rōze Kusano (草野 蕗央瀬, Kusano Rōze)
Voiced by: Kaoru Mizuhara
Kusano-sensei is one of the female teachers at Hanamaru Kindergarten. She likes sports and muscular men. She enjoys watching what Tsuchida does to get Yamamoto's attention. She teaches the students of second-year Sunflower Class. She was Koume's coach and helped her to train for the school sports day's footrace.
Kawashiro (川代, Kawashiro)
Voiced by: Naomi Wakabayashi
Kawashiro-sensei is one of the female teachers at Hanamaru Kindergarten who appears slightly geeky. She teaches the students of second-year Tulip Class. In the anime, she lent Anzu a sweater for her "date" with Tsuchida. She is described as lacking composure.
Kakogawa (水主川, Kakogawa)
Voiced by: Arisa Ogasawara
Kakogawa-sensei is one of the female teachers at Hanamaru Kindergarten. She has short brown hair. She is described as being mature.
Nishikaze (西風, Nishikaze)
Voiced by: Ayumi Tsunematsu
Nishikaze-sensei is one of the female teachers at Hanamaru Kindergarten. She has long black hair that goes to her waist and is described as being laid back. She has a sleepy look on her face.

=== Kindergarten students ===
Anzu (杏, Anzu)
Voiced by: Kei Shindō
Anzu is a girl in Tsuchida's class and the main protagonist of the series. She is the daughter of his childhood friend and calls him "Tsuchi", like her mother does. She has a crush on Tsuchida and, with her mother's encouragement, plans to marry him although her efforts to get his attention fail. She is friends with Koume and Hiiragi and is known to get into troublesome, and even dangerous situations, much to the consternation of her teachers. She has a wild strand of blond hair that sticks up.
Koume (小梅, Koume)
Voiced by: MAKO
Koume is a very shy, timid, and sensitive girl in Tsuchida's class. She quickly became friends with Anzu and Hiiragi upon the start of the semester. She has an older brother who gave her a red ribbon which she holds very dear to her heart. Her dream in the future is to open a cake shop. She has a crush on Yū.
Hiiragi (柊, Hiiragi)
Voiced by: Ayahi Takagaki
Hiiragi, or Hii-chan to her friends, is a girl in Tsuchida's class. She has blue hair, and big blank eyes of the same color. She quickly became friends with Anzu and Koume upon the start of the semester. She is very intelligent and knowledgeable but is easily embarrassed. Her father, who calls her Hii, works at a scientific lab. She wears random costumes in certain episodes, and when someone compliments them, she acts out the costume she is wearing. Her mouth isn't shown, even when she talks. Her dream in the future is to become an astronaut despite having to potentially study abroad and away from her friends, though she assures Anzu and Koume that she will always come back to them and they will remain friends. She has a crush on Kenji.
Yū Kobayakawa (小早川 優, Kobayakawa Yū)
Voiced by: Hiromi Igarashi
Yū is a boy who once helped Koume when she fell down and as a result Koume starts to like him. He's in the second-year Sunflower Class. In the anime, when the children return from summer break, he gives her a stuffed koala doll.
Kenji (けんじ, Kenji)
Voiced by: Manami Numakura
Kenji is a boy from second-year Sunflower Class who challenged Hiiragi to see who was smarter and lost, prompting him to start calling her "master" and decide to be her student. He develops a crush on her.
Hinagiku (雛菊, Hinagiku)
Voiced by: Mariya Ise
Hinagiku is a girl whom Tsuchida helped. She falls in love with him and enrolls in Hanamaru Kindergarten to be close to him. She is placed in the second-year Sunflower Class. Hinagiku is surprisingly very mature considering her age, and is the daughter of the head of a yakuza clan (whose members highly respect her). Anzu considers her to be a rival, but she treats her kindly.
Aoi (葵, Aoi)
Voiced by: Hiromi Igarashi
Aoi is a girl in Tsuchida's class. Her parents are fishmongers, and she is proud of them, and likes to help them with the business. She appears both in the anime and manga.

=== Others ===
Sakura (桜, Sakura)
Voiced by: Yōko Honna
Sakura is Anzu's mother and Tsuchida's childhood friend who is a year or so older than him. She encourages Anzu in her desire to marry Tsuchida (a reflection of her own marriage to her Art teacher). She got married and pregnant while in high school and did not graduate (despite having only one term to finish) because she dropped out to be with her husband when he got a job teaching at an American university. She has a wild strand of blond hair that sticks up, which Anzu seems to have inherited. Despite no longer being students, Tsuchida still calls her Senpai.
Satsuki Tsuchida (土田 さつき, Tsuchida Satsuki)
Voiced by: Shion Hirota
Satsuki is Naozumi's younger sister. She visits the kindergarten to see how Tsuchida has been doing ever since he left home. She seems to care very much for her brother's well-being, and apparently has a brother complex. She is often very eager to receive any sort of acknowledgment from Tsuchida and has a tendency to get jealous whenever Tsuchida gets close to Yamamoto. She possesses exceptional culinary skill.
Mayumi Yamamoto (山本 真弓, Yamamoto Mayumi)
Voiced by: Chiwa Saitō
Mayumi is Nanako's younger sister. She works as a part-time assistant for a manga publisher and deals with a manga artist named Hanamaru, who has a crush on her. She is rather mischievous at times when it comes to her sister, but the two are very close. She knows that her sister is very airheaded when it comes to matters of love. She is also aware that Tsuchida has a crush on her sister, and sympathizes with him, knowing that he'll have a hard time trying to get through to her. She is similarly obtuse when it comes to people's affections aimed at herself (Hanamaru-sensei in particular).
Hanamaru (花丸, Hanamaru)
Voiced by: Kōji Yusa
Hanamaru is a manga artist, the author of the manga entitled "Panda-cat", which is a hit with kindergarten children. He has a crush on his assistant, Mayumi Yamamoto.
Anzu's Father
Voiced by: Shouto Kashil
An unnamed man who is Sakura's husband and Anzu's father. He was an arts teacher and he married Sakura when she was in high school and pregnant with his daughter.

== Media ==
=== Manga ===
The manga is written and illustrated by Yuto. Hanamaru Kindergarten was serialized by Square Enix in the bimonthly Young Gangan magazine, and the chapters collected in tankōbon. Eleven volumes were released with the first one released on April 25, 2007, and the last one on 24 December 2011. Additionally, a fanbook with volume number 7.5 was released on February 25, 2010.

Outside Japan the series is licensed in Taiwan by Sharp Point Press and in Hong Kong and Macau by Jade Dynasty.

==== Volume list ====
No.	Japanese release date	Japanese ISBN
1	April 25, 2007	978-4-7575-1999-2
2	September 25, 2007	978-4-7575-2124-7
3	February 25, 2008	978-4-7575-2225-1
4	August 25, 2008	978-4-7575-2330-2
5	February 25, 2009	978-4-7575-2500-9
6	August 25, 2009	978-4-7575-2658-7
7	December 25, 2009	978-4-7575-2758-4
7.5	February 25, 2010	978-4-7575-2814-7
8	June 25, 2010	978-4-7575-2915-1
9	December 25, 2010	978-4-7575-3106-2
10	July 25, 2011	978-4-7575-3271-7
11	December 24, 2011	978-4-7575-3457-5

=== Anime ===
No.	Title	Original air date
1	"A Hanamaru Entrance Ceremony / A Hanamaru Mother"; Transliteration: "Hanamaru na Nyūgakushiki / Hanamaru na Okaasan" (Japanese: はなまるな入学式 / はなまるなおかあさん)	January 10, 2010
Today is Hanamaru Kindergarten's entrance ceremony, but new teacher Tsuchida sleeps in anyway. As he hurries to school, he runs into a little girl on the side of the road. Concerned for the girl all by herself, he talks to her. Thinking Tsuchida is hitting on her, the girl bursts with excitement. Afterward, Tsuchida rushes to the kindergarten and anxiously participates in the entrance ceremony. The mother of Anzu, the little girl Tsuchida ran into on his way to kindergarten, turns out to be Sakura, his high school classmate. Returning home after the entrance ceremony, Anzu listens to her mother tell old stories about her high school days, and Anzu begins calling Tsuchida "Tsutchi" just like her mother. As her parents are preparing for bed, Anzu watches her father give her mother a good night kiss. Sakura tells Anzu to get a kiss from her father too, but Anzu refuses, saying she will get one from her darling instead.
2	"A Hanamaru Slide / A Hanamaru Genius"; Transliteration: "Hanamaru na Suberidai / Hanamaru na Tensai" (Japanese: はなまるなすべり台 / はなまるな天才)	January 17, 2010
Still getting used to working at the kindergarten, Tsuchida panics when he is surrounded by a group of students. The agitated Tsuchida gives Anzu permission to explore the kindergarten with her new friends Koume and Hiiragi. While exploring the kindergarten, the three find a slide on the second floor. Anzu, Koume, and Hiiragi are excitedly discussing Koume's pet rabbit when second year Sunflower Class student Kenji shows up. He taunts Koume, claiming rabbits die from loneliness. When Koume is on the verge of tears, the knowledgeable Hiiragi saves the day, correcting Kenji's "facts" one after another. Kenji presents Hiiragi with a challenge to settle their know-it-all battle once and for all. Hiiragi ends up earning for herself a student.
3	"A Hanamaru Love Triangle / A Hanamaru Day in the Life"; Transliteration: "Hanamaru na Sankaku Kankei / Hanamaru na Ichinichi" (Japanese: はなまるな三角関係 / はなまるな一日)	January 24, 2010
Madly in love with Tsuchida, Anzu decides to take a chance and confess her love to him, but he does not take her seriously. Instead, Tsuchida falls over himself thanking Peach Class' Yamamoto for fixing his apron. Anzu tries to keep Yamamoto away from him to no avail. Upon seeing the situation, Hiiragi declares a love triangle between Tsuchida, Yamamoto, and Anzu. Anzu, Hiiragi, and Koume put their heads together to create a strategy of attack, desperate not to lose to Yamamoto. Peach Class' Yamamoto left her parents' home to live with her younger sister Mayumi. One day, Yamamoto decides to write a letter to her parents about her co-workers, her innocent and cute students, and the friends from Sakura Class she recently made: Hiiragi the bookworm, the kindhearted Koume, and Anzu, madly in love with Tsuchida. While writing her letter, Yamamoto recalls a particular experience she had with Anzu.
4	"A Hanamaru Date / A Hanamaru Helper"; Transliteration: "Hanamaru na Dēto / Hanamaru na Otetsudai" (Japanese: はなまるなデート / はなまるなお手伝い)	January 31, 2010
Anzu wants to have a fairytale romance with Tsuchida, but he breaks her heart when he calls it unrealistic. Following Hiiragi's advice, Anzu takes Tsuchida on the date of his dreams. Having set the time and place, Anzu instructs Tsuchida to meet her there. Days later, Tsuchida takes a day off to attend a relative's wedding, leaving Yamamoto in charge of the Sakura Class for a day. A determined Anzu offers her services to Yamamoto, who asks Anzu for various favors.
5	"A Hanamaru Detective / A Hanamaru First Love"; Transliteration: "Hanamaru na Tanteidan / Hanamaru na Hatsukoi" (Japanese: はなまるな探偵団 / はなまるな初恋)	February 7, 2010
Tsuchida turns Anzu down when she asks him out on a Sunday date, leading her to believe he's seeing another woman. When Hiiragi suggests they follow Tsuchida, Anzu, Hiiragi, and Koume unite to form the Hanamaru Detective Brigade. Unknown to the Hanamaru Detective Brigade, Sakura was also keeping an eye on Anzu, and unwittingly defended Tsuchida from two Yakuza who merely reprimanded him for littering. The next day, Hiiragi and Koume follow Anzu as she chases after Tsuchida, but Koume trips. Just as she's about to break into tears, a boy extends a helping hand. The boy, named Yu, leaves soon afterward when his friends call him, leaving Koume to stand in the hallway by herself, unable to move, perhaps awed by him.
6	"A Hanamaru Pool / A Hanamaru Plan / A Hanamaru Brother / A Hanamaru Sleepover"; Transliteration: "Hanamaru na Pūru / Hanamaru na Oniichan" (Japanese: はなまるなプール / はなまるなお兄ちゃん)	February 14, 2010
Hanamaru Kindergarten is opening its pool. Excited about her first visit to a pool with Tsuchida, Anzu hurries off to show him her swimsuit and "knock him out". Anzu is feeling pleased with herself when Tsuchida calls her cute when Yamamoto shows up in her (rather disaster-prone) swimsuit. Tsuchida's younger sister Satsuki comes to visit. However, Tsuchida forgets to leave a house key in his mailbox for Satsuki. When she sees the disheveled state of her brother, the already-angry Satsuki explodes. Satsuki begins to wonder if her hopeless brother is doing a proper job at the kindergarten, so she decides to visit him there.
7	"A Hanamaru Summer Vacation / A Hanamaru Summer Festival"; Transliteration: "Hanamaru na Natsu Yasumi / Hanamaru na Natsu Matsuri" (Japanese: はなまるな夏休み / はなまるな夏祭り)	February 21, 2010
The kindergarten's summer vacation starts the next day, and Sakura suggests they take a trip to her hometown with Hiiragi, Koume, and Tsuchida. Tsuchida gets excited when Yamamoto decides to join them, and the six of them make plans to visit the hometown of Sakura and Tsuchida. Satsuki is delighted her brother is finally visiting home, but when he spends all of his time looking after the girls and staring at Yamamoto, her mood turns sour. The situation comes to a head when Tsuchida does not even realize his sister prepared dinner. The group heads to a nearby shrine for a summer festival, but Satsuki's feelings are still unresolved.
8	"A Hanamaru Fishmonger / A Hanamaru Rival"; Transliteration: "Hanamaru na Sakanaya-san / Hanamaru na Raibaru" (Japanese: はなまるなさかなやさん / はなまるなライバル)	February 28, 2010
Summer vacation is over, and everyone in class told what they did during summer vacation. Aoi, one of the students, tells the rest of the class about her parents' work as fishmongers. Anzu, Koume, and Hiiragi went to Aoi's store and persuaded Aoi's dad to let them help. Aoi soon joined them after some persuasion from Anzu, Koume and Hiiragi. Days later, Tsuchida helps a little girl after the thong of her Zōri broke. The girl, named Hinagiku, turned out to be the daughter of the head of a Yakuza clan. The next day, Hinagiku came to Hanamaru Kindergarten and suddenly made a marriage proposal to Tsuchida, and soon transferred to Hanamaru. Hinagiku claims that she loves Tsuchida, so Tsuchida decided to make her dislike him, but failed. Anzu hears of this, earning for herself another rival.
9	"A Hanamaru Gift / A Hanamaru Dream / A Hanamaru Night"; Transliteration: "Hanamaru na Sashiire / Hanamaru na Yume / Hanamaru na Yoru" (Japanese: はなまるな差し入れ / はなまるな夢 / はなまるな夜)	March 7, 2010
With the editor sick, Mayumi Yamamoto went to get Hanamaru's transcript for the next episode of "Panda-Cat". However, Hanamaru seems to be in a slump, so he asked for some more time to finish it. Mayumi returned to the publishing office, but had to return when she forgot to give Hanamaru her gift of cakes. As Hanamaru went to the park to take a break, Anzu, Hiiragi, and Koume were playing nearby, and saw the depressed manga artist. They tried giving him advice on how to confess to Mayumi, basing on how Tsuchida-sensei is dealing with Yamamoto-sensei. Eventually they cheer him and Mayumi up with a performance of the Panda-Cat Exercise. Meanwhile, Mayumi has no idea Hanamaru's slump is because of him thinking about her. Much later, Mayumi meets her sister, who has just gone shopping with Tsuchida-sensei for things they are to use at kindergarten. There Mayumi noticed that Tsuchida-sensei likes her sister. Mayumi inadvertently took her sister away, canceling that dinner Nanako was planning for him, for a favor. That favor was to obtain Panda-Cat-related things in order to help Hanamaru become inspired to finish the manga he is working on. That night, Nana was really planning to make it up to Tsuchida-sensei, not because she understands that he likes to have dinner with her, but because she thought he was hungry that time (as Mayumi surmised). Meanwhile, Nanako thinks that invitation to see a movie was because Hanamaru likes Mayumi. Meanwhile, Sakura Class were working on drawings that talk about their ambition in life. Toshiaki wants to become a soccer player when he grows up; Anzu wants to marry Tsuchida and Hiiragi wants to become an astronaut and space adventurer (which was considered to be realistic). Koume, on the other hand, cannot choose what she wants to become--whether to be a bride, a baker, a florist, or a toy-store employee. Which brings them to the topic of why Tsuchida-sensei became a teacher. The topic caught on with the Hanamaru teachers, and it was revealed that they have their own (albeit personal) reasons. That afternoon, Kusano-sensei invited Tsuchida-sensei over to her apartment for a sleepover. There Kusano-sensei showed Tsuchida-sensei her interests: watching movies with macho men.
10	"A Hanamaru Cheer Squad / A Hanamaru Confession"; Transliteration: "Hanamaru na Ōendan / Hanamaru na Kokuhaku" (Japanese: はなまるな応援団 / はなまるな告白)	March 14, 2010
Koume's brother came to Hanamaru Kindergarten to keep an eye on her. He absolutely adores his little sister, and goes into a freeze when she is in trouble. He was there because the school field day is fast approaching, and Koume wanted to join the footrace. He is worried she'd end last and cry. Anzu and Hiiragi had an idea: for Koume to practice. Since Tsuchida-sensei cannot fill the part of a coach, they asked Kusano-sensei to be Koume's coach and trainer. On the day of the footrace, a confident Koume was leading the race, but she tripped and fell. Koume stood up to continue the race, earning the admiration of everyone. However, she started crying, so her brother went to the end of the course and called for her. She may have lost the footrace, but her brother gave her a medal for her effort. Hinagiku has her own successes in the obstacle race; while Anzu and Hiiragi finished first and second in the footrace. There her brother praised her for having many wonderful people around her. After the school sports day, the faculty of Hanamaru Kindergarten had a get-together. Much later, at karaoke, the magic of alcohol seemed to have its rather interesting effects on Yamamoto-sensei and Tsuchida-sensei, making them both looser than usual. This led to Tsuchida-sensei confessing to Yamamoto-sensei. However, alcohol also can erase memories, so Tsuchida-sensei had no idea what happened the day before, leaving Tsuchida-sensei to wonder if Yamamoto-sensei remembered what he said because he passed out before he could get a response. The next day he seemed to be out of it. Kusano-sensei advised that he should ask that directly from Yamamoto-sensei. Yamamoto-sensei thought it was a line from their favorite manga, and wished that someone would tell that to her. This led to Tsuchida-sensei thinking that she's just too unperceptive... Because of his frustration, he drank until he was too drunk to go home and sleep in a garbage pile. Anzu and her mom Sakura found him there, and Sakura got frustrated when he started thinking about quitting his job. Meanwhile, both Anzu and Hinagiku knew from Kusano-sensei about Tsuchi's confession to Yamamoto-sensei, much to their shock. However, since there was no response from Yamamoto-sensei yet, they never lost hope.
11	"A Hanamaru Uninvited Wife / A Hanamaru Story"; Transliteration: "Hanamaru na Oshikake Nyōbō / Hanamaru na O-hanashi" (Japanese: はなまるな押しかけ女房 / はなまるなお話)	March 21, 2010
Tsuchida-sensei's feelings of yelling in the rain got into him, as two days later he phoned in sick with fever. The day before, Tsuchi was kind of down, perhaps due to what happened a few days ago concerning Yamamoto-sensei. Anzu then came to visit Tsuchida, but she ended up the one being baby-sitted by him as Anzu encountered one trouble after another while trying to take care of Tsuchida. When Tsuchida-sensei got better, he ramps up his efforts to tell Yamamoto-sensei how he feels for her. However, her being dense quite frustrated him, so, that night, while Anzu was around, he told the story of The Clumsy Prince and The Dense Princess, which kind of mirrors his relationship between him and Yamamoto-sensei.
12	"A Hanamaru Christmas / A Hanamaru Feeling"; Transliteration: "Hanamaru na Kurisumasu / Hanamaru na Kimochi" (Japanese: はなまるなクリスマス / はなまるな気持ち)	March 28, 2010
It's Christmas time and everyone is going to Anzu's house for a party. But during preparations Anzu falls asleep, asking Santa to grant a wish for her. In her dream she becomes an adult and heads off to meet Tsuchida, but gets distracted along the way and forgets what she came there to do. In the midst of her distraction she is directed by an adult Hiiragi and Koume to board a bus that Tsuchida would board later. They both end up getting off at the same spot and dancing in the snow together before sharing a kiss. While kissing Anzu wishes to be able to actually be with Tsuchida one day. Later, Anzu and the gang went to an art gallery where there is an exhibition showing Anzu's father's paintings. Part of the collection is a painting depicting Sakura and Anzu as a baby. This leads to the story that tells that Tsuchida was the one who encouraged Sakura to continue pursuing her husband. It is also revealed that Tsuchida originally told Sakura "Nothing is stronger than the power of love", which is the same thing Sakura likes to tell Anzu in order to encourage her to not give up on Tsuchida. In effect Tsuchida's words back then are the reason Anzu was born and is still pursuing Tsuchida. After they leave the gallery, Tsuchida has been asked to watch over Anzu temporarily, though he also wants to spend more time with Yamamoto-sensei. However, with Anzu around (and he cannot really be alone with Yamamoto-sensei), he loses his courage and tells Yamamoto-sensei that he will see her tomorrow. That made Anzu very upset and said that Tsuchida shouldn't give up on Yamamoto-sensei. Tsuchida is confused by this but Anzu insists that she wants to be his bride and for him to be happy and that he shouldn't give up on Yamamoto-sensei. Feeling encouraged Tsuchida rushes back to Yamamoto-sensei and attempts to confess. However, Yamamoto-sensei accidentally misinterprets what he means and thinks that he is talking about something work related, effectively foiling Tsuchida's confession. The next day we see Tsuchida and Yamamoto-sensei putting on a puppet show portraying the tale of The Clumsy Prince and The Dense Princess during the Christmas party and they seem to be quite happy.
