= Outline of video games =

Overview of and topical guide to video games

The following outline is provided as an overview and topical guide to video games:

Video game – an electronic game that involves interaction with a user interface to generate visual feedback on a video device. The word video in video game traditionally referred to a raster display device, but following the popularization of the term "video game", it now refers to any type of display device. It can be played on your own, locally, or across the world.

== Video game genres ==
Video game genres are categories of video games based on gameplay interaction and sets of gameplay challenges

- List

=== Action game ===
Action game – a video game genre that emphasizes physical challenges, including hand–eye coordination and reaction-time.

- Beat 'em up – a video game genre featuring melee combat between the protagonist and a large number of underpowered antagonists.
- Fighting game – a genre where the player controls an on-screen character and engages in close combat with an opponent.
- Platformer – requires the player to control a character to jump to and from suspended platforms or over obstacles (jumping puzzles).
- Shooter game – wide subgenre that focuses on using some sort of weapon often testing the player's speed and reaction time.
  - First-person shooter – a video game genre that centers the gameplay on gun and projectile weapon-based combat through first-person perspective; i.e., the player experiences the action through the eyes of a protagonist.
    - Boomer shooter – a genre emulating the style of 1990s FPS games
  - Light-gun shooter – a genre in which the primary design element is aiming and shooting with a gun-shaped controller.
  - Shoot 'em up – a genre where the player controls a lone character, often in a spacecraft or aircraft, shooting large numbers of enemies while dodging their attacks.
  - Third-person shooter – a genre of 3D action games in which the player character is visible on-screen, and the gameplay consists primarily of shooting.
  - Hero shooter – multiplayer first- or third-person shooters that strongly encourage cooperative play between players on a single team through the use of pre-designed "hero" characters that each possess unique attributes, skills, weapons, and other activated abilities.
  - Tactical shooter – includes both first-person shooters and third-person shooters and simulates realistic combat, thus making tactics and caution more important than quick reflexes in other action games.
- Survival game – a genre that is set in a hostile, intense, open-world environment, where players generally begin with minimal equipment and are required to collect resources, craft tools, weapons, and shelter, and survive as long as possible.
  - Battle royale game – a subgenre that blends the survival, exploration, and scavenging elements of a survival game with last-man-standing gameplay.

=== Action-adventure game ===
Action-adventure game – a video game genre that combines elements of both the adventure game and the action game genres.

- Open world – a type of video game level design where a player can roam freely through a virtual world and is given considerable freedom in choosing how to approach objectives.
  - Grand Theft Auto clone – a type of open world design where the player is given a simulated environment and, optionally, exterminate the local inhabitants. See also Grand Theft Auto.
  - Metroidvania – a type of level design where a player is in a more restrictive environment and tasked with an end goal objective, usually with an emphasis on gathering powering ups from exploring the environment.
- Stealth game – a type of game where the objective is to remain undetected from hostile opponents.
- Horror game
  - Survival horror – a type of game where fear is a primary factor in play, usually by restricting useful or power-up items in a dark, claustrophobic environment.

=== Adventure game ===
Adventure game – a video game in which the player assumes the role of protagonist in an interactive story driven by exploration and puzzle-solving instead of physical challenge.

- Graphic adventure game – any adventure game that relies on graphical imagery, rather than being primarily text-based.
  - Escape the room – a subgenre of adventure game which requires a player to escape from imprisonment by exploiting their surroundings.
- Interactive fiction – games in which players input text commands to control characters and influence the environment. In some interactive fiction, text descriptions are the primary or only way the simulated environment is communicated to the player.
- Interactive film – a type of video game that features highly cinematic presentation and heavy use of scripting, often through the use of full-motion video of either animated or live-action footage.
- Visual novel – a type of adventure game featuring text accompanied by mostly static graphics, usually with anime-style art, or occasionally live-action stills or video footage

=== Role-playing video game ===
Role-playing video game (RPG): a video game genre with origins in pen-and-paper role-playing games such as Dungeons & Dragons, using much of the same terminology, settings and game mechanics. The player in RPGs controls one character, or several adventuring party members, fulfilling one or many quests.

- Action role-playing game – a loosely defined subgenre of role-playing video games that incorporate elements of action or action-adventure games, emphasizing real-time action where the player has direct control over characters, instead of turn-based or menu-based combat.
  - Hack and slash – a type of gameplay that emphasizes combat.
  - Role-playing shooter – a subgenre, featuring elements of both shooter games and action RPGs.
- Dungeon crawl – a type of scenario in fantasy role-playing games in which heroes navigate a labyrinthine environment, battling various monsters, and looting any treasure they may find.
  - Roguelike – a subgenre of role-playing video games, characterized by randomization for replayability, permanent death, and turn-based movement.
- MUD – a multiplayer real-time virtual world, with the term usually referring to text-based instances of these.
- Massively multiplayer online role-playing game – a genre of role-playing video games in which a very large number of players interact with one another within a persistent virtual world.
- Tactical role-playing game – a subgenre of role-playing video games that incorporate elements of strategy video games

=== Simulation video game ===
Simulation video game – a diverse super-category of video games, generally designed to closely simulate aspects of a real or fictional reality.

- Construction and management simulation – a type of simulation game in which players build, expand or manage fictional communities or projects with limited resources.
  - Business simulation game – games that focus on the management of economic processes, usually in the form of a business.
  - City-building game – games in which players act as the overall planner and leader of a city, looking down on it from above, and being responsible for its growth and management.
  - Government simulation game – a game genre that attempts to simulate the government and politics of all or part of a nation.
- Life simulation game – simulation video games in which the player lives or controls one or more virtual lifeforms.
  - Virtual pet – a type of artificial human companion, usually kept for companionship or enjoyment. Virtual pets are distinct in that they have no concrete physical form other than the computer they run on.
  - God game – a type of life simulation game that casts the player in the position of controlling the game on a large scale, as an entity with divine/supernatural powers, as a great leader, or with no specified character, and places them in charge of a game setting containing autonomous characters to guard and influence.
  - Social simulation game – a subgenre of life simulation games that explores social interactions between multiple artificial lives.
    - Dating sim – a subgenre of social simulation games that focuses on romantic relationships.
- Sports game – games that simulate the practice of traditional sports.

=== Strategy video game ===
Strategy video game – a genre that emphasizes skillful thinking and planning to achieve victory. They emphasize strategic, tactical, and sometimes logistical challenges. Many games also offer economic challenges and exploration.

- 4X game – a genre in which players control an empire and "explore, expand, exploit, and exterminate".
- Artillery game – the generic name for either early two- or three-player (usually turn-based) computer games involving tanks fighting each other in combat or similar derivative games.
- Real-time strategy (RTS) – a subgenre of strategy video game which does not progress incrementally in turns.
  - Tower defense – a genre where the goal of the game is to try to stop enemies from crossing a map by building towers which shoot at them as they pass.
- Real-time tactics – a subgenre of tactical wargames played in real-time simulating the considerations and circumstances of operational warfare and military tactics, differentiated from real-time strategy gameplay by the lack of resource micromanagement and base or unit building, as well as the greater importance of individual units and a focus on complex battlefield tactics.
- Multiplayer online battle arena (MOBA) – a hybrid of real-time strategy, role-playing and action video games where the objective is for the player's team to destroy the opposing side's main structure with the help of periodically spawned computer-controlled units that march towards the enemy's main structure.
- Tactical role-playing game – a type of video game which incorporates elements of traditional role-playing video games and strategy games.
- Turn-based strategy – a strategy game (usually some type of wargame, especially a strategic-level wargame) where players take turns when playing.
- Turn-based tactics – a genre of strategy video games that through stop-action simulates the considerations and circumstances of operational warfare and military tactics in generally small-scale confrontations as opposed to more strategic considerations of turn-based strategy (TBS) games.
- Wargame – a subgenre that emphasize strategic or tactical warfare on a map, as well as historical (or near-historical) accuracy.

=== Vehicle simulation game ===
Vehicle simulation game – games in which the objective is to operate a manual or motor powered transport.

- Flight simulation video game – a game where flying vehicles is the primary mode of operation.
  - Combat flight simulator – a type of game where players simulate the handling of military aircraft and their operations.
- Racing game – a type of game where the player is in a racing competition.
  - Driving simulator – a type of game where the player is tasked with using a vehicle as if it were real.
  - Sim racing – a type of game where the player is tasked with using a realistic vehicle inside a racing competition.
- Space flight simulation game – a type of game meant to emulate the experience of space flight.
- Submarine simulator – a type of game where the player commands a submarine.
- Train simulator – a simulation of rail transport operations.
- Vehicular combat game – a type of game where vehicles with weapons are placed inside of an arena to battle.

=== Other genres ===
- Adult game – a game which has significant sexual content (like an adult movie), and are therefore intended for an adult audience.
  - Eroge – a Japanese video game that features erotic content, usually in the form of anime-style artwork.
- Advergame – the practice of using video games to advertise a product, organization or viewpoint.
- Art game – a video game that is designed in such a way as to emphasize art or whose structure is intended to produce some kind of reaction in its audience.
- Audio game – an interactive electronic game wherein the only feedback device is audible rather than visual.
- Christian video game – any video game centered around Christianity or Christian themes.
- Educational game – video games that have been specifically designed to teach people about a certain subject, expand concepts, reinforce development, understand an historical event or culture, or assist them in learning a skill as they play.
- Fitness game – video games that are also a form of exercise and rely on technology that tracks body movement or reaction.
- Maze video games – video game genre description first used by journalists during the 1980s to describe any game in which the entire playing field was a maze.
- Music video game – a video game where the gameplay is meaningfully and often almost entirely oriented around the player's interactions with a musical score or individual songs.
  - Rhythm game – games that challenge the player's sense of rhythm and focus on dance or the simulated performance of musical instruments, and require players to press buttons in a sequence dictated on the screen.
- Party video games: games commonly designed as a collection of simple minigames, designed to be intuitive and easy to control and to be played in multiplayer.
- Puzzle video game – video games that emphasize puzzle solving, including logic, strategy, pattern recognition, sequence solving, and word completion.
- Serious game – a video game designed for a primary purpose other than pure entertainment, generally referring to products used by industries like defense, education, scientific exploration, health care, emergency management, city planning, engineering, religion, and politics.
- Incremental game

=== Other types of video games ===
- Casual game – a game of any genre that is targeted for a mass audience of casual gamers. Casual games typically have simple rules and require no long-term time commitment or special skills to play.
- Indie game – games created by individuals or small teams without video game publisher financial support, often focusing on innovation and relying on digital distribution.
- Minigame – a short or more simplistic video game often contained within another video game.
- Non-game – software that lies on the border between video games, toys and applications, with the main difference between non-games and traditional video games being the apparent lack of goals, objectives and challenges.
- Programming game – a game where the player has no direct influence on the course of the game. Instead a computer program or script is written that controls the actions of the characters.

== Video game hardware platforms ==
- Arcade game – a coin-operated entertainment machine, usually installed in public businesses such as restaurants, bars, and amusement arcades. Arcade games include video games, pinball machines, electro-mechanical games, redemption games, and merchandisers (such as claw machines).
  - Arcade cabinet – the housing within which a video arcade game's hardware resides.
  - List of arcade games
  - List of pinball machines
- Video game console – a consumer entertainment device consisting of a customized computer system designed to run video games.
  - Lists
    - List of video game consoles by generation
    - List of dedicated video game consoles
    - List of handheld game consoles
    - List of home video game consoles
      - List of first generation home video game consoles
    - List of microconsoles
    - List of video game console emulators
    - List of retro style video game consoles
    - List of best-selling game consoles
      - List of best-selling game consoles by region
    - List of PowerPC-based game consoles
  - Console game – a video game played on a video game console.
  - Dedicated console – a video game console that is dedicated to a built in game or games, and is not equipped for additional games, via cartridges or other media.
  - Console wars – a term used to refer to periods of intense competition for market share between video game console manufacturers.
  - Handheld game console – a lightweight, portable consumer electronic device with a built-in screen, game controls and speakers.
    - Handheld video game – a video game played on a handheld game console.
- Mobile game – a video game played on a mobile phone, smartphone, PDA, tablet computer or portable media player.
- Online game – a game played over some form of computer network.
  - Browser game – a video game that is played over the Internet using a web browser.
  - Cloud gaming
  - Massively multiplayer online game (MMO): a multiplayer video game which is capable of supporting hundreds or thousands of players simultaneously.
- PC game – a video game played on a personal computer, rather than on a video game console or arcade machine.
- Blockchain game

== Gameplay ==
- Gamer
  - Single-player
  - Multiplayer game
    - Cooperative gameplay
    - Cheating in online games
      - Boosting (video games)
- Cheating
- Difficulty level
- Gaming computer
- Speedrunning
- Ludonarrative dissonance
- Strategy guide

== Specific video games ==
- Lists of video games
  - Category:Lists of video games by platform
    - List of arcade games
- Lists of cancelled video games
- List of best-selling video games
- List of best-selling video game franchises
- List of video games considered the best
- List of video games notable for negative reception
- List of cult video games
- List of video games based on comics
  - List of video games based on DC Comics
  - List of video games based on Marvel Comics
- List of video games based on anime or manga
- List of video games based on cartoons
  - List of Disney video games
  - List of Hanna-Barbera video games
  - List of Looney Tunes video games

== Video game industry ==
- Lists of video game companies
  - List of video game developers
  - List of video game publishers
  - List of indie game developers
  - List of largest video game companies by revenue
- List of assets owned by Activision
- List of assets owned by Electronic Arts
- List of assets owned by Embracer Group
- List of assets owned by PlayStation Studios
- List of assets owned by Take-Two Interactive
- List of assets owned by Tencent
- List of assets owned by Xbox Game Studios
- List of commercial failures in video games
- List of video game industry people
- List of video game franchises
- Game studies
- Video game packaging
- Nintendo Seal of Quality
- Video game award
- Video game journalism
- Retailers
  - GameStop

=== Video games by country ===
==== Africa ====
- Video games in Kenya
- Video games in Nigeria
- Video games in South Africa

==== Asia ====
- Video games in Bangladesh
- Video games in China
- Video games in India
- Video games in Indonesia
- Video games in Japan
- Video games in Malaysia
- Video games in South Korea
- Video games in Thailand

==== Europe ====
- Video games in Belgium
- Video games in France
- Video games in Germany
- Video games in Lithuania
- Video games in the Czech Republic
- Video games in the Netherlands
- Video games in the Republic of Ireland
- Video games in Russia
- Video games in the United Kingdom
- Video games in Ukraine

==== North America ====
- Video games in Canada
- Video games in the United States

==== Oceania ====
- Video games in Australia
- Video games in New Zealand

==== South America ====
- Video games in Brazil
- Video games in Colombia

=== Video game development ===
Video game development – the software development process by which a video game is developed and video game developer is a software developer (a business or an individual) that creates video games.

Video game developer – a software developer (a business or an individual) that creates video games.

Independent video game development – the process of creating indie video games without the financial support of a video game publisher, usually designed by an individual or a small team.

- Game art design – a process of creating 2D and 3D game art for a video game, such as concept art, item sprites, character models, etc.
  - Video game artists: an artist who creates art for one or more types of games and are responsible for all of the aspects of game development that call for visual art.
  - Video game graphics – variety of individual computer graphic techniques that have evolved over time, primarily due to hardware advances and restrictions.
  - Video game art – the use of patched or modified video games or the repurposing of existing games or game structures.
  - Concept art – a form of illustration where the main goal is to convey a visual representation of a design, idea, and/or mood before it is put into the final product.
  - Procedural texture – a form of illustration where the main goal is to convey a visual representation of a design, idea, and/or mood for use in films, video games, animation, or comic books before it is put into the final product.
  - 2D computer graphics – computer-based generation of digital images—mostly from two-dimensional models (such as 2D geometric models, text, and digital images) and by techniques specific to them.
  - 3D computer graphics – graphics that use a three-dimensional representation of geometric data (often Cartesian) that is stored in the computer for the purposes of performing calculations and rendering 2D images.
- Game modification – are made by the general public or a developer, and can be entirely new games in themselves, but mods are not standalone software and require the user to have the original release in order to run.
- Game music – musical pieces or soundtracks and background musics found in video games ranging from a primitive synthesizer tune to an orchestral pieces and complex soundtracks.
- Game producer – the person in charge of overseeing development of a video game.
- Game programming – the programming of computer, console or arcade games.
  - Game programmer – a software engineer, programmer, or computer scientist who primarily develops codebase for video games or related software, such as game development tools.
  - Game engine – a system designed for the creation and development of video games.
  - Game Artificial intelligence – techniques used in computer and video games to produce the illusion of intelligence in the behavior of non-player characters (NPCs).
- Game publisher – a company that publishes video games that they have either developed internally or have had developed by a video game developer.
- Game studies – the discipline of studying games, their design, players, and their role in society and culture more broadly.
- Game testing – a software testing process for quality control of video games, primary function being the discovery and documentation of software defects (aka bugs).
- Game journalism – a branch of journalism concerned with the reporting and discussion of video games.
- Level design – a discipline of game development involving creation of video game levels—locales, stages, or missions.
  - Level editor (tool) – a software tool used to design levels, maps, campaigns, etc. and virtual worlds for a video game.
- Video game design – the process of designing the content and rules of a game in the pre-production stage and design of gameplay, environment, storyline, and characters during production stage.
- Other concepts
  - Interaction design
  - Expansion pack
  - Video game remake
  - Fan translation of video games
  - Fan game
  - XGameStation

== History of video games ==
=== By period ===
- Early history of video games
  - Pong
- History of first generation video game consoles (1972–1977)
- History of second generation video game consoles (1976–1984)
- History of third generation video game consoles (1983–1992)
- History of fourth generation video game consoles (1987–1996)
- History of fifth generation video game consoles (1993–2006)
- History of sixth generation video game consoles (1998–2015)
- History of seventh generation video game consoles (2005–2020)
- History of eighth generation video game consoles (2011–)
- History of ninth generation video game consoles (2020–)

==== By decade ====
- 1980s in video games
- 1990s in video games
- 2000s in video games
- 2010s in video games
- 2020s in video games

==== By year ====
Prior to 1972
1970 · 1971 · 1972 · 1973 · 1974 · 1975 · 1976 · 1977 · 1978 · 1979
1980 · 1981 · 1982 · 1983 · 1984 · 1985 · 1986 · 1987 · 1988 · 1989
1990 · 1991 · 1992 · 1993 · 1994 · 1995 · 1996 · 1997 · 1998 · 1999
2000 · 2001 · 2002 · 2003 · 2004 · 2005 · 2006 · 2007 · 2008 · 2009
2010 · 2011 · 2012 · 2013 · 2014 · 2015 · 2016 · 2017 · 2018 · 2019
2020 · 2021 · 2022 · 2023 · 2024 · 2025 · 2026 ·

=== By platform ===
- History of arcade games
  - Golden age of arcade video games
  - Timeline of arcade video game history
- Chronology of console role-playing games
- History of video game consoles
  - Video game crash of 1983
- History of personal computer games

=== By genre ===
- History of action games
- History of action-adventure games
- History of adventure games
- History of role-playing video games
- History of sports games
- History of strategy video games

== Culture ==
- Video game art
- Video game collecting
- Game studies
- Gamers Outreach Foundation
- Gender representation in video games
- Video game journalism
- PitchYaGame
- Women and video games
- Video game addiction
- Gaming etiquette

== People influential in video games ==
- List of video game industry people
- List of women in the video game industry
- List of esports players

== See also ==
- Game classification
- Nonviolent video game
- ROM
- Strategy guide
- Texture artist
- Unlockable game
- Video game accessibility
- Video game console emulator
- Sexual content in video games
- Video game controversies
- Game controller
- Video game modding

Lists

- List of video games based on anime or manga
- List of books about video games
- List of novels based on video games
- List of films based on video games
- List of television series based on video games
- List of anime based on video games
- List of video game webcomics
- List of video game websites
