= Video games in Venezuela =

In Venezuela, the Mediatech videogame was founded by four partners, including engineer and developer José Rafael Marcano, and in 1996 it launched the educational videogame series Las aventuras de Umi. At the time, Mediatech was one of only two or three video game developers in Latin America, and Las aventuras de Umi sold more than 350,000 copies, a very successful release. The studio also worked with the Children's Museum of Caracas, for which more than ten advergames were developed.

In 2004, the video game developer Tom Scripts released Crazy Bus, an unlicensed vehicle simulation game originally created as a tech demo for the Sega Genesis. The game gained notoriety on the internet due of its bizarre, scrambled music described as "one of the most over-the-top and intolerably shrill soundtracks of all time" by Screen Rant.

In 2016, the indie video game studio Sukeban Games released VA-11 Hall-A, a visual novel that is considered the most popular and best Venezuelan game.

In 2021, indie game developer Carl Zitelmann released Choro 2021, a game that follows a cowboy in a dystopian Venezuela as a metroidvania game.

In 2025, siblings Ronald and Katty Kanzler released a mobile word game in which the player must guess Venezuelan colloquial words and phrases. The game reached popularity in platforms like TikTok and Instagram where multiple Venezuelans played and discussed about the game.

== See also ==
- Hispanic and Latino representation in video games
- Video games in Brazil
- Video games in Colombia
- Video games in Latin America
- Category:Video games developed in Venezuela
