= Video games in Brazil =

Brazil is the 9th-largest video game market in the world as of 2023, and the largest in Latin America, with a revenue of 2.6 billion US dollars. Video games were not permitted for import into Brazil until the 1990s, and were then heavily taxed as non-essential goods. As a result, a grey market developed around pirating games, driven by the lack of official channels for purchasing games. Many game companies avoided expansion into the country for these reasons until 2009. An exception was Sega, which retained a strong foothold in the country with the Master System and Mega Drive. Blaming high tariffs, Nintendo officially left the market in 2015, but returned in 2017, though Nintendo actually returned in 2020 with Nintendo Switch. In a three-episode series named Red Bull Parallels, Red Bull explored the country's relation with gaming.

== History ==
The first consoles manufactured in Brazil were in the style of Pong, in the late 1970s, with TVBol being the first one completely manufactured and distributed in the country, launched in Rio de Janeiro in 1976. Following that, other Pong clones entered the market, such as the well-known Telejogo and Telejogo II by Philco/Ford, and later the TvJogo3 and TVjogo4 by Superkit, and the Videorama.

Starting in the 1980s, the production of national original games began. The 2022 Brazilian Game Industry booklet by Abragames divides this history into four segments:

=== 1983 to 1992 - The Pioneers ===
The title screen of Renato Degiovani's Amazônia, the first commercial video game made in Brazil.

The first known commercial Brazilian game was Amazônia, a text adventure developed by Renato Degiovani in January 1983 and published later that year by Micro Sistemas (pt) in its August 1983 edition. In this initial phase of the industry, individual developers and small groups were part of a rich community of game creators for MSX, ZX Spectrum, and Apple II, and later for PCs with MS-DOS, distributed in magazines, cassette tapes, and floppy disks.

During this time, the protectionist policies created by the military governments in Brazil prevented the official importation of microcomputers and video games. It was an era marked by various global console clones and official software piracy, as there were no means for importing and exporting games. There was also smuggling of game cartridges for clone consoles developed in the Manaus Free Trade Zone. This first phase of the industry could not withstand the successive economic plans and hyperinflation of the 1980s and early 1990s.

In 1987, Tectoy was founded and, despite being a young company, eventually struck up a licensing agreement with Sega to become the official distributor of the Master System in Brazil. Tectoy's marketing efforts included television commercials, magazines, and a daily program called Master Dicas (later Sega Dicas) on Rede Globo. The Master System in Brazil dominated 85% of the market over its competitors (mostly Famiclones) to the extent that it became the only country where the Master System outsold the NES.

In 1991, Tectoy published Sega's Phantasy Star, which gained widespread media attention in Brazil due to it being one of the first console games localized into Brazilian Portuguese. This translation, in addition to the extensive marketing campaign by Tectoy, helped establish role-playing games' place in the Brazilian video game market.

Notable titles: Amazonia (TILT Online, 1983), Aeroporto 83 (TILT Online, 1983).

=== 1993 to 2001 - CD-ROM Era ===
While games in the first phase of the industry were primarily developed by individual developers, development groups and companies focused on the emerging CD-ROM game distribution market started to appear. In 1997, the game Guimo by Southlogic became the first documented Brazilian game to be internationally distributed by Airsoft in Germany. Outlive by Continuum was the first Brazilian game to be distributed in 2001 by a major publisher, Take-Two Interactive.

The first Brazilian game publisher was Brasoft, which started its activities in 1990, licensing and distributing international games in Brazil from producers such as LucasArts and Sierra Entertainment. It was sold to Pi Editora in 1998 and became known for publishing games based on TV Globo properties, such as Big Brother Brasil (2002) and No Limite (2002).

In the console market, in 1993, Gradiente, together with Estrela, created Playtronic, which represented Nintendo in Brazil to compete with Tectoy, which represented its competitor, Sega.

Notable titles: Enigma da Esfinge (44 Bico Largo, 1996); Guimo (Southlogic Studios, 1997); Incidente em Varginha (Perceptum Informática, 1998); Outlive (Continuum Entertainment, 2000); Show do Milhão (SBT Multimídia, 2000).

=== 2002 to 2010 – Industry Organization ===
This phase was mostly characterized by industry coordination efforts. In 2002, GameNet – Paraná Network of Entertainment Game Companies, started organizing In2Game – International Congress of Technology and Innovation in Computer Games, the first major gathering of industry companies.

In the same year, the SBC – Brazilian Computing Society organized WJogos – Brazilian Workshop on Games and Digital Entertainment, an event for researchers, programmers, and game developers focused on computer science. In 2004, the events joined forces and organized the first SBGames – Brazilian Symposium on Games and Digital Entertainment, which also launched the 1st Independent Games Festival of Brazil. Finally, in 2004, the Abragames – Brazilian Association of Electronic Game Developers was founded, and its first sector mapping, promoted by the association that year, identified the existence of 55 companies in Brazil.

Returning to 2003, this year marked the first time that electronic games became a specific agenda item in Brazilian politics, with the sector being recognized by the Ministry of Culture, under the leadership of then Minister Gilberto Gil. It was in this context that the first call for projects specifically for the electronic game sector was launched in 2004, named JogosBR. This call had a new edition in 2005 and was reissued in 2008 under the name BRGames.

Notable games from this period include Trophy Hunter 2003, released by Southlogic in 2002, the first national custom-made game for the international market, commissioned by Infogames in the US. With the high costs and difficulties of distributing games on CD-ROM and the expansion of internet access, the first decade of the 21st century was also marked by a series of Brazilian games that focused on multiplayer online experiences. The first registered Brazilian MMO was Futsim by Jynx Playware in 2003. In the following year, the MMORPG Erinia by Ignis Games was released. Another notable Brazilian game in the genre was Taikodom by Hoplon, launched in 2008. In 2009, the first acquisition of a Brazilian studio by an international publisher took place, with Southlogic being purchased by Ubisoft. However, Ubisoft Brazil Studio would close in less than two years. During this decade, Brazil won a Bronze Lion at Cannes with the game WeAther, developed by game developer Fabiano Onça for Greenpeace Brazil.

The first higher education courses in the field in Brazil emerged during this time, such as the bachelor's degree in Game Design at Anhembi Morumbi University (2003); Technologist degree in Digital Games at Cruzeiro do Sul University (2005); Technologist degree in Digital Games at PUC-SP (2006) in São Paulo, SP; and Technologist degree in Digital Games at PUC Minas (2006). This was a thriving time for the development of national games on social platforms (Orkut) and mobile platforms (due to the emergence of the App Store business model, which facilitated and made game publishing more transparent), as well as the use of Flash, which was later discontinued. Many small advergames were developed during this period.

Notable titles: Trophy Hunter 2003 (Southlogic Studios, 2002); Futsim (Jynx Playware, 2003); Erinia (Ignis Games, 2004); Taikodom (Hoplon, 2008).

=== 2011 to 2017 – Opening the Doors to the Global Industry ===
During this decade, the industry saw its revenue double in size. The popularization of game development engines like Unity, increased internet access among the population, the advent of digital game distribution, the arrival of the first wave of professionals trained in the field, and the emergence of smartphones were factors that created a new paradigm in the industry. The phenomenon of independent game development, or indie, brought new and talented game creators into the market. However, many ventures in the industry did not survive, as their operations either changed completely or simply became economically unviable.

In this process of renewal, the Brazilian industry finally began to break down barriers that hindered the success of domestic games on a global scale. Games like Knights of Pen and Paper by Behold Studios, Oniken by Joymasher, and Momodora by Bombservice took advantage of the rise of indies and became successful internationally. The emergence of the App Store in 2007 with the iPhone gave rise to companies that would become market leaders by exploring the growing and untapped segment of smartphone games, such as Tapps Games, TFG (which later became Wildlife), and Fanatee.

In 2011, the Socioenvironmental Institute won 3rd place in the Digital and Interactive category at the 5th comKids Festival - Prix Jeunesse Iberoamericano with the MMORPG Aldeia Virtual, developed by 8D Games. In the structuring of the industry's relationship with the government, the decade also began with a historic milestone: the realization of the 1st Workshop for the Creation of Projects for the Development of a Digital Games Industry in Brazil. Organized by the then Ministry of Development, Industry, Foreign Trade, and Services (MDIC), the event brought together key stakeholders from civil society, businesses, universities, and policymakers to discuss steps for sectoral development. This event led to the establishment of the FEP-Games - Project Structuring Fund, created by the National Bank for Economic and Social Development (BNDES), to conduct the first large-scale study mapping the global and Brazilian industry and proposing public policies for the sector. The report was launched in 2014, including the 1st Census of the Brazilian Digital Games Industry.

In 2012, the first edition of the Brazilian Independent Games Festival (BIG Festival) took place, becoming the main business arena and a platform for interaction between the industry and the government, with the periodic establishment of a Working Group to discuss sectoral actions. In 2013, the sector gained its own game export program in partnership with the ApexBrasil, and since then, it has been conducting activities at various international events. The BGD - Brazilian Game Developers program, later renamed Brazil Games, became the main gateway for domestic companies to enter the export market.

For foreign video game console manufacturers, the Brazilian government's protectionist policies play a major role in consumer preferences in the country. An example of this was seen in 2013, when negative reactions followed the announcement of the price of Sony's then-upcoming PlayStation 4 being roughly being $1,845 in Brazil compared to $400 in the United States, which was a result of Brazil's heavy taxes and import fees on foreign electronics. By contrast, rival Xbox One was sold at just over $1,000 in Brazil due to its manufacturer, Microsoft, having a factory to produce it in the country.

Notable titles: Knights of Pen and Paper +1 Edition (Behold, 2013); Dungeonland (Critical Studio, 2013); Oniken (JoyMasher, 2014); Toren (Swordtales, 2015); Starlit Adventures (Rockhead, 2015); Momodora: Reverie Under The Moonlight (Bombservice, 2016); Horizon Chase (Aquiris, 2016).

=== 2018 to Present – Pandemic and Consolidation ===
In 2018, the Ministry of Culture conducted the 2nd Census of Digital Games, which indicated the sector's growth, with 375 companies participating in the survey. Additionally, in 2019, Wildlife received a $60 million investment led by the American venture capital fund Benchmark, making it a Brazilian "unicorn" valued at $1.3 billion. In the same year, the ARVORE studio, specialized in virtual reality, received the first Venice Lion at the Film Festival for a Brazilian production. Independent games Dandara and Celeste, the latter developed in partnership with an international studio, were among the top 10 games of the year in the ranking of the American magazine Time.

In the years 2020/2021, the COVID-19 pandemic brought various transformations to the game industry and market, with game consumption significantly increasing during this period. With this boost, in 2020, Wildlife was valued at $3 billion. Another change was the widespread adoption of remote work and the rise of companies that operate entirely remotely, such as Afterverse. The company is a spin-off of Play Kids (Movile Group), which reached 50 million monthly active users within a year with the game "PK XD," available in 11 languages and with a strong presence in Latin America, the United States, the Middle East, and Eastern Europe. PlayKids, which also develops games, provided the foundation for Afterverse's expansion.

In 2020, the ARVORE developer received the Extraordinary Innovation Primetime Emmy from the Academy of Television Arts and Sciences for an interactive short film. In 2021, Gazeus had the first Brazilian game distributed by Netflix. The year 2022 was marked by major acquisitions and international partnerships. Aquiris Studio received an investment from Epic Games, forming an agreement for the publication of multiple multi-platform games that have yet to be announced. London-based Oktagon was acquired by Fortis, a multinational game developer newly created as part of the Las Vegas Sands resorts and casinos group. The 100% remote studio Rogue Snail had its game Relic Hunters Rebels exclusively distributed by Netflix.

Notable titles: Dandara (Long Hat House, 2018), Celeste (Extremely OK Games/ MiniBoss, 2018), Wonderbox (Aquiris, 2021), PK XD (Afterverse, 2020), Suspects (Wildlife, 2020), and Relic Hunters Rebels (2021).

In 2023, the Brazilian developer Quasares Game Studio, based in Ribeirão Preto, presented at the Brasil Game Show event its historical game project Pedro of Brazil, one of the first national games to use the Unreal Engine 5 graphics engine from Epic Games.

== Censorship ==
In January 2008, the marketing of Counter-Strike was prohibited in Brazil by judicial decision. The judge argued that Counter-Strike and EverQuest games subvert social order.

It has since been lifted, although EverQuest is still illegal in physical form in Minas Gerais.

== Video game development ==
Video game development exists in Brazil since as early as 1983, when Renato Degiovani developed the first computer games in Portuguese called "Aventuras na Selva" (later renamed Amazônia) and "Aeroporto 83" (Airport 83) for a computer specialized magazine called "Micro Sistemas". Several years have passed with little to no significant development until the 2000s, when several companies started creating advergames and/or MMORPGs, and universities started offering game development degrees. Hoplon was one of the first to be successful in the industry with Taikodom.

The 2010s have been marked by a growing number of studios getting bigger relevance with proprietary indie game titles. The BIG Festival (Brazilian Independent Games Festival) was conceived in 2012 and is held every year in São Paulo, gathering game industry professionals from the country and abroad and promoting indie titles for the Brazilian market.

The biggest game dev scenes are from São Paulo, Porto Alegre and Brasília.

=== Localization ===
Video game localization is often critical to any video game's success in many parts of the world, and this is the case in Brazil. Despite beginning in the 1980s, the practice started to show immense success during the 1990s, which was seen in Tectoy's translations of some games into Brazilian Portuguese resulting in the Master System gaining a massive share of the video game console market in the country.

Demand for Brazilian Portuguese translations remains high for video games, as the language is the fourth highest language in-demand among developers according to LocalizeDirect. One of the biggest reasons for this is Latin America's above average growth in the global video game market, with Brazil being the largest singular player market in the region as of 2022.

=== Game developers from Brazil ===
Company	Location	Founded
1M Bits Horde	São Paulo	2020
Abdução	São Paulo	2003
Aoca Game Lab	Bahia	2016
Aquiris	Porto Alegre	2007
Asantee Games	Campo Grande	2012
Bad Minions (Also co-devs)	Brasília	2012
BEHEMUTT	Barueri	2015
Behold Studios	Brasília	2009
Coffeenauts	São Paulo	2017
Double Dash Studios	Rio de Janeiro	2013
Duaik Entretenimento	São Paulo	2009
Fira Soft (Also co-devs)	Brasília	2012
Flux Games (Also co-devs)	São Paulo	2012
Garage 227 Studios (Mainly co-devs)	São Paulo	2014
Glitch Factory	Brasília	2012
Hammer 95 Studios	Rio Grande do Sul	2023
Hoplon Infotainment	Florianópolis	2000
Infinite Hole	São Paulo	2017
Insolita Studios / Webcore Games	São Paulo	2004
Invent4 Entertainment	Porto Alegre	2008
JoyMasher	Curitiba	2012
Jynx Playware	Recife	2000
Loomiarts	São Leopoldo	2017
Ludact	São Paulo	2005
Mito Games (Also co-devs) (Ex-Enem Game)	Vitória	2016
Moonana (Ex-Nana Moon)	Curitiba	2017
MTI Studios	Botafogo	2011
Oktagon Games	Londrina	2004
Orbit Studio	São Paulo	2016
Pocket Trap	São Paulo	2013
Pulsatrix Studios	São Paulo	2018
QUARTZO Game Studio	Porto Alegre	2020
Quasares Game Studio	Ribeirão Preto	2019
Regular Studio	Brazil (Countryside)	2018
Reiza Studios	Maringá	2009
Rogue Snail	Brazil (Distributed)	2013
Rumbora Party Games	Bahia	2018
Sad Socket	São Paulo	2021
Skullfish Studios	São Paulo	2016
Smash Mountain Studio (Also co-devs)	Rio de Janeiro	2016
Studio Pixel Punk	São Paulo	2017
Sue The Real Studio	São Paulo	2018
Team Zeroth	Bahia	2014
Tectoy	Campinas	1987
Webcore Games (Also co-devs)	São Paulo	1999
Wondernaut Studio	Porto Alegre	2020
Yellow Panda Games	Balneário Camboriú	2017

Online-only Games
Company	Location	Founded
INSANE Game Studio	São Paulo	2009

Primarily Mobile/Casual Games
Company	Location	Founded
Afterverse Games	Campinas	2021
Fanatee	São Paulo	2013
Gazeus Games	Rio de Janeiro	2006
Izyplay Game Studio	Rio Grande do Sul	2010
Javary Studios	São Paulo	2018
Monomyto Studio (Also co-devs)	Campo Grande	2017
Pandora Game Studio	Rio de Janeiro	2012
Pipa Studios	São Paulo	2012
Pixodust Games	São Paulo	2018
Space Sheep Games	São Paulo	2020
Tapps Games	São Paulo	2011
Wildlife Studios	São Paulo	2011

Co-development Services
Company	Location	Founded
Aiyra	Niterói	2006
BitCake Studio	Rio de Janeiro	2013
Diorama Digital	Recife	2013
Kokku	Recife	2011
Lumen Games	Aracaju	2004
Manifesto Games	Recife	2005
PUGA Studios	Recife	2013
PushStart Studio	São Paulo	2014
Studio ZYX	São Paulo	2013
Umbu Games	Belo Horizonte	2015
VRMonkey	São Paulo	2013
Yupi Studios	João Pessoa	2015

Educational/Misc Games
Company	Location	Founded	Type
Eludica	São Paulo	2005	Game-based solutions for education, training and health
Flying Saci Game Studio	Manaus	2015	Edutainment, media projects, AR/VR apps
Gaz Games	Belo Horizonte	2011	development of games, digital marketing actions, applications, augmented reality, 3D modeling and animations

==== Defunct game developers ====
Company	Location	Founded	Defunct
Bitter Byte Games	São Paulo	2012	2014
Black River Studios (Also co-devs)	Manaus	2014	2021 (Inactive afterwards)
Continuum Entertainment	Curitiba	1998	2009
Cruel Byte (Also co-devs)	São Paulo	2015	2017 (Inactive afterwards)
Cupcake Entertainment	Porto Alegre	2012	2018 (Inactive afterwards)
Espaço Informática	Porto Alegre	1999	2010
Fire Horse Studio (Also co-devs)	São Paulo	2012	2019 (Inactive afterwards)
Ilusis Interactive Graphics	Belo Horizonte	2008	2016 (Inactive afterwards)
Luderia	Santa Maria	2012	2020
Messier Games & Animations (Also co-devs)	São Paulo	2014	2021 (Inactive afterwards)
O2 Games	Belo Horizonte	2005	2017 (Closed)
Perceptum Informática Ltda.	São Paulo	1998	2001 (Inactive afterwards)
Reload Game Studio	São Paulo	2013	2015 (Website went down)
Sinergia Studios (Also co-devs)	Ribeirão Preto	2014	2023 (Inactive afterwards)
Sunland Entertainment Studios	Belo Horizonte	2014	2021 (Closed)
Swordtales	Porto Alegre	2011	2021 (Inactive)
T4 Interactive	São Paulo	2016	2022 (Closed)

== Game publishers from Brazil ==
Company	Location	Founded	Type
Cledman Games	Juiz de Fora	2022	Publisher. Firm lead is also a dev.
Devcats Games	Flores da Cunha	2021	Publisher & dev
IndigoWare	Guarulhos	2015	Publisher & dev
Level Up Brasil	São Paulo	2004	Distributor
Mad Mimic Interactive	São Paulo	2017	Publisher & dev
Minicactus Games	Lauro de Freitas	2020	Publisher & dev
Pixel Game Studio	São Bernardo do Campo	2016	Publisher & dev
QUByte Interactive	São Paulo	2009	Developer, Porting & Publishing
Venn Studios	São Paulo	2023	Publisher & dev
Virtual Arts Studio	Brazil	2020	Publisher & dev

=== Defunct game publishers from Brazil ===
Company	Location	Founded	Defunct	Notes
Brasoft Produtos de Informática Ltda. (PT wiki)	São Paulo	1984	2004	Software firm. Game business: Publisher, distribution, localization. First published game in 1990. Sold in 1998 to Pi Editora Ltda. Name & logo ceased in 2003.
Byte & Brothers	Brazil	1996	2001	Publisher & developer. Website inactive after 2001 (Mar 2, 2001).
NC Games & Entertainment	Barueri	1994	2017	Inactive afterwards
Pi Editora Ltda.	São Caetano do Sul	1998	2003	Publisher, distribution, localization. Also used the Brasoft brand.

== Media ==
Print Media

- EGM Brasil, since 2002
- Nintendo World, since 1998
- Revista Xbox 360, since 2008

== Brazilian video game rating ==
The ClassInd (advisory rating) is the institute responsible for the software given for review on Brazil.

== See also ==
- Jogo Justo, an initiative to have tariffs on video games lowered
- Latin American communities and video games
