= Marcano =

Marcano is a surname of Spanish origin. The Italian version of this surname is "Marciano". It was a military family that came to the New World with Christopher Columbus. The Family later grew and spread throughout the Caribbean, where the surname became rooted in the countries of Dominican Republic, Puerto Rico, Cuba and Venezuela (Margarita Island) and eventually Trinidad & Tobago.

== People ==
Notable people with the surname include:

- Alfredo Marcano (1947–2009), Venezuelan boxer
- Arturo J. Marcano Guevara, Venezuelan sports author and activist
- Bobby Marcano (1951–1990), Venezuelan baseball player
- César Marcano (born 1987), Venezuelan cyclist
- Cristina Marcano (born 1960), Venezuelan biographer of Hugo Chávez
- Danielle Marcano (born 1997), Puerto Rican footballer
- Elias Marcano (born 1971), Venezuelan wrestler
- Héctor Marcano (born 1956), Puerto Rican television producer, host, actor and comedian
- Gustavo Marcano (born 1979), Venezuelan lawyer and politician
- Iván Marcano (born 1987), Spanish footballer
- Jason Marcano (1983–2019), Trinidad and Tobago footballer
- Javier López Marcano (1955–2026), Spanish politician
- Jesús Marcano Moya (born 1980), Venezuelan engineer and hacker
- José Rafael Marcano, Venezuelan engineer and videogame programmer
- Karen Marcano (born 1979), Venezuelan bowler
- Liz Yeraldine Marcano Cabeza (born 1992), Venezuelan karateka
- Luis Marcano (1831–1870), Dominican general
- María Marcano de León, Puerto Rican government official
- Neville Marcano (1916–1993), Trinidad and Tobago musician and boxer
- Noé Marcano (born 1980), Puerto Rican politician
- Pablo Marcano García (born 1952), Puerto Rican artist
- Ray Marcano, American journalist, music critic and editor
- Soraya Marcano (born 1965), American artist
- Tucupita Marcano (born 1999), Venezuelan baseball player
- Zuray Marcano (1954–2020), Venezuelan Paralympic powerlifter and educator
- Luis Manuel Marcano (1966-) Académico, Escritor y Magistrado del TSJ legítimo.
