= Video games in Lithuania =

A number of video game companies are based in Lithuania.

== Support ==
In early December 2024, the Lithuanian government officially launched the first video game accelerator program in the country called GameTech, in partnership with organisations, 'Startup Lithuania' and Spanish-based 'GameBCN'. It aimed to support local studios in the video game industry to scale up internationally, and attract international talent and investment. The first edition of this accelerator hosted 11 teams in the process of building their games.

== Game companies from Lithuania ==
=== Game developers ===
- All Parts Connected (Former publisher)
- Button Mash, MB
- Estoty
- Glera Games
- Hidden Layer Games, UAB
- Jollybits Games MB
- Karaclan
- Kiork
- Kodo Linija
- Lazy Bear Games (Former location in St. Petersburg.)
- Tag of Joy
- Tiny Magicians

==== Misc ====
- Belka Games LT, UAB (CY HQ. Mobile games.)
- Moon Active Lithuania, UAB (IL HQ. Mobile & social games. Ex-Melsoft Games (2007-2020).)
- On5 Games (Mobile)
- TutoTOONS (Mobile edu-games)

==== Co-development ====
- Fluxo Games (Co-dev, art, porting. Also publisher & dev.)
- Melior Games Lithuania, UAB (UA founded; LT HQ. Outsource.)
- Nieko, MB (HQ. VR/AR, 3D/2D art. Also publisher & dev.)
- SneakyBox

=== Game publishers ===
==== Publisher and development firms ====
- Explosive Squat Games
- Flazm
- Game Insight (Mobile & online)
- Lazy Flock
- No Brakes Games
- Nordcurrent (Casual. Setup by Ivolgamus founders.)
- V3663L (Ex-Zuurix in 2013-2019, Small Moons in 2020-2023)
- Vidas Games
- Wargaming Vilnius, UAB (Belarusian firm. Mainly online sims.)

=== Defunct game companies ===
- A-Steroids (Founded 2008. Inactive 2017. Mobile games.)
- Akelotė ir Ko, Ltd. (Founded 1997. Inactive in 2007. Publisher, distributor, localizer. Mobile phone, video games, movies, edutainment retailer.)
- Ivolgamus UAB (Founded 2002. Inactive after 2012. Website down 2014. Publisher & dev.)
- Pixel Punch, UAB (Founded 2011. Closed 2016. Co-dev, dev: Games, AR, apps, multimedia.)
- Real Welders (Founded 2017. Defunct 2025. Publisher & dev.)
- Realore (Founded 2002. Defunct 2018. Dev & former publisher: casual games.)
- Wireframe Dreams (Founded 2003. Inactive after 2006. Website down after 2008.)

== Titles from Lithuania ==
- 101-in-1 Sports Party Megamix
- Barbie as the Island Princess
- Cooking Fever
- Falling Stars
- FateLords
- Human: Fall Flat
- Inmost
- Johnny Trigger
- Murder In The Alps: Hidden Mystery
- PSI: Syberian Conflict
- RollerCoaster Tycoon 4 Mobile
- The Howler
- Vampire Rush
- VED
