= Video games in Bangladesh =

The video gaming industry in Bangladesh is relatively new, with most early developments occurring independently since 2002. While independent developers laid the foundation, commercial video game production began gaining momentum around 2014 as IT companies entered the field. In recent years, universities across the country have also conducted research aimed at improving the sector.

== History ==
Video games were introduced to the country through arcade gaming, which gained popularity during the late 1990s, fueled by the growing affordability of personal computers. However, local game development didn’t begin until the early 2000s. One of the earliest and most notable titles was Dhaka Racing, a 3D racing game set in the streets of the capital Dhaka. It was developed by two computer science undergraduates from North South University and independently published by eSophers in 2002. The game received an overwhelmingly positive response, helping to spark interest in local game development.

Inspired by Dhaka Racing's success, two final-year students from Chittagong University of Engineering and Technology (CUET), Ahmed Shamsul Arefin and Samiran Mahmud, developed Chittagong Racing in 2003, further boosting momentum in the emerging scene.

In 2004, Bangladesh saw the release of its first locally developed first-person shooter, Arunodoyer Agnishikha, developed by Trimatrik Interactive and published by SHOM Computers Ltd. The game was set during the Bangladesh Liberation War and featured major battles from Chittagong, Rajshahi and Akhaura. It included three gameplay modes, Battlefield, The Team and Time Limit, with Battlefield serving as the primary experience where the player has to choose one from four different battlefields of the war. The game received critical acclaim and marked a milestone in the country's game development history.

In 2012, a team of BRAC University students developed Aerial Multi-Player Dogfight, which they claimed was the world’s first PC-based massively multi-player online (MMO) game responsive to both body movements and voice commands.

Later that year, on 16 December 2012, Team 71, the first professional game development team in the country since 2004, was formed. Their debut project, Liberation 71, a first-person shooter inspired by Arunodoyer Agnishikha and based on real events from the Liberation War, was announced with high ambition. Built on Unreal Engine 4, the game remains under development. Team 71 has since been regarded as a pioneer of modern game development in Bangladesh.

In 2014, MassiveStar Studio developed and released Hatirjheel: Dream Begins, an open-world action-adventure title. It was the first commercially published game in the country.

By 2015, LAI MASSIVE, a small, youthful team, began developing The Reels: Welcome to Bangladesh, a linear, story-driven racing game that takes players on a journey from Dhaka to Chittagong. They also produced other titles such as The Division SA: World at War, The Run, and Night Time Bed.

In June 2016, Dream World Studio released Durjoy, a third-person shooter, and later began work on Hound6: The Escape, a sequel to the first-person shooter Hound6: Strike that had released earlier that year.

On December 25, 2015, Mindfisher Games released Heroes of 71, another FPS inspired by the Liberation War. Its sequel, Heroes of 71: Retaliation, was released on March 25, 2016. Together, the games amassed over one million downloads on the Google Play Store. A third installment, titled Mukti Camp, was released on December 15, 2017.

In August 12th 2020, Zero Hour, a tactical first-person shooter developed by AttritoM7 Productions, was launched on Steam in Early Access, and left Early Access in September 9, 2024. It became the first Bangladeshi game to be released on the platform. Set in modern-day Dhaka (fictionalized as Dhacca), the game pits two teams of five players, attackers and defenders, against each other. Attackers must use strategy and coordination to plant a bomb in the enemy base, while defenders deploy traps and fortifications to stop them. Zero Hour is notable for being the first Bangladeshi game to feature motion capture and procedural prop placements.

== Research and development ==
There has been some research and development carried out on video games since the past decade. In 2014, Microsoft Bangladesh organized a game development workshop called Imagine Cup Bangladesh 2014 - Game Camp for the participants of the games category of the Imagine Cup Bangladesh 2014. It was followed by two other game camps. In the same year, MassiveStar Studio began a project to train 80,000 students as video game developers.
