= Westfield Mount Druitt =

- Location: Mount Druitt, Sydney, New South Wales, Australia
- Coordinates: 33°45′59″S 150°49′09″E
- Address: Carlisle Avenue, Mount Druitt NSW 2770
- Opened: 1973
- Developer: Westfield Group
- Owner: Scentre Group (50%); Dexus Wholesale Shopping Centre Fund (50%)
- Num. of stores: Approx. 240
- Floors: 2
- Parking: Approx. 2,330 spaces
- Public transit: Mount Druitt Railway Station
- Website: www.westfield.com.au/mtdruitt

Westfield Mount Druitt (officially styled as Westfield Mt Druitt) is a major regional shopping centre located in the suburb of Mount Druitt in Greater Western Sydney, New South Wales, Australia. The centre is jointly owned by Scentre Group and Dexus, and is managed by Scentre Group.

Serving as a primary retail and social hub for the City of Blacktown and the surrounding Outer Western Sydney region, the centre features over 240 specialty stores anchored by major discount department stores, supermarkets, an entertainment complex, and a dedicated rooftop dining precinct.

== History ==
The development of Westfield Mount Druitt was closely tied to the urban expansion of Western Sydney during the late 1960s and early 1970s. The site was chosen as part of the new master-planned town centre for Mount Druitt to accommodate rapid residential population growth in the surrounding area.

The centre officially opened in 1973 under the development of the Westfield Group. Over the decades, the facility underwent multiple expansion phases to keep pace with changing retail demands and demographic growth in the local area.

In 2014, following a corporate restructuring of the Westfield Group, ownership and operational management of the centre transferred to the newly formed Scentre Group.

=== 2022 redevelopment ===
In March 2022, a major A$55 million redevelopment of Westfield Mount Druitt was completed. The centerpiece of the upgrade was the introduction of a new 16,000-square-metre rooftop dining and entertainment precinct featuring outdoor dining outlets, dynamic leisure space, and a large-scale Timezone family entertainment center with bumper cars, bowling lanes, and arcade games.

== Retailers and Facilities ==
Westfield Mount Druitt covers approximately 65,381 square metres of total gross lettable area (GLA) across two primary retail levels.

Major anchor retailers and key tenants at the centre include:

- Supermarkets: Coles and Woolworths
- Discount Department Stores: Kmart and Target
- Electronics & Variety: JB Hi-Fi and Best & Less
- Sporting Goods: Rebel
- Entertainment: Hoyts cinema complex featuring recliner auditoriums and Timezone

The rooftop precinct features a wide selection of quick-service and full-service indoor and outdoor dining venues.

== Transport and Access ==
The centre functions as a central transport node for the local area:

- Rail: Mount Druitt railway station is located within short walking distance, providing direct passenger rail connection via the T1 North Shore & Western Line of the Sydney Trains network.
- Bus: An adjacent major bus interchange provides regular connections operated by Busways and other local transport providers across Western Sydney.
- Parking: The centre provides approximately 2,330 multi-deck and open parking spaces with direct vehicular access from Carlisle Avenue and surrounding feeder roads.

== See also ==
- Scentre Group
- Mount Druitt, New South Wales
- List of shopping centres in Australia
