= RealXtend =

Virtual world platform project

realXtend Tundra SDK
- Developer: realXtend Association
- Stable release: 2.5.2 / January 30, 2014; 12 years ago
- Operating system: Windows, OS X
- Type: Virtual environment software
- License: Apache
- Website: realxtend.org
- Repository: github.com/realXtend/tundra

realXtend is a project for creating an open-source virtual world platform which is intended to extend the capabilities of OpenSimulator to include features which are not available in the original Second Life project.

Like OpenSim, with which the project collaborates and from which it derives much of its code, realXtend is intended to allow individuals and groups to set up and browse their own virtual worlds without having to be connected to much larger worlds like Second Life.

== Operations ==
It is created by the realXtend Association, which was founded in April 2011, and is funded by both realXtend Foundation and Oulu Innovation of Oulu, Finland, as a cooperation by three Oulu based companies Evocativi, LudoCraft and Playsign.

== Viewer ==
Initially, in early 2008, realXtend published a custom viewer derived from Linden Labs's own SL viewer; a free, open-source client (or viewer) software application for Microsoft Windows which allows for viewing and accessing both Second Life and multiple OpenSimulator-based virtual world grids, the realXtend viewer is licensed under the GNU GPL.

The realXtend viewer uses the OGRE engine, and it provides real-time shadows, improved lighting simulation, meshes and realistic avatars. The official Second Life physics engine is the proprietary Havok engine. The viewer connects to the OpenSim codebase trunk via the separate ModRex utility.

=== Future ===
Beginning in 2009, the project began to work on a newer, original viewer, codenamed Naali, which is licensed under the BSD license and coded to implement a more robust viewing architecture. The new viewer and its SDK are now known as Tundra. It makes use of OpenSim's contributions policy, and, like Taiga, is relicensed under the Apache License v2.

== Server ==
Taiga, first released in 2009, is a server software suite derived from the ScienceSim project (backed in part by Intel), which is itself derived from OpenSim's server project. Unlike OpenSim, Taiga packages and integrates the ModRex and ModCableBeach utilities (the latter of which provides access to the ROBUST inventory, assets grid services, implements an webdav inventory/avatars and OpenID authentication).
