= 101-in-1 Explosive Megamix =

2008 video game

- DS box art
- Developer: Nordcurrent
- Publishers: NA: Atlus; EU: Nordcurrent
- Platforms: Nintendo DS, WiiWare
- Release: Nintendo DS: EU: November 28, 2008; NA: April 21, 2009; WiiWare: EU: September 22, 2011; NA: October 13, 2011
- Genre: Video game compilation
- Modes: Single-player, multiplayer

101-in-1 Explosive Megamix is a video game developed by Nordcurrent and published by Atlus for the Nintendo DS. It was released in Europe on November 28, 2008 and on April 21, 2009 in North America and features 10 hours' worth of 101 minigames. A version for the WiiWare service was released on September 22, 2011 in Europe and on October 13 in North America.

The Nintendo DS version received mixed to negative reviews, while the WiiWare version received heavily negative reviews, with most criticism directed towards the repetitive minigames, music and the controls.

== Gameplay ==
Players can use the stylus, D-Pad and touch screen or Wii Remote to test their reflexes in action minigames like racing and skydiving, take on sporting events such as basketball, curling, and archery, strategize with tank and space combat games, or play match three, Sudoku, and jigsaw puzzles. Gamers who set high scores earn gold coins that can be used to unlock other activities, and those looking for multiplayer action take on friends in multi-card wireless play. Each minigame requires scores ranging from 4000-200000 to beat the minigame for a one-time bonus. When players start, there are only 10 games unlocked (Basketball, Tornado Hockey, Circus, Bouncer/Foot and the Ball, Sushi, Curlers, Sky Hunter, Darts, Card Castle (Dirty Gold in the WiiWare version) and Aquarium), and the 91 other minigames must be unlocked, with later minigames requiring a higher price.

== Development ==
In 2009, Atlus U.S.A., Inc. secured the North American publishing rights from Nordcurrent for 101-in-1 Explosive Megamix for Nintendo DS. Players could challenge a friend to multiplayer competition through local wireless play. It was scheduled for release on April 21 for a price of US$19.99.

== Reception ==
Reception

Aggregate scores
Aggregator	Score
GameRankings	54% (DS); 17% (Wii)
Metacritic	46/100 (DS); 16/100 (Wii)

Review scores
Publication	Score
Eurogamer	4/10 (DS)
GameRevolution	1/10 (DS)
IGN	2.5/10 (Wii)
Nintendo Life	3/10 (Wii)
Nintendo World Report	3/10 (DS)
Official Nintendo Magazine	14% (Wii)

The Nintendo DS version of 101-in-1 Explosive Megamix received mixed to negative reviews. Lukasz Balicki of Nintendo World Report game the game a 3/10 and commented "101-in-1 Explosive Megamix is the definitive bad budget title. Some of the mini-games are remotely fun, but others feel like a chore. With so many poor and forgettable games on the compilation, it's hard to recommend this one". Dan Pearson of Eurogamer gave the game a 4/10 and stated "There is so little replay potential here, so little urge to top high scores or perfect shoddy make-do attempts, that completing each task feels more of a relief than an achievement.". Nicholas Tan of Game Revolution called each minigame "low-production, tinny-sounding and uninspiring" and gave them scores ranging from C to F, except for Tooth Decay/Halitosis of Horrors, which received an F− and commented "You're better off putting on a blindfold, walking into a rack of DS titles, and picking the game that your face lands on". However, he praised the good variety of minigames.

The WiiWare version received negative reviews. Lucas M. Thomas of IGN gave the game a "painful" 2.5 and commented "[...] So keep your cash held back from this 'value' option. It's a waste of money no matter how the math works out." Additionally, Thomas criticized the game for being a direct port from the DS and the iPhone. Thomas East of Official Nintendo Magazine UK gave the game a 14% and concluded "Indeed, it's so difficult that you'll find it tough to unlock all 101 games. Not that you'd want to bother because they're so abysmal, not even of the standard of your average Flash game". Review aggregator Metacritic gave the game 16/100 based on 5 reviews, and is the lowest-rated Wii game on the website. Game Revolution gave the game a "1/10". GamesRadar+ gave the game a 4/10. Peter Willington of Nintendo Life said that none of the games in the compilation were fun to play and gave the game 3 out of 10 stars.
