= 101-in-1 Sports Party Megamix =

2010 video game

- European cover art from the Wii version
- Developer: Nordcurrent
- Publishers: EU: Nordcurrent; NA: Atlus; JP: Starfish-SD
- Platforms: Wii, Nintendo DS
- Release: 2010
- Genre: Sports
- Modes: Single-player; Multiplayer

101-in-1 Sports Party Megamix is a video game developed by Nordcurrent and published by Atlus for the Wii and Nintendo DS.

== Gameplay ==
Players move the Wii Remote in games such as bowling, motocross, and racing. On the DS version, you instead tap or drag the stylus on the screen. On the Wii version, two to four players can compete against each other in a sack race, tennis, and skateboarding. Gamers who set high scores (which are indicated in the game) can unlock other games to play.

== Reception ==
Upon release, Sports Party Megamix earned mostly negative reviews. Metacritic gave the game a 41/100 based on 7 reviews. The game was also criticized for sloppy graphics, and unresponsive controls.
