= Taito =

Japanese video game company and arcade operator

Taito Corporation
- Logo used since 1988

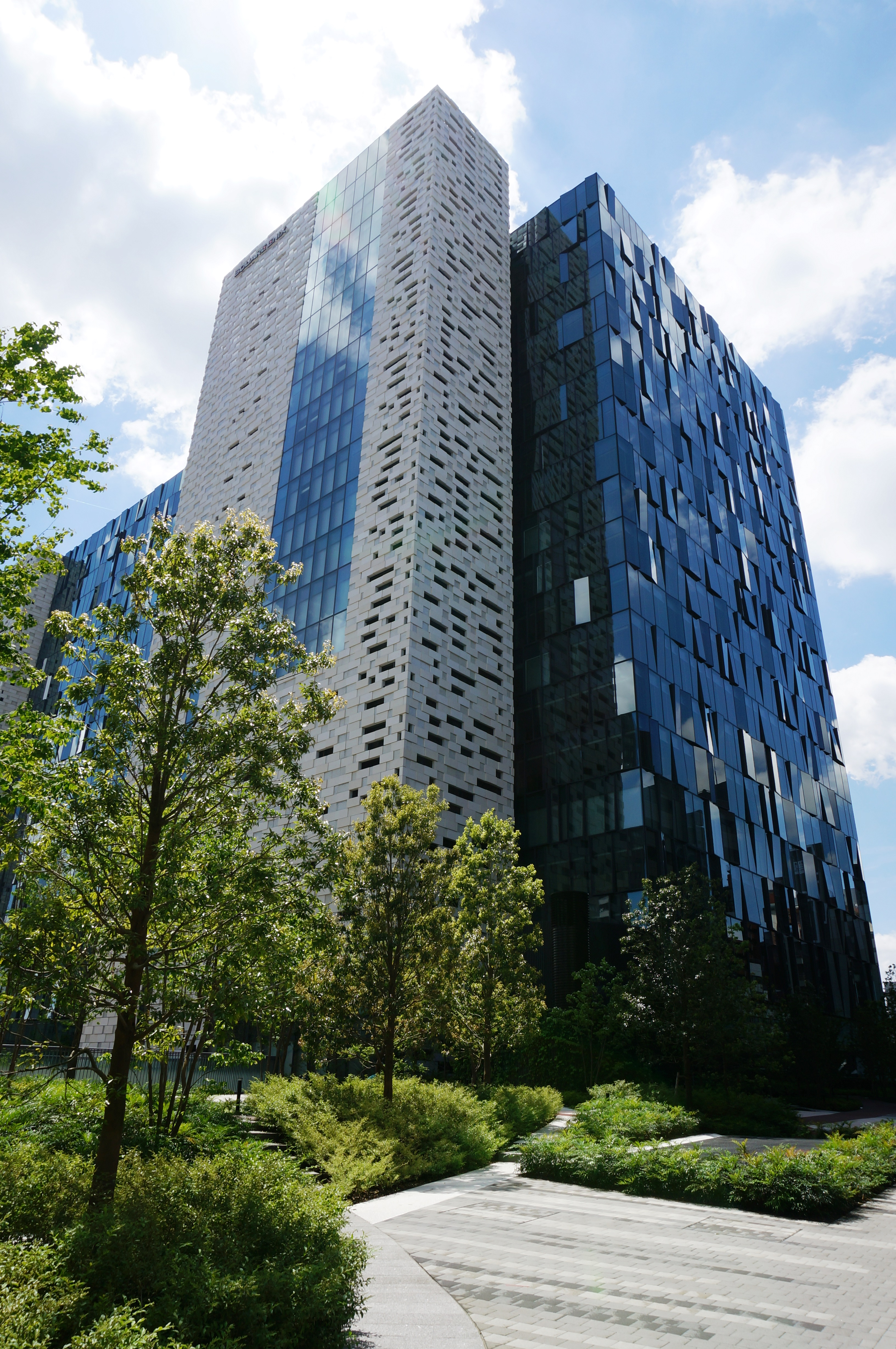
- Taito shares its headquarters building (in Shinjuku) with its parent company, Square Enix.
- Native name: 株式会社タイトー
- Romanized name: Kabushikigaisha Taitō
- Formerly: Taito Trading Company (1953–1972)
- Type: Subsidiary
- Industry: Video games Arcades; Toys
- Founded: August 24, 1953; 73 years ago (Note: Current company established in June 2009.)
- Founder: Michael Kogan
- Headquarters: Shinjuku, Shinjuku, Tokyo, Japan
- Key people: Katsuhiko Iwaki; (president); Tetsu Yamada; (chairman); Yukio Iizawa; (honorary chairman)
- Products: Video games; Arcade systems; Mobile games; Toys
- Revenue: $412 million (¥62.4 billion) (2024)
- Total equity: ▲¥45.70 billion
- Number of employees: 752 (March 2020)
- Parent: Square Enix (2005–present)
- Subsidiaries: Taito Game Rental; Taitotech
- Website: www.taito.co.jp
- Footnotes "Taito Corporation Company Profile 2019" (PDF) (in Japanese). Taito. 2019. Archived from the original (PDF) on May 15, 2020.

Taito Corporation (Note: Japanese: 株式会社タイトー, Hepburn: Kabushiki gaisha Taitō) is a Japanese video game and entertainment company based in Shinjuku, Tokyo. It specializes in video games, toys, and amusement arcades. The company was founded by Ukrainian businessman Michael Kogan in 1953 as the Taito Trading Company, (Note: Japanese: 太東貿易株式会社, Hepburn: Taitō Bōeki Kabushiki gaisha) importing vodka, vending machines, and jukeboxes into Japan. It began production of video games in 1973. In 2005, Taito was purchased by Square Enix.

Taito is recognized as an important industry influencer in the early days of video games, producing a number of hit arcade games such as Speed Race (1974), Western Gun (1975), Space Invaders (1978), Bubble Bobble (1986), and Arkanoid (1986). It is one of the most prominent video game companies from Japan and the first that exported its games to other countries. Several of its games have since been recognized as important and revolutionary for the industry – Space Invaders in particular was a major contributor to the growth of video games in the late 1970s, and the aliens featured in the games are seen as iconic emblems within the video game industry.

The company maintains a chain of arcade centers, known as "Taito Game Stations", across Japan, alongside being a manufacturer of toys, plush dolls and UFO-catcher prizes.

== History ==
In 1944, Jewish Ukrainian businessman Michael Kogan founded Taitung in Shanghai. Kogan, a refugee of the Soviet Union, had previously worked in a factory in Japan during the country's involvement in World War II before moving to Shanghai to join his father. The company's name, written in Kanji as 太東, is composed of the Pacific Ocean (太平洋) and the Far East (極東).

=== 1950s–1960s ===
The Communist takeover of China prompted Kogan to liquidate the business in 1950 and move operations to Japan, which had been suffering a significant economic decline after the war. The second business that he started there, a clothing distributor named Taito Yoko, struggled financially as a result of employee carelessness and constant loss of products. On August 24, 1953, Taito Yoko was abolished and replaced by the Taito Trading Company, where Kogan was joined by lawyer and retired newspaperman Akio Nakatani. Taito Trading Company began as a vodka distillery—the first company to produce vodka in Japan—and an importer of peanut vending machines and perfume machines.

Increasing competition led to Taito abandoning the vodka business in 1955 and focusing on its successful vending machines, in addition to importing jukeboxes. As Taito lacked a proper license to import jukeboxes into Japan, it purchased broken-down machines from United States military bases and refurbished them with working parts from defective units. The recovering Japanese economy allowed Taito to become the official distributor of AMI jukeboxes in the country. Though the deal had little impact at first, over 1,500 machines were sold by 1960 when the company began mixing Japanese records with American folk songs. A partnership with the Seeburg Corporation made Taito its exclusive agent in Japan and one of the nation's leading jukebox companies.

Taito began manufacturing electro-mechanical games (EM games) in the 1960s. In 1967, they released Crown Soccer Special (1967), a two-player sports game that simulated association football using electronic components such as pinball flippers. In 1968, Crown Basketball debuted in the US as the highest-earning arcade game at the 1968 Tampa Fair.

=== 1970s–1980s ===
Taito changed its name from Taito Trading Company to Taito Corporation in August 1972. It established its American subsidiary in 1973 in downtown Chicago, Taito America, which would later develop games of its own such as Qix.

==== First video game ====
Taito's first video game was called Elepong. It is a ping-pong arcade cabinet released in 1973 in Japan.

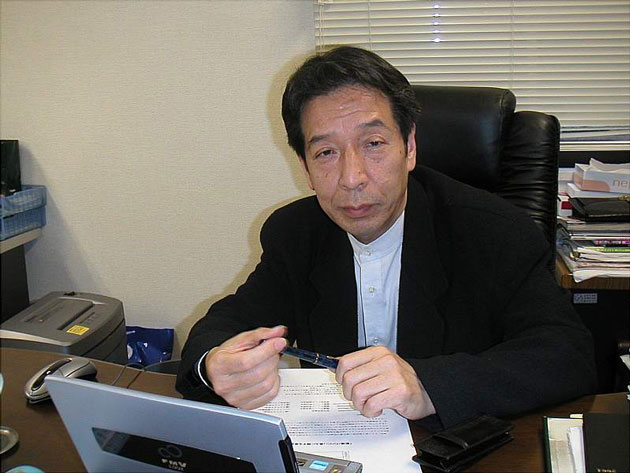
Tomohiro Nishikado in 2011

Tomohiro Nishikado, a Tokyo Denki University engineering graduate who joined the company in 1968, was instrumental in the company's transition to video games. After developing the hit electro-mechanical target shooting games Sky Fighter (1971) and Sky Fighter II, his bosses at Taito believed transistor-transistor logic (TTL) technology would play a significant role in the arcade industry, so they tasked Nishikado with investigating TTL technology as he was the company's only employee who knew how to work with integrated circuit (IC) technology, and one of the few engineers at any Japanese coin-op company with significant expertise in solid-state electronics.

Nishikado spent six months dissecting Atari's Pong arcade unit and learning how the game's IC chips worked, and began modifying the game. This led to his development of the Pong-style sports video games Soccer and Davis Cup for Taito, with Soccer developed first but both released in November 1973. He then developed several original arcade video game hits for Taito, notably the sports game TV Basketball (1974), the racing game Speed Race (1974), and the shooter game Western Gun (1975); these three titles were localized by Midway Manufacturing in North America as TV Basketball, Wheels, and Gun Fight, respectively.

In 1978, Nishikado created Space Invaders, which became the company's most popular title and the most popular game in arcade history, responsible for beginning the golden age of arcade video games. After Michael Kogan died in February 1984, his son, Abraham "Abba" Kogan, became Taito's chairman and Akio Nakanishi became its president.

Taito's former logo

In April 1986 and barely a month after becoming part of the Kyocera group, Taito merged with two of its subsidiaries, Pacific Industrial Co., Ltd. and the Japan Vending Machine Co., Ltd, and absorbed them both. Japan Vending Machine was once an independent company but was purchased by Taito in July 1971 to strengthen its presence in the operation of amusement facilities. Pacific Industrial was created by Taito itself in 1963 to develop products for the company.

=== 1990s–2000s ===
In 1992, Taito announced a CD-ROM-based video game console named WOWOW, that would have allowed people to play near-exact ports of Taito's arcades (similar to the Neo Geo), as well as download games from a satellite transmission (as the Satellaview would do later). It was named after the Japanese television station WOWOW and would have utilized its stations to download games. The WOWOW was never released.

Taito America ceased operations in July 1996 after more than 20 years of existence. Taito had already sold exclusive rights for publishing its games in America to Acclaim Entertainment the previous year. Similarly, a division existed in London, England, United Kingdom to distribute Taito games in Europe. Taito (Europe) Corporation Limited was created in 1988 and liquidated in February 1998.

When Taito was owned by Kyocera, its headquarters were in Hirakawachō, Chiyoda. In October 2000, Taito merged with Kyocera Multimedia Corporation to enter the market of mobile phones for the first time.

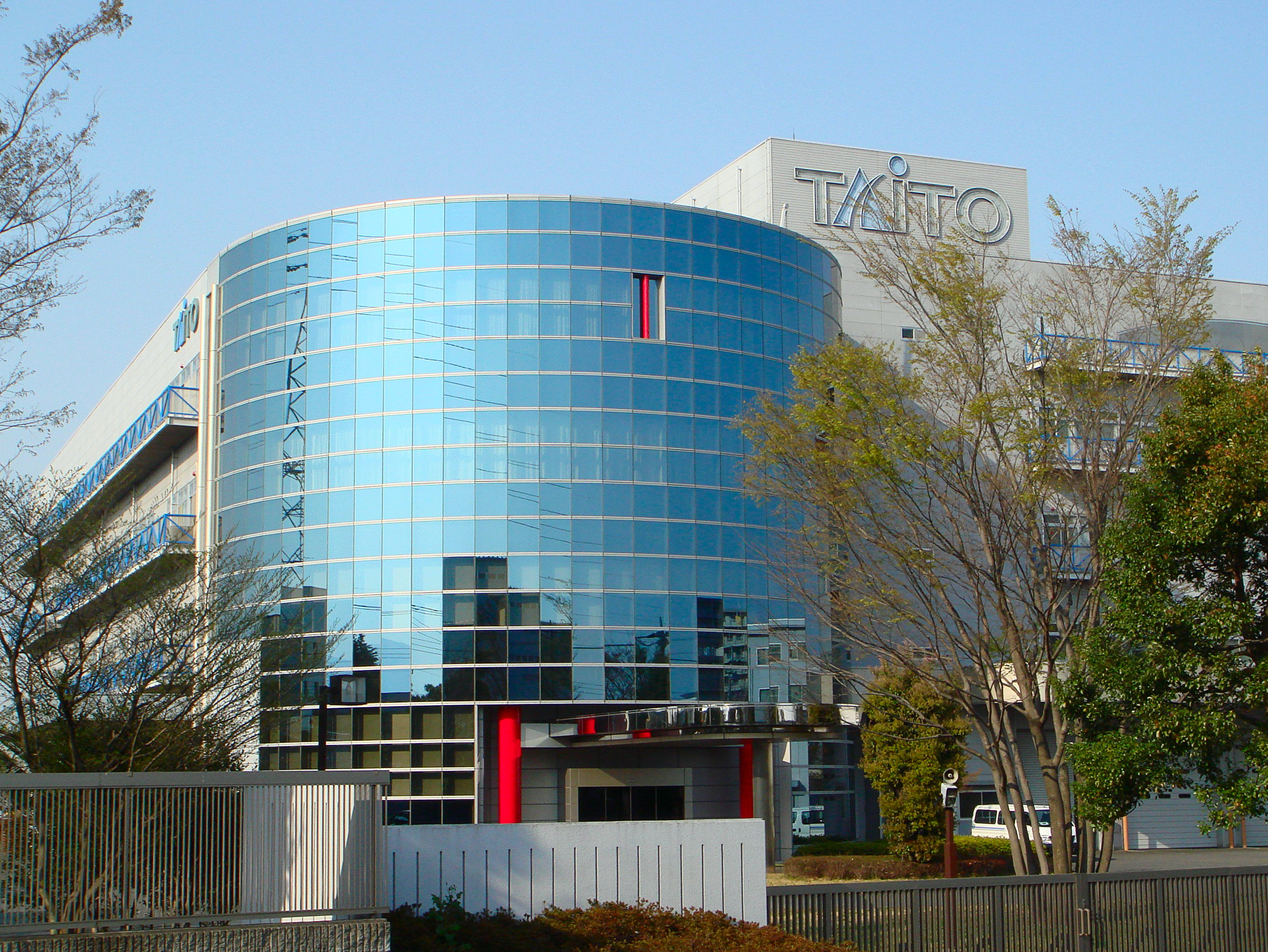
Taito Ebina Development Center in Ebina, Kanagawa Prefecture. Opened in 1979, it closed in 2014.

In August 2005, it was announced that the gaming conglomerate Square Enix would purchase 247,900 Taito shares worth ¥45.16 billion (US$409.1 million), to make Taito Corporation a subsidiary of Square Enix. The purpose of the takeover by Square Enix was to both increase Taito's profit margin as well as begin its company's expansion into new forms of gaming, most notably, the arcade scene, and various other entertainment venues. The takeover bid from Square Enix was accepted by previous stockholder Kyocera, making Taito a Square Enix subsidiary.

On September 22, 2005, Square Enix announced successfully acquiring 93.7% of all shares of Taito, effectively owning the company by September 28, 2005. In March 2006, Square Enix wanted to make Taito a wholly owned subsidiary. To accomplish this goal, Square Enix merged Taito into SQEX Corporation. Although the combined company took on the name "Taito Corporation", it was actually Taito that was dissolved and SQEX that was the surviving entity. Taito became a subsidiary wholly owned by Square Enix and was delisted from the First Section of the Tokyo Stock Exchange.

In July 2008, Square Enix announced that it would liquidate two subsidiaries of Taito, Taito Art Corporation (an insurance and travel agent subsidiary) and Taito Tech Co., Ltd. (an amusement and maintenance subsidiary) on the grounds that both had fulfilled their business purpose. The process ended in October 2008.

=== 2010s–present ===
Square Enix Holdings wanted all of its arcade operations to be regrouped into one subsidiary. And so, the present Taito Corporation came to being on February 1, 2010, by merging Taito with ES1 Corporation. In an "absorption-type company split" move, the second Taito company (formerly SQEX) was split and renamed Taito Soft Corporation, while ES1 Corporation became the third Taito Corporation. During the merger that made it the new Taito Corporation, ES1 inherited all of Taito's arcade and mobile businesses, and nearly the totality of its employees. On the other hand, Taito Soft Corporation was left with 10 employees to concentrate exclusively on the development and publishing of Taito video games for home consoles. Taito's home video game business was eventually folded into Square Enix on March 11, 2010. ES1 Corporation was established as an operator of arcade facilities and owned by the shell company SPC1, itself a wholly owned subsidiary of Square Enix Holdings. SCP1 dissolved when ES1 became Taito Corporation in February 2010. As such, the current Taito Corporation is technically the company formerly called ES1 Corporation founded on June 1, 2009.

On November 30, 2016, Taito announced that it will distribute Space Invaders and Arkanoid for Facebook with Instant Games on Facebook Messenger and Facebook News Feed.

On July 3, 2018, Taito announced in Famitsu that it will return to the software publishing business for the eighth generation of video game consoles. The intention to return to the home console market came about because the company decided that it would be necessary to release Taito's intellectual properties on current platforms in order to increase profit. The company has various properties planned in its software pipeline, from re-releases to new titles for various platforms; however, Taito highlighted that the console software market is a challenging business for the company. Taito intends to develop original games for consoles in the future.

On March 2, 2022, Taito launched a mini arcade cabinet named the Egret II Mini, which is based on the Egret II cabinet used widely in Taito games in the 1990s. It includes a number of Taito games, with additional games being released through SD cards.

== Organization ==
Taito had branches outside of Japan in Brazil (Taito of Brazil), Belgium, Australia, and the US.
