= Gameframe =

Hybrid computer system

A Gameframe is a hybrid computer system that was first used in the online video game industry. It is a combination of the technologies and architectures for supercomputers and mainframes, namely high computing power and high throughput.

== History ==
In 2007, Hoplon and IBM jointly started the gameframe project, in which they used an IBM System z mainframe computer with attached Cell/B.E. blades (the eight-core parallel-processing chips that power Sony's PlayStation 3) to host their online game Taikodom. The project was carried further by a co-operation between IBM and the University of California, San Diego in 2009.

In the Gameframe design, the System z mainframe handled security, administrative tasks and connections to a large number of clients. The most computationally intensive work was offloaded to Cell/B.E. processors on blade servers, which were connected to the System z by Gigabit Ethernet.

The combination is both an effective and financially attractive game server system, as the most computation-intensive tasks are offloaded from the expensive CPU cycles of System z and carried out on the more economical Cell blades. Without offloading, the server system required would not be financially feasible.

The gameframe can handle the required transactions (e.g., keeping track of each user's spaceships, weapons, and virtual money even between the players) and the simulation (trajectory of objects and checking for collisions) in a unified and consistent fashion. Thus, it can host a few thousand users at a time, and higher efficiency is experienced when more users are added.

Games with numerous players like World of Warcraft, have tackled this problem by splitting the work among multiple clusters, creating duplicate worlds that don't communicate.

The Cell-augmented mainframe runs Hoplon's virtual-world middleware, called bitVerse, which uses IBM's WebSphere XD and DB2 software.

Around the gameframe, the IBM Virtual Universe Community has evolved.
