= IBM Virtual Universe Community =

IBM interest group

VUC Logo official Logo.

The Virtual Universe Community or VUC is the internal IBM interest group for Virtual Worlds.

Every IBMer that is present within any Virtual World or Virtual Universe must comply with the IBM Virtual World Guidelines.

The community was active in moving IBM into a range of new and profitable industries from the creation of Virtual World Cell Based Mainframes – known as Gameframes – to 24 Hour Virtual Service Desks staffed by avatars around the globe. The community members also worked on numerous projects to promote virtual worlds in the sphere of art, cross cultural collaboration, social enterprise, sustainable development, services based innovation and learning, both on internal IBM grids and public virtual world grids, such as Second Life and other Open Sim based grids.

== History ==
The Virtual Universe Community was officially launched on September 12, 2006, in conjunction with the IBM Innovation Jam. This component of the Jam was a self-organized collaboration and brainstorming event and was referred to as a 3D Jam. 130 IBM employees collaborated on ideas in the virtual campus of New Media Consortium.

On November 14, now 400 members strong, the Virtual Universe Communities idea they had logged in the innovation Jam was voted number 1 out of 50,000 entries. The CEO of IBM Sam Palmisano and Irving Wladalsky-Berger presented the results in the world's first virtual town hall.

The community grew rapidly and when it reached nearly 1000 members a new organization was formed.

The community celebrated its first anniversary on September 12, 2007, and, at its height, was 5000 members strong working on sectors ranging from education, training, and accessibility to cutting-edge research and client as well as serious gaming showcases. Several social events to reunite IBMers and HR training projects were held in Almaden island, in Second Life.

As the industry focus moved on from virtual worlds, the participation in the community declined. The community also explored other areas along the way such as augmented reality and virtual reality hoping to converge multiple concurrent technologies led by some VUC Emeritus Guildmasters.

A Virtual Universe Community isn't well understood. To date, the most comprehensive understanding of VUC or innovation jams has been done by Steve Diasio† of the University of South Florida and Anne Elerud-Tryde‡ of the Chalmers University of Technology.

== Notes ==
†Diasio, S. (2022) A techno-social perspective of innovation jams: defining and characterising, Technology Analysis & Strategic Management, 34:1, 30–46, DOI: 10.1080/09537325.2021.1884674 ‡Elerud-Tryde, A. (2016). Innovation jams as vehicles for innovation An extended perspective on internal innovation jams.
