= Eriksholm: The Stolen Dream =

2025 video game

- Cover art depicting Hanna
- Developer: River End Games
- Publisher: Nordcurrent
- Director: Anders Hejdenberg
- Artist: Johanna Liw
- Writer: Andreas Roman
- Composer: Leif Jonsson
- Engine: Unreal Engine 5
- Platforms: Microsoft Windows; PlayStation 5; Xbox Series X/S; Nintendo Switch 2
- Release: Windows, PS5, Xbox Series X/S; 15 July 2025; Nintendo Switch 2; 3 December 2026
- Genres: Adventure, stealth
- Mode: Single-player

Eriksholm: The Stolen Dream is a 2025 adventure stealth game developed by River End Games and published by Nordcurrent. Set in the fictional city of Eriksholm, the game follows Hanna—a young orphan whose brother, Herman, disappears—as she embarks on a quest to uncover the truth behind his disappearance. Featuring an isometric perspective, the player can choose from three playable characters, including Hanna, as they explore the city, complete objectives and puzzles, and employ stealth to evade enemies. The game's setting is inspired by early-20th-century Scandinavian cities and architecture. Eriksholm: The Stolen Dream was released for Microsoft Windows, PlayStation 5, and Xbox Series X/S in July 2025, and for Nintendo Switch 2 in December 2026. It received generally favorable reviews from critics.

== Gameplay ==
Eriksholm: The Stolen Dream is an adventure stealth game with an isometric perspective that allows the player to freely move the camera to survey the environment. Initially, the game features one playable character—a young orphan named Hanna, who embarks on a quest to find her missing brother, Herman, in the fictional city of Eriksholm. As the story progresses, two additional characters—Alva and Sebastian, who assist Hanna on her journey—become playable. After unlocking all three, the player can swap between characters at any time and use them together to complete objectives, which may have multiple solutions, and solve puzzles. Each character has unique skills, tools, and weapons; for example, Hanna can crawl through vents, Alva can climb drain pipes, and Sebastian can swim. The player uses stealth to evade enemies, and if a character is spotted, the game restarts shortly before that moment. Levels can be explored repeatedly, with collectibles to find and various paths and methods available for each character.

== Synopsis ==
The game is set in the fictional city of Eriksholm located in the Kingdom of Rosmark during the Industrial Revolution. The Kingdom of Rosmark is actively hostile with the neighboring Sakhin people. The game follows a young orphan, Hanna, whose brother Herman disappears after stealing a valuable item, prompting a police pursuit. Hanna enlists the help of Alva and Sebastian and embarks on a quest to uncover the truth behind Herman's disappearance, as events transform them into symbols of change.

Hanna awakens after miraculously surviving an infectious plague called the Heartpox, which causes skin rashes and eventually cardiac arrest. The city of Eriksholm is in decline due to the lack of trade stemming from a Heartpox quarantine. Hanna's brother, Herman, tells her to rest while he goes to work; however, he does not return. The police come to raid the rundown Cutter's Hill district where the siblings live and try to take Hanna to the police station for interrogation, but she escapes them by stowing away on a train. After escaping Cutter's Hill, Hanna seeks out Alva, a Robin Hood-like figure and head of a gang of child thieves that Hanna and Herman were once part of. Hanna recovers her old blowgun from Alva and heads to the Green Rock mine where Herman works to find him. Within the mine, she encounters the group of smugglers trying to negotiate an alliance with Alva to smuggle goods in Eriksholm, due to the high demand from the effect of the quarantine, but does not find Herman. Hanna navigates the mine but falls into a shaft, and is trapped until Alva comes and rescues her. Together, they escape the mine and evade the smugglers and police.

Alva's gang informs them that Herman has been captured and sent to the remote island of Baron Patrick Dahl, who owns a large agricultural and slave trading business in Eriksholm. Hanna enlists Sebastian, her friend and an ex-smuggler, and they infiltrate the Baron's island. However, security is suddenly tightened up due to the arrival of Colonel Viktor Lindh from the Pan Oceanic Company. Eavesdropping on the conversation between the Colonel and the Baron, they learn Lindh has come for Herman, and he threatens the Baron to comply or else Eriksholm's powerful and shadowy Mayor Hansen would come to get Herman himself, stating that Herman stole something of value from Hansen. Hanna and Alva reach Herman's prison cell and reunite, but are discovered by a guard, and Herman is fatally stabbed in the struggle. Hanna and Alva escape the Baron's island, and the Baron is executed by Hansen for his failure. Overcome with grief, Hanna swears revenge on Hansen.

Hanna believes Herman hid what he stole at the siblings' secret hideout at Evergreen South train station. The group sneaks through the upper class Willowbrook district and reach the hideout, finding Herman's bag. Colonel Lindh appears and tries to convince Hanna that he is her ally; however, Hanna brushes it off and leaves. Taking Herman's bag to Alva's safehouse, they discover that Herman stole a box containing a cure for the Heartpox, which he had used to save Hanna. Alva intends to sell the cure to Elizabeth Quist, a shipping baroness of Eriksholm and adversary of the Mayor, to benefit the downtrodden people of Cutter's Hill, while Hanna wants to get Quist to talk about the conspiracy involving Herman and the cure. The trio infiltrate Quist's compound and confront Quist in her mansion. Quist admits that the Heartpox medicine was intended for her sick nephew, and Hansen has been using the cure to blackmail Quist to get her majority vote in the council of Eriksholm so he can remain mayor in the next election. Hanna gives Quist the cure in exchange for a large sum of money to Alva and passage for Hanna to the Baron's state funeral. As Hanna is about to assassinate the Mayor with a poison dart at the funeral, Colonel Lindh arrives and attempts to arrest Hansen for bribery and blackmail, as well as high treason for secretly dealing with the Sakhin. Hansen reveals that he plans for Eriksholm to secede from Rosmark, and his guards force the Colonel to leave. Hanna attempts to come out for the kill, only to be subdued and captured.

During her imprisonment in Eriksholm's citadel, Hansen tells Hanna that he has captured Alva and Sebastian, and gloats that all he did is for the benefit of the people of the city, but Hanna retorts that he is just a power hungry madman. Later, Colonel Lindh and his soldiers arrive and break Hanna out. Lindh informs Hanna that he is an agent of Rosmark's Prime Minister, and wanted to find Herman before Hansen. He confirms that Hansen has allied with the Sakhin and will allow their invasion force to pass through Eriksholm, to start a war with Rosmark while Eriksholm becomes an independent city-state. Hanna rescues both Sebastian and Alva, and they help Lindh's men reach the citadel's main artillery battery so Lindh can fire at the Sakhin to show that Hansen is no longer in control to give them passage to invade Rosmark. Hanna and Alva fight their way to Hansen's operations room and confront him. Hansen justifies his treachery, declaring his disillusionment with the corrupted and decaying political structure of Rosmark, and his belief that the Sakhin can help the people of Eriksholm toward a better future. Alva rebuffs his words, saying that the Sakhin would massacre them instead. At the same time, Lindh and his men manage to seize the artillery and repel the Sakhin. Not wanting to be killed by Hanna's poison dart, Hansen offers to be arrested and put on trial for treason. Lindh allows Hanna to decide whether to kill Hansen; Hanna realizes that since Hansen has committed treason, he is no longer a Rosmark citizen, and suggests handing Hansen over to the Sakhin, subjecting him to a far worse fate for making a fool out of them.

With Quist's money, Alva builds a shelter for homeless and orphans named in Herman's honor. Hanna rides the train to see the beautiful Apple Gardens, like she and her brother had dreamt about.

== Development and release ==
Eriksholm: The Stolen Dream was developed by River End Games, a studio consisting of up to 19 members, including veteran AAA developers who previously worked on Battlefield, Little Nightmares, Mirror's Edge, and Unravel. The game's setting is inspired by early-20th-century Scandinavian cities and architecture, notably Gothenburg—where the studio is based—as well as Stockholm and Malmö, Sweden. Initially, the developers established the game's backstory and populated it with characters; subsequently, they selected their favorite characters and developed individual narratives for them.

When the studio began pre-production, it planned to use either Unreal Engine 5 or Unity. However, since Unity had not yet implemented physically based rendering at that moment, River End felt that Unreal Engine would be the "natural choice". Initially, the team employed proprietary face-scanning technology that produced "really good" results, although the process was described as "very slow and tedious". Eventually, the developers adopted Epic Games' MetaHuman technology to transfer actors' facial performances to character models, deeming it "an extremely useful tool" for their small team. For performance reasons, the studio used "baked lighting" while relying on Unreal Engine's Lumen lighting technology for pre-rendered cutscenes.

Eriksholm: The Stolen Dream was announced at the Future Games Show in June 2024. It was released on 15 July 2025 for PlayStation 5, Windows, and Xbox Series X/S. The game's soundtrack was also released as a DLC on the same day for additional cost.

== Reception ==
Reception

Aggregate scores
Aggregator	Score
Metacritic	PS5: 84/100 (Note: Based on 16 scored reviews of 17 total reviews); Win: 78/100 (Note: Based on 37 scored reviews of 38 total reviews); XSXS: 81/100 (Note: Based on 6 reviews)
OpenCritic	79% recommend (Note: Based on 63 reviews)

Eriksholm: The Stolen Dream received "generally favorable" reviews from critics, according to review aggregator Metacritic. OpenCritic determined that 79% of critics recommended the game.

It was nominated for Best Soundtrack and Best Supporting Role at the Golden Joystick Awards 2025.
