= Telejogo II =

First-generation home video game console

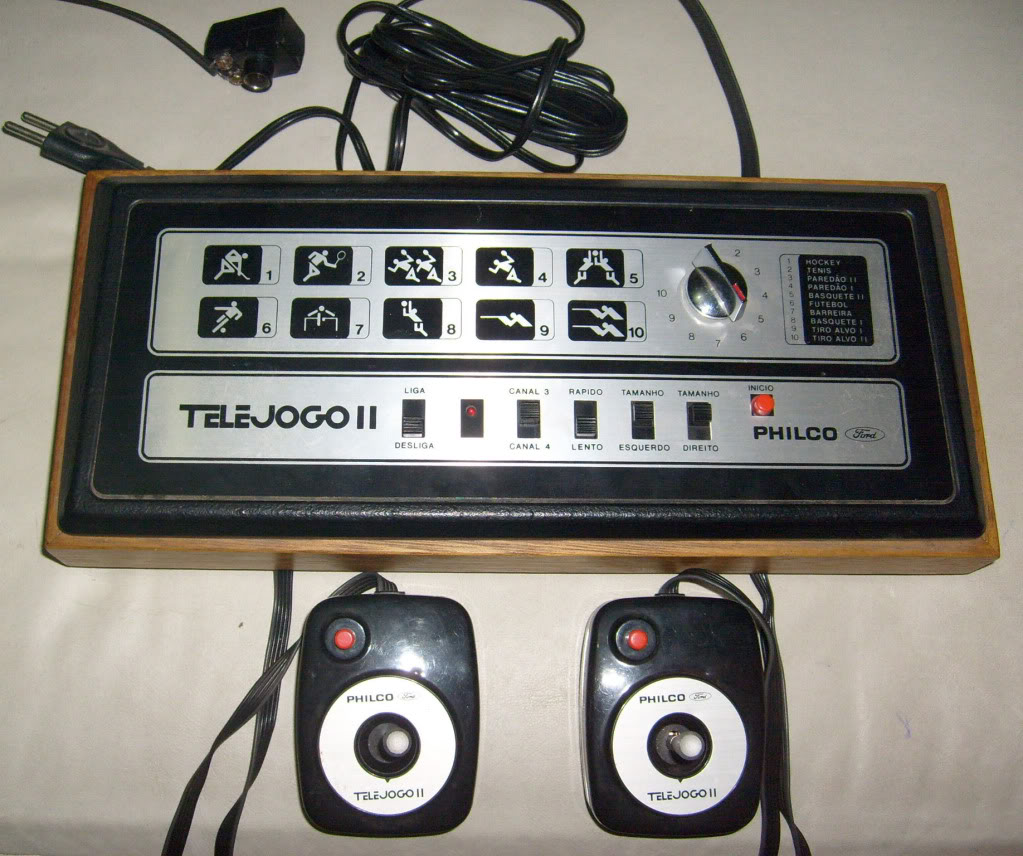
- A Telejogo II
- Manufacturer: Philco, Ford
- Type: Dedicated home video game console
- Generation: First generation
- Released: 1979
- Predecessor: Telejogo

The Telejogo II is a dedicated first-generation home video game console that was manufactured by Philco and Ford and released in 1979 in Brazil as the successor to the 1977 video game console Telejogo.

In contrast to the predecessor, the paddles are no longer attached to the housing of the console itself, but are removable.

== Games ==
Due to the integrated AY-3-8610 chipset, the system is able to play the following ten games:

- Hockey
- Tênis
- Paredão I
- Paredão II
- Basquete I
- Basquete II
- Futebol
- Barreira
- Tiro Alvo I
- Tiro Alvo II

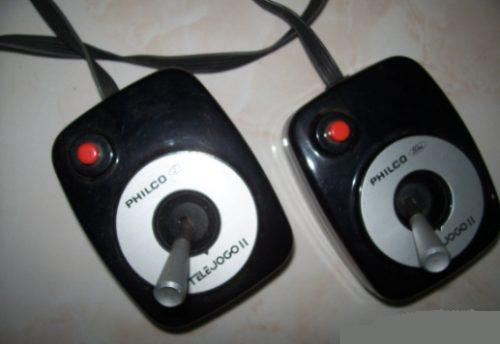
View of Telejogo II controllers
