= Video games in Ireland =

Video game development is a developing industry in Ireland, with some government attempts made to encourage investment via tax breaks. Of the approximately €206 million spent by Irish people on video games in 2015, Irish game developers "[saw] little of this spend".

Video gaming in Ireland grew from the 1970s and, for example, the Atari 2600 was manufactured in Limerick to meet demand for both Irish and export markets. By 2020, video game companies in Ireland included Keywords Studios, Havok and Romero Games. A video games festival was held in Dublin in 2018.

In 2007, the Irish Film Censor's Office (IFCO) was one of four European classification organisations to ban Manhunt 2. The ban, later lifted, was the first video game ban in Ireland. Under the 1989 Video Recordings Act, the head of IFCO "may prohibit a video game" if it is deemed "unfit for viewing". Ratings and classifications in Ireland are otherwise applied through the (voluntary) Pan European Game Information (PEGI) age-rating scheme, of which Ireland is a member.

== Video game companies of Ireland ==
=== Active companies ===
- Demonware (networking code)
- DIGIT Game Studios (mobile games)
- Havok (company) (middleware engine)
- Keywords Studios (game development, localisation, audio, art, QA, etc)
- Romero Games (independent studio)

=== Defunct companies ===
- Eirplay Games (founded 2002 and defunct 2009)
- Emerald Software (founded 1988 and defunct 1991)
- Funcom Dublin Ltd.(branch; 1994 to 2001)

=== Publishers ===
- Playrix (Dublin HQ. Russian publisher & dev. Mobile games.)
