= Taikodom =

- Developer: Hoplon Infotainment
- Publisher: Hoplon Infotainment
- Platform: Microsoft Windows
- Release: BRA: October 15, 2008
- Genre: MMOSG
- Mode: Multiplayer

Taikodom was a computer game by Brazilian developer Hoplon Infotainment. Considered by the developers to be a Massive Social Game rather than MMORPG, Taikodom featured a persistent online outer space environment.

In 2007, an English version of the beta was released. The game was eventually shut down in May 2015.

Hoplon hosted the commercial version on an IBM zSeries (specifically the z9, then later upgrade to a z10) mainframe (also called a "gameframe" because it is linked to bladeservers with Cell/B.E. processors) running Linux.

== Videos ==
- Hoplon Infotainment, Brazil startup and maker of Taikodom online video game 27 Apr 2009 at youtube.com
