= Mullet MadJack =

Single player shooter game

- Developer: Hammer95 Studios
- Publisher: Epopeia Games
- Director: Alessandro C. Martinello
- Designer: Thiago Augusto Weizenmann
- Programmer: Leonardo Zimbres
- Artist: Alessandro C. Martinello
- Composers: Fernando Pepe; Mateus Polati
- Engine: Unity
- Platforms: Microsoft Windows; Xbox One; Xbox Series X/S; Nintendo Switch
- Release: Microsoft Windows; May 15, 2024; Xbox One, Series X/S; March 13, 2025; Nintendo Switch; April 30, 2026
- Genres: First-person shooter, roguelite
- Mode: Single-player

Mullet MadJack is a single-player first-person shooter and roguelite game developed by Hammer95 Studios and published by Epopeia Games. It was released on May 15, 2024 for Microsoft Windows. It was released for Xbox One and Xbox Series X/S on March 13, 2025. It launched on the Xbox Game Pass subscription service. A version for the Nintendo Switch was released on April 30, 2026.

== Gameplay ==
Players assume the role of a "Moderator", Jack Banhammer, who has 10 seconds to navigate each floor, with extra time awarded by killing enemies, consuming soda cans from destroyed vending machines, and performing finishing moves on foes with various items found in the environment. Upon death, Jack restarts from the last checkpoint with all upgrades reset. Players can acquire upgrades and weapons between floors. Obtainable weapons include a revolver, shotgun, rifle, submachine gun, railgun, plasma rifle, and elemental katanas.

The game features multiple game modes, including a campaign, a survival mode, and a boss rush mode. The boss rush mode features a crossover with Ultrakill.

== Plot ==
The game is set in the year 2095, where "Robillionaires" have taken over the world, and humans are addicted to dopamine. Jack Banhammer, a "moderator" hired by Peace Corp, sets out to rescue the "Influencer" from a skyscraper filled with killer Robillionaires in exchange for a new pair of shoes.

Jack eventually reaches an upper floor where he finds Mr. Bullet, one of the top Robillionaires, holding the Influencer hostage, having left her tied to a chair in a bridge between the skyscraper and the neighboring structure. However, this turns out to be a robot decoy, who explodes and blasts Jack away. Jack then spots Mr. Bullet with the real Influencer on the other skyscraper, and uses a sniper to take out Mr. Bullet's henchmen. However, before Jack can kill Mr. Bullet, Mr. Bullet shoots Jack through the head. As Jack dies, Mr. Bullet gloats that he is using the Influencer's virgin blood to start a ritual to find any signs of another world to gain infinite power from.

The Streamer, an unhinged Peace Corp operative who had been monitoring and encouraging Jack, convinces her superiors to resurrect Jack through the "Brain Resurrection Wizard" technology, as the populace loved him. Returned to life, Jack continues his mission, eventually confronting Mr. Bullet atop the other skyscraper, where the Influencer is held nearly drained of blood. Mr. Bullet reveals that he had tried every magic sigil with her blood and found no sign of another world or higher power, gleefully declaring that it meant that Robillionaires were the supreme power, before donning a giant mech suit to battle Jack.

Crippling the suit, Jack grabs the Influencer and dives off the building with her, narrowly surviving by landing in a pool. Getting in Jack's car, the pair make their escape, where Jack finally destroys the still-active Mr. Bullet, who had tried to chase them down. Taking a rest afterwards, the Influencer confessed she was not a virgin, rendering Mr. Bullet's ritual pointless. Together, the two head to Peace Corp headquarters for Jack to retrieve his prize, Jack leaving the Influencer in the car and making his way up to confront the Streamer.

At the prize room, the Streamer reveals that the entire conflict between humanity and the Robillionaires was engineered by Peace Corp, who had been subtly manipulating humanity for 200 years into craving entertainment in place of meaning, such as Jack doing everything for a pair of shoes, effectively reducing humans to no different than the robots who now lorded over them. The Streamer then declared Jack her slave and boyfriend, daring him to prove her wrong and claim his prize by clicking a CAPTCHA, Jack struggling to press the button. The game ends with a screen showing Peace Corp processing Jack's payment and enslavement, but dispensing his shoes anyways.

== Development ==
Developer Hammer95 Studios is based in Rio Grande do Sul, Brazil. The game was influenced by classic anime from the 1980s and 1990s.

The owner and director of Hammer 95 Studios, Alessandro Martinello, had previously directed the 2015 game, Toren, at the studio Swordtales.

== Reception ==
Reception

Aggregate scores
Aggregator	Score
Metacritic	88/100
OpenCritic	100%

Review scores
Publication	Score
Destructoid	9/10
HobbyConsolas	88/100
TouchArcade	4.5/5

The game received positive reviews on Metacritic. Zack Zwiezen of Kotaku said, "It's even better that the game is one of 2024's best, thanks to its solid world-building, awesome visuals, and incredibly fast action." Nick Cramer of IGN said, "It's one of the most 'feels cool to pull off stuff' power trip FPS games I've played since Superhot." Zoey Handley of Destructoid called it "my favorite game released this year".
