= Video games in Latin America =

Video games in Latin America (Note: Alternatively Ludology of Latin America or Gaming in Latin America.) (Note: Spanish: Videojuegos en América Latina; Portuguese: Videojogos na América Latina) are a popular source of entertainment among young and middle-aged Latin Americans. The video game market in Latin America has been rapidly growing since the early 2010s, and it is one of fastest growing in the global market. In 2016, the market had already overtaken those in music, magazines and radio.

As of 2022, there were 316 million gamers in Latin America. With the Latin American game market being worth $8.4 billion in 2022, video games have become a widely dispersed, active hobby for many Latin Americans. Despite the growing populations of Latin America, their games market only represents 5% of the global market in 2022 – 1% ahead of the other emerging regions of the Middle East and Africa.

== Characters ==
Even though the Americas have a large population of gamers, Hispanic or Latin American characters are seldom the main characters in games. However, there are some popular characters with more Latin American influence, including King from the Tekken series, Isabela Keyes from Dead Rising, and Dominic Santiago from Gears of War.

University of Delaware professor Phillip Penix-Tadsen contributed to this field of ludology in Latin America. His work separates these Latin America-inspired games into three different groups: contras, which depict Latin America as an antagonistic force to the American war-hero; tomb raiders, in which Latin American cultural imagery and symbols are used as a background to the player’s mission to plunder whatever they can; and luchadores, which represent both the Mexican wrestling phenomenon, as well as games that fail to sufficiently represent the cultures to which they contain elements of.

While certain video games have been used to mobilize political activity and suppress dissenters, video games have become an integral part of Latin American culture. Despite this, many representations of Latin American places and people in video games contain the influences of colonialism, which creates another dimension of social and economic impact. One video game that accurately depicts the time and culture of Latin America is Assassin's Creed IV: Black Flag. Parts of the game depict the Caribbean with historically accurate locations, people, and events, as well as the horrors of the slave trade and sugar plantations.

== Demographics ==
The population of people who play video games is diverse in Latin America. It includes people of various age groups, including children and young adults. Surveys found that 88.1% of male and 87.23% of female participants played mobile games. While 18- to 24-year-olds were more likely to be mobile gamers than 25- to 34-year-olds, they both had a higher share than those aged 45 and over. 41% of respondents reported spending an hour or more playing mobile games. This is a sizeable amount, as 50% of the Global Games Market revenue came from mobile games in 2022. Overall, this shows a strong desire for gaming not only among the traditional audiences, but to anyone with a mobile device.

Two games female Latin Americans play more than their male counterparts are Super Mario Bros. and Candy Crush. Core players have slightly more males with 52%, and the majority of professional gamers and live streamers are also males.

== Game design ==
As the demand for video games in Latin America increased, the desires for Latin American developers to create their own games has increased as well. Games such as Kingdom Rush developed by Ironhide Game Studio became popular beyond the Latin America market by appealing to larger Western audiences. At launch, the game was multilingual and set in the fantasy genre, incorporating elements from American popular culture, such as The Lord of the Rings. This appeal to the preferences of wider audiences was very successful, yet other developers found success in authentically representing their roots and heritage.

An important aspect of game design is the changes the games undergo to appeal to specific audiences around the globe, known as localization. While these changes can increase the chances of a positive reception in certain cultures, true representation of Latin American culture comes from considering the history, religion, cultural cleavages, and location-based issues of the culture in the beginning of developing a game. Game developers in periphery countries also face the difficulties associated in participating in a global market largely dominated by Japan, China, and the West, leading them to adopt the strategies and popular genres of the core market to stay competitive. Video games also show potential as effective learning tools, if they met the thresholds set by a benefits, costs, and feasibility analysis.

Moreover, video games can function as an outlet for the developer's political or social commentary. Therefore, Mexican developer KaraOkulta created a game called Trumpéalo, which is a game that involves throwing items like rotten fruit at former United States president Donald Trump to make him leave the stage.

== Revenue ==
In 2016, in Argentina, Brazil, and Mexico alone, $4.1 billion was spent on video games. This is the second highest region in the world for video games. For phones, $1.4 billion will be reached by the end of 2017. The gaming industry in Latin America is rapidly growing, with a growth of 10% year-over-year all the way through 2028. Nearly 80% of individuals who play videos games spent money on those games in Latin America and the Caribbean. Latin Americans spent over $8.8 Billion USD on physical and digital games in 2023.

== See also ==
- Japan–Latin America relations
- Latin America–United States relations

Specific

- Video games in Brazil
- Video games in Colombia
