= Telejogo =

First-generation home video game console

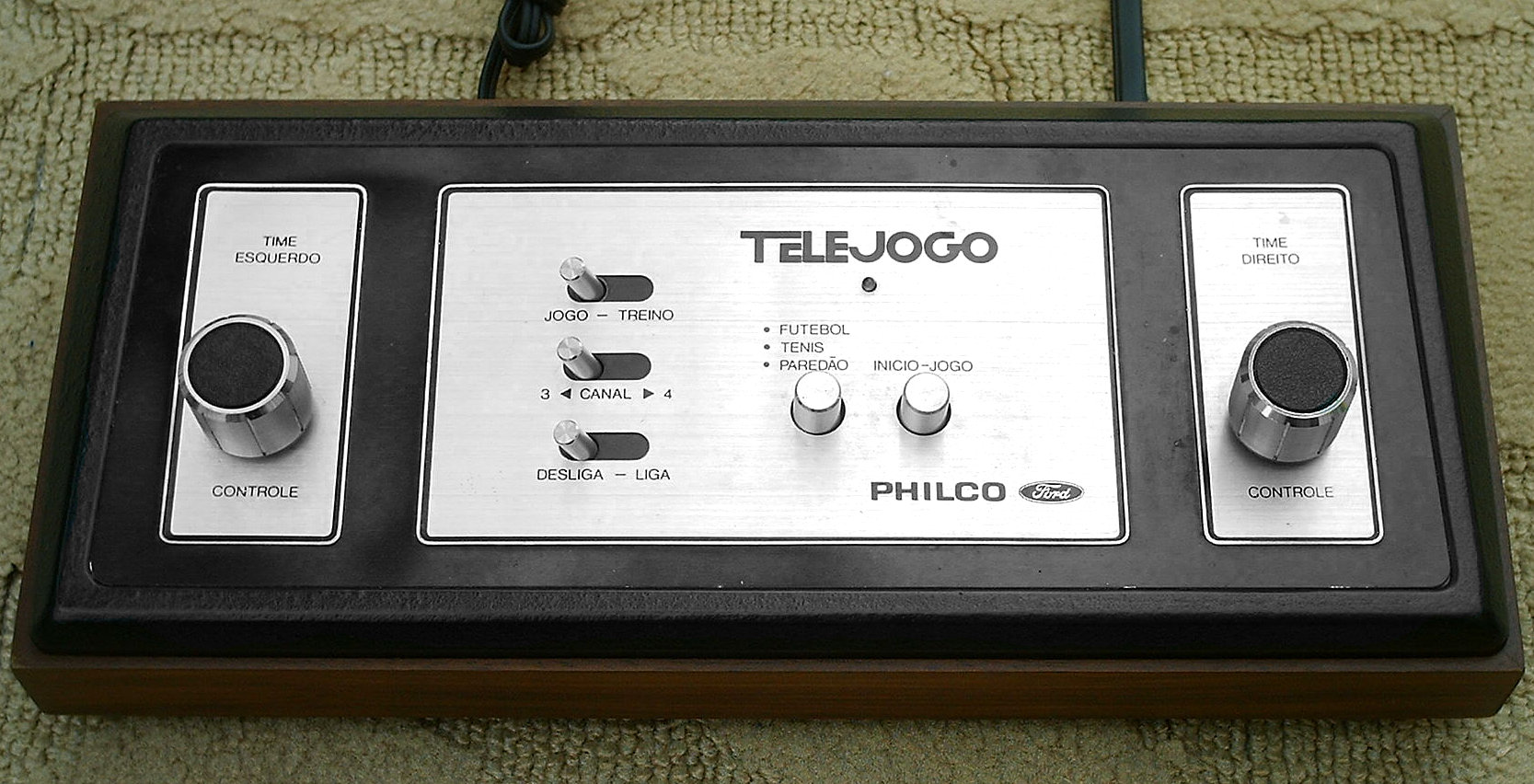
- A Telejogo
- Manufacturer: Philco, Ford
- Type: Dedicated home video game console
- Generation: First generation
- Released: August 2, 1977
- Successor: Telejogo II

The Telejogo (Portuguese for telegame, with tele being short for televisão, portuguese for television) is a dedicated first-generation home video game console that was released on August 2, 1977 by Philco and Ford in Brazil. It is a Pong clone console and the first video game console ever released in Brazil. The original Telejogo performed well on the market for the time. In 1979, a successor called Telejogo II was released.

== Games ==
With the integrated MM57100N chipset from National Semiconductor, players can choose from the following three games:

- pingue pongue
- futebol
- paredão

The system produced black and white graphics because the output was in NTSC and the standard in Brazil was exclusively PAL-M in the 70s and 80s. If connected to an NTSC TV it will be in color.
