= Liz Yeraldine Marcano Cabeza =

Venezuelan karateka (born 1992)

- Born: June 3, 1992 (age 34)
- Nationality: Venezuela

Liz Yeraldine Marcano Cabeza (born 3 June 1992) is a Venezuelan karateka. She was eligible to participate at the Deaflympics as Karate has been recognised as a sporting event at the Deaflympics since 2009.

Marcano Cabeza represented Venezuela at the Deaflympics in 2013 and 2017. She soon became a popular karateka at the multi-sport event, as she claimed seven medals in her Deaflympic career, including five gold medals.
