= Incidente em Varginha =

1998 shooter video game

- Developer: Perceptum
- Engine: 3D GameStudio
- Release: 1998
- Genre: First-person shooter

Incidente em Varginha (also released as The Varginha Incident, Alien Anarchy, Alien Shootout and Анархия in different regions) is a 1998 Brazilian first-person shooter game developed by Perceptum Informática. The game is based on the Varginha UFO incident, in which three people claimed to have seen an alien in the city of Varginha, Brazil.

== Development ==
Incidente em Varginha was designed by Marcos Cuzziol (software engineer), Odair Gaspar (industrial engineer and programmer) and Fábio Cardelli (sound designer). The game was announced in a press release on 10/09/98. After release, Perceptum signed an agreement with U.S. Special Forces training center and NovaLogic in order to use the software to train Delta Force soldiers.

== Critical reception and legacy ==
Two thousand copies were sold in Brazil and 20,000 in the rest of the world.

The game has a legacy of being Brazil's first FPS.
