= Toren (video game) =

2015 video game

- Developer: Swordtales
- Designer: Alessandro Martinello
- Writer: Rodrigo Aragão
- Composers: Vinicius Kleinsorgen; Lucas Flicky
- Platforms: PlayStation 4, Microsoft Windows, macOS
- Release: 12 May 2015
- Genres: Action-adventure, puzzle
- Mode: Single-player

Toren is a 2015 action-adventure puzzle video game for Microsoft Windows and PlayStation 4, developed by Brazilian studio Swordtales and published by Versus Evil. Inspired by games such as Ico, Shadow of the Colossus and The Legend of Zelda, Toren was the first game funded by Brazilian government's public tax credit, through Rouanet Law.

== Plot ==
In Toren, the player controls the Moonchild, a girl born in a magic tower, and who has the goal to reach the top of it. The game begins with her as a baby; she grows up and develops as she goes up the tower's levels, solving puzzles and avoiding traps until defeating the dragon that lives at the top of the tower. Moonchild has visions about a wizard, her own origin and tower's nature.

== Development ==
Toren (Dutch for "tower") started development in 2011. Swordtales' staff pledged funding by the Rouanet Law in 2013, achieving R$75 thousand. The law began to award electronic game cultural projects in 2011. Total budget of the game was R$350,000, the rest of the money being funded by sponsors.

== Reception ==
Toren was met with a mixed reception by the video game press. The ambiance "full of symbolism and mysticism" were praised but the game's problematic controls, camera angles and bugs were criticized.

Reception

Aggregate scores
Aggregator	Score	
Aggregator	PC	PS4
GameRankings	62.87/100	61.45/100
Metacritic	57/100	56/100

Review scores
Publication	Score	
Publication	PC	PS4
Destructoid	6/10	N/A
GameSpot	5/10	N/A
IGN	6.5/10	N/A

== Legacy ==
The GOG.com store page for the PC version of Toren was delisted on August 4, 2022. Although the Steam store page and the PS4 version's store pages were still up. It was stated to be caused by 'expiring licensing rights'.

The director of Swordtales, Alessandro Martinello, has since moved on to direct another game called Mullet MadJack (first released 2024) at his new studio Hammer 95 Studios.
