= Dhaka Racing =

2002 video game

- Developer: eSophers
- Publisher: eSophers
- Designers: Ashik Noon; Adnan Karim
- Programmers: Mozammel Haque; Ruman Zakaria
- Platform: Microsoft Windows
- Release: Demo version 2 March 2002; Commercial version 12 January 2003
- Genre: Racing
- Mode: Single-player

Dhaka Racing (Bengali: ঢাকা রেসিং) is a racing video game developed and published by eSophers Ltd. Its demo version was released on 2 March 2002, for Microsoft Windows with the commercial version being released on 12 January 2003, and it is the first 3D game developed in Bangladesh. The game is set on the streets of Dhaka.

The final version of the game was released at the Bangladesh Computer Society (BCS) Computer Fair, Bangabandhu International Conference Centre (BICC), Agargaon on 12 January 2003. It received the Best Product Award of that fair from the country's president, Iajuddin Ahmed.

== Gameplay ==
The game features some of the famous and busy streets of Dhaka. Players choose from 8 different vehicles including traditional Bangladeshi vehicles, such as the rickshaw and auto rickshaw. Players select from four different locations for racing: Manik Mia Avenue, Chandrima/Zia Uddyan, the Ramna Park area or the runway of Zia International Airport, along with a special track – the Sylhet Osmani International Airport area. Players can also choose weather conditions. There is a game mode called Rickshaw Mania where the player can have a race as a rickshaw driver against other rickshaws.

== Development ==
The founders, chief designers and programmers of the game, Ashik Noon and Adnan Karim were only final-year students of computer science and engineering at the North South University during the development of the game. Noon and Karim took 500 pictures of various streets in Dhaka to make the game realistic. The graphics modeling was done through Autodesk 3ds Max while the game's logic, artificial intelligence, vehicle movement and behavior was programmed using Visual C++.

== Reception ==
Initially, a demo version of the game was released in March 2002. A few months later on 12 January 2003, the full version came into the market. The game received the Best Product award at BCS Computer Fair 2003. To protect it from piracy, the developers later only allowed the game to be downloaded online through payments.

Dhaka Race received widespread acclaim and pioneered the 3D video game industry of Bangladesh. Then-President of Bangladesh Dr. A. Q. M. Badruddoza Chowdhury gave a special award to Noon and Karim for developing the first 3D game in the country. ICT Minister of Bangladesh Dr. Abdul Moyeen Khan also appreciated the game.

Later, eSophers developed multiple 3D games such as Bangladesh 71 (a first-person shooter game set during the Bangladesh Liberation War), JPGL Boat Racing Game (a multiplayer boat racing game for British American Tobacco), Kolkata Racing (a racing game for Sonolite Multimedia India) for local and international markets.
