= Video games in Colombia =

Video games in Colombia are a popular form of entertainment among young and middle-aged Colombians. The medium has been popular in Colombia since the 1980s, but little local development had taken place until the turn of the 21st century. As the country has been producing many engineers since the early 2010s, many of which specialized in electronics, industry and information technology, the local video game industry has been booming.

== History ==
Because video games and consoles have traditionally been released in Colombia around the same time as they appeared in the United States, the history of video game development in Colombia dates back to the late 1980s.

Inspired by games such as Pokémon and Super Mario Bros., young people started programming short game experiences. In the early days of the video game industry, large enterprises developed games for foreign studios while smaller, independent companies built games mostly unnoticed.

An annual festival, first held in 2006, was organized by Oscar Andrade, which was one of the first entertainment media events that allowed game developers to showcase themselves and their works.

The Colombian game industry received a large boost in 2009 due to roundtable discussions by the Telecommunications Research Center. The company freely exchanged information in order to support the growth of the local ICT industry. Founder of Immersion Games Ernasto Galvez was chosen as a guest speaker at the first Forum of Digital Content, which opened the door for various small game studios.

Since 2009, the growth and internationalization of the video game industry in Colombia has been supported by government entity Proexport Colombia. In January 2012, the sector was added to the country's "Vive Digital Plan," which seeks to improve the country's digital infrastructure.

Nineteen Colombian video game companies attended the 2012 Game Developers Conference, five of which were able to surprise American journalists and international buyers by showing off a large amount of quality. The companies present at the event came back with various business deals.

The digital-content industry of Colombia, which includes video games as well as other applications, recorded exports of 7 million USD in 2011 and US$19 million in 2012. "Entrepreneurial innovation system" Ruta N promotes innovative business based on technology in Medellín, while Colombia 3.0 is a national summit of digital content held yearly in Bogotá. The Colombian chapter of the International Game Developers Association (IGDA), a non-profit organization, is a key player which focuses on fostering game-development in the country.

In 2015, educational video games were released in Colombia that were designed to help children learn about a few of the country's many ethnic groups. The video games were released in order to "contribute to the preservation of native culture," as video games are considered "the language children use today.

== Opinions ==
Jairo Nieto of Brainz Games has stated that the Colombian video game industry started to evolve rapidly when companies such as Apple and Google opened their mobile platforms to independent developers. Furthermore, according to Nieto, "[Government] support is invaluable for the growth of the game industry of Colombia." Though the Colombian government's financial support of the sector has been viewed positively by local gamers, this is mostly because the local government focuses specifically on public relations by creating events and contests.

== See also ==
- Hispanic and Latino representation in video games
- Video games in Brazil
- Video games in Latin America
