= OpenSimulator =

Open-source server platform for hosting virtual worlds

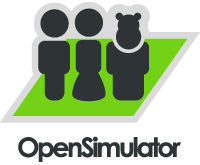
- Stable release: 0.9.3.0 / November 8, 2024; 7 months ago
- Operating system: Cross-platform
- Type: Server
- License: BSD
- Website: opensimulator.org/wiki/Main_Page

Inventory Archive
- Filename extension: .iar
- UTI conformation: application/tar
- Developed by: OpenSimulator
- Type of format: File archiver

OpenSimulator Archive
- Filename extension: .oar
- Internet media type: application/oar
- UTI conformation: application/tar
- Developed by: OpenSimulator
- Type of format: File archiver

OpenSimulator is an open-source server platform originally launched in 2007 for hosting virtual worlds and metaverse environments. It is largely compatible with the virtual world Second Life but full compatibility is not a design goal.

== Features ==
OpenSimulator is written in C# and is designed to be easily expanded through the use of plugin modules. OpenSimulator can operate in one of two modes: standalone or grid mode. In standalone mode, a single process handles the entire simulation. In grid mode, various aspects of the simulation are separated among multiple processes, which can exist on different machines.

OpenSimulator uses loadable modules for most of its functionality. These loadable modules can be independently developed to add functionality to the server.

OpenSimulator currently uses a modified Second Life protocol for client to server communication, and requires retrofitting to a suitable virtual world viewer (client) in order to connect. Interoperability with Second Life protocols was initially a design goal. During the OpenSimulator Community Conference 2018, the core developers announced they may not always seek to maintain compatibility with Linden Lab's Second Life Protocols, and may change or add facilities in line with differing aims.

OpenSim has a number of features not available in Second Life. These include virtual world content (OAR) and avatar inventory (IAR) save and load capabilities, extensions to the scripting language that enable saving and retrieval of text data to avatar inventory in notecard format and the creation and management of non-player characters (NPCs).

OpenSim also uses an architecture known as "Hypergrid", which allows users to teleport between multiple OpenSim-based virtual worlds by providing a hyperlinked map which indexes public grids. This allows for public grids to retain teleportation links to each other without having to be on the same grid. The number of hypergrid-enabled OpenSimulator grids fluctuates. As of February 2023, there were just over 400 active hypergrid-enabled services.

== See also ==
- Open Wonderland – A Java-based open source 3D toolkit for creating collaborative virtual worlds.
- IBM Virtual Universe Community – One of the largest contributors to the OpenSim project.
- Open Cobalt – A decentralized open source virtual world architecture.
- High Fidelity Inc - A "next-generation" social virtual reality platform.
- JanusVR - Immersive web browsing software support VR and loading worlds via web content
