= Arturo J. Marcano Guevara =

Arturo J. Marcano Guevara, a native of Caracas, Venezuela, is an author on the topic of professional baseball in Latin America.

With Professor David P. Fidler of Indiana University, Marcano has been at the forefront of generating awareness in the United States, Canada, and Latin America about problems in Latin American countries caused by the globalization of baseball. His ground-breaking scholarship with Professor Fidler includes "The Globalization of Baseball: Major League Baseball and the Mistreatment of Latin American Baseball Talent," published in the Indiana Journal of Global Legal Studies (1999); “Stealing Lives: the Globalization of Baseball and the Tragic Story of Alexis Quiroz”; and “Exploitation and Reform: Major League Baseball’s Recruitment of Latin American Baseball Talent” (North American Congress on Latin America (NACLA), Volume XXXVII No. 5, March–April 2004).

Marcano is also the co-author of several letters and reports sent to Major League Baseball (MLB) authorities and staff highlighting issues related to the globalization of baseball. Marcano served as the International Legal Advisor to the Venezuelan Baseball Players Association, advising on issues affecting professional baseball in Venezuela.

Marcano and Fidler argue that Major League Baseball deserves criticism from non-governmental organizations for human rights and labor standards, suggesting that the solution to MLB "unfair labor practices in the Dominican Republic is the unionization of Dominican players".

Marcano earned his law degree from Universidad Católica Andrés Bello in Caracas, Venezuela in 1992, received an LL.M. degree from Indiana University School of Law in 1998, and a Master of Science (M.S.) in Sport Management from the University of Massachusetts Amherst in 2005.

He has two daughters, Isabella, and Lucia.

== See also ==
- Venezuelan Professional Baseball League
