= Video games in Malaysia =

Video gaming industry in Malaysia is a developed industry and pastime in Malaysia that includes the production, sale, import/export, and playing of video games. In 2019, Malaysia was the 21st largest video game market in the world, with a total revenue of USD633 million gained.

With support by government such as Malaysian Digital Economy Corporation (MDEC), video games industry in Malaysia saw a rapid development and considered as one of the largest gaming market in Southeast Asia.

== History ==
Malaysia entered the video game industry in 1990s, notably in 1994 when Motion Pixel, a small Malaysian studio was offered by LucasArts and JVC to work together for a video game named Ghoul Patrol. the game's development was the first notable milestone of the Malaysian video game industry.

The video game industry started to going further after encouragement from Prime Minister Mahathir Mohamad to explore more in digital sector. Along with animation industry, video games are one of the MDEC's main focus for digital content development. Several studios founded as the response such as Metronomik Studios and Magnus Games Studio.

== International gaming industry ==
Malaysia is the home of the first and only Sony Interactive Entertainment Worldwide Studios in ASEAN region, known as Malaysia Studio for Southeast Asia region and served as technical support studio for some video games. It is led by Hasnul Hadi Samsudin, former MDEC Vice President of Digital Creative Content Division.
