= Cooking Fever =

2014 video game

- Developer: Nordcurrent
- Publisher: Nordcurrent
- Platforms: iOS, Android, Windows Phone
- Release: September 27, 2014: iOS; September 27, 2014; Android; March 2, 2015; Windows Phone; 2015
- Genre: Simulation
- Mode: Single-player

Cooking Fever is a 2014 cooking simulation game developed and published by the Lithuanian studio Nordcurrent. Since initially releasing for iOS on September 27, 2014, Cooking Fever has garnered 450 million downloads.

In 2015, Cooking Fever was named game of the year by the LT Game Awards.

== Gameplay ==
Cooking Fever is a cooking simulation game. The player must cook food as quickly as possible to fulfill incoming customers' orders.

== Development and release ==
Cooking Fever was developed by Nordcurrent, a studio based in Vilnius, Lithuania. They had previously produced mobile games including Happy Chef and Building the Great Wall of China. The game was released for Android on March 2, 2015, and for the Windows Phone later in the year.

The game had surpassed 50 million downloads by July 2015 and 100 million downloads by March 2017. As of 2024, Cooking Fever has been downloaded 450 million times. For the game's tenth anniversary, Nordcurrent will run a real-life recreation of the game to break a Guinness World Record for the most burgers assembled in one minute.

== Collaborations ==
On December 1, 2017, Nordcurrent collaborated with Coca-Cola to release an update where players can sell official Coca-Cola beverages in-game.

Cooking Fever had its fourth collaboration on December 16, 2019, with the Hard Rock Cafe. This partnership gave players worldwide the ability to step inside the kitchen of the virtual Hard Rock Cafe. The name of the restaurant was then changed to the "Rock & Roll Bar" due to copyright reasons.

In 2024, Cooking Fever collaborated with TGI Fridays, adding branded items. In January, two weeks after being released, the game mode was played over four million times.

== Spinoff ==
A player versus player spinoff known as Cooking Fever Duels was released on December 7, 2023.
