= Timeline of arcade video game history =

The following article is a broad timeline of arcade video games.

== Early history (1971–1977) ==
1971
At Stanford University, two students release the PDP-11-based machine Galaxy Game. It is a clone of Spacewar!, one of the earliest video games, developed in 1962.
Syzygy Engineering, a precursor to Atari, Inc. launches Computer Space, the first commercial video arcade game, also being a Spacewar! derivative.
1972
Atari, Inc. launches Pong, the first commercially successful video game. It is also the first arcade sports video game.
1974
Taito releases Speed Race, which introduces scrolling sprite graphics, and features a racing wheel controller. Midway releases it as Racer in the United States.
1975
Midway MFG. releases Gun Fight, an adaptation of Taito's Western Gun and the first arcade video game to use a microprocessor, which the original incarnation did not use, allowing for improved graphics and smoother animation.
Exidy releases Destruction Derby.
Atari, Inc. releases Hi-way, which was Atari's first game to use a cockpit cabinet.
Atari, Inc. releases Crash 'N Score, Gameplay is an early example of a simulation of a demolition derby.
Atari, Inc. releases Indy 800, Gameplay is a simulation of an Indianapolis 500 style race, the cabinet also features overhead mirrors to allow spectators to watch the game while it's being played.
Atari, Inc. releases Steeplechase.
1976
Sega releases Moto-Cross, which features haptic feedback, causing the handlebars to vibrate during collisions. Sega-Gremlin re-brands it as Fonz.
Dr. Reiner Foerst releases Nürburgring 1 in Germany. It is recognized as the world's first first-person racing video game or the first three-dimensional racing video game.
Sega releases Heavyweight Champ, which is the first video game to feature hand-to-hand fighting.
Atari Inc. releases Night Driver, an early example of a first-person perspective racing video game.
Atari releases Breakout, which inspires a number of Breakout clones.
Exidy releases Death Race. It was the first video game to inspire protest and cause panic.
Gremlin releases Blockade, the first of what become known as snake games.
Taito releases Speed Race Twin, a sequel to Speed Race that allows simultaneous two-player competitive gameplay.
1977
Cinematronics releases Space Wars, the first vector graphics arcade game.
Kee Games releases Drag Race, which was later adapted in 1980 into an Atari 2600 video game by Activision called Dragster.
Atari, Inc. releases Canyon Bomber.
Atari, Inc releases Super Bug, which was designed by Wendi Allen (Note: Known then as Howard Delman.) who also designed Canyon Bomber.
Midway releases Boot Hill, which is a sequel to the 1975 video game Gun Fight.

== Golden age (1978–1986) ==
1978
Taito releases Space Invaders, the first blockbuster arcade video game, responsible for starting the golden age of video arcade games. It also sets the template for the shoot 'em up genre, and influences nearly every shooter game released since then.
1979
Atari releases Lunar Lander and Asteroids, a major hit in the United States and Atari's best selling game of all time.
Namco releases Galaxian, which is in RGB colour.
1980
Sun Electronics releases Speak & Rescue (スピーク&レスキュー) in May 1980, released in North America as Stratovox and released in North America by Taito. It is the first video game with voice synthesis.
Atari releases Battlezone, a first-person shooter tank combat game.
Namco releases Pac-Man, its biggest-selling game. One of the most influential games, it had the first gaming mascot character, established the maze chase genre, opened gaming to female audiences, and introduced power-ups and cutscenes.
Data East releases DECO Cassette System, the first standardized arcade platform, for which many games were made.
1981
Sega/Gremlin releases Space Fury, the first color vector arcade game.
Nintendo releases Donkey Kong, which was one of the first platform games. It was also the game that introduced Mario (named simply "Jumpman" at the time) to the video game world.
Namco releases Galaga, sequel to Galaxian.
Konami releases Scramble, the first side-scrolling shooter with forced scrolling and multiple distinct levels.
Konami releases Frogger, a popular arcade action game.
Williams Electronics release Defender, a more challenging shoot-em-up space game with control configuration of five buttons and a joystick.
1982
Williams Electronics releases Joust.
Namco releases Pole Position, one of the most popular racing games of all time. This is also Namco's first game to feature a 16-bit CPU making it the first 16-bit video game.
Nintendo releases Donkey Kong Jr. and features Mario as the villain.
1983
Bally Midway releases Journey, the first game with digitized sprites.
Astron Belt, the first laserdisc video game, is released by Sega.
Dragon's Lair, the first video game to use cel-animated video instead of computer-generated graphics was advertised as the first truly 3D video game and as the meeting point of video games and animated films.
Atari brings Star Wars to the arcades in the form of a 3D vector graphics simulation of the movie's attack on the Death Star sequence and featuring digitized samples of voices from the movie.
Nintendo releases Mario Bros. and Donkey Kong 3.
Star Rider is released as an arcade laserdisc game by Williams Electronics and is the first commercially released video game to use pre-rendered 3D graphics.
Cube Quest is released as an arcade laserdisc game by Simutrek and is the first commercially released video game with real-time 3D computer graphics
1984
Marble Madness is released by Atari Games.
I, Robot is released by Atari, inc. and is the first commercially released arcade video game to be fully rendered in solid-filled, flat-shaded 3D Polygon Graphics in every element of the game and the first with a camera angle.
Return of the Jedi is released by Atari, inc.
Karate Champ is released by Data East and is the first one-on-one arcade martial arts fighting game that helped defined the genre paving the way for games like Street Fighter and Mortal Kombat.
Kung-Fu Master is released by Irem and is the first beat' em up arcade game and was a success that defined the genre a few years before Double Dragon.
Pac-Land is released by Namco and is an early side-scrolling platform game.
Flicky is released by Sega and is one of the very popular side-scrolling platform games for its time.
Ninja Hayate is released by Taito and is a very popular arcade laser-disc game similar to Dragon's Lair.
Punch-Out!! is released and is one of Nintendo's very successful arcade games.
Super Punch-Out!! is released by Nintendo later that same year and is another popular arcade boxing game.
Bally Midway released Zwackery and is their first game using M68000 16-bit CPU making it their first 16-bit game.
Turkey Shoot is released by Williams Electronics.
The Last Starfighter arcade game based on the 1984 movie of the same name was planned to be released by Atari Games. It was canceled due to the high cost of the hardware and Atari's President did not think the game was going to be a success and was too expensive to sell at that time. If released, it would have been the first arcade game with a 1st-person perspective to use 3D polygonal graphics.
1985
Gauntlet is released by Atari Games
Gradius (Nemesis in some countries) is released by Konami.
Space Harrier is released by Sega
Tehkan World Cup, the father of soccer games with an above view of the field, is released by Tehkan, who also release its stablemate, Gridiron Fight.
Air Race was also planned to be released by Atari in 1985. Due to the high cost of the hardware, the game also was canceled. If released, it would have been the first arcade racing game to use 3D polygon graphics.
The Empire Strikes Back is released and became Atari's last major vector-based arcade game.
Paperboy was also released by Atari Games.
1986
Vs. Super Mario Bros., the arcade version of Super Mario Bros. originally on the Nintendo Entertainment System (Famicom in Japan), is released into arcades.
Taito releases Bubble Bobble.
Sega releases Out Run.
Chiller by Exidy is released and is an early example of blood and gore.
Top Gunner by Exidy is released and is the last commercial arcade video game to use vector-based(wireframe) graphics.
Turbo Kourier is released by the Vivid Group and is the first coin-operated Virtual Reality arcade video game to use 3D Polygon Graphics.

== Post–golden age (1987–present) ==
1987
Technōs Japan releases Double Dragon. It became a huge hit, paving the way for beat 'em up games.
1988
NARC, by Williams is released and is the first commercially released game to use a 32-bit processor.
Namco releases Assault, which was the first game to make use of massive sprite rotation as well as sprite scaling. It also released Splatterhouse, which was the first game to get a parental advisory disclaimer.
Namco introduces the Namco System 21 "Polygonizer", the first arcade system board designed for 3D polygonal graphics. The first game to use it is the racing video game Winning Run.
Top Landing by Taito is released and is the first coin-operated flight simulation to use 3D polygon graphics and runs on Taito's Air System board.
Tetris makes the jump from home to arcade as an Atari coin-op.
1989
Exterminator by Gottlieb is released and is the first video game to use fully digitized graphics in every element of the game. This was Gottlieb's last video game.
Hard Drivin', by Atari Games is released and is the second arcade driving game to have 3D polygonal graphics.
S.T.U.N. Runner is released by Atari Games and is known for early use of high-speed 3-D Polygonal Graphics.
1990
Pit-Fighter is released by Atari Games and is the first-ever fighting game to use fully digitized graphics. Released two years before Midway's Mortal Kombat.
Galaxian³ is released by Namco as a video game Theme Park Attraction and is the first to feature 8-players. This game is a sequel to the Galaxian series and is known for combining pre-laserdisc background images and 3D Polygonal graphics. It was later released as an arcade cabinet to the public in 1994.
NAM-1975 is released by SNK and is the first game running on a Neo Geo hardware and became the standardized arcade platform throughout the 90s to the early 2000s. Many 2D fighting games like Fatal Fury, World Heroes, and Samurai Showdown ran on this hardware and was very popular in the arcades for its time.
1991
Capcom releases Street Fighter II, revolutionizing competitive play in the arcade setting and setting the template for fighting games.
1992
Midway Games releases Mortal Kombat, which features blood and fatalities.
Sega releases Virtua Racing, Sega's first 3D racer as well as Sega's first polygonal 3D game.
1993
Mortal Kombat II is released, featuring high quality digitized graphics, and the most advanced sound system in arcades at the time, the DCS sound system which allowed for MP3 style compression to all sounds.
Sega releases Virtua Fighter, the first 3D fighting game.
1994
Killer Instinct is released, the first arcade game with a hard disk, up to that point the game with the highest quality graphics pre-rendered by a rendering program, featuring to this day the highest quality use of the movie background technique.
Namco releases Tekken, another fighting game.
1995
Midway Games releases Mortal Kombat 3, which was part of the Mortal Kombat series.
1996
SNK releases Metal Slug, a run and gun game widely known for its sense of humor, fluid hand-drawn animation, and fast-paced two-player action.
1998
Konami releases Dance Dance Revolution, an arcade game with four arrow pads that the players used to "dance." This game would create many sequels and spin-offs.
Gauntlet Legends is released by Atari Games and it is the first game in the Gauntlet series to be produced in 3D and is the last Gauntlet game released by Atari Games.
Sega releases House of the Dead 2 and is the first game running on Sega's NAOMI hardware. Like the Neo Geo arcade hardware, it became a standard for many 3D arcade games during that time.
1999
Rush 2049 is released, the last arcade game to bear the Atari Games logo. Atari Games in Milpitas is renamed Midway Games West, and closes its coin-op product development division.
Hydro Thunder is released by Midway Games. It is a 3D speedboat racing game and was one of the first to run on QuickSilver II hardware, a windows-based hardware setup that was less expensive to use. The game was one of Midway Games most successful arcade games to date.
Derby Owners Club which was the first large-scale satellite arcade machine with smartcards, which have become a staple in Japanese game centers since.
2000
Marvel vs. Capcom 2: New Age of Heroes was released by Capcom and ran on Sega's NAOMI hardware. This game combined 2D character sprites, background arenas and special effects that were 3D polygon based.
2001
Namco releases Tekken 4, the first talking game to feature almost all characters talking to one another.
Sega releases Virtua Fighter 4, the first arcade game with online features in Japan.
2002
Arctic Thunder Special Edition is released and is the last arcade game by Midway Games and runs on a PC based Hardware Midway Graphite. Its arcade division was later shut down.
Sega launched World Club Champion Football, which introduced trading cards, which have become a staple in Japanese game centers.
2020-2023
The Covid-19 pandemic in 2020 up until 2023 caused many Japanese arcades to close down

== See also ==
- Arcade game
- Golden age of arcade video games
- List of highest-grossing arcade video games
- Video arcade
