= José Rafael Marcano =

Venezuelan engineer and videogame developer

- Education: Universidad Metropolitana; International Computing School
- Occupations: Engineer, video game developer
- Website: kabutocoder.com

José Rafael Marcano Santelli is a Venezuelan engineer and videogame developer.

== First years and education ==
José Rafael discovered programming at the age of eleven and has stated that by that time he decided that it was the profession he wanted to pursue. His first video game console was an Atari 2600 in the late 1970s. He began studying with specialized books and magazines, as well as learning English, and started saving part of his allowance to buy a computer. His parents decided to make up the rest of the price to buy an 8-bit Sinclair. Later he was able to acquire a 16k memory computer and with them he learned to program in BASIC.

He began studying systems engineering at the Universidad Metropolitana in Caracas, culminating his studies at the International Computing School, in the Chacao municipality.

== Career ==
In 1995 he founded the Mediatech videogame studio with three partners, a project he had always wanted to carry out, and in 1996 he launched the educational videogame series "Las aventuras de Umi", which included the 1999 title "Umi en la selva". At the time, Mediatech was one of only two or three video game developers in Latin America, and Las aventuras de Umi sold more than 350,000 copies, a very successful release. The studio also worked with the Children's Museum of Caracas, for which more than ten advergames were developed. The first exhibit worked on was Biomes, for the Ecology area of the Museum. According to Marcano, Mediatech's contact with the Museum was kept between 1994 and 2014, and the company developed at least 80% of the interactive kiosks in the institution.

In 1999, José Rafael obtained authorization to develop Mazinger Z video games on PCs from Gō Nagai, the creator of the franchise, during a visit of the mangaka to Caracas. After the authorization, the videogames "Mazinger versus Big Mazinger", in 2001, and "Mazinger Z saves Venezuela", in 2004, were released.

In 2015, José Rafael migrated with his family to Bogotá, Colombia.
