= Nordcurrent =

Lithuanian video game developer and publisher

- Formerly: Ivolgamus
- Type: Private
- Industry: Video games
- Founded: 2002
- Headquarters: Vilnius, Lithuania
- Key people: Victoria Trofimova (CEO)
- Products: 101-in-1 Games, Happy Chef, Cooking Fever
- Number of employees: 218(2024)
- Subsidiaries: Nordcurrent Odesa
- Website: www.nordcurrent.com

Nordcurrent is a Lithuanian video game development and publishing company headquartered in Vilnius, Lithuania. It has development studios in Vilnius (Lithuania), Dnipro (Ukraine), Warsaw (Poland) and Gothenburg (Sweden). Nordcurrent develops and publishes casual and freemium games for smartphones, tablets and PC/Mac.

== History ==
Nordcurrent has been operating since 2002 when Ivolgamus, a company developing games for consoles, was established in Vilnius by two brothers Sergej and Michail Trofimov and Michail's wife Victoria.

The company worked for a while as a developer in the console business, mostly known for cooperation with Activision. In 2007, they grew rapidly and achieved success with the Shrek and Barbie games, which were developed for Activision. In 2008, Nordcurrent started publishing independently to take advantage of the opportunities available on the global market. Since 2010, Nordcurrent has specialised in the development of freemium and casual games.

The company changed its name to Nordcurrent. The first big hit created by the company was 101-in-1 Games for the iOS platform and it has reached top 5 games in 75 countries. The game reached 20 million downloads by 2014.

In August 2014, the iOS game Cooking Fever was released. In February 2015, it was released for Android. In the first year Cooking Fever was downloaded by more than 50 million players. In November 2015, Nordcurrent opened a new development studio in Warsaw, Poland.

One of company’s most popular games, Sniper Arena, was released in 2016 and has 50 million downloads worldwide.

In 2018, Nordcurrent acquired Odesa (Ukraine) game studio Blam! Games Studio which then was renamed to Nordcurrent Odesa. Also, in October 2018, Nordcurrent released Murder in the Alps, having over 10 million downloads.

Over the next three years, Nordcurrent has released several new games – Airplane Chefs (2020), Pocket Styler (2020), Happy Clinic (2020), Ocean’s Heart (2021), and Murder by Choice (2021).

Nordcurrent continues to expand with the acquisition of RinGames, based in Dnipro, Ukraine. The acquired company has 28 employees and 10 years of experience in the computer games industry. RinGames was previously known as the strongest game graphics team in Ukraine.

The company is a member of the Lithuanian Game Developers Association - an organisation of professional and amateur game developers in all fields.

Since 2002, Nordcurrent has developed more than 50 games that have attracted more than half a billion players worldwide.

In November 2023, Nordcurrent acquired Swedish game developer River End Games.

== Awards ==
In 2015, Cooking Fever was awarded as the game of the year by LT Game Awards.

In 2017, Nordcurrent co-founders Victoria, Michail and Sergej Trofimov were awarded for their services to the Lithuanian games industry by the LT Game Awards.

In 2018, Norcurrent released Murder in the Alps, which was awarded in the LT Game Awards as best game in several nominations: best sound design, best game for smart devices and the best game of the year.

In 2021, the company’s game Airplane Chefs in LT Game Awards was nominated for best sound design and best game for smart devices categories.

In 2023, Murder by Choice won the best narrative for a mobile game in the NYX Game Awards. It was also nominated for game of the year, best mobile game, and best art direction categories in the LT Game Awards.

== Games published ==
| Year | Title | Platform(s) | Description |
|---|---|---|---|
| 2008 | 101-in-1 Explosive Megamix | Nintendo DS, WiiWare | DS version was released in 2008, WiiWare version was released in 2011. A collection of 101 minigames, such as Snake, Sudoku, and Jigsaw. |
| 2008 | Shrek’s Carnival Craze | Microsoft Windows, Nintendo DS, PlayStation 2, Wii | Shrek's Carnival Craze is a collection of carnival mini-games themed after the Shrek franchise. |
| 2009 | 101-in-1 Party Megamix | Wii | |
| 2010 | 101-in-1 Games | Android, iOS | 101-in-1 Games is an app to play more than 140 different games using a single interface: some of them are unlocked from the beginning, while others have to be unlocked with coins. |
| 2010 | 101-in-1 Megamix | PlayStation Portable | |
| 2010 | 5 Arcade Gems | Wii | 5 Arcade Gems is a collection of five arcade games. It is for up to 4 players. Each game is different in visuals, theme and gameplay mechanics. |
| 2010 | Arcade Essentials | PlayStation Portable, PlayStation 3, Wii | Arcade Essentials is a collection of five classic arcade games. All games are presented in a modern redesign, with updated gameplay, graphics and sound effects. |
| 2010 | Urbanix | iOS, PlayStation Portable, Wii | Urbanix is a game inspired by classic computer games. The player takes control of Urbanix, a small tractor that has to build a town on an empty field, avoid enemies and catch and chase house crashers. The game can be played on Earth, in the North Pole, or on the moon - all locations have different gameplay mechanics, therefore the strategy of the game has to be adapted. |
| 2010 | Jewel Keepers: Easter Island | iOS, macOS, Microsoft Windows | Jewel Keepers: Easter Island is a match-3 game where you travel around Easter Island and solve its mysteries. |
| 2012 | Jewels of East India Company | Android, iOS | Jewels of East India Company is a match-3 game set in East India at the beginning of the 19th century. |
| 2012 | Happy Chef | Android, iOS, macOS, Microsoft Windows | Happy Chef is a time management cooking game. |
| 2013 | Happy Chef 2 | Android, iOS, macOS, Microsoft Windows | Happy Chef 2 is the sequel to Happy Chef now involving different countries. |
| 2013 | The Curse of the Werewolves | Android, iOS, Microsoft Windows | The Curse of the Werewolves is a hidden object adventure game. |
| 2014 | Cooking Fever | Android, iOS, Microsoft Windows | Cooking Fever is a cooking game where players manage different types of cuisine restaurants. Players have to serve their customers as quickly as possible. The restaurant can be decorated to attract more clients and there are more than 100 levels to complete. |
| 2014 | Gamebanjo | Android, iOS | Gamebanjo is a free compilation of 26 most popular stand-alone games in one app. |
| 2015 | Building the China Wall | Android, iOS | Building the China Wall is a time management game where you help build the Great Wall of China. |
| 2016 | Building The Great Wall of China 2 | Android, iOS | Building the China Wall 2 is the sequel to Building the China Wall. |
| 2016 | Sky Crew | macOS, Microsoft Windows | Sky Crew is a time management game where you play as a flight attendant. |
| 2016 | Sniper Arena | Android, iOS | Sniper Arena is an action PvP shooting game. A multiplayer first-person shooter is faced off against other snipers in closed settings. Each player controls a sniper positioned in a random spot in the level. The objective is to shoot as many enemies as possible. |
| 2017 | Pirate Chronicles | Android, iOS | Pirate Chronicles is a time management game where you defeat pirates. |
| 2017 | Happy Clinic | Android, iOS, macOS, Microsoft Windows | Happy Clinic is a time management game where you manage doctors to take care of patients in hospitals around the world. |
| 2017 | Happy Cafe | Android, iOS | Happy Cafe is a time management game where you grow fresh ingredients on your organic farm and cook hundreds of dishes from all around the world in an expanding cafe. |
| 2018 | Make it Big in Hollywood | Android, iOS | Make it Big in Hollywood is a time management game where you run a movie studio in Hollywood. |
| 2018 | Murder in the Alps | Android, iOS, Microsoft Windows | Murder in the Alps is an interactive crime novel with Hidden Object gameplay features. The game is set in the 1930s. |
| 2019 | Time Guardians | Android, iOS | Time Guardians is set in a mysterious world with hidden object scenes for players to explore. |
| 2020 | Matchland Quest | Android, iOS | Matchland Quest is a match-3 game where you reclaim the land from the villainous Lord Eavel. |
| 2020 | Bake a Cake | Android, iOS | Bake a Cake is a match-3 game where you travel around the world opening dessert shops along the way. |
| 2020 | Airplane Chefs | Android, iOS, Microsoft Windows | Airplane Chefs is a time-management game in which players cook meals and desserts on a commercial flight. |
| 2020 | Pocket Styler | Android, iOS | Pocket Styler is a casual fashion and dressing up game. Players can dress up characters according to the events they plan to attend. |
| 2021 | Murder by Choice | Android, iOS | Murder by Choice is an interactive murder mystery, hidden object game. It is set in the present day where the player's choices impact how the story plays out. |
| 2021 | Ocean’s Heart | Microsoft Windows, Nintendo Switch | Ocean's Heart is a top-down action RPG in which the player explores an archipelago as a young woman named Tilia. Players must take on contracts to fight monsters, explore ancient dungeons, and unravel the mystery of Ocean's Heart. |
| 2022 | Decision: Red Daze | Microsoft Windows | Decision: Red Daze is an action RPG taking place in an apocalyptic world. |
| 2022 | War Sector | Android, iOS | WAR SECTOR is a 5v5 multiplayer online battle arena with real-time PvP team fights. |
| 2023 | Greedventory | Microsoft Windows | Greedventory is a pixel-art linear action RPG in a magical world. |
| 2023 | Cooking Fever Duels | Android, iOS | Cooking Fever Duels is a PvP time-management game with real-time online matches where players' cooking skills compete with each other. |
| 2024 | Fireside | Microsoft Windows, Nintendo Switch | Uplifting narrative adventure about a journey, and the breaks that follow it. |
| 2024 | Go Home Annie | Microsoft Windows, PlayStation 5, Xbox Series X/S | Solve puzzles, converse with anomalous entities and explore multiple paths in this first-person horror adventure |
| 2025 | Chains of Freedom | Microsoft Windows, PlayStation 4, PlayStation 5, Xbox Series X/S | Step into a thrilling turn-based tactics game set in a fictional, dystopian Eastern European state. Lead an elite military squad as you navigate perilous missions filled with danger, deceit, and moral dilemmas. |
| 2025 | Eriksholm: The Stolen Dream | Microsoft Windows, PlayStation 5, Xbox Series X/S, Nintendo Switch 2 | Experience an isometric, narrative-driven stealth game and join Hannah’s adventure in the vibrant city of Eriksholm |
| 2025 | I Am Machine | Microsoft Windows | Fight through a machine-ruled world in this isometric rogue-lite adventure. |
| 2026 | Defender of the Crown: The Legend Returns | Microsoft Windows, Nintendo Switch, PlayStation 5, Xbox Series X/S | Conquer territories, raise armies, storm castles, influence the balance of power, and rise above rival lords to unite the kingdom under your banner. |
