= List of video games released in 2025 =

The following is a comprehensive index of all games released in 2025, sorted chronologically by release date, and divided by quarter. Information regarding developer, publisher, operating system, genre and type of release is provided where available

For a summary of 2025 in video games as a whole, see 2025 in video games.

== Legend ==
Video game platforms
ATRVCS	Atari VCS	DROID	Android	iOS	iOS, iPhone, iPod, iPadOS, iPad, visionOS, Apple Vision Pro
LIN	Linux, SteamOS	NS	Nintendo Switch	NS2	Nintendo Switch 2
OSX	macOS	PS4	PlayStation 4	PS5	PlayStation 5
Quest	Meta Quest / Oculus Quest family, including Oculus Rift	WIN	Windows, all versions Windows 95 and up	XBO	Xbox One
XBX/S	Xbox Series X/S				

Types of releases
Compilation	A compilation, anthology or collection of several titles, usually (but not always) belonging to the same series
Early access	A game launched in early access is unfinished and thus might contain bugs and glitches or have some of the content missing
Episodic	An episodic video game that is released in batches over a period of time
Expansion	A large-scale DLC to an already existing game that adds new story, areas and additions and/or changes to the game's mechanics
Full release	A full release of a game that launched in early access first
Limited	A special release (often called "Limited" or "Collector's Edition") with bonus collector's material. Often provided to people who pre-order a game
Port	The game first appeared on a different platform and a port was made. The game is like the original, with few or no differences
Remake	The game is an enhanced remake of an original, made using a new engine and/or assets and thus containing completely new sound, graphics and possibly changes to the story and/or gameplay
Remaster	The game is a remaster of an original, released on the same or different platform, with (usually minor) changes to graphics, sound and/or gameplay
Rerelease	The game was re-released on the same platform with no or only minor changes

Video game genres
Action	Action game	Action RPG	Action role-playing game	Action-adventure	Action-adventure game
Adventure	Adventure game	Battle royale	Battle royale game	Brawler	Beat 'em up
Bullet heaven	Vampire Survivors–like	Bullet hell	Bullet hell	Business sim	Business simulation game
City builder	City-building game	CMS	Construction and management simulation	Dating sim	Dating sim
DCCG	Digital collectible card game	Deck building	Deck building game	Dungeon crawl	Dungeon crawl
Farming	Farm life sim	Fighting	Fighting game	FPS	First-person shooter
Hack and slash	Hack and slash	Hero shooter	Hero shooter	Horror	Horror game
Interactive film	Interactive film	Life sim	Life simulation game	Metroidvania	Metroidvania
MMO	Massively multiplayer online game	MOBA	Multiplayer online battle arena	Monster tamer	Monster-taming game
Narrative adventure	Narrative adventure game	Otome	Otome game	Party	Party video game
PCA	Point-and-click adventure	Platformer	Platformer	Puzzle	Puzzle video game
Puzzle-platformer	Puzzle-platformer	Racing	Racing video game	Rhythm	Rhythm game
Roguelike	Roguelike, Roguelite	RPG	Role-playing video game	RTS	Real-time strategy
RTT	Real-time tactics	Run and gun	Run and gun game	Sandbox	Sandbox game
Scrolling shooter	Scrolling shooter	Shoot 'em up	Shoot 'em up	Simulation	Simulation video game
Social sim	Social simulation game	Soulslike	Soulslike	Sports	Sports video game
Stealth	Stealth game	Strategy	Strategy video game	Survival	Survival game
Survival horror	Survival horror	Tactical RPG	Tactical role-playing game	TBS	Turn-based strategy
TBT	Turn-based tactics	Tower defense	Tower defense	TPS	Third-person shooter
Vehicle sim	Vehicle simulation game	Visual novel	Visual novel	Walking sim	Walking simulator

== List ==
=== January–March ===
Release date	Title	Platform	Type	Genre	Developer	Publisher	Ref.
January 2	Wuthering Waves	PS5	Port	Action RPG	Kuro Games		
January 5	Amenti	WIN	Original	Horror, Walking sim	DarkPhobia Games		
January 7	Sea Fantasy	WIN	Original	Action RPG	METASLA		
January 7	Ys Memoire: The Oath in Felghana (WW)	NS, PS4, PS5	Remaster	Action RPG	Nihon Falcom	NA: Xseed Games; EU: Marvelous Europe	
January 8	The Exit 8	XBX/S	Port	Walking sim, Horror	Kotake Create	Playism	
January 9	The Fox's Way Home	NS	Port	Adventure	BeXide		
January 10	Freedom Wars Remastered	WIN, NS, PS4, PS5	Remaster	Action RPG	Dimps	Bandai Namco Entertainment	
January 14	Heroes of Hammerwatch 2	WIN	Port	Roguelike, Action RPG	Crackshell		
January 14	Hyper Light Breaker	WIN	Early access	Roguelike	Heart Machine	Arc Games	
January 14	Threefold Recital	WIN	Original	Narrative adventure, Visual novel	Everscape Games	indienova	
January 14	Turnip Boy Robs a Bank	iOS, DROID	Port	Action-adventure	Snoozy Kazoo	Plug In Digital	
January 15	Aloft	WIN	Early access	Survival, Sandbox	Astrolabe Interactive	Funcom	
January 15	Dragon Quest X Offline (JP)	iOS, DROID	Remake	RPG	B.B. Studio	Square Enix	
January 16	Blade Chimera	WIN, NS		Metroidvania	WSS Playground, Team Ladybug	WSS Playground, Playism	
January 16	Donkey Kong Country Returns HD	NS	Remaster	Platformer	Forever Entertainment	Nintendo	
January 16	DreadOut Remastered Collection	NS, PS5	Remaster, Compilation	Horror	Digital Happiness	Soft Source Publishing	
January 16	Doraemon Dorayaki Shop Story	PS4, XBO, XBX/S	Original	Simulation	Kairosoft		
January 16	Morkull Ragast's Rage	WIN, XBX/S	Port	Action, Platformer	Disaster Games	Selecta Play, Astrolabe Games	
January 16	Yobarai Detective: Miasma Breaker (JP)	NS	Original	Action RPG, Hack and slash	Mebius		
January 17	Dynasty Warriors: Origins	WIN, PS5, XBX/S	Original	Hack and slash, Action	Omega Force	Koei Tecmo	
January 17	Final Zone	NS	Port	Scrolling shooter (isometric)	Edia	Shinyuden, Ratalaika Games	
January 17	Tales of Graces f Remastered	WIN, NS, PS4, PS5, XBO, XBX/S	Remaster	RPG	Tose	Bandai Namco Entertainment	
January 20	The Curse of Mount Madre	WIN		RPG	Kevin Musto		
January 21	Dokapon! Sword of Fury (WW)	WIN		RPG	Sting Entertainment		
January 21	Needy Streamer Overload	PS4, PS5		Adventure, Visual novel	Xemono, WSS Playground	WSS Playground	
January 22	Ender Magnolia: Bloom in the Mist	WIN, NS, PS4, PS5, XBX/S	Full release	Metroidvania	Live Wire, Adglobe	Binary Haze Interactive	
January 22	Mika and the Witch's Mountain	WIN, NS, PS4, PS5, XBO, XBX/S	Full release	Adventure	Chibig, Nukefist	Chibig	
January 23	Achilles: Legends Untold	NS		Action RPG	Dark Point Games		
January 23	AI2U: With You 'Til The End	WIN	Early access	Horror (psych), Escape room	AlterStaff Inc.	AlterStaff Inc., Neverland Entertainment	
January 23	Final Fantasy VII Rebirth	WIN	Port	Action RPG	Square Enix		
January 23	Guilty Gear Strive	NS	Port	Fighting	Arc System Works		
January 23	Mercenaries Lament: Requiem of the Silver Wolf	WIN		Tactical RPG	RideonJapan, Esquadra	Flyhigh Works	
January 23	Ninja Gaiden II Black	WIN, PS5, XBX/S	Remaster	Action-adventure	Team Ninja	Koei Tecmo	
January 23	Party Animals	PS5	Port	Brawler, Party	Recreate Games	Source Technology	
January 23	Ravenswatch	NS	Port	Action, Roguelike	Passtech Games	Nacon	
January 23	Red Solstice 2: Survivors Ultimate Edition	PS4, PS5, XBO, XBX/S	Port	RTS	Ironward	505 Games	
January 23	Star Wars Episode I: Jedi Power Battles	WIN, NS, PS4, PS5, XBO, XBX/S	Remaster	Action	Aspyr		
January 23	Strania: The Stella Machina EX	NS	Port	Shoot 'em up	G.rev		
January 23	Sword of the Necromancer: Resurrection	WIN, NS, PS4, PS5, XBO, XBX/S	Remake	Action RPG	Grimorio of Games		
January 23	Synduality: Echo of Ada	WIN, PS5, XBX/S	Original	TPS	Game Studio	Bandai Namco Entertainment	
January 28	Botany Manor	PS4, PS5	Port	Puzzle, Adventure	Balloon Studios	Whitethorn Games	
January 28	Cuisineer	NS, PS5, XBX/S	Port	Action, Roguelike	BattleBrew Productions	NA: Xseed Games; EU: Marvelous Europe	
January 28	Eternal Strands	WIN, PS5, XBX/S		Action-adventure	Yellow Brick Games		
January 28	Neptunia Riders VS Dogoos (WW)	NS, PS4, PS5		Action	Compile Heart	Idea Factory International	
January 28	Orcs Must Die! Deathtrap	WIN, XBX/S	Original	Action, Tower defense	Robot Entertainment		
January 28	The Stone of Madness	WIN, NS, PS5, XBX/S	Original	RTS, Stealth	The Game Kitchen, Teku Studios	Tripwire Presents	
January 28	Tails of Iron II: Whiskers of Winter	WIN, OSX, LIN, NS, PS4, PS5, XBO, XBX/S		Action RPG, Adventure	Odd Bug Studio	United Label	
January 28	Virtua Fighter 5 R.E.V.O.	WIN	Remaster	Fighting	Ryu Ga Gotoku Studio	Sega	
January 29	Coridden	WIN	Original	Action RPG	Aftnareld	Anshar Publishing	
January 29	Cryptical Path	WIN	Original	Action, Roguelike	Old Skull Games		
January 29	Polaris	WIN	Original	TPS	Polaris Team	Variable State	
January 29	Turbo Overkill	NS, PS4, PS5, XBO, XBX/S	Port	FPS	Trigger Happy Interactive	Apogee Entertainment	
January 30	BattleCore Arena	WIN	Full release	TPS	Ubisoft Bordeaux, Cosmic Ray Studio	Ubisoft	
January 30	Cardfight!! Vanguard Dear Days 2	WIN, NS		DCCG	FuRyu	Bushiroad Games	
January 30	Gimmick! 2 (WW)	PS4, PS5, XBO, XBX/S	Port	Platformer	Bitwave Games	Sunsoft, Clear River Games	
January 30	Hello Kitty Island Adventure	WIN, NS	Port	Adventure	Sunblink		
January 30	Laika: Aged Through Blood	NS		Metroidvania	Brainwash Gang	Headup Games	
January 30	Accolade Sports Collection	WIN, NS, PS4, PS5, XBO, XBX/S	Compilation	Sports	QUByte Interactive	QUByte Interactive, Atari	
January 30	Marvel's Spider-Man 2	WIN	Port	Action-adventure	Insomniac Games, Nixxes Software	Sony Interactive Entertainment	
January 30	Phantom Brave: The Lost Hero	NS, PS4, PS5		Tactical RPG	Nippon Ichi Software	JP: Nippon Ichi Software; WW: NIS America	
January 30	Sniper Elite: Resistance	WIN, PS4, PS5, XBO, XBX/S		Tactical shooter	Rebellion Developments		
January 30	Techno Banter	WIN, NS, PS5, XBX/S		Adventure	Dexai Arts	Crunching Koalas	
January 30	Wizardry: The Five Ordeals	NS		RPG	59studio	Game*Spark Publishing	
January 31	Citizen Sleeper 2: Starward Vector	WIN, OSX, NS, PS5, XBX/S		RPG	Jump Over the Age	Fellow Traveller	
January 31	ReSetna	WIN, NS		Metroidvania, Action-adventure	Today's Games	indie.io	
January 31	Ridge Racer 64	NS	Port	Racing	Nintendo Software Technology	Nintendo	
February 4	Kingdom Come: Deliverance II	WIN, PS5, XBX/S	Original	Action RPG	Warhorse Studios	Deep Silver	
February 4	Marvel vs. Capcom Fighting Collection: Arcade Classics	XBO	Compilation	Fighting	Capcom, Eighting, Iron Galaxy	Capcom	
February 4	Rogue Waters	NS, PS5, XBX/S		Roguelike, Tactical RPG, TBT	Ice Code Games	Tripwire Presents	
February 5	Rift of the NecroDancer	WIN	Original	Rhythm	Brace Yourself Games, Tic Toc Games	Klei Publishing	
February 6	Big Helmet Heroes	WIN, NS, PS5, XBX/S		Action-adventure, Brawler	Exalted Studio	Dear Villagers	
February 6	Candy Crush Solitaire	iOS, DROID		Digital tabletop	King		
February 6	Momodora: Moonlit Farewell	NS, PS5, XBX/S		Metroidvania	Bombservice	Playism	
February 7	Macross Shooting Insight (WW)	NS, PS4, PS5		Shoot 'em up	Kaminari Games	Bushiroad Games, Red Art Games	
February 7	Sugoro Quest: Dice Heroes	NS, PS4, PS5, XBO, XBX/S		RPG	Ratalaika Games	Shinyuden, Ratalaika Games	
February 10	Medabots Survivors (JP)	iOS, DROID		Action, Roguelike	Imagineer		
February 11	Civilization VII	WIN, OSX, LIN, NS, PS4, PS5, XBO, XBX/S	Original	TBS, 4X	Firaxis Games	2K	
February 12	Warriors: Abyss	WIN, NS, PS4, PS5, XBO, XBX/S		Action, Roguelike	Omega Force	Koei Tecmo	
February 13	Amber Isle	NS		Business sim, Social sim	Ambertail Games	Team17	
February 13	Hyperdevotion Noire: Goddess Black Heart (JP)	NS		Tactical RPG	Compile Heart, Sting Entertainment	Compile Heart	
February 13	Metal Suits: Counter-Attack	WIN, NS, PS4, PS5, XBO, XBX/S		Run and gun	Eggtart		
February 13	Recall: Empty Wishes	WIN, NS, PS5, XBX/S		Narrative adventure	Puff Hook Studio	Dangen Entertainment	
February 13	Slime Heroes	WIN, NS, XBO, XBX/S		Action-adventure	Pancake Games	Whitethorn Games	
February 13	Snezhinka: Sentinel Girls 2	NS, PS5, XBX/S		Shoot 'em up (twin-stick)	hinyari9	Playism	
February 13	Urban Myth Dissolution Center	WIN, NS, PS5	Original	Adventure, Visual novel	Hakababunko	Shueisha Games	
February 13	Ultros	NS, XBX/S		Metroidvania, Action-adventure	Hadoque	Kepler Interactive	
February 14	The Legend of Heroes: Trails Through Daybreak II (WW)	WIN, NS, PS4, PS5		Action RPG	Nihon Falcom	NIS America	
February 14	Tomb Raider IV–VI Remastered	WIN, NS, PS4, PS5, XBO, XBX/S	Remaster, Compilation	Action-adventure	Aspyr		
February 14	Wario Land 4	NS	Port	Platformer	Nintendo R&D1	Nintendo	
February 17	SNØ: Ultimate Freeriding	WIN, OSX	Original	Sports (ski)	Studio Gauntlet		
February 18	Avowed	WIN, XBX/S	Original	Action RPG	Obsidian Entertainment	Xbox Game Studios	
February 18	Berserk Boy	PS5		Action, Platformer	BerserkBoy Games		
February 18	I Am Your Beast	iOS		FPS	Strange Scaffold		
February 18	Lost Records: Bloom & Rage Tape 1	WIN, PS5, XBX/S	Episode	Adventure	Don't Nod		
February 20	Cabernet	WIN, NS, PS4, PS5, XBO, XBX/S	Original	RPG	Party for Introverts	Akupara Games	
February 20	The King of Fighters XIII: Global Match	WIN		Fighting	Safari Games	SNK	
February 20	Godzilla Voxel Wars	NS		Strategy	Nukenin	Toho Games	
February 20	Piczle Cross: Rune Factory	WIN, NS		Puzzle	Score Studios	Rainy Frog	
February 20	Stories from Sol: The Gun-Dog	WIN, LIN, NS, PS4, PS5	Original	Visual novel	Space Colony Studios	Astrolabe Games, Meridiem Games	
February 20	Tribe Nine	WIN, OSX, iOS, DROID		Action RPG	Too Kyo Games	Akatsuki Games	
February 20	X-Out: Resurfaced	WIN, NS, PS5, XBX/S	Remake	Shoot 'em up	Kritzelkratz 3000, Rainbow Arts	ININ Games	
February 21	Like a Dragon: Pirate Yakuza in Hawaii	WIN, PS4, PS5, XBO, XBX/S	Original	Action-adventure	Ryu Ga Gotoku Studio	Sega	
February 21	Whisker Squadron: Survivor	WIN, PS5	Full release	Shoot 'em up (rail), Roguelike	Flippfly		
February 24	Sayonara Wild Hearts	PS5		Action, Rhythm	Simogo	Annapurna Interactive	
February 25	Ninja Five-O	WIN, NS, PS4, PS5		Action, Platformer	Konami	Limited Run Games	
February 26	Biomorph	XBX/S	Port	Soulslike, Metroidvania	Lucid Dreams Studio		
February 27	Cladun X3 (JP)	NS, PS4, PS5		Action RPG	Nippon Ichi Software		
February 27	Crowns and Pawns: Kingdom of Deceit	PS4, PS5, XBO, XBX/S		PCA	Tag of Joy	Headup Games	
February 27	Crystar (JP)	PS5		Action RPG	Gemdrops	FuRyu	
February 27	Fuyuzono Sacrifice (JP)	NS		Otome, Visual novel	Otomate	Idea Factory	
February 27	Glover	NS, PS4, PS5, XBO, XBX/S	Port	Puzzle-platformer	Piko Interactive	QUByte Interactive, Bleem!	
February 27	Okayu Nyumu! (JP)	WIN, NS, PS4		Visual novel	Entergram		
February 27	Utawarerumono Trilogy Set (JP)	NS	Compilation	Visual novel	Aquaplus		
February 27	Yu-Gi-Oh! Early Days Collection	WIN, NS	Compilation	DCCG	Digital Eclipse	Konami Digital Entertainment	
February 28	Monster Hunter Wilds	WIN, PS5, XBX/S	Original	Action RPG	Capcom		
February 28	PGA Tour 2K25	WIN, PS5, XBX/S	Original	Sports	HB Studios	2K	
February 28	Justice Ninja Casey (WW)	WIN, NS, PS4, PS5, XBX/S		Action-adventure	Ratalaika Games, Sunsoft	Shinyuden, Sunsoft	
February 28	Omega 6: The Triangle Stars (WW)	WIN, NS		Visual novel, Adventure	Happymeal, Pleocene	Clear River Games, City Connection	
February 28	Turok	PS5, XBX/S	Port	FPS	Nightdive Studios		
March 4	Age of Mythology: Retold	PS5	Remaster	RTS	World's Edge, Forgotten Empires, Tantalus Media	Xbox Game Studios	
March 4	Carmen Sandiego	WIN, NS, PS4, PS5, XBO, XBX/S, iOS, DROID	Original	Puzzle, Adventure	Gameloft		
March 4	Everhood 2	WIN, NS	Original	Adventure, RPG, Rhythm	Chris Nordgren, Jordi Roca	Foreign Gnomes	
March 4	Knights in Tight Spaces	WIN		Deck building (roguelike)	Ground Shatter	Raw Fury	
March 4	Two Point Museum	WIN, OSX, LIN, PS5, XBX/S		Business sim	Two Point Studios	Sega	
March 4	War Robots: Frontiers	WIN, PS4, PS5, XBO, XBX/S	Full release	TPS	Pixonic	My.Games	
March 5	Air (WW)	WIN		Visual novel	Key	Visual Arts	
March 6	Despera Drops (WW)	NS		Visual novel	D3 Publisher, Red Entertainment	Aksys Games	
March 6	Ever 17: The Out of Infinity	WIN, NS, PS4		Visual novel	Mages	Mages, Spike Chunsoft	
March 6	FragPunk	WIN		FPS, Hero shooter	Bad Guitar Studio	NetEase Games	
March 6	Go Fight Fantastic!	NS, PS4, PS5		Hack and slash	Dinomite Games	Kinda Brave	
March 6	MainFrames	WIN, NS		Platformer	Assoupi	The Arcade Crew	
March 6	Never 7: The End of Infinity	WIN, NS, PS4		Visual novel	Mages	Mages, Spike Chunsoft	
March 6	Sorry We're Closed	NS, PS4, PS5, XBO, XBX/S		Survival horror	à la mode games	Akupara Games	
March 6	Split Fiction	WIN, PS5, XBX/S	Original	Action-adventure	Hazelight Studios	Electronic Arts	
March 6	Suikoden I & II HD Remaster: Gate Rune and Dunan Unification Wars	WIN, NS, PS4, PS5, XBO, XBX/S	Remaster, Compilation	Tactical RPG	Konami Digital Entertainment		
March 6	Wizardry Variants Daphne	WIN		RPG	Studio 2PRO	Drecom	
March 7	Donkey Kong (Game Boy)	NS	Port	Puzzle-platformer	Nintendo, Pax Softnica	Nintendo	
March 7	Mario's Picross	NS	Port	Puzzle	Jupiter, Ape Inc.	Nintendo	
March 7	Monochrome Echoes: White	WIN	Early access	RPG	Thousand Games	mebius	
March 10	The New Denpa Men	iOS, DROID	Port	RPG	Genius Sonority		
March 10	Oaths of Light – Chapter I	WIN		Action-adventure, RPG	ASM-Games		
March 11	Centum	WIN, OSX, NS, PS4, PS5, XBO, XBX/S		PCA	Hack The Publisher	Serenity Forge	
March 11	Maliki: Poison of the Past	WIN, NS		RPG	Blue Banshee	Ankama	
March 11	Rise of the Rōnin	WIN	Port	Action RPG	Team Ninja	Koei Tecmo	
March 11	Wanderstop	WIN, PS5, XBX/S	Original	Life sim, Adventure	Ivy Road	Annapurna Interactive	
March 12	Fate: Reawakened	WIN, NS, PS4, PS5, XBO, XBX/S	Remaster, Compilation	Action RPG	gamigo, Tableflip Entertainment	gamigo, WildTangent	
March 12	Metal Bringer	WIN, PS5		Roguelike, Action	Alphawing	Playism	
March 12	Wind Breaker: Rebel Heroes (JP)	WIN, iOS, DROID		RPG	Team Caravan	Kodansha	
March 13	Asylum	WIN, OSX, LIN	Original	Adventure, Horror	Senscape		
March 13	BEAST: Bio Exo Arena Suit Team	NS		Third-person hero shooter	Oh BiBi		
March 13	Beyond the Ice Palace II	WIN, NS, PS4, PS5, XBO, XBX/S		Action, Platformer	Storybird Studio	PQube, PixelHeart	
March 13	Castle of Shikigami 3 (WW)	WIN		Bullet hell	Alfa System, Cosmo Machia	Cosmo Machia	
March 13	Dungeons of Hinterberg	PS4, PS5		Action RPG, Social sim	Microbird	Curve Games	
March 13	The Hungry Lamb: Traveling in the Late Ming Dynasty	NS	Port	Visual novel	Zerocreation Games	Zerocreation Games, 2P Games	
March 13	Is It Wrong to Try to Pick Up Girls in a Dungeon?: Fullland of Water and Light	WIN, NS		Action RPG	Bushiroad Games		
March 13	Kamitsubaki City Regenerate	WIN, NS		Visual novel	Kamitsubaki Studio, Orange	Kamitsubaki Studio	
March 13	Mullet MadJack	XBO, XBX/S		Roguelike, FPS	Hammer95		
March 13	On Your Tail	NS		Adventure, Life sim	Memorable Games	Humble Games	
March 13	P-47 II MD (JP)	GEN		Scrolling shooter (horizontal)	City Connection		
March 14	Kaleidoscope of Phantom Prison II (JP)	NS, PS4		Visual novel	07th Expansion	Entergram	
March 14	Phantom Thief Angels: Twin Angel – Labyrinth of Time and World – Re:light	WIN, OSX		Visual novel	Alterciws		
March 14	WWE 2K25	WIN, PS4, PS5, XBO, XBX/S	Original	Sports	Visual Concepts	2K	
March 18	Gakuen Idolmaster (JP)	WIN		Raising sim	QualiArts	Bandai Namco Entertainment, DMM Games	
March 18	MLB The Show 25	NS, PS5, XBX/S	Original	Sports	San Diego Studio	Sony Interactive Entertainment, MLB Advanced Media	
March 18	MySims: Cozy Bundle	WIN		Life sim	Maxis	Electronic Arts	
March 19	KinnikuNeko: Super Muscle Cat	NS, PS4, PS5, XBO, XBX/S		Platformer	Kamotachi	Mameshiba Games	
March 20	Assassin's Creed Shadows	WIN, OSX, PS5, XBX/S	Original	Action-adventure, Stealth	Ubisoft Quebec	Ubisoft	
March 20	Cataclismo	WIN	Full release	RTS, Tower defense	Digital Sun	Hooded Horse	
March 20	Rendering Ranger: R² [Rewind]	WIN, NS, PS4, PS5	Remaster	Action	Limited Run Games, Rainbow Arts	Ziggurat Interactive	
March 20	RollerCoaster Tycoon 3: Complete Edition	PS4, PS5, XBO, XBX/S	Remaster	CMS	Frontier Developments	Atari	
March 20	Xenoblade Chronicles X: Definitive Edition	NS	Remaster	Action RPG	Monolith Soft	Nintendo	
March 21	Atelier Yumia: The Alchemist of Memories & the Envisioned Land	WIN, NS, PS4, PS5, XBO, XBX/S	Original	Action RPG	Gust	Koei Tecmo	
March 21	Bleach: Rebirth of Souls	WIN, PS4, PS5, XBX/S		Fighting, Action	Tamsoft	Bandai Namco Entertainment	
March 21	Look Outside	WIN	Original	RPG, Survival horror	Francis Coulombe	Devolver Digital	
March 23	Redemption of Liuyin	WIN, PS5, XBX/S		Soulslike	KingnaGame		
March 24	Dark Deity 2	WIN, OSX		Tactical RPG	Sword & Axe	indie.io	
March 24	Oblitus mortis	WIN, OSX, LIN		Metroidvania	Oblitus mortis		
March 24	Schedule I	WIN	Early access	Simulation	TVGS		
March 25	Breakout Beyond	WIN, NS, PS4, PS5, XBO, XBX/S, ATRVCS		Action	Choice Provisions	Atari	
March 25	Steel Paws	iOS, DROID		Action-adventure	Ys Net	Netflix Games	
March 26	Grit & Valor: 1949	WIN		Roguelike, RTS	Milky Tea	Megabit	
March 26	Mother Machine	WIN		Action, Platformer	Maschinen-Mensch		
March 27	AI Limit	WIN, PS5		Action RPG	SenseGames	CE-Asia	
March 27	Atomfall	WIN, PS4, PS5, XBO, XBX/S	Original	Survival, Action	Rebellion Developments		
March 27	Backyard Baseball '97	iOS, DROID	Port	Sports	Mega Cat Studios	Playground Productions	
March 27	Blue Wednesday	NS, PS4, PS5, XBO, XBX/S		Adventure	Buff Studio	Forever Entertainment	
March 27	Bubble Ghost Remake	WIN, NS, PS5	Remake	Puzzle-platformer, Action-adventure	Nakama Game Studio	Selecta Play	
March 27	Dynamic Chord feat. [rêve parfait] Remaster edition (JP)	NS	Remaster	Visual novel	Honeybee Black	Dramatic Create	
March 27	ENA: Dream BBQ	WIN, OSX, LIN	Episode	Adventure	ENA Team	Joel G	
March 27	The First Berserker: Khazan	WIN, PS5, XBX/S		Action RPG	Neople	Nexon	
March 27	Fuuraiki (JP)	WIN		Adventure	Nippon Ichi Software, FOG	Nippon Ichi Software	
March 27	Gal Guardians: Servants of the Dark	WIN, NS, PS4, PS5	Original	Metroidvania, Action-adventure	Inti Creates		
March 27	I Have No Mouth, and I Must Scream	NS, PS4, PS5, XBO, XBX/S	Port	PCA, Horror	The Dreamers Guild	Nightdive Studios	
March 27	Instruments of Destruction	PS5, XBX/S		Simulation	Radiangames		
March 27	Karma: The Dark World	WIN, PS5		Horror (psych)	Pollard Studio	Wired Productions, Gamera Games	
March 27	Mabinogi Mobile	WIN, iOS, DROID	Original	MMORPG	DevCAT	Nexon	
March 27	Project:;COLD case.mirage (JP)	WIN, NS		Adventure	D.A.G	Bandai Namco Entertainment	
March 27	Puella Magi Madoka Magica: Magia Exedra	iOS, DROID		RPG	Pokelabo, f4samurai	Aniplex	
March 27	Rift of the NecroDancer	NS	Port	Rhythm	Brace Yourself Games, Tic Toc Games	Klei Publishing	
March 27	SaGa Frontier 2 Remastered	WIN, NS, PS4, PS5, iOS, DROID	Remaster	RPG	Square Enix, Bullets	Square Enix	
March 27	Sanrio Characters Miracle Match: Magical Onigokko (JP)	NS		Action	Imagineer		
March 27	Setsuna ni Kakeru Koi Hanabi (JP)	NS, PS4		Visual novel	CRYSTALiA	Entergram	
March 27	Tayutama: Kiss on my Deity	WIN, NS		Visual novel	Frontier Works, Lump of Sugar	kawaiinium	
March 27	Venus Vacation Prism: Dead or Alive Xtreme (JP/AS)	WIN, PS4, PS5		Adventure, Dating sim	Team Ninja	Koei Tecmo	
March 27	Which Way Up: Galaxy Games	WIN, NS		Party	Turtle Flip Studio		
March 27	Winning Post 10 2025 (JP)	WIN, NS, PS4, PS5		Sports, Simulation	Koei Tecmo		
March 28	Dollhouse: Behind The Broken Mirror	WIN, PS5, XBX/S		Horror, Adventure	Indigo Studios, Grindstone	Soedesco	

=== April–June ===
Release date	Title	Platform	Type	Genre	Developer	Publisher	Ref.
April 1	Koira	WIN, PS5		Adventure	Studio Tolima	Don't Nod	
April 2	Croc: Legend of the Gobbos	WIN, NS, PS4, PS5, XBO, XBX/S	Remaster	Platformer	Argonaut Games		
April 2	Elroy and the Aliens	WIN, OSX, LIN		PCA	Motiviti		
April 3	Lonestar	WIN		Roguelike	Math Tide	Thermite Games	
April 3	The Last of Us Part II Remastered	WIN	Remaster	Action-adventure, Survival horror	Naughty Dog	Sony Interactive Entertainment	
April 4	A Space for the Unbound	iOS		Adventure	Mojiken Studio	Toge Productions, Chorus Worldwide	
April 4	Feudal Bros: Tonosama #1	WIN, NS, PS4, PS5, XBO, XBX/S		Brawler	Sunsoft	Ratalaika Games, Shinyuden	
April 4	Tetris: The Grand Master 4 – Absolute Eye	WIN	Original	Puzzle	Arika		
April 8	Battlefield Waltz (WW)	NS		Otome, Visual novel	Otomate	Idea Factory International	
April 8	Ixion	PS5, XBX/S		City builder, Survival	Bulwark Studios	Kasedo Games	
April 8	South of Midnight	WIN, XBX/S	Original	Action-adventure	Compulsion Games	Xbox Game Studios	
April 9	Commandos: Origins	WIN, PS5, XBX/S		RTT	Claymore Game Studios	Kalypso Media	
April 9	Into the Dead: Our Darkest Days	WIN, OSX	Early access	Survival	PikPok		
April 10	All in Abyss: Judge the Fake	WIN, NS, PS5		Adventure, RPG	Acquire, WSS Playground	Alliance Arts	
April 10	ACA NeoGeo Selection Vol. 3 (JP)	NS	Compilation	—N/a	Hamster Corporation, SNK	SNK	
April 10	ACA NeoGeo Selection Vol. 4 (JP)	NS	Compilation	—N/a	Hamster Corporation, SNK	SNK	
April 10	Blue Prince	WIN, PS5, XBX/S	Original	Puzzle, Adventure	Dogubomb	Raw Fury	
April 10	Crashlands 2	WIN, iOS, DROID		Survival, Action RPG	Butterscotch Shenanigans		
April 10	Memories Off Sousou: Not always true (JP/AS)	WIN, NS, PS4, PS5		Visual novel	Mages		
April 10	Monaco 2	WIN, PS5, XBX/S	Original	Stealth, Action	Pocketwatch Games	Humble Games	
April 10	Ninja Hayate HD Remaster	WIN	Remaster	Interactive film	Taito		
April 10	Pilo and the Holobook	WIN, NS, PS4, PS5, XBO, XBX/S		Adventure	Mudita Games	Red Deer Games	
April 10	Pocket Bravery	NS, PS4, PS5, XBO, XBX/S		Fighting	Statera Studio	PQube	
April 10	Progress Orders (JP)	WIN, NS		RPG	Hakama	Bushiroad Games	
April 10	Promise Mascot Agency	WIN, NS, PS4, PS5, XBO, XBX/S		Adventure, Simulation	Kaizen Game Works		
April 10	Snow Bros. 2 Special	WIN, NS	Remake	Platformer	CRT Games	Gravity Game Arise	
April 10	Star Overdrive	NS		Action-adventure	Caracal Games	Dear Villagers	
April 10	The Talos Principle: Reawakened	WIN, PS5, XBX/S	Remaster	Puzzle	Croteam	Devolver Digital	
April 10	Time Gal HD Remaster	WIN	Remaster	Interactive film	Taito		
April 14	Forever Skies	WIN, PS5	Full release	Survival, Action-adventure	Far From Home		
April 14	Warside	WIN, LIN		TBT	LAVABIRD	First Break Labs	
April 15	Chains of Freedom	WIN, PS4, PS5, XBO, XBX/S		TBS	Nordcurrent	Nordcurrent Labs	
April 15	Lost Records: Bloom & Rage Tape 2	WIN, PS5, XBX/S	Episode	Adventure	Don't Nod		
April 15	Monument Valley	NS, PS4, PS5, XBO, XBX/S	Port	Puzzle	Ustwo Games		
April 15	Monument Valley 2	NS, PS4, PS5, XBO, XBX/S	Port	Puzzle	Ustwo Games		
April 16	Touhou Danmaku Kagura: Phantasia Lost	PS4		Rhythm	Unknown X	Alliance Arts	
April 16	SD Gundam G Generation Eternal	iOS, DROID		Tactical RPG	Bandai Namco Entertainment		
April 17	Bionic Bay	WIN, PS5		Action, Platformer	Mureena, Psychoflow	Kepler Interactive	
April 17	I, Robot	WIN, NS, PS4, PS5, XBO, XBX/S, ATRVCS	Remake	Shoot 'em up	Llamasoft	Atari	
April 17	Indiana Jones and the Great Circle	PS5	Port	Action-adventure	MachineGames	Bethesda Softworks	
April 17	Mandragora: Whispers of the Witch Tree	WIN, NS, PS5, XBX/S		Action RPG	Primal Game Studio	Knights Peak	
April 17	Neighbors: Suburban Warfare	WIN	Early access	FPS	Invisible Walls		
April 17	Over Requiemz (JP)	NS		Otome, Visual novel	Kogado Studio, Otomate	Idea Factory	
April 17	Phantom Breaker: Battle Grounds Ultimate	WIN, NS, PS4, PS5, XBO, XBX/S		Brawler	Rocket Panda Games		
April 17	Rusty Rabbit	WIN, NS, PS5		Metroidvania, Action-adventure	Nitroplus	NetEase Games	
April 17	Tempest Rising	WIN		RTS	Slipgate Ironworks, 2B Games	Knights Peak, 3D Realms	
April 17	Tempopo	WIN, OSX, LIN, NS, XBO, XBX/S		Puzzle	Witch Beam	Cult Games	
April 18	Jaleco Sports: Bases Loaded	WIN		Sports	Sickhead Games, Jaleco	Rock It Games	
April 18	Lunar Remastered Collection	WIN, NS, PS4, XBO	Remaster, Compilation	RPG	Game Arts, GungHo Online Entertainment	GungHo Online Entertainment	
April 21	Shantae Advance: Risky Revolution	GBA	Original	Metroidvania, Action-adventure	WayForward	Limited Run Games	
April 22	The Elder Scrolls IV: Oblivion Remastered	WIN, PS5, XBX/S	Remaster	Action RPG	Virtuos, Bethesda Game Studios	Bethesda Softworks	
April 22	Fire Emblem: The Sacred Stones	NS	Port	Tactical RPG	Intelligent Systems	Nintendo	
April 22	Post Trauma	WIN, PS5, XBX/S		Survival horror	Red Soul Games	Raw Fury	
April 22	Steel Seed	WIN, PS5, XBX/S		Action-adventure, Stealth	Storm in a Teacup	ESDigital Games	
April 23	Beholder: Conductor	WIN, OSX		Simulation	Alawar		
April 23	Sunderfolk	WIN, NS, PS5, XBX/S		TBT, Adventure	Secret Door	Dreamhaven	
April 23	Those Games Extreme	WIN, NS, PS4, PS5		Puzzle, Casual	Monkeycraft	D3 Publisher	
April 24	Amerzone: The Explorer's Legacy	WIN, PS5, XBX/S		Adventure	Microids Studio Paris	Microids	
April 24	Asura the Striker	WIN		Shoot 'em up	LeftOver		
April 24	Bokura: Planet	WIN, OSX		Puzzle, Action-adventure	Tokoronyori	Kodansha	
April 24	BrokenLore: Don't Watch	WIN		Horror (psych)	Serafini Productions	Shochiku	
April 24	Clair Obscur: Expedition 33	WIN, PS5, XBX/S	Original	RPG	Sandfall Interactive	Kepler Interactive	
April 24	Dolls Nest	WIN		Action	Nitroplus, Nitro Arts	Nitroplus	
April 24	Dreamy Syrup	WIN, NS		Visual novel	Rabbitfoot		
April 24	Fatal Fury: City of the Wolves	WIN, PS4, PS5, XBX/S	Original	Fighting	SNK		
April 24	G-Mode Archives+: Shin Megami Tensei: 20XX (JP)	NS		RPG	Atlus	G-Mode	
April 24	The Hundred Line: Last Defense Academy	WIN, NS	Original	Tactical RPG, Adventure	Too Kyo Games, Media.Vision	JP: Aniplex; WW: Xseed Games	
April 24	Love Live! Nijigasaki High School Idol Club: TOKIMEKI Roadmap to the Future	WIN, NS		Visual novel	HuneX	Bushiroad Games	
April 24	Monochrome Echoes: White	WIN	Full release	RPG	Thousand Games	mebius	
April 24	NanoApostle	PS4, PS5, XBO, XBX/S		Action	18Light Game	PQube	
April 24	Phantom Brave: The Lost Hero	WIN		Tactical RPG	Nippon Ichi Software	JP: Nippon Ichi Software; WW: NIS America	
April 24	Super Technos World: River City & Technos Arcade Classics	WIN, NS, PS5	Compilation		Arc System Works		
April 24	Triggerheart Exelica -Enhanced- (JP)	NS		Shoot 'em up	Cosmo Machia		
April 25	Ao Oni: The Horror of Blueberry Onsen	NS		Horror, Puzzle, Action-adventure	Game Studio		
April 25	Days Gone Remastered	PS5	Remaster	Action-adventure	Bend Studio	Sony Interactive Entertainment	
April 25	Yokai Landlord: Monster Mystery!	WIN		Social deduction, Adventure	Shadow Glove	Fine	
April 29	Cooking Companions	NS, PS4, PS5, XBO, XBX/S		Horror (psych), Visual novel	Deer Dream Studios	Serenity Forge	
April 29	Forza Horizon 5	PS5	Port	Racing	Playground Games	Xbox Game Studios	
April 29	FragPunk	PS5, XBX/S		FPS, Hero shooter	Bad Guitar Studio	NetEase Games	
April 30	Neptunia Riders VS Dogoos	WIN	Port	Action	Compile Heart	Idea Factory International	
April 30	MotoGP 25	WIN, NS, PS4, PS5, XBO, XBX/S		Racing	Milestone		
April 30	NOROI KAGO: the Grudged Domain	WIN	Full release	Survival horror	Toydium	Toei Animation	
April 30	Skin Deep	WIN		FPS	Blendo Games	Annapurna Games	
May 1	Ao Oni: The Horror of Blueberry Onsen	WIN		Horror, Puzzle, Action-adventure	Game Studio		
May 1	Despelote	WIN, PS4, PS5, XBX/S	Original	Adventure	Julián Cordero, Sebastián Valbuena	Panic	
May 1	Peglin	PS4, PS5, XBO, XBX/S		Roguelike, RPG	Red Nexus Games	BlitWorks Games	
May 1	Seedsow Lullaby	NS, iOS, DROID		Visual novel	iMel	ANIPLEX.EXE	
May 1	Shotgun Cop Man	WIN, NS		Action, Platformer	DeadToast Entertainment	Devolver Digital	
May 6	Age of Empires II: Definitive Edition	PS5	Port	RTS	Forgotten Empires, Tantalus Media, Wicked Witch	Xbox Game Studios	
May 6	Captain Blood	WIN, NS, PS4, PS5, XBO, XBX/S	Original	Action	Seawolf Studio, General Arcade	SNEG	
May 6	High on Life	NS	Port	FPS	Squanch Games		
May 7	Deck of Haunts	WIN	Original	Deck building, Roguelike	Mantis Games	Dangen Entertainment	
May 7	Touhou Spell Carnival	WIN		Tactical RPG, Bullet hell	Compile Heart, Sting Entertainment	Idea Factory International	
May 8	Bahamut and the Waqwaq Tree	WIN	Original	Adventure	Starvania Studios	Soft Source Publishing	
May 8	Cash Cleaner Simulator	WIN		Business sim	Mind Control Games	Forklift Interactive, Digital Pajamas	
May 8	Doloc Town	WIN	Early access	Adventure	RedSaw Games Studio	Logoi Games	
May 8	Empyreal	WIN, PS5, XBX/S		Action RPG	Silent Games	Secret Mode	
May 8	G-Mode Archives+: Shin Megami Tensei: 20XX (JP)	WIN		RPG	Atlus	G-Mode	
May 8	The Midnight Walk	WIN, PS5	Original	Adventure	MoonHood	Fast Travel Games	
May 8	Revenge of the Savage Planet	WIN, PS4, PS5, XBX/S		Action-adventure	Raccoon Logic		
May 8	Spirit of the North 2	WIN, PS5, XBX/S	Original	Adventure	Infuse Studio	Silver Lining Interactive	
May 8	Tokimeki Memorial: forever with you Emotional (JP)	NS		Dating sim	Konami Digital Entertainment		
May 8	Vambrace: Dungeon Monarch	WIN	Full release	Deck building, Tower defense	Dvora Studio	Headup Games	
May 8	Yes, Your Grace: Snowfall	WIN		RPG, Strategy	Brave at Night		
May 9	Final Zone	WIN, LIN, PS4, PS5, XBO, XBX/S	Port	Scrolling shooter (isometric)	Edia	Shinyuden, Ratalaika Games	
May 9	Little Kitty, Big City	PS4, PS5	Port	Adventure	Double Dagger Studio		
May 9	Spiritfall	NS, PS4, PS5, XBO, XBX/S		Action, Roguelike	Gentle Giant		
May 13	Death end re;Quest: Code Z (WW)	PS4, PS5		Roguelike, RPG	Compile Heart	Idea Factory International	
May 13	Labyrinth of the Demon King	WIN, NS, PS4, PS5, XBO, XBX/S		Survival horror	J.R. Hudepohl	Top Hat Studios	
May 13	Palia	PS5, XBX/S		Life sim, MMO	Singularity 6		
May 13	The Precinct	WIN, PS5, XBX/S		Sandbox, Action	Fallen Tree Games	Kwalee	
May 13	The Sinking City Remastered	WIN, PS5, XBX/S	Remaster	Adventure	Frogwares		
May 15	7'scarlet (WW)	NS		Otome, Visual novel	Otomate, Toybox	Aksys Games	
May 15	American Arcadia	NS, PS4, PS5, XBO, XBX/S		Puzzle-platformer	Out of the Blue Games	Raw Fury	
May 15	Doom: The Dark Ages	WIN, PS5, XBX/S	Original	FPS	id Software	Bethesda Softworks	
May 15	Nubs! Arena	WIN		MOBA	Rangatang, Glowfish Interactive		
May 15	Seven Knights Re:Birth (KR)	WIN, iOS, DROID	Remake	RPG	Netmarble Nexus	Netmarble	
May 15	Shovel Knight Dig	PS5, XBO, XBX/S	Port	Action, Roguelike	Nitrome, Yacht Club Games	Yacht Club Games	
May 15	Soukoku no Kusabi: Hiiro no Kakera (JP)	NS		Otome, Visual novel	Otomate	Idea Factory	
May 15	Yasha: Legends of the Demon Blade	WIN, NS, PS4, PS5, XBX/S		Action RPG	7Quark	Game Source Entertainment	
May 16	Capcom Fighting Collection 2	WIN, NS, PS4, XBO	Compilation	Fighting	Capcom		
May 16	Killer Instinct Gold	NS	Port	Fighting	Rare	Nintendo	
May 19	Nitro Express	WIN		Action	Grayfax Software	Playism	
May 20	Kathy Rain 2: Soothsayer	WIN, OSX, LIN		PCA	Clifftop Games	Raw Fury	
May 20	Neko Neko Travel Agency: Peachy Town Revitalization Project	WIN, NS		Visual novel	Rabbitfoot		
May 20	RoadCraft	WIN, PS5, XBX/S		CMS	Saber Interactive	Focus Entertainment	
May 20	Teenage Mutant Ninja Turtles: Splintered Fate	PS4, PS5	Port	Roguelike	Super Evil Megacorp		
May 21	Fantasy Life i: The Girl Who Steals Time	WIN, NS, PS4, PS5, XBX/S		RPG	Level-5 Osaka Office	Level-5	
May 21	Game of Thrones: Kingsroad	WIN, iOS, DROID	Full release	Action-adventure, RPG	Netmarble	Warner Bros. Games	
May 21	Knock on the Coffin Lid	PS5, XBX/S		Deck building (roguelike)	Redboon		
May 21	Monster Train 2	WIN, NS, PS5, XBX/S	Original	Deck building (roguelike)	Shiny Shoe	Big Fan Games	
May 22	Ayakashi Gohan: Oomori! for S (JP)	NS		Visual novel	Honeybee	Edia, arithmetic	
May 22	Blades of Fire	WIN, PS5, XBX/S		Action-adventure	MercurySteam	505 Games	
May 22	Bloodshed	WIN	Full release	Roguelike, FPS	com8com1 Software	Headup Games	
May 22	Deliver at All Costs	WIN, PS5, XBX/S	Original	Action	Far Out Games	Konami Digital Entertainment	
May 22	Duck Detective: The Ghost of Glamping	WIN, OSX, LIN, NS, PS5, XBO, XBX/S		Adventure	Happy Broccoli Games		
May 22	Duck Detective: The Secret Salami	PS5		Adventure	Happy Broccoli Games		
May 22	Teenage Mutant Ninja Turtles: Tactical Takedown	WIN	Original	TBT	Strange Scaffold		
May 22	Mobile Suit Gundam SEED: Battle Destiny Remastered	WIN, NS	Remaster	Action	Bandai Namco Forge Digitals	Bandai Namco Entertainment	
May 22	The Town of Nie: Iromusubi	WIN, NS		Visual novel	√ZOMBILiCA, Dramatic Create	Dramatic Create	
May 22	Warhammer 40,000: Boltgun – Words of Vengeance	WIN		Typing, Shoot 'em up (rail)	Auroch Digital		
May 22	Warhammer 40,000: Speed Freeks	WIN	Full release	Racing, Vehicular combat	Caged Element	Wired Productions	
May 22	Worshippers of Cthulhu	WIN	Full release	RTS, City builder	Crazy Goat Games	Crytivo	
May 22	Ys Memoire: Memories of Celceta (JP)	NS	Port	Action RPG	Nihon Falcom		
May 23	Gradius: The Interstellar Assault/Nemesis II: The Return of the Hero	NS	Port	Scrolling shooter	Konami		
May 23	Kirby's Star Stacker	NS	Port	Puzzle	HAL Laboratory	Nintendo	
May 23	Onimusha 2: Samurai's Destiny	WIN, NS, PS4, XBO	Remaster	Action-adventure	Capcom		
May 23	Survival Kids/Stranded Kids	NS	Port	RPG, Survival	Konami Computer Entertainment Sapporo	Konami	
May 23	The Sword of Hope	NS	Port	RPG	Kemco	NA: Seika Corporation; JP/EU: Kemco	
May 23	Tainted Grail: The Fall of Avalon	WIN, PS5, XBX/S	Full release	Action RPG	Questline	Awaken Realms	
May 27	Despera Drops	WIN		Visual novel	D3 Publisher, Red Entertainment	D3 Publisher	
May 27	Oddsparks: An Automation Adventure	WIN, PS5, XBX/S	Full release	RTS	Massive Miniteam	HandyGames	
May 27	Roboquest	PS4, PS5		Roguelike, FPS	RyseUp Studios	Starbreeze Studios	
May 28	Pipistrello and the Cursed Yoyo	WIN, NS, PS4, PS5, XBO, XBX/S	Original	Platformer, Adventure	Pocket Trap	PM Studios	
May 28	Project Warlock II	WIN	Full release	FPS	Buckshot Software	Retrovibe	
May 28	to a T	WIN, PS5, XBX/S		Puzzle, Adventure	uvula	Annapurna Interactive	
May 29	Sonic Wings Reunion (JP)	WIN, NS, PS4, PS5		Scrolling shooter (vertical)	Success	Hamster Corporation	
May 29	BYAKKO: Shijin Butai Enrenki (JP)	NS		Otome, Visual novel	Otomate	Idea Factory	
May 29	Coneru: Dimension Girl	WIN, NS		Action, Platformer	Hike, Eallin Japan	Hike	
May 29	Fuga: Melodies of Steel 3	WIN, NS, PS4, PS5, XBO, XBX/S		Tactical RPG	CyberConnect2		
May 29	Guilty as Sock!	WIN, OSX		Party	Demon Max		
May 29	Perennial Dusk: Kinsenka	WIN		Visual novel	Frontwing	Bushiroad Games	
May 29	Saeko: Giantess Dating Sim	WIN, LIN	Original	Adventure, Visual novel	Safe Havn	Hyper Real	
May 29	Scar-Lead Salvation	WIN, PS4, PS5		Roguelike, TPS	Compile Heart, Neilo	JP: Compile Heart; WW: Idea Factory International	
May 29	Shikhondo: Youkai Rampage	NS		Shoot 'em up	DeerFarm	CFK	
May 29	Sono Hi no Kemono ni wa (JP)	NS, PS4		Visual novel	minori	Entergram	
May 29	Spray Paint Simulator	WIN, PS4, PS5, XBO, XBX/S		Simulation	North Star Video Games	Whitethorn Games	
May 29	Steam-Heart's & Advanced Variable Geo Saturn Tribute (JP)	WIN, NS, PS4, PS5		Shoot 'em up, Fighting	City Connection		
May 29	Wobbly Life	NS	Early access, Port	Simulation	RubberBandGames	Curve Games	
May 30	Disney Illusion Island	WIN, PS5, XBX/S	Port	Platformer	Dlala Studios	Disney Interactive	
May 30	Elden Ring Nightreign	WIN, PS4, PS5, XBO, XBX/S	Original	Action RPG	FromSoftware	Bandai Namco Entertainment	
May 30	Eternal Evil	PS5, XBX/S		Survival horror, FPS	Honor Games	Axyos Games	
May 30	F1 25	WIN, PS5, XBX/S	Original	Racing	Codemasters	Electronic Arts	
May 30	Hypercharge: Unboxed	PS4, PS5		FPS, TPS	Digital Cybercherries		
May 30	Trinity Trigger	iOS, DROID		Action RPG	Three Rings	FuRyu	
June 3	Rise of Industry 2	WIN, PS5, XBX/S		Business sim	SomaSim	Kasedo Games	
June 4	Deltarune: Chapters 1+2	PS5	Port	RPG, Adventure	Toby Fox, 8-4	8-4	
June 4	Deltarune: Chapters 3+4	WIN, OSX, NS, PS4, PS5	Episode	RPG, Adventure	Toby Fox, 8-4 (consoles)		
June 5	Arcade Archives 2 Ridge Racer	NS2, PS5, XBX/S		Racing	Hamster Corporation, Namco	Hamster Corporation	
June 5	Bravely Default: Flying Fairy HD Remaster	NS2	Remaster	RPG	Cattle Call	Square Enix	
June 5	Civilization VII	NS2	Port	TBS, 4X	Firaxis Games	2K	
June 5	Cyberpunk 2077: Ultimate Edition	NS2	Port	Action RPG	CD Projekt Red	CD Projekt	
June 5	Deltarune: Chapters 1+2+3+4	NS2	Port	RPG, Adventure	Toby Fox, 8-4	8-4	
June 5	Etheria: Restart	WIN, iOS, DROID		TBS, RPG	XD Games		
June 5	Fantasy Life i: The Girl Who Steals Time	NS2	Port	RPG	Level-5 Osaka Office	Level-5	
June 5	Fast Fusion	NS2	Original	Racing	Shin'en Multimedia		
June 5	Fortnite	NS2	Port	Survival, Battle royale, Sandbox	Epic Games		
June 5	Gal Guardians: Servants of the Dark	XBO, XBX/S	Port	Metroidvania, Action-adventure	Inti Creates		
June 5	Hitman: World of Assassination – Signature Edition	NS2	Port	Stealth	IO Interactive		
June 5	Hogwarts Legacy	NS2	Port	Action RPG	Avalanche Software	Portkey Games	
June 5	Kunitsu-Gami: Path of the Goddess	NS2	Port	Action, Strategy	Capcom		
June 5	The Legend of Zelda: Breath of the Wild – Nintendo Switch 2 Edition	NS2	Remaster	Action-adventure	Nintendo EPD	Nintendo	
June 5	The Legend of Zelda: Tears of the Kingdom – Nintendo Switch 2 Edition	NS2	Remaster	Action-adventure	Nintendo EPD	Nintendo	
June 5	Survival Kids	NS2	Original	Survival, Adventure	Konami Digital Entertainment		
June 5	Mario Kart World	NS2	Original	Racing (kart)	Nintendo EPD	Nintendo	
June 5	Natsume's Book of Friends: Hazuki no Shirushi (JP)	WIN, NS		Adventure, Visual novel	Toydium	Bushiroad Games	
June 5	Nintendo Switch 2 Welcome Tour	NS2	Original	Simulation	Nintendo		
June 5	Nobunaga's Ambition: Awakening Complete Edition	NS2, PS5	Port	TBS	Kou Shibusawa	Koei Tecmo	
June 5	Picross: Juufuutei Raden's Guide for Pixel Museum	WIN, NS		Puzzle	Jupiter Corporation		
June 5	Puyo Puyo Tetris 2S	NS2		Puzzle	Sega		
June 5	The Red Bell's Lament	NS		Otome, Visual novel	AmuLit	Voltage	
June 5	Rune Factory: Guardians of Azuma	WIN, NS, NS2	Original	Action RPG, Simulation	Marvelous		
June 5	Shine Post: Be Your Idol! (JP)	NS2		Raising sim, Simulation	Konami Digital Entertainment		
June 5	Sonic X Shadow Generations	NS2	Port	Platformer	Sonic Team	Sega	
June 5	Split Fiction	NS2	Port	Action-adventure	Hazelight Studios	Electronic Arts	
June 5	Street Fighter 6	NS2	Port	Fighting	Capcom		
June 5	Suikoden I & II HD Remaster: Gate Rune and Dunan Unification Wars	NS2	Port	Tactical RPG	Konami Digital Entertainment		
June 5	Suuran Digit (JP)	NS		Otome, Visual novel	Otomate	Idea Factory	
June 5	Trizeal Remix	NS		Scrolling shooter (vertical)	Triangle Service		
June 5	Yakuza 0 Director's Cut	NS2	Remaster	Action-adventure	Ryu Ga Gotoku Studio	Sega	
June 6	Dragon is Dead	WIN	Full release	Roguelike, Action, Platformer	Team Suneat	PM Studios	
June 6	Splitgate 2	WIN, PS4, PS5, XBO, XBX/S	Original	FPS	1047 Games		
June 6	Zenless Zone Zero	XBX/S	Port	Action RPG, Hack and slash	miHoYo	CHN: miHoYo; WW: Cognosphere	
June 8	Final Fantasy XVI	XBX/S	Port	Action RPG	Square Enix		
June 10	Alien Hominid HD	PS4, PS5	Port	Run and gun	The Behemoth		
June 10	Alien Hominid Invasion	PS4, PS5	Port	Run and gun	The Behemoth		
June 10	Dune: Awakening	WIN	Original	Survival, MMO, RPG	Funcom		
June 10	MindsEye	WIN, PS5, XBX/S	Original	Action-adventure	Build a Rocket Boy	IO Interactive	
June 10	Star Trucker	PS5	Port	Vehicle sim	Monster and Monster	Raw Fury	
June 10	Warhammer 40,000: Space Marine – Master Crafted Edition	WIN, XBX/S	Remaster	TPS, Hack and slash	SneakyBox, Relic Entertainment	Sega	
June 11	Kanade	WIN		Visual novel	Frontwing	Good Smile Company	
June 11	Legendary Hoplite	NS, PS4, PS5, XBO, XBX/S		Action RPG, Tower defense	TripleBricksGames	Ravenage	
June 11	Stellar Blade	WIN	Port	Action-adventure	Shift Up	Sony Interactive Entertainment	
June 12	Backyard Baseball '97	NS, PS5	Port	Sports	Mega Cat Studios	Playground Productions	
June 12	Virtual Girl @ World's End	WIN, NS		Visual novel	Headlock	Bushiroad Games	
June 12	Wizard of Legend II	WIN, PS5, XBX/S	Full release	Action, Roguelike	Dead Mage	Humble Games	
June 13	The Alters	WIN, PS5, XBX/S		Survival	11 Bit Studios		
June 13	Five Nights at Freddy's: Secret of the Mimic	WIN, PS5	Original	Survival horror	Steel Wool Studios		
June 16	Gex Trilogy	WIN, NS, PS5, XBX/S	Compilation	Platformer	Limited Run Games, Crystal Dynamics	Limited Run Games	
June 16	Peak	WIN	Original	Action-adventure	Aggro Crab, Landfall		
June 16	Revival: Recolonization	XBO, XBX/S		TBS, 4X	HeroCraft PC		
June 17	Date Everything!	WIN, NS, PS5, XBX/S	Original	Dating sim	Sassy Chap Games	Team17	
June 17	FBC: Firebreak	WIN, PS5, XBX/S		FPS	Remedy Entertainment		
June 17	Lost in Random: The Eternal Die	WIN, NS, PS5, XBX/S		Roguelike, Action-adventure	Stormteller Games	Thunderful Games	
June 17	Minecraft	XBX/S	Port	Sandbox, Survival	Mojang Studios, Xbox Game Studios	Xbox Game Studios	
June 17	Scum	WIN	Full release	Survival	Gamepires	Jagex	
June 17	Shadowverse: Worlds Beyond	WIN, iOS, DROID		DCCG	Cygames		
June 17	Songs of Conquest	NS		TBS	Lavapotion	Coffee Stain Publishing	
June 17	Tron: Catalyst	WIN, NS, PS5, XBX/S	Original	Action-adventure	Bithell Games	Big Fan Games	
June 18	No Sun To Worship	NS, PS5, XBX/S		Stealth, Action	Merlino Games	Hyperstrange	
June 19	Broken Arrow	WIN		RTT	Steel Balalaika Studio	Slitherine Software	
June 19	Cho Aniki: Bakuretsu Ranto-hen (JP)	NS		Fighting	Masaya Games, Edia	Edia	
June 19	Final Fantasy XIV Mobile (CN)	iOS, DROID	Original	MMO, RPG	LightSpeed Studios	Square Enix	
June 19	Fruitbus	PS5		Adventure, Cooking	Krillbite Studio	Silver Lining Interactive	
June 19	Hungry Meem	WIN, NS		Simulation	Drecom		
June 19	Raidou Remastered: The Mystery of the Soulless Army	WIN, NS, NS2, PS4, PS5, XBO, XBX/S	Remaster	Action RPG	Atlus		
June 19	Rematch	WIN, PS5, XBX/S	Original	Sports	Sloclap	Sloclap, Kepler Interactive	
June 19	Robots at Midnight	WIN, XBX/S		Action RPG	Finish Line Games	Snail Games USA	
June 19	Sea Fantasy	NS		Action RPG	METASLA		
June 19	Spray Paint Simulator	NS		Simulation	North Star Video Games	Whitethorn Games	
June 19	Star Overdrive	WIN, PS5, XBX/S		Action-adventure	Caracal Games	Dear Villagers	
June 19	Toki no Kizuna (JP)	NS		Otome, Visual novel	Design Factory, Otomate	Idea Factory	
June 19	Vessels of Decay	WIN, OSX, LIN, NS, PS4, PS5, XBO, XBX/S		Action-adventure	Simon Jakobsson, Aurora Punks	Headup Games	
June 19	Yaoling: Mythical Journey	WIN	Full release	RPG	Rayka Studio	Rayka Studio, NPC Entertainment	
June 20	The Legend of Dark Witch Episode 4	WIN	Original	Action	Inside System		
June 22	UNDERWARD	PS5		Horror	INTENSE		
June 23	Outrider Mako	WIN		Action-adventure	Asamado Games	Playism	
June 24	Oceanhorn: Chronos Dungeon	iOS, DROID		Action-adventure, Dungeon crawl	Cornfox & Bros.	FDG Entertainment	
June 24	Teenage Mutant Ninja Turtles: Splintered Fate	XBO, XBX/S	Port	Roguelike	Super Evil Megacorp		
June 25	Alterna Vvelt: Blue Exorcist Another Story	iOS, DROID	Original	Action RPG	Aniplex		
June 25	I Am Your Beast	PS5, XBX/S	Port	FPS	Strange Scaffold		
June 25	Marvel Mystic Mayhem	iOS, DROID	Original	Tactical RPG	NetEase Games		
June 25	Parry Nightmare	NS		Action	KAKUKAKU GAMES	Phoenixx	
June 25	Poppy Playtime: Chapter 4	NS, PS4, PS5, XBO, XBX/S	Episode	Survival horror	Mob Entertainment		
June 26	Against the Storm	NS, PS4, PS5, XBO, XBX/S		City builder	Eremite Games	Hooded Horse	
June 26	Calamity Angels: Special Delivery (JP)	NS, PS4, PS5		RPG	Compile Heart		
June 26	Death Stranding 2: On the Beach	PS5	Original	Action-adventure	Kojima Productions	Sony Interactive Entertainment	
June 26	Front Mission 3 Remake	NS	Remake	Tactical RPG	MegaPixel Studio	Forever Entertainment	
June 26	Master of Monsters SSB (JP)	WIN, NS, PS4, PS5		Strategy	SystemSoft Beta		
June 26	Persona 5: The Phantom X (WW)	WIN, iOS, DROID	Original	RPG, Social sim	Black Wings Game Studio	Atlus, Sega	
June 26	Shirokoi Sakura Gram (JP)	NS, PS4		Visual novel	NanaWind	Entergram	
June 26	Stasis	NS, PS4, PS5, XBO, XBX/S		Survival horror, PCA	The Brotherhood	Feardemic	
June 26	System Shock 2: 25th Anniversary Remaster	WIN	Remaster	FPS, Action RPG	Nightdive Studios		
June 26	Farland Saga I & II Saturn Tribute (JP)	WIN, NS, PS4, PS5, XBO		Tactical RPG	City Connection		
June 26	ToHeart Remake	WIN		Visual novel	Aquaplus	Shiravune, DMM Games	
June 26	ToHeart Remake (JP)	NS		Visual novel	Aquaplus		
June 26	Umamusume: Pretty Derby (WW)	WIN, iOS, DROID	Original	Raising sim	Cygames		
June 26	Until Then	NS	Port	Adventure	Polychroma Games	Maximum Entertainment	
June 27	Antro	WIN, PS5, XBX/S		Rhythm, Action, Puzzle-platformer	Gatera Studio	Selecta Play	
June 27	Oceanhorn: Chronos Dungeon	WIN		Action-adventure, Dungeon crawl	Cornfox & Bros.	FDG Entertainment	
June 27	Tamagotchi Plaza	NS, NS2	Original	Adventure	HYDE	Bandai Namco Entertainment	
June 30	Drapline	WIN	Early access	Raising sim, Roguelite	Kanawo, Vaka Game Magazine	Vaka Game Magazine	

=== July–September ===
Release date	Title	Platform	Type	Genre	Developer	Publisher	Ref.
July 1	Anger Foot	PS5		Action	Free Lives	Devolver Digital	
July 1	Irem Collection Volume 3	NS, PS4, PS5, XBO, XBX/S	Compilation	Shoot 'em up	ININ Games, Irem, Tozai Games	ININ Games	
July 1	Mecha Break	WIN, XBX/S	Original	TPS, Vehicular combat (mecha)	Seasun Games		
July 2	Firmament	PS4, PS5		Adventure	Cyan Worlds		
July 3	Angry Birds Bounce	iOS	Original	Puzzle	Rovio Entertainment		
July 8	Backyard Baseball '01	WIN, iOS, DROID	Remaster	Sports	Mega Cat Studios	Playground Productions	
July 8	Missile Command Delta	WIN, NS, PS5, XBO, XBX/S		TBT	Mighty Yell, 13AM Games	Atari	
July 10	Bad End Theater	NS, PS4, PS5, XBO, XBX/S		Visual novel	NomnomNami	Serenity Forge	
July 10	Cats Away (WW)	WIN, NS, PS5		Tower defense	Studio Saizensen	Nicalis	
July 10	EA Sports College Football 26	PS5, XBX/S	Original	Sports	EA Orlando	Electronic Arts	
July 10	Everdeep Aurora	WIN, NS		Adventure	Nautilus Games	Ysbryd Games	
July 10	Islanders: New Shores	WIN, OSX, NS, PS5, XBX/S	Original	City builder, Casual	Coatsink		
July 10	Mycopunk	WIN	Early access	FPS	Pigeons at Play	Devolver Digital	
July 10	System Shock 2: 25th Anniversary Remaster	NS, PS4, PS5, XBO, XBX/S	Port	FPS, Action RPG	Nightdive Studios		
July 11	Bendy and the Dark Revival	NS, PS5, XBX/S		Survival horror	Joey Drew Studios		
July 11	Griffin	WIN, NS, PS4, PS5, XBO, XBX/S		Shoot 'em up	Edia	Shinyuden, Ratalaika Games	
July 11	Patapon 1+2 Replay	WIN, NS, PS5	Remaster, Compilation	Rhythm	SAS	Bandai Namco Entertainment	
July 11	Tony Hawk's Pro Skater 3 + 4	WIN, NS, NS2, PS4, PS5, XBO, XBX/S	Remake, Compilation	Sports	Iron Galaxy	Activision	
July 13	World's End Club	PS5		Action-adventure	Too Kyo Games	IzanagiGames	
July 14	Arashi Gaiden	WIN		Action	Statera Studio, Wired Dreams Studio	Nuntius Games, Vsoo Games	
July 15	Edens Zero	WIN, PS5, XBX/S		Action RPG	Konami Digital Entertainment		
July 15	Eriksholm: The Stolen Dream	WIN, PS5, XBX/S		Stealth, Adventure, Strategy	River End Games	Nordcurrent Labs	
July 15	Neverwinter Nights 2: Enhanced Edition	WIN, NS, PS5, XBX/S	Remaster	RPG	Aspyr		
July 15	Ready or Not	PS5, XBX/S		FPS, Tactical shooter	VOID Interactive		
July 15	Stronghold Crusader: Definitive Edition	WIN	Remaster	RTS	Firefly Studios		
July 16	Kinki Spiritual Affairs Bureau	PS5, XBX/S	Port	Horror, Action	Noto Muteki	AMATA Games	
July 17	Anomaly Collapse	NS		TBS, Roguelike	RocketPunch Games	Spiral Up Games	
July 17	Bridge Constructor Studio	WIN, OSX, LIN, NS, PS4, PS5, XBO, XBX/S, iOS, DROID		Puzzle, Simulation	ClockStone Studio	Headup Games	
July 17	Cyberpunk 2077	OSX	Port	Action RPG	CD Projekt Red	CD Projekt	
July 17	Daisenryaku SSB (JP)	PS5		Strategy	SystemSoft Beta		
July 17	Donkey Kong Bananza	NS2	Original	Platformer, Adventure	Nintendo EPD	Nintendo	
July 17	The Drifter	WIN, OSX, LIN		PCA	Powerhoof		
July 17	Drill Core	WIN	Full release	Strategy	Hungry Couch Games	tinyBuild	
July 17	Golden Tee Arcade Classics	WIN, NS, PS4, PS5, XBO, XBX/S	Compilation	Sports	Digital Eclipse, Incredible Technologies	Atari	
July 17	Hunter × Hunter: Nen × Impact	WIN, NS, PS5		Fighting	Bushiroad Games, Eighting	JP: Bushiroad Games; WW: Arc System Works	
July 17	My Friendly Neighborhood	PS4, PS5, XBO, XBX/S	Port	Survival horror	John Szymanski, Evan Szymanski	DreadXP	
July 17	The Necromancer’s Tale	WIN, OSX	Original	RPG	Psychic Software	Silver Lining Interactive	
July 17	Puella Magi Madoka Magica: Magia Exedra	WIN		RPG	Pokelabo, f4samurai	Aniplex	
July 17	Upin & Ipin Universe	WIN, NS, PS4, PS5		Adventure	Streamline Studios		
July 17	The Wandering Village	WIN, OSX, LIN, NS, PS4, PS5, XBO, XBX/S	Full release	City builder	Stray Fawn Studio	Stray Fawn Publishing, WhisperGames	
July 18	Shadow Labyrinth	WIN, NS, NS2, PS5, XBX/S	Original	Platformer, Action-adventure	Bandai Namco Studios	Bandai Namco Entertainment	
July 21	Descenders Next	WIN, XBO, XBX/S	Full release	Sports, Racing	RageSquid	No More Robots	
July 21	The King is Watching	WIN		Roguelike, Strategy	Hypnohead	tinyBuild	
July 22	Abiotic Factor	WIN, PS5, XBX/S	Full release	Survival	Deep Field Games	Playstack	
July 22	BlazBlue: Entropy Effect	iOS, DROID		Action, Roguelike	91Act		
July 22	Hell Clock	WIN	Original	Action, Roguelike	Rogue Snail	Mad Mushroom	
July 22	Le Mans Ultimate	WIN	Full release	Racing (sim)	Studio 397	Motorsport Games	
July 22	Luto	WIN, PS5, XBX/S		Horror (psych)	Broken Bird Games	Selecta Play	
July 22	Monument Valley 3	WIN, NS, PS4, PS5, XBO, XBX/S	Port	Puzzle	Ustwo Games		
July 22	Pokémon Friends	NS, iOS, DROID		Puzzle	The Pokémon Company		
July 22	UnderMine 2	WIN	Early access	Action-adventure, Roguelike	Thorium Entertainment		
July 22	Wildgate	WIN, PS5, XBX/S		FPS, Adventure	Moonshot Games	Dreamhaven	
July 23	Wheel World	WIN, PS5, XBX/S		Sports	Messhof	Annapurna Interactive	
July 23	WWE 2K25	NS2	Port	Sports	Visual Concepts	2K	
July 24	and Roger	WIN, OSX, NS	Original	Adventure, Visual novel	TearyHand Studio	Kodansha	
July 24	Azure Striker Gunvolt Trilogy Enhanced	NS, PS5	Remaster, Compilation	Platformer, Action-adventure	Inti Creates		
July 24	Endzone 2	WIN	Full release	City builder, Survival	Gentlymad Studios	Assemble Entertainment	
July 24	Ed & Edda: Grand Prix – Racing Champions	WIN, NS, PS5, XBX/S	Original	Racing	Tivola Games, Funatics	Tivola Games	
July 24	The Great Villainess: Strategy of Lily	WIN	Original	TBS	One or EIGHT, WSS Playground, Alliance Arts	Alliance Arts	
July 24	Hololive Goro Goro Mountain	WIN, OSX		Action	BeXide	Hololive Indie	
July 24	Illusion of Itehari: trail (JP)	NS	Original	Otome, Visual novel	LicoBiTs	Broccoli	
July 24	Killing Floor 3	WIN, PS5, XBX/S	Original	Horror, FPS	Tripwire Interactive		
July 24	La storia della Arcana Famiglia: Rinato	NS		Visual novel	HuneX	Dramatic Create	
July 24	Memories Off Fan Disc Historia (JP)	NS, PS4		Visual novel	Mages		
July 24	Soma	NS	Port	Survival horror	Abylight Studios	Frictional Games	
July 24	Super Mario Party Jamboree – Nintendo Switch 2 Edition + Jamboree TV	NS2	Port, Expansion	Party	Nintendo Cube	Nintendo	
July 24	SUPERVIVE	WIN	Full release	Battle royale	Theorycraft Games		
July 24	Wuchang: Fallen Feathers	WIN, PS5, XBX/S		Soulslike, Action RPG	Leenzee Games	505 Games	
July 25	Flame Keeper	PS5		Roguelike, Action	Kautki Cave	Untold Tales	
July 25	No Sleep for Kaname Date – From AI: The Somnium Files	WIN, NS, NS2	Original	Adventure, Visual novel	Spike Chunsoft		
July 25	Wild Hearts S	NS2	Port	Action RPG	Omega Force	Koei Tecmo	
July 28	One-Eyed Likho	WIN		Horror, Adventure	Morteshka		
July 29	Achilles: Survivor	WIN, PS4, PS5, XBO, XBX/S	Full release	Bullet heaven, Action, Roguelike	Dark Point Games		
July 29	Grounded 2	WIN, XBX/S	Early access	Action-adventure, survival	Eidos-Montréal, Obsidian Entertainment	Xbox Game Studios	
July 29	Mado Monogatari: Fia and the Wondrous Academy (WW)	NS, PS4, PS5		Dungeon crawl, RPG	Sting Entertainment, D4 Enterprise	Idea Factory International	
July 29	Tales of the Shire: A The Lord of the Rings Game	WIN, NS, PS5, XBX/S	Original	Life sim	Wētā Workshop	Private Division	
July 30	Sky the Scraper	WIN	Original	Action-adventure, Roguelike	Ryo Kobuchi	HYPER REAL, Toydium	
July 30	Wargroove 2	iOS, DROID		TBT	Chucklefish		
July 31	9 Years of Shadows	PS4, PS5, XBO, XBX/S		Metroidvania	Halberd Studios	JanduSoft	
July 31	Chillin' by the Fire	NS2		Simulation	Oink Games		
July 31	Cotton Reboot! High Tension! (JP)	NS, PS4, PS5		Shoot 'em up	Beep		
July 31	Dead Take	WIN		Horror (psych)	Surgent Studios	Pocketpair Publishing	
July 31	Dear me, I was...	NS2		Adventure	Arc System Works		
July 31	Earthion	WIN, NS, PS4, PS5, XBX/S		Shoot 'em up	Ancient	Limited Run Games, Superdeluxe Games	
July 31	Fuuraiki 5 (JP)	NS, PS4, PS5		Adventure	Nippon Ichi Software		
July 31	Groove Coaster: Future Performers (JP)	NS		Rhythm	Taito		
July 31	Haikyu!! Fly High (WW)	iOS, DROID		Sports	Changyou, Prophet Games	KLab, Garena	
July 31	Harvest Moon: The Lost Valley / Harvest Moon: Skytree Village	NS	Compilation	Farming	Natsume Inc.		
July 31	Heartworm	WIN	Original	Survival horror	Vincent Adinolfi	DreadXP	
July 31	Mashina	WIN		Adventure	Talha & Jack Co.		
July 31	Mononoke Chigiri (JP)	NS		Otome, Visual novel	Otomate	Idea Factory	
July 31	Mystereet: Yasogami Kaoru no Chousen! (JP)	NS, PS4, XBX/S		Adventure	Mages		
July 31	Ninja Gaiden: Ragebound	WIN, NS, PS4, PS5, XBO, XBX/S	Original	Platformer, Action-adventure	The Game Kitchen	Dotemu	
July 31	Noctuary	NS, PS5		Action-adventure	Gratesca Studio	Game Source Entertainment	
July 31	Spy Drops	WIN, NS		Stealth, Action	Rainy Night Creations	Rainy Frog	
July 31	Time Flies	WIN, OSX, NS, PS5		Adventure	Playables	Panic	
July 31	Ys IX: Monstrum Nox (JP)	PS5		Action RPG	Nihon Falcom		
July 31	Ys VIII: Lacrimosa of Dana (JP)	PS5		Action RPG	Nihon Falcom		
July 31	Ys X: Proud Nordics (JP)	NS2		Action RPG	Nihon Falcom		
August 1	Demon Slayer: Kimetsu no Yaiba – The Hinokami Chronicles 2 (JP)	WIN, NS, PS4, PS5, XBO, XBX/S		Fighting, Action-adventure	CyberConnect2	JP: Aniplex; WW: Sega	
August 1	Wander Stars	WIN, NS		Roguelike	Paper Castle	Fellow Traveller	
August 4	Catto's Post Office	WIN	Original	Adventure	In Shambles Studio		
August 5	Apex Legends	NS2	Port	Battle royale, Hero shooter	Respawn Entertainment	Electronic Arts	
August 5	Demon Slayer: Kimetsu no Yaiba – The Hinokami Chronicles 2 (WW)	WIN, NS, PS4, PS5, XBO, XBX/S		Fighting, Action-adventure	CyberConnect2	JP: Aniplex; WW: Sega	
August 5	Hello Kitty Island Adventure	PS5	Port	Adventure	Sunblink		
August 5	Stormgate	WIN	Full release	RTS	Frost Giant Studios		
August 5	Turbo Kid	NS		Metroidvania, Action-adventure	Outerminds		
August 7	ACA NeoGeo Selection Vol. 5 (JP)	NS	Compilation	—N/a	Hamster Corporation, SNK	SNK	
August 7	ACA NeoGeo Selection Vol. 6 (JP)	NS	Compilation	—N/a	Hamster Corporation, SNK	SNK	
August 7	Artis Impact	WIN	Original	RPG	Mas	Feuxon	
August 7	Corpse Party Tetralogy Pack (JP)	NS	Compilation	Horror	Team GrisGris	Mages	
August 7	Fate/hollow ataraxia Remastered	WIN, NS	Remaster	Visual novel	Type-Moon	Aniplex	
August 7	Gradius Origins	WIN, NS, PS5, XBX/S	Compilation	Shoot 'em up	Konami Digital Entertainment		
August 7	Heretic + Hexen	WIN, NS, PS4, PS5, XBO, XBX/S	Compilation	FPS	id Software, Nightdive Studios	Bethesda Softworks	
August 7	The House of the Dead 2: Remake	WIN, NS	Remake	Shoot 'em up (rail)	MegaPixel Studio	Forever Entertainment	
August 7	Is This Seat Taken?	WIN, OSX, LIN, NS, iOS, DROID	Original	Puzzle	Poti Poti Studio	Wholesome Games	
August 7	Öoo	WIN	Original	Puzzle-platformer	NamaTakahashi, tiny cactus studio, Tsuyomi	NamaTakahashi	
August 7	Operation Night Strikers	WIN, NS		Shoot 'em up (rail)	M2	Taito	
August 7	Ritual of Raven	WIN, NS		Farming	Spellgarden Games	Team17	
August 7	Strange Jigsaws	WIN	Original	Puzzle	Fleb		
August 7	Tiny Bookshop	WIN, OSX, LIN, NS		CMS	neoludic games	Skystone Games, 2P Games	
August 7	Yuukyuu no Tierblade (JP)	NS		Otome, Visual novel	Design Factory, Otomate	Idea Factory	
August 8	Loan Shark	WIN, PS5, XBX/S, NSW		Psychological, horror	Studio Ortica	Dark Product	
August 8	Mafia: The Old Country	WIN, PS5, XBX/S	Original	Action-adventure	Hangar 13	2K	
August 12	Abyssus	WIN	Original	FPS, Roguelike	DoubleMoose	The Arcade Crew	
August 12	Echoes of the End	WIN, PS5, XBX/S		Action-adventure	Myrkur Games	Deep Silver	
August 12	Ra Ra Boom	WIN, PS4, PS5, XBO, XBX/S		Brawler	Gylee Games		
August 12	Senua's Saga: Hellblade II	PS5	Port	Action-adventure	Ninja Theory	Xbox Game Studios	
August 14	Dice Gambit	WIN	Original	Tactical RPG	Chromatic Ink	Spelkollektivet, WhisperGames	
August 14	Dorfromantik	PS4, PS5, XBO, XBX/S		Puzzle, Strategy	Toukana Interactive	Headup Games	
August 14	Drag x Drive	NS2	Original	Sports	Nintendo	Nintendo	
August 14	Iwakura Aria (WW)	WIN, NS		Visual novel	Mages	PQube	
August 14	Teenage Mutant Ninja Turtles: Tactical Takedown	NS, XBX/S	Port	TBT	Strange Scaffold		
August 14	Madden NFL 26	WIN, NS2, PS5, XBX/S	Original	Sports	EA Orlando	Electronic Arts	
August 14	Midnight Murder Club	WIN, PS5	Full release	FPS	Velan Studios	Sony Interactive Entertainment	
August 14	Relic Hunters Legend	WIN, XBX/S	Full release	Looter shooter	Rogue Snail		
August 14	Warhammer 40,000: Dawn of War – Definitive Edition	WIN	Remaster	RTS	Relic Entertainment		
August 15	Bendy: Lone Wolf	WIN, NS, PS4, PS5, XBO, XBX/S		Survival horror	Joey Drew Studios		
August 15	Off	WIN, NS	Remake	RPG	Mortis Ghost	Fangamer	
August 15	Stellar Code (JP)	WIN		Visual novel	Fragaria		
August 16	Touhou Kinjoukyou ~ Fossilized Wonders	WIN		Bullet hell	Team Shanghai Alice		
August 18	BrokenLore: Don't Watch	PS4, PS5, XBO, XBX/S		Horror (psych)	Serafini Productions	Shochiku	
August 19	Crescent Tower	WIN		Dungeon crawl, RPG	Curry Croquette	AMATA Games	
August 19	Delta Force	PS5, XBX/S		FPS	TiMi Studio Group		
August 19	Shantae Advance: Risky Revolution	WIN, NS, PS4, PS5, XBO, XBX/S	Port	Metroidvania, Action-adventure	WayForward		
August 19	Sword of the Sea	WIN, PS5		Adventure	Giant Squid		
August 20	Black Myth: Wukong	XBX/S	Port	Action RPG	Game Science		
August 20	The Rogue Prince of Persia	WIN, PS5, XBX/S	Full release	Roguelike, Platformer	Evil Empire	Ubisoft	
August 20	Triangle Strategy	PS5, XBX/S	Port	Tactical RPG	Square Enix, Artdink	Square Enix	
August 20	Void/Breaker	WIN	Early access	FPS, Roguelite	Stubby Games	Playstack	
August 21	Altheia: The Wrath of Aferi	WIN		Action-adventure, RPG	MarsLit Games	Neon Doctrine	
August 21	Discounty	WIN, NS, PS5, XBX/S		Business sim, Life sim, RPG	Crinkle Cut Games	PQube	
August 21	Grit & Valor: 1949	NS, PS5, XBX/S		Roguelike, RTS	Milky Tea	Megabit	
August 21	Herdling	WIN, NS, PS5, XBX/S	Original	Adventure	Okomotive	Panic	
August 21	Kill the Brickman	WIN, XBO, XBX/S		Puzzle	Doonutsaur	Poncle	
August 21	The Legend of Heroes: Trails into Reverie (JP)	PS5		RPG	Nihon Falcom		
August 21	The Legend of Heroes: Trails of Cold Steel III (JP)	PS5		RPG	Nihon Falcom		
August 21	The Legend of Heroes: Trails of Cold Steel IV (JP)	PS5		RPG	Nihon Falcom		
August 21	Magical Librarian Ariana: The Books of the Seven Heroes (JP)	NS, PS4, PS5		Action RPG	HYDE	Compile Heart	
August 22	WitchSpring R	XBO		RPG	Kiwi Walks		
August 25	TurretGirls	WIN		Shoot 'em up (rail)	Nanairo Enterprise	Dangen Entertainment, Game Source Entertainment	
August 25	Zoochosis	PS4, PS5		Survival horror	Clapperheads		
August 26	Chip 'n Clawz vs. The Brainioids	WIN, PS5, XBX/S		RTS, Action	Snapshot Games	Arc Games	
August 26	Gears of War: Reloaded	WIN, PS5, XBX/S	Port	TPS	The Coalition, Sumo Digital, Disbelief	Xbox Game Studios	
August 26	Helldivers II	XBX/S	Port	TPS	Arrowhead Game Studios	Sony Interactive Entertainment	
August 26	Neptunia Game Maker R:Evolution	WIN		Action RPG	Compile Heart	Idea Factory International	
August 26	Space Adventure Cobra: The Awakening	WIN, NS, PS4, PS5, XBO, XBX/S		Platformer	Magic Pockets	Microids	
August 27	Death end re;Quest: Code Z	WIN		Roguelike, RPG	Compile Heart	Idea Factory International	
August 27	Faraway Train	PS5, XBX/S		Narrative adventure	Tatamibeya	AMATA Games	
August 27	Pastel Parade	WIN		Rhythm	matsu friends	room6	
August 27	Story of Seasons: Grand Bazaar	WIN, NS, NS2		Farming	Marvelous		
August 27	Varlet	WIN, NS, PS5		RPG	Aquria	FuRyu	
August 27	Whisper of the House	WIN, OSX	Original	Puzzle, Simulation	Yuanqi Bomb Studio	Yuanqi Bomb Studio, LoongGate	
August 28	Destiny: Rising	iOS, DROID	Original	RPG, FPS	NetEase Games		
August 28	Dig-Rock: Documentary of Youthful Sounds (JP)	NS		Visual novel	Design Factory	Idea Factory, Altergear	
August 28	High on Life – Nintendo Switch 2 Edition	NS2	Port	FPS	Squanch Games		
August 28	Kirby and the Forgotten Land – Nintendo Switch 2 Edition + Star-Crossed World	NS2	Remaster, Expansion	Platformer, Action-adventure	HAL Laboratory	Nintendo	
August 28	The Knightling	WIN, PS5, XBX/S		Action-adventure, Platformer	Twirlbound	Saber Interactive	
August 28	Lens (JP)	NS, PS4, PS5		Horror, Adventure	Orgesta	Nippon Ichi Software	
August 28	Metal Gear Solid Delta: Snake Eater	WIN, PS5, XBX/S	Remake	Action-adventure, Stealth	Konami Digital Entertainment		
August 28	NOROI KAGO: the Grudged Domain	NS		Survival horror	Toydium	Toei Animation	
August 28	Robots at Midnight	PS5		Action RPG	Finish Line Games	Snail	
August 28	Star Trek: Resurgence	NS	Port	Narrative adventure	Dramatic Labs	Bruner House	
August 28	Super Robot Wars Y	WIN, NS, PS5		Tactical RPG	Bandai Namco Forge Digitals	Bandai Namco Entertainment	
August 28	Telenet Shooting Collection II (Note: Includes Kiaidan 00, Final Zone II, Browning, and Legion.) (JP)	NS	Compilation	Shoot 'em up	Telenet Japan, Edia	Edia	
August 29	The Exit 8	NS2	Port	Walking sim, Horror	Kotake Create	Playism	
August 29	Fear Effect	WIN, NS, PS4, PS5		Action-adventure	Limited Run Games, Square Enix	Limited Run Games	
August 29	Lost Soul Aside	WIN, PS5	Original	Action RPG	Ultizero Games	Sony Interactive Entertainment	
August 29	Shinobi: Art of Vengeance	WIN, NS, PS4, PS5, XBO, XBX/S	Original	Platformer, Action-adventure	Lizardcube	Sega	
August 31	Kaiju No. 8 The Game	WIN, iOS, DROID		RPG, TBT	Akatsuki Games		
September 1	Bad Cheese	WIN, NS, PS4, PS5, XBO, XBX/S		Horror (psych)	Lukasik.art	Feardemic	
September 1	Friends vs Friends	PS5, XBX/S		Deck building, FPS	Brainwash Gang	Raw Fury	
September 1	Infinity Bullets	iOS, DROID		Shoot 'em up	HexaDrive		
September 1	Mythwrecked: Ambrosia Island	PS4, PS5		Adventure	Polygon Treehouse	Whitethorn Games	
September 2	Metal Eden	WIN, PS5, XBX/S		FPS	Reikon Games	Deep Silver	
September 2	Scar-Lead Salvation	XBX/S		Roguelike, TPS	Compile Heart, Neilo	Idea Factory International	
September 3	Black Lily’s Tale (WW)	iOS, DROID	Port	Dating sim, Visual novel	1000-REKA	1000-REKA, mirai works	
September 3	Hirogami	WIN, PS5		Platformer, Action-adventure	Bandai Namco Studios Singapore	Kakehashi Games	
September 4	Adventure of Samsara	WIN, OSX, LIN, NS, PS4, PS5, XBO, XBX/S		Metroidvania, Action-adventure	Ilex Games	Atari	
September 4	Dark Deity 2	NS	Port	Tactical RPG	Sword & Axe	indie.io	
September 4	Fling to the Finish	NS, PS4, PS5, XBO, XBX/S		Party, Racing	SplitSide Games	Daedalic Entertainment	
September 4	Forsaken 64	NS, NS2	Port	Shooter	Iguana UK	Acclaim Entertainment	
September 4	Hell Is Us	WIN, PS5, XBX/S	Original	Action-adventure	Rogue Factor	Nacon	
September 4	Hollow Knight: Silksong	WIN, OSX, LIN, NS, NS2, PS4, PS5, XBO, XBX/S	Original	Metroidvania	Team Cherry		
September 4	Kejora	WIN		Puzzle-platformer	Berangin Creative	Soft Source Publishing	
September 4	Kemono Teatime	WIN, NS		Adventure, CMS	Studio Lalala		
September 4	The King of Fighters AFK	iOS, DROID		Fighting	Netmarble		
September 4	Magical Vacation (JP)	NS, NS2		RPG	Brownie Brown	Nintendo	
September 4	Mandragora: Whispers of the Witch Tree	NS		Action RPG	Primal Game Studio	Knights Peak	
September 4	Opus: Echo of Starsong – Full Bloom Edition	PS5		Visual novel, Adventure	Sigono		
September 4	Splatterbot	WIN, NS		Party	Hey! Kookaburra		
September 4	Star Wars Outlaws	NS2	Port	Action-adventure	Massive Entertainment	Ubisoft	
September 4	Touhou: Scarlet Curiosity	NS		Action RPG	Ankake Spa	Phoenixx	
September 4	Void Crew	PS5, XBX/S		Action	Hutlihut Games	Focus Entertainment	
September 5	Cronos: The New Dawn	WIN, OSX, NS2, PS5, XBX/S	Original	Survival horror	Bloober Team		
September 5	Daemon X Machina: Titanic Scion	WIN, NS2, PS5, XBX/S	Original	Action	Marvelous First Studio	Marvelous	
September 5	Everybody's Golf Hot Shots	WIN, NS, PS5	Original	Sports	HYDE	Bandai Namco Entertainment	
September 5	Infestation: Origins	WIN	Full release	Horror	Nightmare Forge Games		
September 5	NBA 2K26	WIN, NS, NS2, PS4, PS5, XBO, XBX/S	Original	Sports	Visual Concepts	2K	
September 5	Psycho Dream	WIN, NS, PS4, PS5, XBO, XBX/S		Platformer, Action-adventure	Edia	Shinyuden, Ratalaika Games	
September 5	Shuten Order	WIN, NS		Adventure	Too Kyo Games, Neilo	JP: DMM Games; WW: Spike Chunsoft	
September 5	Tokyo Underground Killer	WIN		Action	Phoenix Game Productions	3DM Games, Gone Shootin	
September 9	Backyard Football '99	WIN, iOS, DROID		Sports	Mega Cat Studios	Playground Productions	
September 9	Bubsy in: The Purrfect Collection	WIN, NS, PS5, XBX/S		Platformer	Limited Run Games	Atari	
September 9	Call of the Sea	NS		Adventure	Out of the Blue	Raw Fury	
September 9	Dragon Ball: Gekishin Squadra	WIN, NS, PS4, PS5, iOS, DROID		MOBA	Ganbarion	Bandai Namco Entertainment	
September 9	Road to Empress	WIN, iOS, DROID		Interactive film	New One Studio	New One Studio, Ariel, Sixjoy Hong Kong Limited	
September 10	Garfield Kart 2: All You Can Drift	WIN, NS, PS5, XBX/S		Racing (kart)	Eden Games	Microids	
September 10	Karma: The Dark World	XBX/S		Horror (psych)	Pollard Studio	Wired Productions	
September 10	Shape of Dreams	WIN		Action, Roguelike, MOBA	Lizard Smoothie	Neowiz	
September 10	Yurukill: The Calumniation Games	XBX/S		Shoot 'em up, Visual novel	G.rev	IzanagiGames	
September 12	Borderlands 4	WIN, PS5, XBX/S	Original	FPS	Gearbox Software	2K	
September 12	Gloomy Eyes	WIN, NS, PS5, XBX/S		Adventure, Puzzle	Fishing Cactus, Atlas V, 3dar, Be Revolution Gaming	ARTE France, Untold Tales	
September 12	Marvel Rivals	PS4	Port	Hero shooter	NetEase Games		
September 12	NHL 26	PS5, XBX/S	Original	Sports	EA Vancouver	Electronic Arts	
September 12	Roman Sands RE:Build	WIN, NS, PS4, PS5, XBO, XBX/S		Adventure, Puzzle, Visual novel	Arbitrary Metric	Serenity Forge	
September 12	Storm Lancers	NS		Action, Roguelike	ProbablyMonsters		
September 15	Lego Voyagers	WIN, NS, NS2, PS4, PS5, XBX/S	Original	Puzzle-platformer	Light Brick Studio	Annapurna Interactive	
September 15	Little Witch in the Woods	WIN, OSX	Full release	Life sim	Sunny Side Up		
September 15	Troublemaker 2: Beyond Dream	WIN		Action-adventure, Brawler	Gamecom Team	indie.io	
September 16	Football Heroes League	WIN, NS, PS4, PS5, XBO, XBX/S	Full release	Sports	Run Games		
September 16	Henry Halfhead	WIN, NS, PS5		Sandbox, Adventure	Lululu Entertainment		
September 16	Slime Heroes	PS4, PS5		Action-adventure	Pancake Games	Whitethorn Games	
September 17	Deep Rock Galactic: Survivor	WIN, XBX/S	Full release	Bullet heaven	Funday Games	Ghost Ship Publishing	
September 17	Lost Skies	WIN	Full release	Survival, Adventure	Bossa Games	Humble Games	
September 17	Strange Antiquities	WIN, NS		Puzzle, Simulation	Bad Viking	Iceberg Interactive	
September 17	Type-NOISE: Shonen Shojo	WIN		Adventure, Visual novel	Dank Hearts	WhisperGames	
September 18	Class of Heroes 3 Remaster	WIN, NS, PS5	Remaster	RPG, Dungeon crawl	Acquire	JP: Acquire; WW: PQube	
September 18	Dying Light: The Beast	WIN, PS5, XBX/S	Original	Action-adventure, Survival horror	Techland		
September 18	Easy Delivery Co.	WIN		Vehicle sim	Sam C.	Oro Interactive	
September 18	Formula Legends	WIN, NS, PS4, PS5, XBO, XBX/S		Racing	3DClouds		
September 18	Frostpunk 2	PS5, XBX/S		City builder, Survival	11 Bit Studios		
September 18	Fruitimo!	WIN		Action-adventure	PLANETA		
September 18	Goblin Cleanup	WIN	Early access	Simulation	Crisalu Games	Team17	
September 18	HYKE: Northern Light(s)	WIN, NS, PS5		Action RPG	Blast Edge Games	Akatsuki Games, Aniplex	
September 18	Illusion of Itehari (WW)	NS		Visual novel	LicoBiTs	Aksys Games	
September 18	Jelly Troops	WIN, OSX, NS		RTS	Nukenin	Phoenixx	
September 18	Monkarufanta: The Hero and the Crystal Girl (JP)	NS		Dungeon crawl	Experience		
September 18	Moros Protocol	WIN	Original	Roguelike, FPS	Pixel Reign	Super Rare Originals	
September 18	Platypus Reclayed	WIN, OSX, NS, PS4, PS5, XBO, XBX/S	Remake	Scrolling shooter (horizontal)	Claymatic Games		
September 18	Puzzle Quest: Immortal Edition	WIN, NS, PS4, PS5, XBO, XBX/S	Remaster	Puzzle	Infinity Plus Two	505 Games	
September 18	QQQbeats!!!	NS		Rhythm, Puzzle	Taito		
September 18	The Quintessential Princesses: Fantasy, the Abyss, and the Magic Academy (JP)	NS, PS4, PS5		RPG	Mages		
September 18	Seven Knights Re:Birth (WW)	WIN, iOS, DROID	Remake	RPG	Netmarble Nexus	Netmarble	
September 18	Tenshi no Uta: Shiroki Tsubasa no Inori (JP)	NS		RPG	Edia		
September 18	Wobbly Life	WIN, NS, PS4, PS5, XBO, XBX/S	Full release	Simulation	RubberBandGames	Curve Games	
September 19	Marisa of Liartop Mountain	WIN, NS		Adventure, RPG	Unknown X	Alliance Arts	
September 19	Towa and the Guardians of the Sacred Tree	WIN, NS, PS5, XBX/S		Roguelike, Action-adventure	Brownies	Bandai Namco Entertainment	
September 19	Trails in the Sky 1st Chapter	WIN, NS, NS2, PS5	Remake	RPG	Nihon Falcom	JP: Nihon Falcom; NA: GungHo Online Entertainment	
September 19	Viractal	WIN	Early access	RPG	Sting		
September 23	Baby Steps	WIN, PS5	Original	Walking sim, Adventure	Gabe Cuzzillo, Maxi Boch, Bennett Foddy	Devolver Digital	
September 23	Blippo+	WIN, NS		Simulation, Interactive film	Noble Robot	Panic	
September 23	Forgive Me Father 2	PS5, XBX/S		FPS	Byte Barrel	Fulqrum Publishing	
September 23	Islets	PS4, PS5		Metroidvania, Action-adventure	Kyle Thompson	Top Hat Studios	
September 23	Slime Rancher 2	WIN, PS5, XBX/S	Full release	Farming	Monomi Park		
September 23	Wizordum	NS, PS4, PS5, XBO, XBX/S		FPS	Emberheart Games	Apogee Entertainment	
September 24	Blade & Soul Heroes (WW)	WIN, iOS, DROID		MMO, RPG	NCSoft		
September 24	Jump+ Jumble Rush	iOS, DROID		Tower defense	Bandai Namco Entertainment		
September 25	9 R.I.P. sequel (JP)	NS	Original	Otome, Visual novel	Otomate	Idea Factory	
September 25	Aquapazza: Aquaplus Dream Match	WIN		Fighting	Aquaplus	Shiravune, DMM Games	
September 25	Ayasa: Shadows of Silence	WIN		Puzzle-platformer, Horror	Aya Games		
September 25	Fire Emblem Shadows	iOS, DROID	Original	Social deduction, RTS	Intelligent Systems, DeNA	Nintendo	
September 25	Hades II	WIN, OSX, NS, NS2	Full release	Roguelike, Action RPG	Supergiant Games		
September 25	Klonoa: Empire of Dreams	NS, NS2	Port	Puzzle-platformer	Now Production	JP: Namco; NA: Namco Hometek; EU/AU: Infogrames	
September 25	The Legend of Dark Witch Episode 4	NS	Port	Action	Inside System		
September 25	Mamorukun ReCurse!	WIN, NS, PS4, PS5, XBX/S	Remaster	Shoot 'em up	G.rev, City Connection	City Connection, Clear River Games	
September 25	Mr. Driller 2	NS, NS2		Puzzle	Namco	JP: Namco; NA: Namco Hometek; EU/AU: Infogrames	
September 25	Republic of Pirates	PS5, XBX/S	Port	City builder, RTS	Crazy Goat Games	PQube	
September 25	ROAD59: A Yakuza's Last Stand	WIN, NS		Visual novel	Rocket Studio	Bushiroad Games	
September 25	Silent Hill f	WIN, PS5, XBX/S	Original	Survival horror	NeoBards Entertainment	Konami Digital Entertainment	
September 25	Sonic Racing: CrossWorlds	WIN, NS, PS4, PS5, XBO, XBX/S	Original	Racing (kart)	Sonic Team	Sega	
September 25	Sworn	WIN, NS, PS5, XBX/S	Full release	Action, Roguelike	Windwalk Games	Team17	
September 25	Tokyo Xtreme Racer	WIN	Full release	Racing	Genki		
September 25	The Touryst: Deluxe	NS2		Action-adventure	Shin'en Multimedia		
September 26	Atelier Resleriana: The Red Alchemist & the White Guardian	WIN, NS, PS4, PS5		RPG	Gust	Koei Tecmo	
September 26	Cladun X3 (WW)	WIN, NS, PS4, PS5		Action RPG	Nippon Ichi Software	NIS America	
September 26	CloverPit	WIN	Original	Roguelike, Horror (psych)	Panik Arcade	Future Friends Games	
September 26	EA Sports FC 26	WIN, NS, NS2, PS4, PS5, XBO, XBX/S	Original	Sports	EA Vancouver, EA Romania	Electronic Arts	
September 26	Hotel Barcelona	WIN, PS5, XBX/S		Action, Roguelike	White Owls	Cult Games	
September 26	Pac-Man World 2 Re-Pac	WIN, NS, NS2, PS4, PS5, XBO, XBX/S	Remake	Platformer	Now Production	Bandai Namco Entertainment	
September 28	Mind Diver	WIN	Original	Adventure	Indoor Sunglasses	Playism	
September 29	Unyielder	WIN, LIN		Roguelike, FPS, Action	TrueWorld Studios	Shueisha Games	
September 30	Alien: Rogue Incursion Evolved Edition	WIN, PS5, XBX/S	(non-VR) Port	Survival horror, FPS	Survios		
September 30	Final Fantasy Tactics: The Ivalice Chronicles	WIN, NS, NS2, PS4, PS5, XBX/S	Remaster	Tactical RPG	Square Enix		
September 30	Lego Party	WIN, NS, PS4, PS5, XBO, XBX/S	Original	Party	SMG Studio	Fictions	
September 30	Nicktoons & The Dice of Destiny	WIN, NS, PS5, XBX/S		Action RPG	Fair Play Labs, Petit Fabrik	GameMill Entertainment	
September 30	Train Sim World 6	WIN, PS4, PS5, XBO, XBX/S		Vehicle sim (train)	Dovetail Games		

=== October–December ===
Release date	Title	Platform	Type	Genre	Developer	Publisher	Ref.
October 1	Magical Delicacy	PS4, PS5		Platformer, Cooking	Skaule	Whitethorn Games	
October 2	Candy Rangers	WIN, NS, PS4, PS5, XBO, XBX/S		Shoot 'em up (rail)	Mechano	JanduSoft	
October 2	Ghost of Yōtei	PS5	Original	Action-adventure	Sucker Punch Productions	Sony Interactive Entertainment	
October 2	Mahoutsukai no Yome: Seika no Maboroshi to Yumemiru Tabiji (JP)	WIN, NS, PS5		Visual novel	Mebius	Bushiroad Games	
October 2	Super Mario Galaxy + Super Mario Galaxy 2	NS	Remaster, Compilation	Platformer, Action-adventure	Nintendo		
October 3	Castle of Heart: Retold	WIN, NS, PS5, XBX/S		Action-adventure	7Levels		
October 3	Digimon Story: Time Stranger	WIN, PS5, XBX/S		RPG	Media.Vision	Bandai Namco Entertainment	
October 5	A Wild Last Boss Appeared! Black-Winged Survivor	WIN, NS, PS4, PS5		Roguelike, Arena shooter	Rocket Studio	Sunsoft	
October 7	Sonic Wings Reunion (WW)	NS, PS4, PS5		Scrolling shooter (vertical)	Success	Red Art Games	
October 7	Battle Suit Aces	WIN, OSX, NS, PS5		DCCG, RPG	Trinket Studios	Trinket Studios, Outersloth	
October 7	King of Meat	WIN, PS5, XBX/S	Original	Action	Glowmade	Amazon Games	
October 7	Lethal Honor: Order of the Apocalypse	WIN, PS5, XBX/S		Roguelike, Hack and slash	Viral Studios	HandyGames	
October 7	Little Rocket Lab	WIN, XBO, XBX/S		Simulation	Teenage Astronauts	No More Robots	
October 8	Finding Paradise	PS5, XBO, XBX/S		Adventure	Freebird Games	Serenity Forge	
October 8	Heroic Songs: The Remix!	WIN		City builder, Simulation	Emma Create	Frontier Works	
October 9	Absolum	WIN, NS, PS4, PS5		Brawler	Guard Crush Games, Supamonks	Dotemu	
October 9	Obakeidoro 2: Chase & Seek	NS2		Action	Free Style		
October 9	Blue Protocol: Star Resonance	WIN, iOS, DROID	Original	MMO, RPG	Bokura	A Plus Japan	
October 9	Bye Sweet Carole	WIN, NS, PS5, XBX/S		Horror, Adventure	Little Sewing Machine	Maximum Entertainment	
October 9	Cthulhu Mythos ADV Lunatic Whispers & The Isle Of Ubohoth (JP)	NS, PS4, PS5	Compilation	Visual novel, RPG	Gotcha Gotcha Games		
October 9	LAPIN	NS, PS4, PS5		Platformer	Studio Doodal	CFK, Flux Games	
October 9	Lost Eidolons: Veil of the Witch	WIN, NS, PS5, XBX/S	Full release	Tactical RPG	Ocean Drive Studio	Kakao Games	
October 9	Panty Party Perfect	PS4, PS5		Action	Animu Game	Cosen	
October 9	Rise Eterna II	WIN, NS, PS4, PS5, XBO, XBX/S		Tactical RPG	Makee Games, Ricci Cedric Design	Forever Entertainment	
October 9	Trickcal: Chibi Go (WW)	iOS, DROID		RPG	Epid Games	Bilibili Game	
October 9	Wizard101	PS4, PS5, XBO, XBX/S		MMO, RPG	KingsIsle Entertainment		
October 9	Yooka-Replaylee	WIN, NS2, PS5, XBX/S	Remake	Platformer	Playtonic Games	Playtonic Friends, PM Studios	
October 10	Battlefield 6	WIN, PS5, XBX/S	Original	FPS	Battlefield Studios (Note: Battlefield Studios is a collective branding used for DICE, Ripple Effect Studios, Motive Studio and Criterion Games.)	Electronic Arts	
October 10	Disgaea 7 Complete (WW)	NS2		Tactical RPG	Nippon Ichi Software	NIS America	
October 10	Dreams of Another	WIN, PS5		Action-adventure	Q-Games		
October 10	Little Nightmares Enhanced Edition	WIN, NS2, PS5, XBX/S	Remaster	Puzzle-platformer, Survival horror	Tarsier Studios, Engine Software		
October 10	Little Nightmares III	WIN, NS, NS2, PS4, PS5, XBO, XBX/S	Original	Puzzle-platformer, Survival horror	Supermassive Games	Bandai Namco Entertainment	
October 10	PixelJunk Eden 2	WIN, PS4, PS5		Platformer, Puzzle	Q-Games		
October 10	Scurge: Hive	WIN, NS, PS4, PS5, XBO, XBX/S		Action-adventure	Orbital Media	Ratalaika Games, Shinyuden	
October 10	Snoopy & The Great Mystery Club	WIN, NS, PS5, XBX/S		Adventure	Cradle Games	GameMill Entertainment	
October 10	Ys vs. Trails in the Sky: Alternative Saga (WW)	WIN, NS, PS4, PS5		Fighting	Nihon Falcom	Refint/games	
October 14	Chickenhare and the Treasure of Spiking Beard	WIN, NS, PS4, PS5, XBX/S		Action-adventure, Platformer	N-Zone		
October 14	Decision: Red Daze	PS5, XBX/S		Action RPG	FlyAnvil	Nordcurrent	
October 14	Just Dance 2026 Edition	NS, PS5, XBX/S	Original	Rhythm	Ubisoft Paris	Ubisoft	
October 14	NASCAR 25	PS5, XBX/S	Original	Racing (sim)	Monster Games	iRacing	
October 15	Ball x Pit	WIN, OSX, NS, PS5, XBX/S	Original	Survival, Roguelike	Kenny Sun	Devolver Digital	
October 15	Cuffbust	WIN		Action, Escape room	Two Star Games		
October 16	Amanda the Adventurer 2	NS, PS4, PS5, XBO, XBX/S	Port	Horror	MANGLEDmaw Games	DreadXP	
October 16	Blood West	PS5, XBX/S		Stealth, FPS	Hyperstrange	New Blood Interactive	
October 16	Escape from Duckov	WIN, OSX		Shoot 'em up, Looter shooter	Team Soda	bilibili	
October 16	Ghost Traveler: Adventures in Edo	WIN, NS		Visual novel	Success		
October 16	Overthrown	WIN, PS5, XBX/S	Full release	City builder	Brimstone Games	Maximum Entertainment	
October 16	Pax Dei	WIN	Full release	Sandbox, MMO	Mainframe Industries	Mainframe Industries, New Tales	
October 16	Pokémon Legends: Z-A	NS, NS2	Original	Action RPG, Monster tamer	Game Freak	JP: The Pokémon Company; WW: Nintendo	
October 16	Starbites (JP)	NS, PS5, XBX/S		RPG	IKINAGAMES	Happinet	
October 17	KAKU: Ancient Seal	PS5, XBX/S		Action-adventure	BINGOBELL	Microids	
October 17	Keeper	WIN, XBX/S	Original	Adventure	Double Fine	Xbox Game Studios	
October 17	Lumo 2	WIN, LIN, NS, PS5		Puzzle-platformer, Adventure	Triple Eh?	Numskull Games	
October 19	Stella Sora	WIN, DROID, iOS		RPG	Yostar		
October 21	Fantasy Maiden Wars: Dream of the Stray Dreamer (WW)	WIN		Tactical RPG	Sanbondo	Phoenixx	
October 21	Jurassic World Evolution 3	WIN, PS5, XBX/S	Original	CMS	Frontier Developments		
October 21	Ninja Gaiden 4	WIN, PS5, XBX/S	Original	Action-adventure	Team Ninja, PlatinumGames	Xbox Game Studios	
October 21	Painkiller	WIN, PS5, XBX/S		FPS	Anshar Studios	3D Realms	
October 21	RV There Yet?	WIN	Original	Adventure	Nuggets Entertainment		
October 21	Vampire: The Masquerade – Bloodlines 2	WIN, PS5, XBX/S	Original	Action RPG	The Chinese Room	Paradox Interactive	
October 22	Chaos Zero Nightmare	WIN, iOS, DROID		Action RPG, Deck building, Rougelike	Super Creative	Smilegate	
October 22	Dispatch	WIN, PS5	Original	Adventure	AdHoc Studio		
October 22	The Good Old Days	NS		Metroidvania, Action-adventure	Yokogo Systems	Aksys Games	
October 22	The Good Old Days	WIN, LIN		Metroidvania, Action-adventure	Yokogo Systems	Gravity Game Arise	
October 23	Angry Video Game Nerd 8-bit	WIN, NS, PS4, PS5, XBO, XBX/S, NES	Original	Platformer, Action-adventure	Mega Cat Studios	Retroware	
October 23	Bloodshed	NS, PS4, PS5, XBO, XBX/S		Roguelike, FPS	com8com1 Software	Headup Games	
October 23	Bounty Star: The Morose Tale of Graveyard Clem	WIN, PS5, XBX/S		Action	Dinogod	Annapurna Interactive	
October 23	Double Dragon Revive	WIN, NS, PS4, PS5, XBO, XBX/S		Brawler	Yuke's	Arc System Works	
October 23	Dreamed Away	WIN, OSX, LIN, NS, XBO, XBX/S		Action-adventure, RPG	Nicolas Petton	Pineapple Works	
October 23	Full Metal Schoolgirl	WIN, NS2, PS5		Action, TPS	Yuke's	D3 Publisher	
October 23	Instruments of Destruction	PS5, XBX/S		Simulation	Radiangames	Secret Mode	
October 23	The Jackbox Party Pack 11	WIN, NS, PS4, PS5, XBO, XBX/S		Party	Jackbox Games		
October 23	The Lonesome Guild	WIN, PS5, XBX/S		Action RPG	Tiny Bull Studios	Don't Nod	
October 23	Night Striker GEAR	WIN, NS		Shoot 'em up	M2		
October 23	Once Upon a Katamari (JP)	WIN, NS, PS5, XBX/S		Puzzle, Action	RENGAME	Bandai Namco Entertainment	
October 23	Persona 3 Reload	NS2	Port	RPG	P-Studio	Atlus	
October 23	Plants vs. Zombies: Replanted	WIN, NS, NS2, PS4, PS5, XBO, XBX/S	Remaster	Tower defense	PopCap Games	Electronic Arts	
October 23	PowerWash Simulator 2	WIN, NS2, PS5, XBX/S	Original	Simulation	FuturLab		
October 23	Escape the Backrooms	WIN	Full release	Horror, Adventure	Fancy Games	Secret Mode	
October 23	Tormented Souls II	WIN, PS5, XBX/S	Original	Survival horror	Dual Effect	PQube	
October 23	Utawarerumono: Zan	WIN		Action RPG, Hack and slash	Aquaplus	Shiravune, DMM Games	
October 24	Black Lily’s Tale (WW)	WIN	Rerelease	Dating sim, Visual novel	1000-REKA	1000-REKA, mirai works	
October 24	Chicken Run: Eggstraction	WIN, NS, PS4, PS5, XBO, XBX/S		Action-adventure	Aardman Animations	Outright Games	
October 24	Fast & Furious: Arcade Edition	NS, PS5, XBX/S		Racing	Cradle Games, Raw Thrills	GameMill Entertainment	
October 24	The House of the Dead 2: Remake	PS4, PS5, XBO, XBX/S	Remake	Shoot 'em up (rail)	MegaPixel Studio	Forever Entertainment	
October 24	Loopers Plus (JP)	WIN		Visual novel	Key	Visual Arts	
October 24	Once Upon a Jester	PS5, XBX/S		Adventure	Bonte Avond	Crunching Koalas	
October 24	Once Upon a Katamari (WW)	WIN, NS, PS5, XBX/S		Puzzle, Action	RENGAME	Bandai Namco Entertainment	
October 24	Slots & Daggers	WIN, OSX		Roguelike	Friedemann	Future Friends Games	
October 24	Zoochosis	XBO, XBX/S		Survival horror	Clapperheads		
October 27	Beneath	WIN		Horror, FPS	Camel 101	Wired Productions	
October 27	Dementium: The Ward	WIN		Horror, FPS	atooi		
October 27	Escape Simulator 2	WIN, OSX		Puzzle	Pine Studio		
October 27	Motionrec	WIN		Puzzle, Action	Handsum	Playism	
October 27	The Séance of Blake Manor	WIN, LIN	Original	Adventure, Puzzle	Spooky Doorway	Raw Fury	
October 28	1998: The Toll Keeper Story	WIN, DROID	Original	Narrative adventure, Simulation	GameChanger Studio	GameChanger Studio, CC_Games, Beep Japan Inc.	
October 28	Ball x Pit	NS2	Port	Survival, Roguelike	Kenny Sun	Devolver Digital	
October 28	Battlefield REDSEC	WIN, PS5, XBX/S	Original	Battle royale	DICE	Electronic Arts	
October 28	Beneath	PS5, XBX/S		Horror, FPS	Camel 101	Wired Productions	
October 28	Death By Scrolling	WIN, OSX, LIN		Roguelike, RPG	Terrible Toybox	MicroProse	
October 28	Duet Night Abyss	WIN, iOS, DROID		Action RPG	Pan Studio	Hero Games	
October 28	Halls of Torment	PS5, XBX/S		Action, Roguelike, Bullet heaven	Chasing Carrots		
October 28	Hyperdimension Neptunia Re;Birth1 Plus (WW)	PS4		RPG	Compile Heart	Idea Factory International	
October 28	Hyperdimension Neptunia Re;Birth2: Sisters Generation (WW)	PS4		RPG	Compile Heart	Idea Factory International	
October 28	Hyperdimension Neptunia Re;Birth3: V Generation (WW)	PS4		RPG	Compile Heart	Idea Factory International	
October 28	Ire: A Prologue	WIN		Horror	ProbablyMonsters		
October 28	Silly Polly Beast	WIN, PS4, PS5, XBO, XBX/S		Survival, Action, Horror	Anji Games	Top Hat Studios	
October 28	Simon the Sorcerer Origins	WIN, OSX, LIN, NS, PS4, PS5, XBO, XBX/S	Original	PCA	Smallthing Studios	ININ Games	
October 28	TCG Card Shop Simulator	XBO, XBX/S	Port	Simulation	OPNeon Games		
October 28	Two Point Museum	NS2		Business sim	Two Point Studios	Sega	
October 28	Wreckreation	WIN, PS5, XBX/S		Racing	Three Fields Entertainment	THQ Nordic	
October 29	Earth vs Mars	WIN		TBS	Relic Entertainment		
October 29	The Outer Worlds 2	WIN, PS5, XBX/S	Original	Action RPG	Obsidian Entertainment	Xbox Game Studios	
October 30	ARC Raiders	WIN, PS5, XBX/S		Extraction shooter	Embark Studios		
October 30	Asterix & Obelix: Mission Babylon	WIN, NS, PS5, XBX/S		Adventure, Platformer	Microids		
October 30	Da Capo Re:tune	WIN, NS		Visual novel	Circus	Bushiroad Games	
October 30	DevilConnection	WIN, OSX	Original	Adventure	ChaoGames		
October 30	Dragon Quest I & II HD-2D Remake	WIN, NS, NS2, PS5, XBX/S	Remake, Compilation	RPG	Artdink, Square Enix	Square Enix	
October 30	Harvest Moon: Home Sweet Home Special Edition	WIN, NS, PS5, XBX/S		Farming	appci	Natsume Inc.	
October 30	Majogami	WIN, NS, NS2		Platformer, Action-adventure	Inti Creates		
October 30	Mortal Kombat: Legacy Kollection	WIN, NS, NS2, PS4, PS5, XBO, XBX/S	Compilation	Fighting	Digital Eclipse	Atari	
October 30	Stray Children (WW)	WIN, NS		RPG	Onion Games		
October 30	Virtua Fighter 5 R.E.V.O. World Stage	PS5, XBX/S	Port	Fighting	Ryu Ga Gotoku Studio	Sega	
October 31	Flesh Made Fear	WIN	Original	Survival horror	Tainted Pact Games	Assemble Entertainment	
October 31	Tales of Xillia Remastered	WIN, NS, PS5, XBX/S	Remaster	Action RPG	Dokidoki Grooveworks	Bandai Namco Entertainment	
November 4	1000xResist	PS5, XBX/S		Adventure	Sunset Visitor	Fellow Traveller	
November 4	Age of Empires IV: Anniversary Edition	PS5	Port	RTS	World's Edge, Relic Entertainment	Xbox Game Studios	
November 4	Cling to Darkness	WIN		Horror, Adventure	Lizardry	Playism	
November 4	Europa Universalis V	WIN	Original	Grand strategy	Paradox Tinto	Paradox Interactive	
November 4	Football Manager 26	WIN, OSX, PS5, XBO, XBX/S, iOS, DROID	Original	Sports management	Sports Interactive	Sega	
November 4	Satisfactory	PS5, XBX/S	Port	Factory sim, Sandbox	Coffee Stain Studios	Coffee Stain Publishing	
November 5	Aeruta	WIN	Full release	Action RPG, Life sim	FromDawn Games	Gravity Game Arise	
November 5	Biped 2	WIN, NS, PS4, PS5, XBO, XBX/S		Puzzle	NExT Studios	META Publishing	
November 5	Dead Static Drive	WIN, XBO, XBX/S		Action-adventure, Survival horror	Reuben Games		
November 5	The Fable: Manga Build Roguelike	WIN, NS		Deck building (roguelike)	Mono Entertainment	Kodansha	
November 5	Second Sun	WIN		FPS, RPG	Grey Wolf Entertainment	Iceberg Interactive	
November 5	Sonic Rumble	WIN, iOS, DROID	Original	Party, Battle royale	Sega, Sonic Team	Sega	
November 6	Amanda the Adventurer 3	WIN	Original	Horror	MANGLEDmaw Games	DreadXP	
November 6	ACA NeoGeo Selection Vol. 7 (JP)	NS	Compilation	—N/a	Hamster Corporation, SNK	SNK	
November 6	ACA NeoGeo Selection Vol. 8 (JP)	NS	Compilation	—N/a	Hamster Corporation, SNK	SNK	
November 6	Chicken Police: Into the HIVE!	NS		PCA	The Wild Gentlemen	Joystick Ventures	
November 6	Dave the Diver – Nintendo Switch 2 Edition	NS2	Port	Fishing, Adventure	Mintrocket		
November 6	Dinkum	NS		Survival, Life sim	James Bendon	Krafton	
November 6	Hello Kitty and Friends: Freeze Tag Party (WW)	NS	Original	Action	Imagineer	Nighthawk Interactive	
November 6	Honeycomb: The World Beyond	WIN, PS5, XBX/S		Sandbox, Survival	Frozen Way	Snail	
November 6	Hyrule Warriors: Age of Imprisonment	NS2	Original	Hack and slash	AAA Games Studio	Nintendo	
November 6	Magical Craft: Neko to Mahou no Dress (JP)	NS		Simulation, Adventure	syn Sophia	Imagineer	
November 6	Overcooked! 2 – Nintendo Switch 2 Edition	NS2	Port	Simulation	Ghost Town Games	Team17	
November 6	Syberia Remastered	WIN, PS5, XBX/S	Remaster	PCA	Virtuallyz Gaming, Microids Studio Paris	Microids	
November 7	Anima: Gate of Memories I & II Remaster	WIN, PS5, XBX/S	Remaster, Compilation	Action RPG	Anima Project		
November 7	Voidtrain	WIN, XBX/S	Full release	FPS, Survival	HypeTrain Digital		
November 7	Dark Deity 2	PS5, XBX/S	Port	Tactical RPG	Sword & Axe	indie.io	
November 10	Fallout 4: Anniversary Edition	WIN, PS5, XBX/S	Rerelease	Action RPG	Bethesda Game Studios	Bethesda Softworks	
November 10	Surviving Mars: Relaunched	WIN, PS5, XBX/S	Remaster	City builder, Survival	Haemimont Games	Paradox Interactive	
November 10	Reverie in the Moonlight	WIN	Original	Action, Rougelike	Room6 Inc.		
November 10	Telenet Shooting Collection	WIN	Compilation	Shoot 'em up	Telenet Japan, Edia	Edia	
November 10	Verho: Curse of Faces	WIN	Original	Action RPG	Kasur Games	CobraTekku Games	
November 11	Bittersweet Birthday	WIN, OSX, LIN		Action RPG	World Eater Games	Dangen Entertainment	
November 11	Goodnight Universe	WIN, NS, NS2, PS5, XBX/S		Adventure	Nice Dream	Skybound Games	
November 11	Lumines Arise	WIN, PS5		Rhythm, Puzzle	Enhance, Monstars	Enhance	
November 11	Possessor(s)	WIN, PS5	Original	Action-adventure	Heart Machine	Devolver Digital	
November 11	Rue Valley	WIN, NS, PS5, XBX/S		RPG	Emotion Spark Studio	Owlcat Games	
November 11	Sacred 2: Fallen Angel Remaster	WIN, PS5, XBX/S	Remaster	Action RPG	SparklingBit	THQ Nordic	
November 11	Unpetrified: Echoes of Nature	WIN	Original	Adventure	Dreamhunt Studio	Mindscape	
November 11	Wall World 2	WIN	Original	Action, Roguelite, Tower defence	Alawar		
November 12	Million Depth	WIN, OSX		Action, Roguelike	Cyber Space Biotope	Playism	
November 12	Winter Burrow	WIN, NS, XBO, XBX/S		Survival	Pine Creek Games	Noodlecake	
November 13	Anno 117: Pax Romana	WIN, PS5, XBX/S		City builder, RTS	Ubisoft Mainz	Ubisoft	
November 13	Atelier Ryza Secret Trilogy Deluxe Pack	WIN, NS, NS2, PS4, PS5		RPG	Gust	Koei Tecmo	
November 13	Backyard Basketball '01	WIN, iOS, DROID		Sports	Mega Cat Studios	Playground Productions	
November 13	Backyard Hockey '02	WIN		Sports	Mega Cat Studios	Playground Productions	
November 13	Backyard Soccer '98	iOS, DROID		Sports	Mega Cat Studios	Playground Productions	
November 13	Beyblade X: Evobattle	WIN, NS	Original	Action	Groove Box Japan	FuRyu	
November 13	Dragon Ball: Sparking! Zero (JP)	NS, NS2		Fighting	Spike Chunsoft	Bandai Namco Entertainment	
November 13	GIGASWORD	WIN, NS, PS4, PS5, XBO, XBX/S		Action, Puzzle, Metroidvania	Studio Hybrid	Akupara Games	
November 13	Hello Kitty Island Adventure – Nintendo Switch 2 Edition	NS2	Port	Adventure	Sunblink		
November 13	Hitman: Absolution	NS	Port	Stealth, Action	IO Interactive	Feral Interactive	
November 13	Inazuma Eleven: Victory Road	WIN, NS, NS2, PS4, PS5, XBX/S		Sports, RPG	Level-5		
November 13	Mistonia's Hope: The Lost Delight (WW)	NS		Otome, Visual novel	Otomate	Aksys Games	
November 13	Momotaro Dentetsu 2: Anata no Machi mo Kitto Aru (JP)	NS, NS2		Digital tabletop	Konami Digital Entertainment		
November 13	PUBG: Battlegrounds	PS5, XBX/S	Port	Battle royale	PUBG Studios	Krafton	
November 13	Rennsport	WIN, PS5, XBX/S	Full release	Racing (sim)	Teyon, Competition Company	Nacon	
November 13	Yakuza Kiwami	NS2	Port	Action-adventure	Ryu Ga Gotoku Studio	Sega	
November 13	Yakuza Kiwami 2	NS2	Port	Action-adventure	Ryu Ga Gotoku Studio	Sega	
November 14	Call of Duty: Black Ops 7	WIN, PS4, PS5, XBO, XBX/S	Original	FPS	Treyarch, Raven Software	Activision	
November 14	Dragon Ball: Sparking! Zero (WW)	NS, NS2	Port	Fighting	Spike Chunsoft	Bandai Namco Entertainment	
November 14	Monster Hunter Stories	XBO	Port	RPG	Capcom		
November 14	Monster Hunter Stories 2: Wings of Ruin	XBO	Port	RPG	Capcom		
November 14	Videoverse	NS, PS4, PS5, XBO, XBX/S		Narrative adventure	Kinmoku	Ratalaika Games	
November 14	Where Winds Meet (WW)	WIN, PS5	Original	Action-adventure, RPG	Everstone Studio	NetEase Games	
November 15	Escape from Tarkov	WIN	Full release	FPS, Extraction shooter	Battlestate Games		
November 17	The Berlin Apartment	WIN, PS5, XBX/S		Adventure	btf	btf, ByteRockers' Games, Parco Games	
November 17	Forestrike	WIN, NS		Action	Skeleton Crew Studio	Devolver Digital	
November 17	Leaf Blower Co.	WIN	Original	Simulation	LifT Games	Forklift Interactive	
November 17	Resident Evil: Survival Unit	iOS, DROID		RTS	Aniplex, Joycity	Aniplex	
November 18	Kingdoms of the Dump	WIN, OSX, LIN	Original	RPG, Platformer	Roach Games, Dream Sloth Games	Roach Games	
November 18	Marvel's Deadpool VR	Quest	Original	Hack and slash	Twisted Pixel Games	Oculus Studios	
November 18	Morsels	WIN, OSX, NS, PS5, XBX/S		Action, Roguelike	Furcula	Annapurna Interactive	
November 18	SpongeBob SquarePants: Titans of the Tide	WIN, NS2, PS5, XBX/S	Original	Platformer, Adventure	Purple Lamp	THQ Nordic	
November 18	Squirrel with a Gun	NS2	Port	Action-adventure	Dee Dee Creations	Maximum Entertainment	
November 18	Tomb Raider: Definitive Edition	NS, NS2	Port	Action-adventure	Crystal Dynamics	Aspyr	
November 19	Aion 2 (KR, TW)	WIN, iOS, DROID	Original	MMO, RPG	NCSoft		
November 19	Demonschool	WIN, OSX, LIN, NS, PS4, PS5, XBO, XBX/S	Original	Tactical RPG	Necrosoft Games	Ysbyrd Games	
November 20	Astroneer	PS5	Port	Sandbox, Adventure	System Era Softworks		
November 20	CloverPit	XBO, XBX/S	Port	Roguelike, Horror (psych)	Panik Arcade	Future Friends Games	
November 20	Demeo x Dungeons & Dragons: Battlemarked	WIN, PS5		Strategy, Adventure, RPG	Resolution Games		
November 20	Kirby Air Riders	NS2	Original	Racing	Bandai Namco Studios, Sora Ltd.	Nintendo	
November 20	Neon Inferno	WIN, NS, PS4, PS5, XBO, XBX/S		Run and gun, Shooting gallery	Zenovia Interactive	Retroware	
November 20	Outlaws + Handful of Missions: Remaster	WIN, NS, PS4, PS5, XBO, XBX/S	Remaster	FPS	Nightdive Studios, LucasArts	Nightdive Studios, Atari	
November 20	R-Type Delta: HD Boosted	WIN, NS, PS4, PS5, XBX/S		Shoot 'em up	City Connection	JP: City Connection; WW: Clear River Games	
November 20	S.T.A.L.K.E.R. 2: Heart of Chornobyl	PS5	Port	FPS, Survival horror	GSC Game World		
November 20	Silent Hill 2	XBX/S	Port	Survival horror	Bloober Team	Konami Digital Entertainment	
November 20	Total Chaos	WIN, PS5, XBX/S		Horror (psych)	Trigger Happy Interactive	Apogee Entertainment	
November 21	One Piece: Pirate Warriors 4	NS2, PS5, XBX/S		Hack and slash	Omega Force	Bandai Namco Entertainment	
November 21	Terrifier: The ARTcade Game	WIN, NS, PS5, XBX/S		Brawler	Relevo	Selecta Play	
November 24	Constance	WIN		Metroidvania	btf	btf, ByteRockers' Games	
November 24	Dinopunk: The Cacops Adventure	WIN		Platformer	The Dude Games	Meridiem Games	
November 24	Of Ash and Steel	WIN	Original	Action RPG	Fire & Frost	tinyBuild	
November 24	Solo Leveling: Arise Overdrive	WIN	Original	Action RPG	Netmarble Neo	Netmarble	
November 25	A.I.L.A.	WIN, PS5, XBX/S		Survival horror	Pulsatrix Studios	Fireshine Games	
November 25	Kill It with Fire 2	WIN, PS5, XBX/S	Full release	FPS	Casey Donnellan Games	tinyBuild	
November 25	Project Motor Racing	WIN, PS5, XBX/S		Racing (sim)	Straight4 Studios	GIANTS Software	
November 25	Reverie in the Moonlight	WIN		Action, Roguelike	room6		
November 25	Wizard of Legend II	NS		Action, Roguelike	Dead Mage	Humble Games	
November 26	Battletoads (NES)	NS, NS2	Port	Brawler, Platformer	Rare	NA/EU: Tradewest; JP: Masaya	
November 26	Bionic Commando	NS, NS2	Port	Platformer	Minakuchi Engineering	Capcom	
November 26	Detective Instinct: Farewell, My Beloved	WIN, NS		Visual novel, Adventure	Armonica		
November 26	Kid Icarus: Of Myths and Monsters	NS, NS2	Port	Action, Platformer	Nintendo R&D1, Tose	Nintendo	
November 26	Ninja Gaiden II: The Dark Sword of Chaos	NS, NS2	Port	Hack and slash, Platformer	Tecmo		
November 26	The Use of Life	WIN	Full release	RPG	Daraneko Games	Playism	
November 27	Badboy Brother	WIN, NS		Brawler	ZOC	D3 Publisher	
November 27	Bubble Bobble Sugar Dungeons (WW)	WIN, NS, PS5		Platformer, Action-adventure	Taito	Arc System Works	
November 27	Chaos;Head / Chaos;Child Love Chu Chu!! Double Pack (JP)	NS		Visual novel	Mages		
November 27	Heroic Songs: The Remix!	NS		City builder, Simulation	Emma Create	Frontier Works	
November 27	Karous (JP)	NS, PS4, PS5		Scrolling shooter (vertical)	RS34		
November 27	LoveR Kiss: Endless Memories (JP)	WIN, NS		Visual novel	Dragami Games		
November 27	Ripple Island: Kyle and Cal's Restaurant	WIN, NS2		Action	Sunsoft		
November 27	Shuten Order – Nintendo Switch 2 Edition	NS2		Adventure	Too Kyo Games, Neilo	DMM Games	
November 27	Street Racer Collection	WIN, NS, PS4, PS5, XBO, XBX/S	Compilation	Racing (kart)	QUByte Interactive	QUByte Interactive, Piko Interactive	
November 27	Telenet RPG Collection (Note: Includes Dark Kingdom, Hiōden: Mamono-tachi tono Chikai, and The Journey Home: Quest for the Throne.) (JP)	NS	Compilation	RPG	Telenet Japan, Edia	Edia	
November 28	Augment Protocol (JP)	WIN	Original	Visual novel	Key	Visual Arts	
November 28	Harukanaru Toki no Naka de: Ryuuguu no Miko (JP)	iOS, DROID		Otome, Visual novel	Ruby Party	Koei Tecmo	
November 28	Niraya of ■■	WIN		Horror, Adventure	HexaDrive		
December 1	Marvel Cosmic Invasion	WIN, NS, NS2, PS4, PS5, XBO, XBX/S	Original	Brawler	Tribute Games	Dotemu	
December 2	Assassin's Creed Shadows	NS2	Port	Action-adventure, Stealth	Ubisoft Quebec	Ubisoft	
December 2	Sleep Awake	WIN, PS5, XBX/S		Horror (psych)	Eyes Out	Blumhouse Games	
December 2	BROK: The Brawl Bar	NS, PS4, PS5, XBO		PCA, Brawler	COWCAT		
December 2	Kingdom of Night	WIN	Original	Action RPG	Black Seven Studios	Dangen Entertainment	
December 2	Red Dead Redemption	NS2, PS5, XBX/S, iOS, DROID	Port	Action-adventure	Rockstar San Diego, Double Eleven, Cast Iron Games	Rockstar Games	
December 2	Simogo Legacy Collection (Note: Includes Kosmo Spin, Bumpy Road, Beat Sneak Bandit, Year Walk, Device 6, The Sailor's Dream, and SPL-T.)	WIN, LIN, NS, NS2	Compilation		Simogo		
December 3	Let It Die: Inferno	WIN, PS5	Original	Roguelike, Survival, Action	Supertrick Games	GungHo Online Entertainment	
December 3	Monument Valley 3	iOS, DROID	Rerelease	Puzzle	Ustwo Games		
December 4	Blood: Refreshed Supply	WIN, NS, PS4, PS5, XBO, XBX/S	Remaster	FPS	Monolith Productions, Nightdive Studios	Warner Bros. Games, Atari	
December 4	Cloudheim	WIN	Early access	Action RPG	Noodle Cat Games		
December 4	Ferocious	WIN	Original	FPS	Omyog	tinyBuild	
December 4	Football Manager 26	NS	Port	Sports management	Sports Interactive	Sega	
December 4	Run for Money: Hunters vs. Runners! Can You Win as Either? (JP)	NS, NS2		Action	D3 Publisher		
December 4	Metroid Prime 4: Beyond	NS, NS2	Original	Action-adventure	Retro Studios	Nintendo	
December 4	Octopath Traveler 0	WIN, NS, NS2, PS4, PS5, XBX/S	Original	RPG	Square Enix, Dokidoki Grooveworks	Square Enix	
December 4	Old School Rally	WIN, NS, PS4, PS5	Full release	Racing	Frozen Lake Games	Astrolabe Games	
December 4	Routine	WIN, XBO, XBX/S		Survival horror	Lunar Software	Raw Fury	
December 4	Sonic Racing: CrossWorlds	NS2	Port	Racing (kart)	Sonic Team	Sega	
December 4	Thief VR: Legacy of Shadow	WIN, PS5	Original	Stealth	Maze Theory	Vertigo Games	
December 5	Agreeee	WIN	Full release	Puzzle	Bestman		
December 5	Flotsam	WIN	Full release	City builder	Pajama Llama Games	Stray Fawn Publishing	
December 5	Nicktoons & The Dice of Destiny	NS2		Action RPG	Fair Play Labs, Petit Fabrik	GameMill Entertainment	
December 8	Angeline Era	WIN, OSX	Original	Action-adventure	Analgesic Productions		
December 8	Microsoft Flight Simulator 2024	PS5	Port	Vehicle sim (plane)	Asobo Studio	Xbox Game Studios	
December 8	Skate Story	WIN, OSX, NS2, PS5		Adventure, Sports	Sam Eng	Devolver Digital	
December 8	Yakuza 0 Director's Cut	WIN, PS5, XBX/S	Port	Action-adventure	Ryu Ga Gotoku Studio	Sega	
December 8	Yakuza Kiwami	PS5, XBX/S	Port	Action-adventure	Ryu Ga Gotoku Studio	Sega	
December 8	Yakuza Kiwami 2	PS5, XBX/S	Port	Action-adventure	Ryu Ga Gotoku Studio	Sega	
December 9	Death Howl	WIN		Soulslike, Deck building	The Outer Zone	11 Bit Studios	
December 9	The Elder Scrolls V: Skyrim Anniversary Edition	NS2	Port	Action RPG	Bethesda Game Studios	Bethesda Softworks	
December 9	Farming Simulator: Signature Edition	NS2		Simulation	GIANTS Software		
December 9	Planet of Lana	iOS, DROID		Puzzle-platformer	Wishfully	Playdigious	
December 9	Romancing SaGa: Minstrel Song Remastered International	NS, PS4, PS5		RPG	Square Enix, Bullets	Square Enix, Red Art Games	
December 9	Ultimate Sheep Raccoon	WIN, NS, NS2, PS4, PS5, XBO, XBX/S		Party, Racing	Clever Endeavour Games		
December 9	Unbeatable	WIN, PS5, XBX/S	Original	Rhythm, Adventure	D-Cell Games	Playstack	
December 9	Milano's Odd Job Collection (WW)	WIN, NS, NS2, PS4, PS5, XBO, XBX/S		Adventure	Implicit Conversions, Westone	Xseed Games	
December 10	Dogpile	WIN, OSX	Original	Deck building, Roguelite	Studio Folly, Toot Games	WINGS	
December 10	The End of History	WIN	Early access	Sandbox, Tactical RPG	Tatamibeya	WorldMap	
December 10	Little Rocket Lab	NS, NS2		Simulation	Teenage Astronauts	No More Robots	
December 10	Mutant Football League 2	WIN, PS5, XBX/S	Full release	Sports	Digital Dreams Entertainment		
December 10	NeverAwake FLASHBACK	WIN		Shoot 'em up	Neotro	Phoenixx	
December 11	Bluey's Quest for the Gold Pen	OSX, iOS	Original	Adventure	Halfbrick Studios		
December 11	Disney Miraness Fitness (JP/AS)	NS		Fitness	Imagineer		
December 11	Gekisou! BAND STAR (JP)	NS		Rhythm	Digital Works Entertainment	Mages	
December 11	Mamon King	WIN, NS	Original	Raising sim	LiTMUS		
December 11	Neon Clash: Echoes of the Lost (JP)	NS		Otome, Visual novel	AmuLit	Voltage	
December 11	Pioneers of Pagonia	WIN		City Builder	Envision Entertainment		
December 11	Warhammer 40,000: Rogue Trader	NS2	Port	RPG	Owlcat Games		
December 12	Dino Land	WIN, LIN, NS, PS4, PS5, XBO, XBX/S	Port	Pinball	Wolf Team, Edia	Shinyuden, Ratalaika Games	
December 12	Terminator 2D: No Fate	WIN, NS, PS4, PS5, XBO, XBX/S	Original	Action	Bitmap Bureau	Reef Entertainment	
December 15	Divinity: Original Sin II – Definitive Edition	NS2, PS5, XBX/S	Port	RPG	Larian Studios		
December 15	Lonely Mountains: Snow Riders	PS5		Sports	Megagon Industries		
December 15	Tomba! 2: The Evil Swine Return Special Edition	WIN, NS, NS2, PS5	Remaster	Platformer	Whoopee Camp, Limited Run Games	Limited Run Games	
December 16	Aaero2: Black Razor Edition	WIN, PS5		Rhythm, Shoot 'em up (rail)	Mad Fellows	Wired Productions	
December 16	Artdink Game Log: Tail of the Sun (JP)	WIN, NS		Action RPG	Artdink		
December 16	The Rogue Prince of Persia	NS, NS2	Port	Roguelike, Platformer	Evil Empire	Ubisoft	
December 16	Teenage Mutant Ninja Turtles: Splintered Fate – Nintendo Switch 2 Edition	NS2	Port	Roguelike	Super Evil Megacorp		
December 17	CloverPit	iOS, DROID	Port	Roguelike, Horror (psych)	Panik Arcade	Future Friends Games	
December 17	Rayman 2: The Great Escape	NS, NS2	Port	Platformer, Action-adventure	Ubi Pictures	Ubisoft	
December 17	Tonic Trouble	NS, NS2	Port	Platformer, Action-adventure	Ubi Soft Montreal	Ubisoft	
December 18	A-Train: All Aboard! Tourism – Nintendo Switch 2 Edition (JP)	NS2	Port	Business sim	Artdink		
December 18	Astonishia Story (KR)	WIN, NS	Remake	RPG	Netmarble Neo, Waycoder	Daewon Media	
December 18	Beyblade X: Evobattle – Nintendo Switch 2 Edition	NS2	Port	Action	Groove Box Japan	FuRyu	
December 18	Bounty Sisters (JP)	NS	Original	Shoot 'em up	PiXEL		
December 18	HEART of CROWN Online	WIN, NS	Full release	Deck building	illuCalab, FLIPFLOPs	Japanime Games, Playism	
December 18	Yuukyuu Gensoukyoku Ensemble Re:R (JP)	NS		Simulation	Vridge	Taito	
December 18	Olympia Soirée: Catharsis (JP)	NS	Original	Otome, Visual novel	Otomate	Idea Factory	
December 18	Suika Game Planet (JP)	NS, NS2	Original	Puzzle	Aladdin X		
December 18	System Shock	NS, NS2	Port	Action-adventure	Nightdive Studios	Atari	
December 18	Yuukyuu Gensoukyoku Revival (JP)	NS		Simulation	Vridge	Taito	
December 19	Fort Solis	XBX/S	Port	Horror, Adventure	Fallen Leaf, Black Drakkar Games	Feardemic, Dear Villagers	
December 19	Layers of Fear: The Final Masterpiece Edition	NS2	Port	Horror (psych)	Bloober Team		
December 25	Earnest Evans Collection (Note: Includes El Viento, Earnest Evans, and Anett Futatabi.) (JP)	NS	Compilation	Platformer, Action-adventure, Brawler	Wolf Team, Edia	Edia	
December 25	Neon Clash: Echoes of the Lost (WW)	NS		Otome, Visual novel	AmuLit	Voltage	
December 25	Stardew Valley – Nintendo Switch 2 Edition	NS2	Port	Farming	ConcernedApe		
