= Void/Breaker =

2026 video game

- Developer: Stubby Games
- Publisher: Playstack
- Director: Daniel Stubbington
- Engine: Unreal Engine
- Platforms: Windows; PlayStation 5 Xbox Series X and S
- Release: November 4, 2026
- Genre: First-person shooter

Void/Breaker (stylized as VOID/BREAKER) is a roguelite first-person shooter developed by Stubby Games and published by Playstack. Following an early access period for Windows starting in August 2025, version 1.0 released on November 4, 2026, for PlayStation 5, Xbox Series X/S and PC.

== Development ==
Void/Breaker was developed by Stubby Games, the independent studio of solo developer Daniel Stubbington, who previously created the 2022 puzzle game The Entropy Centre.

Community feedback influenced the game's development during early access. The developer incorporated suggestions from testers, including the addition of wall-running.

== Gameplay ==
Void/Breaker is a single-player first-person shooter with roguelite and bullet hell elements. Players attempt to escape a repeating sequence of combat encounters controlled by a hostile artificial intelligence. The game features a weapon customization system that allows players to combine modifications and develop different combat strategies. Walls and other structures can be destroyed to create alternative routes or gain advantages during combat.

== Release ==
Void/Breaker was announced in April 2025 during the Triple-i Initiative showcase, with an accompanying trailer demonstrating its weapon customization and environmental destruction systems. The game was subsequently featured during the PC Gaming Show in June 2025, ahead of its early access release.

The game was released in early access for Windows through Steam and Xbox Game Preview on August 19, 2025. The initial version included three playable zones, four weapons, additional difficulty modes and an endless run mode. It transitioned into version 1.0 on November 4, 2026, launching digitally on Windows, PlayStation 5, and Xbox Series X\S, while also being available on Xbox Game Pass.
