= Elroy and the Aliens =

2025 video game

- Developer: Motiviti
- Publisher: Motiviti
- Producers: Jernej Kocjancic, Danilo Kapel
- Designer: Tadej Gregorčič
- Artist: Urban Breznik Corbillon
- Writer: Tadej Gregorčič
- Composer: Martin Bezjak
- Engine: Unity
- Platforms: Windows, MacOS, Linux
- Release: April 2, 2025
- Genre: Point-and-click adventure
- Mode: Single-player

Elroy and the Aliens is a point-and-click adventure game developed and published by Motiviti in Slovenia. The game was released for Windows, MacOS, and Linux on April 2, 2025. Console ports are planned for a later release.

== Gameplay ==
Elroy and the Aliens is a point-and-click adventure game. The player takes control of the eponymous Elroy, collects items, and talks to NPCs in order to solve puzzles and advance the story. They can unlock new locations and make decisions that change the outcome of the ending.

== Plot ==
The game is set in the year 1993 in a fictional town called Slope City. Elroy, a brilliant rocket engineer whose father vanished under mysterious circumstances 18 years ago, and Peggie, an inquisitive investigative journalist, who has a passion for languages, history, and uncovering the truth, discover a secret and set on an adventure. They leave their quiet hometown of Slope City and go into the far reaches of space, on a quest to find Elroy’s long-lost father. Along the way, they uncover a looming threat that could endanger the very fabric of the universe as they know it.

== Development ==
Elroy and the Aliens was developed by Slovenia-based studio Motiviti, a small independent studio founded by Tadej Gregorčič and Jernej Kocjancic in 2009. The game was announced in July 2021 and was inspired by 90s-era cartoons, LucasArts and Sierra games, as well as classics like Stargate, Indiana Jones, and the Commonwealth Saga. Much of the hand-drawn art and character animation was created by artist and animator Urban Breznik, who served as art director, animator, and lead artist on the project. Tomi Goljevsček joined as lead developer, and Robert Megone joined later as QA and gameplay programmer, who had previously worked on titles such as Return to Monkey Island, The Darkside Detective, and Beyond a Steel Sky.

The game is completely voiced in English and received several subtitle translations by the translator collective Warlocs, with Michael Stein leading the localization project management.

== Reception ==
Reception

Aggregate score
Aggregator	Score
Metacritic	81/100

Review score
Publication	Score
Adventure Gamers	4.5/5

Elroy and the Aliens received "generally favorable" reviews from critics, according to review aggregator platform Metacritic.

In an article for Adventure Gamers, Erik Parkin gave 4.5 out of 5 stars, writing, "Elroy and the Aliens is a charismatic game, filled with hope, love and camaraderie. Serious and comedic themes combine in a fascinating narrative complemented by colorful, whimsical graphics. I recommend Elroy and the Aliens to all adventurers."
