= Forever Skies =

Video game

- Developer: Far From Home
- Publisher: Far From Home
- Engine: Unreal Engine
- Platforms: PlayStation 5; Windows; Xbox Series X/S
- Release: PlayStation 5, Windows; 14 April 2025; Xbox Series X/S; 27 July 2026
- Genre: Survival
- Modes: Single-player, multiplayer

Forever Skies is a survival video game developed and published by Far From Home. It was released in early access for Microsoft Windows via Steam on 22 June 2023. The full version was released on 14 April 2025 alongside the PlayStation 5 version. A version for the Xbox Series X/S was released on 27 July 2026.

== Gameplay ==
Forever Skies is a survival game played from a first-person perspective. Players must craft tools and materials and find food and water to survive whilst customizing an airship that serves as the home base and primary method of travelling the world. Co-operative gameplay with up to four people is also supported.

Set in the future when the Earth has been ravaged, players must find a cure for humanity. There are two mutually exclusive endings, and players can choose to save or fail to save humanity.

== Development and release ==
Far From Home, a polish development studio, announced their debut project Forever Skies in January 2022. The game initially went under the working title Project Oxygen and was scheduled to release on Windows in 2022, with PlayStation 5 and Xbox Series X/S versions scheduled for a later date.

The launch of the game for Windows was delayed to the first half of 2023 due to the developers receiving feedback from the demo and were expanding the game's scope. Forever Skies subsequently launched in early access on Steam on 22 June 2024. Co-operative play was added to the game in the 'World Evolved & Co-op Update'.

The full version was released on 14 April 2025 for Windows via Steam and PlayStation 5. A version for the Xbox Series X/S was released on 27 July 2026.

== Reception ==
Reception

Aggregate scores
Aggregator	Score
Metacritic	(PC) 66/100
OpenCritic	38% recommend

Review scores
Publication	Score
GamingBolt	7/10
IGN Deutschland	8/10
IGN France	5/10

Forever Skies received "mixed or average" reviews from critics, according to review aggregator site Metacritic. Fellow review aggregator OpenCritic assessed that the game received fair approval, being recommended by 38% of critics.

IGN Deutschland rated it 8/10, and wrote: "Forever Skies is essentially a cozy survival game for anyone who values exploration and a dense atmosphere more than a tough and complex survival experience." IGN France rated the game 5/10 and was critical of the repetitive nature of the locations to explore. GamingBolt rated it 7/10 and stated how it offered a "fun narrative survival adventure" whilst describing the combat as "quite boring."

=== Sales ===
On 9 April 2025, Far From Home announced that Forever Skies had sold over 300,000 copies. It has since surpassed 500,000 copies sold.
