= Lonestar (video game) =

2025 roguelike video game

- Developer: Math Tide
- Publisher: Thermite Games
- Platforms: macOS; Windows; Nintendo Switch
- Release: 3 April 2025 (Note: Released in early access 18 January 2024)
- Genre: Roguelike
- Mode: Single-player

Lonestar is a 2025 roguelike video game. Players control a spaceship through a series of turn-based simulated battles, manipulating and powering pieces of weapons and other equipment on their ship to outmatch enemy ships. It was developed as the first game of indie studio Math Tide and published by Thermite Games. It released in early access in January 2024 and fully in April 2025. Reviewers were generally positive on the gameplay, while noting issues with the game's story and presentation.

== Gameplay ==
A battle in Lonestar. Each horizontal lane has an enemy power number, the player has energy resources along the bottom of the interface and a ship with equipment on the left.

Lonestar is a roguelike where the player controls a ship and fights a series of battles against enemy ships. In battle, ships are viewed on a top-down 2D grid a consisting of multiple lanes. The game is played in rounds where the power of the player and enemy ship is compared in each lane, and the ship with less power takes damage. To generate this power, each round the player is given energy resources: each energy resource has a color and a numerical value. The player's ship is equipped with weapons and other equipment that the player can freely place in the grid; equipment has color-coded slots, and players must assign energy of corresponding colors to activate equipment.

Between battles, the player is given the opportunity to acquire new equipment and upgrades for their ship. A run through the game consists of twelve battles divided between three stages, each consisting of three normal enemies and a boss.

== Development and release ==
Lonestar was developed as the first game of Math Tide, a two-person indie studio, and published by Thermite Games. It was released in early access on 18 January 2024, after three years of development. It was fully released on 3 April 2025 for macOS, Windows, and Nintendo Switch.

== Reception ==
Reviewers generally praised Lonestar's gameplay. In a positive review for PC Gamer, Jon Bailes cited "sticky choices and devilish turns". Robin Bea of Inverse described the game as engaging, commenting that the enemies felt unique and that interacting with each enemy's individual traits felt important. PCGamesN's Jamie Hore remarked positively on the variety of content, including ships and pilots, available. Journalist Jason Bennett of the Northwest Arkansas Democrat Gazette described the battles as thrilling and puzzle-like. Chinese publication 3DMGame was less positive, perceiving the game to rely too heavily on randomness as a game design element, and cited what they saw as a discrepancy between the specific solutions demanded by bosses and the randomness of actually acquiring equipment to accomplish that.

Bailes criticized the presentation, describing it as "all a bit dry and short on personality" and the verbiage used in the English translation. 4Gamer's Tsugumo Kaiten described the story as thin.

Lonestar drew comparisons to Cobalt Core (2023) and FTL: Faster Than Light (2012) as similar ship-combat roguelikes.
