= List of role-playing video games: 2024 to 2025 =

All RPGs from 2024 to 2025

This is a comprehensive index of commercial role-playing video games (RPGs), sorted chronologically by year. Information regarding release platform, release type, RPG subgenre, game setting, developers, publishers, and country of origin is provided where available. The table can be sorted by clicking on the small boxes next to the column headings.

This list includes all RPG subgenres, including MMORPGs, Action RPGs and Tactical RPGs. This list does not include MUDs and Roguelikes by default, unless they have an additional RPG subgenre. For standalone lists on these subgenres, see List of MUDs and List of roguelikes

== Legend ==
Video game platforms
DROID	Android	iOS	iOS, iPhone, iPod, iPadOS, iPad, visionOS, Apple Vision Pro	LIN	Linux, SteamOS
NS	Nintendo Switch	NS2	Nintendo Switch 2	OSX	macOS
PS4	PlayStation 4	PS5	PlayStation 5	WIN	Windows, all versions Windows 95 and up
XBO	Xbox One	XBX/S	Xbox Series X/S		

Types of releases
Compilation	A compilation, anthology or collection of several titles, usually (but not always) belonging to the same series
Early access	A game launched in early access is unfinished and thus might contain bugs and glitches or have some of the content missing
Episodic	An episodic video game that is released in batches over a period of time
Expansion	A large-scale DLC to an already existing game that adds new story, areas and additions and/or changes to the game's mechanics
Full release	A full release of a game that launched in early access first
Limited	A special release (often called "Limited" or "Collector's Edition") with bonus collector's material. Often provided to people who pre-order a game
Port	The game first appeared on a different platform and a port was made. The game is like the original, with few or no differences
Remake	The game is an enhanced remake of an original, made using a new engine and/or assets and thus containing completely new sound, graphics and possibly changes to the story and/or gameplay
Remaster	The game is a remaster of an original, released on the same or different platform, with (usually minor) changes to graphics, sound and/or gameplay
Rerelease	The game was re-released on the same platform with no or only minor changes

Video game genres
Action RPG	Action role-playing game	Dungeon crawl	Dungeon crawl	JRPG	Japanese-style role-playing game
MMORPG	Massively multiplayer online RPG	Monster tamer	Monster-taming game	MUD	Multi-user dungeon
Real-time	Real-time game	Roguelike	Roguelike, Roguelite	Sandbox	Sandbox game
Soulslike	Soulslike	Tactical RPG	Tactical role-playing game	Turn-based	Turn-based game

== List ==
Year	Title	Platform	Type	RPG Subgenre	Setting	Developer	Publisher	COO	Ref.
2024	[REDACTED]	WIN, PS5, XBX/S		Roguelike		Striking Distance Studios	Krafton		
2024	#BLUD	WIN, NS, PS4, XBO		Dungeon crawl		Exit 73 Studios	Humble Games		
2024	8-Bit Adventures 2	NS, PS4, PS5, XBO, XBX/S				Critical Games			
2024	Abyss Seeker: What Do You See Deep in The Abyss	WIN		Roguelike		Success			
2024	Ancient Weapon Holly	WIN, NS, PS5, PS4		Roguelike		Acquire	Acquire, Aniplex		
2024	Anomaly Collapse	WIN		Roguelike		RocketPunch Games	Spiral Up Games		
2024	Arco	WIN, OSX, NS				Franek, Max Cahill, Bibiki, Fáyer	Panic		
2024	Astlibra Gaiden: The Cave of Phantom Mist	NS		Action RPG		KEIZO	WhisperGames		
2024	Astor: Blade of the Monolith	WIN, NS, PS4, PS5, XBO, XBX/S		Action RPG		C2 Game Studio	Versus Evil		
2024	Backpack Hero	PS4, PS5, XBO, XBX/S		Roguelike		Jaspel	IndieArk, Different Tales		
2024	Bandle Tale: A League of Legends Story	WIN, NS				Lazy Bear Games	Riot Forge		
2024	Banishers: Ghosts of New Eden	WIN, PS5, XBX/S	Original	Action RPG		Don't Nod	Focus Entertainment		
2024 (JP)	Bar Stella Abyss	NS, PS4, PS5		Roguelike		Nippon Ichi Software			
2024	Baten Kaitos I & II HD Remaster	WIN	Remaster, Compilation			Monolith Soft, logicalbeat	Bandai Namco Entertainment		
2024	Berserk Boy	WIN, NS		Action RPG		BerserkBoy Games			
2024	Biomutant	NS	Port	Action RPG		Experiment 101	THQ Nordic		
2024	Black Myth: Wukong	WIN, PS5	Original	Action RPG		Game Science			
2024	Blade Prince Academy	WIN				Angel Corp	Firesquid		
2024	BlazBlue Entropy Effect	WIN		Roguelike		91Act			
2024	Bleak Faith: Forsaken	PS5, XBX/S		Action RPG		Archangel Studios	Perp Games		
2024	Bloomtown: A Different Story	WIN, NS, PS4, PS5, XBO, XBX/S				Different Sense Games, Lazy Bear Games	Twin Sails Interactive		
2024	Broken Roads	WIN, PS4, PS5, XBO, XBX/S				Drop Bear Bytes	Versus Evil		
2024	C.A.R.D.S. RPG: The Misty Battlefield	WIN, NS, PS4, PS5		Tactical RPG		Acquire			
2024	Card-en-Ciel	WIN, NS, PS4, PS5, XBO, XBX/S				Inti Creates			
2024	Cat Quest III	WIN, NS, PS4, PS5, XBO, XBX/S		Action RPG		The Gentlebros	Kepler Interactive		
2024	Caves of Qud	WIN, OSX, LIN	Full release	Roguelike		Freehold Games	Kitfox Games		
2024	Class of Heroes 2G: Remaster Edition	WIN, NS, PS5	Remaster	Dungeon crawl		Acquire	Acquire, PQube		
2024	Class of Heroes: Anniversary Edition	WIN, NS, PS5	Remake	Dungeon crawl		Acquire	Acquire, PQube		
2024	Creatures of Ava	WIN, XBX/S		Monster tamer		Inverge Studios, Chibig	11 Bit Studios		
2024	Cryptmaster	WIN, PS4, PS5, XBO, XBX/S		Dungeon crawl		Akupara Games			
2024	Crystal Story: Dawn of Dusk	WIN		Action RPG		Bred Frown			
2024 (WW)	Crystar	PS5		Action RPG		Gemdrops	Spike Chunsoft		
2024	Darkest Dungeon II	NS, PS4, PS5, XBO, XBX/S	Port	Dungeon crawl, Roguelike		Red Hook Studios			
2024	Darksiders II: Deathinitive Edition	PS5, XBX/S	Remaster	Action RPG		Gunfire Games	THQ Nordic		
2024 (JP)	Death end re;Quest: Code Z	NS, PS4, PS5		Roguelike		Compile Heart			
2024	Deathbound	WIN, PS5, XBX/S		Action RPG, Soulslike		Trialforge Studio	Tate Multimedia		
2024	Destiny 2: The Final Shape	WIN, PS4, PS5, XBO, XBX/S		Action RPG		Bungie			
2024	Diablo IV: Vessel of Hatred	WIN, PS4, PS5, XBO, XBX/S	Expansion	Action RPG, Dungeon crawl		Blizzard Entertainment			
2024	Dicefolk	WIN, NS		Roguelike		LEAP Game Studios, Tiny Ghoul	Good Shepherd Entertainment		
2024 (JP)	Disgaea 7 Complete	NS, PS4, PS5	Rerelease	Tactical RPG		Nippon Ichi Software			
2024	Disney Pixel RPG	iOS, DROID				GungHo Online Entertainment			
2024 (JP)	Dokapon Ikari no Tetsuken	NS				Sting Entertainment			
2024 (WW)	Dragon Age: The Veilguard	WIN, XBX/S, PS5	Original	Action RPG	Fantasy	BioWare	Electronic Arts	US	
2024	Dragon Ball Xenoverse 2	PS5, XBX/S		Action RPG		Dimps	Bandai Namco Entertainment		
2024	Dragon Quest Builders	WIN		Action RPG, Sandbox		Square Enix			
2024	Dragon Quest III HD-2D Remake	WIN, NS, PS5, XBX/S	Remake			Artdink, Square Enix	Square Enix		
2024	Dragon Quest Monsters: The Dark Prince	WIN, iOS, DROID				Tose	Square Enix		
2024 (WW)	Dragon's Dogma 2	WIN, PS5, XBX/S	Original	Action RPG		Capcom		JP	
2024 (WW)	Dread Delusion	WIN	Original	Action RPG	Fantasy	Lovely Hellplace	DreadXP	UK	
2024	Drova: Forsaken Kin	WIN, LIN, NS, PS4, PS5, XBO, XBX/S		Action RPG		Just2D	Deck13		
2024	Dungeons of Hinterberg	WIN, XBX/S		Action RPG		Microbird	Curve Games		
2024	Dwerve	PS5		Action RPG		Half Human Games	PM Studios		
2024	Eiyuden Chronicle: Hundred Heroes	WIN, NS, PS4, PS5, XBO, XBX/S				Rabbit and Bear Studios	505 Games		
2024	Elden Ring Shadow of the Erdtree	WIN, PS4, PS5, XBO, XBX/S	Expansion	Action RPG		FromSoftware	Bandai Namco Entertainment		
2024	The Elder Scrolls Online: Gold Road	WIN, OSX, PS4, PS5, XBO, XBX/S	Expansion	MMORPG		ZeniMax Online Studios	Bethesda Softworks		
2024	Elrentaros Wanderings	WIN, NS		Action RPG		Hakama	Bushiroad		
2024	Elsie	WIN, NS, PS5		Roguelike		Knight Shift Games	Playtonic Friends		
2024 (JP)	Emberstoria	WIN, iOS, DROID		Tactical RPG		Square Enix			
2024	Enotria: The Last Song	WIN, PS5, XBX/S		Soulslike, Action RPG		Jyamma Games			
2024	Eternights	NS		Action RPG		Studio Sai			
2024	Fairy Tail 2	WIN, NS, PS4, PS5	Original			Gust	Koei Tecmo		
2024	Fantasian Neo Dimension	WIN, NS, PS4, PS5, XBX/S				Mistwalker	Square Enix		
2024	Farmagia	WIN, NS, PS5		Action RPG		Marvelous	Marvelous, Marvelous Europe, Marvelous USA		
2024	Fate Seeker II	PS5, XBO, XBX/S		Action RPG		JSL Entertainment	Niugamer		
2024 (WW)	Felvidek	WIN	Original	Turn-based, JRPG	Alternate History, Low Fantasy	Jozef Pavelka, Vlado Ganaj	Tutto Passa	CZ	
2024	Final Fantasy Pixel Remaster	XBX/S	Remaster, Compilation			Square Enix			
2024 (WW)	Final Fantasy VII Rebirth	WIN, PS5	Remake	Real-time, JRPG	Fantasy	Square Enix Creative Business Unit I	Square Enix	JP	
2024	Final Fantasy XIV	XBX/S	Port	MMORPG		Square Enix			
2024	Final Fantasy XIV: Dawntrail	WIN, OSX, PS4, PS5, XBX/S	Expansion	MMORPG		Square Enix			
2024	Final Fantasy XVI	WIN	Port	Action RPG		Square Enix			
2024	Flint: Treasure of Oblivion	WIN, PS5, XBX/S		Tactical RPG		Savage Level	Microids		
2024	Flintlock: The Siege of Dawn	WIN, PS4, PS5, XBO, XBX/S		Action RPG		A44	Kepler Interactive		
2024	For the King II	PS5, XBO, XBX/S		Roguelike, Tactical RPG		IronOak Games	Curve Games		
2024	Front Mission 2: Remake	WIN, PS4, PS5, XBO, XBX/S	Port	Tactical RPG		Storm Trident	Forever Entertainment		
2024	Genshin Impact	XBX/S	Port	Action RPG		MiHoYo			
2024	Goblin Slayer Another Adventurer: Nightmare Feast	WIN, NS		Tactical RPG		Apollosoft, Mebius	JP: Bushiroad Games; WW: Red Art Games		
2024 (JP)	goHELLgo: Tsukiotoshiteko	WIN, NS, PS4				Entergram			
2024	Golden Sun	NS	Port			Camelot Software Planning	Nintendo		
2024	Golden Sun: The Lost Age	NS	Port			Camelot Software Planning	Nintendo		
2024 (WW)	Granblue Fantasy: Relink	WIN, PS4, PS5	Original	Action RPG	Fantasy	Osaka Cygames	Cygames	JP	
2024	Grandia HD Collection	PS4, XBO	Remaster, Compilation			Game Arts, Sickhead Games	GungHo Online Entertainment		
2024 (WW)	GreedFall 2: The Dying World	WIN, XBX/S, PS5	Early access	Action RPG	Fantasy	Spiders	Nacon	FR	
2024	Guild Wars 2: Janthir Wilds	WIN	Expansion	MMORPG		ArenaNet	NCSoft		
2024	Halls of Torment	WIN, LIN	Full release	Roguelike		Chasing Carrots			
2024	Hammerwatch 2	PS4, XBX/S		Action RPG		Crackshell	Modus Games		
2024	Heaven Burns Red	WIN, iOS, DROID				Key, WFS	Yostar		
2024	Heaven Seeker: The Savior of This Cruel World	NS, PS4, PS5, iOS, DROID, WIN		Roguelike		Success			
2024	Horizon Forbidden West Complete Edition	WIN	Port	Action RPG		Guerrilla Games, Nixxes Software	Sony Interactive Entertainment		
2024	Horizon Zero Dawn Remastered	WIN, PS5	Remaster	Action RPG		Guerrilla Games	Sony Interactive Entertainment		
2024 (JP)	Hyperdimension Neptunia Re;Birth1	NS				Compile Heart			
2024 (JP)	Hyperdimension Neptunia Re;Birth2: Sisters Generation	NS, PS4				Compile Heart			
2024 (JP)	Hyperdimension Neptunia Re;Birth3: V Generation	NS, PS4				Compile Heart			
2024	Ikki Unite	NS		Roguelike		Sunsoft			
2024	Inkbound	WIN		Roguelike		Shiny Shoe			
2024	Insurmountable	NS, PS4, PS5, XBO, XBX/S		Roguelike		ByteRockers' Games	Daedalic Entertainment		
2024 (JP)	Kaeru no Tame ni Kane wa Naru	NS	Port	Action RPG		Intelligent Systems, Nintendo R&D1	Nintendo		
2024 (JP)	KAMiBAKO: Mythology of Cube	WIN, NS, PS4, PS5				Gravity Game Arise			
2024 (WW)	Keylocker: Turn Based Cyberpunk Action	WIN, NS, PS5, XBX/S	Original	Tactical RPG	Cyberpunk	Moonana	Serenity Forge	SE	
2024	King Arthur: Knight's Tale	PS5, XBX/S	Port	Tactical RPG		NeocoreGames			
2024	Kingdom Come: Deliverance	NS	Port	Action RPG		Warhorse Studios, Saber Interactive	Saber Interactive		
2024	Kingdom: The Blood	WIN, iOS, DROID		Action RPG		Action Square	Action Square, YJM Games		
2024	Last Epoch	WIN		Action RPG		Eleventh Hour Games			
2024 (JP)	The Legend of Heroes: Trails Beyond the Horizon	PS4, PS5				Nihon Falcom			
2024	The Legend of Heroes: Trails of Cold Steel III	PS5				Nihon Falcom	NIS America		
2024	The Legend of Heroes: Trails of Cold Steel IV	PS5				Nihon Falcom	NIS America		
2024	The Legend of Heroes: Trails Through Daybreak	WIN, NS, PS4, PS5				Nihon Falcom	JP: Nihon Falcom; WW: NIS America		
2024 (JP)	The Legend of Heroes: Trails Through Daybreak II	NS				Nihon Falcom			
2024	The Legend of Legacy HD Remastered	WIN, NS, PS4, PS5	Remaster			Cattle Call	WW: NIS America; JP: FuRyu		
2024	Legend of Mana	XBX/S	Port	Action RPG		Square Enix			
2024	Like a Dragon: Infinite Wealth	WIN, PS4, PS5, XBO, XBX/S	Original			Ryu Ga Gotoku Studio	Sega		
2024 (JP)	Mado Monogatari: Fia and the Wondrous Academy	NS, PS4, PS5		Action RPG		Sting Entertainment, D4 Enterprise	Compile Heart		
2024	Mario & Luigi: Brothership	NS	Original			Acquire	Nintendo		
2024	Mario Golf (Game Boy Color)	NS	Port			Camelot Software Planning	Nintendo		
2024	Mario Tennis (Game Boy Color)	NS	Port			Camelot Software Planning	Nintendo		
2024 (JP)	Marvelous: Mōhitotsu no Takarajima	NS	Port			Nintendo R&D2	Nintendo		
2024 (WW)	Metaphor: ReFantazio	WIN, XBX/S, PS5, PS4	Original	Turn-based, JRPG	Fantasy	Studio Zero	Sega, Atlus	JP	
2024	Monster Hunter Stories	WIN, NS, PS4	Port			Capcom, Marvelous	Capcom		
2024	Monster Hunter Stories 2: Wings of Ruin	PS4	Port			Capcom, Marvelous	Capcom		
2024 (JP)	Mother 3	NS	Port			1-Up Studio Inc., HAL Laboratory	Nintendo		
2024	Mullet MadJack	WIN		Roguelike		Hammer95			
2024	Mushoku Tensei: Jobless Reincarnation – Quest of Memories	WIN, NS, PS4, PS5	Original			Lancarse	Bushiroad Games		
2024	Neon Blood	WIN, NS, PS4, PS5, XBO, XBX/S				ChaoticBrain Studio	Meridiem Games		
2024	Neptunia Game Maker R:Evolution	NS, PS4, PS5, XBX/S		Action RPG		Compile Heart	Idea Factory International		
2024	Neptunia: Sisters VS Sisters	XBO, XBX/S, NS	Port	Action RPG		Compile Heart	Idea Factory International		
2024	The New Denpa Men	NS				Genius Sonority			
2024	New World: Aeternum	WIN, PS5, XBX/S		MMORPG		Amazon Games Orange County	Amazon Games		
2024	Octopath Traveler	PS4, PS5	Port			Square Enix, Acquire	Square Enix		
2024	Octopath Traveler II	XBO, XBX/S	Port			Square Enix, Acquire	Square Enix		
2024	One Piece Odyssey: Deluxe Edition	NS	Port			ILCA	Bandai Namco Entertainment		
2024 (JP)	Pand Land	iOS, DROID				Game Freak, WonderPlanet	WonderPlanet		
2024	Paper Mario: The Thousand-Year Door	NS	Remake			Intelligent Systems	Nintendo		
2024 (WW)	Path of Exile 2	WIN, PS5, XBX/S	Early access	Action RPG		Grinding Gear Games		NZ	
2024	Peglin	WIN, OSX, NS	Full release	Roguelike		Red Nexus Games	Red Nexus Games, BlitWorks Games		
2024	Penny Blood: Hellbound	WIN	Full release	Roguelike		Natsume Atari, Studio Wildrose	Natsume Atari		
2024	Pentiment	NS, PS4, PS5	Port			Obsidian Entertainment	Xbox Game Studios		
2024	Perish	PS4, PS5, XBO, XBX/S		Roguelike		Item42	HandyGames		
2024 (WW)	Persona 3 Reload	WIN, XBX/S, PS5, PS4, XBO	Remake	Turn-based, JRPG	Fantasy	P-Studio	Sega, Atlus	JP	
2024	Phantom Brave: The Hermuda Triangle Remastered	PS5	Remaster	Tactical RPG		Nippon Ichi Software	NIS America		
2024	Pokémon Mystery Dungeon: Red Rescue Team	NS	Port	Roguelike, Monster tamer		Chunsoft	JP: The Pokémon Company; WW: Nintendo		
2024	Rabbit and Steel	WIN		Roguelike		mino_dev			
2024	Ravenswatch	WIN, PS4, PS5, XBO, XBX/S	Full release	Roguelike		Passtech Games	Nacon		
2024 (JP)	Re:Zero − Starting Life in Another World: Witch's Re:surrection	iOS, DROID		Action RPG		Elemental Craft	Kadokawa Corporation		
2024	Reynatis	WIN, NS, PS4, PS5		Action RPG		FuRyu, Natsume Atari	JP: FuRyu; WW: NIS America		
2024 (JP)	Rhapsody: 25th Anniversary Collection	NS, PS5	Compilation			Nippon Ichi Software			
2024	Rise of the Rōnin	PS5	Original	Action RPG		Team Ninja	Sony Interactive Entertainment		
2024	Risk of Rain 2	PS5, XBX/S		Roguelike		Gearbox Software	Gearbox Publishing		
2024	Riviera: The Promised Land – Remaster	WW: WIN, NS; JP: iOS, DROID	Remaster			Sting Entertainment			
2024	ROBOBEAT	WIN		Roguelike		Inzanity	Kwalee		
2024	Rogue Waters	WIN		Roguelike, Tactical RPG		Ice Code Games	Tripwire Presents		
2024	Romancing SaGa 2: Revenge of the Seven	WIN, NS, PS4, PS5	Remake			Square Enix, xeen Inc.	Square Enix		
2024 (WW)	S.T.A.L.K.E.R. 2: Heart of Chornobyl	WIN, XBX/S	Original			GSC Game World		UA	
2024	SaGa: Emerald Beyond	WIN, NS, PS4, PS5, iOS, DROID				Square Enix			
2024	Sand Land	WIN, PS4, PS5, XBX/S		Action RPG		ILCA	Bandai Namco Entertainment		
2024	Save Me Mr Tako: Definitive Edition	PS4	Port	Action RPG		Deneos Games	Limited Run Games		
2024	Scars of Mars	WIN, NS				Acquire			
2024 (WW)	Secrets of Grindea					Pixel Ferrets		SE	
2024	Shin Megami Tensei V: Vengeance	WIN, NS, PS4, PS5, XBO, XBX/S	Rerelease			Atlus			
2024	Shiren the Wanderer: The Mystery Dungeon of Serpentcoil Island	WIN, NS		Roguelike		Spike Chunsoft			
2024	Shoulders of Giants: Ultimate	PS5		Roguelike		Moving Pieces Interactive			
2024	Skald: Against the Black Priory	WIN, OSX				High North Studios	Raw Fury Games		
2024	Sky Oceans: Wings for Hire	WIN, NS, PS5, XBX/S				Octeto Studios	PQube		
2024	Soul Covenant	WIN, PS5		Action RPG		Thirdverse			
2024	South Park: Snow Day!	WIN, NS, PS5, XBX/S		Action RPG		Question	THQ Nordic		
2024	Sovereign Syndicate	WIN				Crimson Herring Studios			
2024	Spiritfall	WIN, OSX	Full release	Roguelike		Gentle Giant			
2024	Starfield: Shattered Space	WIN, XBX/S	Expansion	Action RPG		Bethesda Game Studios	Bethesda Softworks		
2024	Starseed: Asnia Trigger	iOS, DROID		Action RPG		JoyCity	Com2uS		
2024 (JP)	Stray Children	NS				Onion Games			
2024	SunnySide	WIN, PS5, XBX/S				RainyGames	Merge Games		
2024	Teenage Mutant Ninja Turtles: Splintered Fate	NS, WIN	Port	Roguelike		Super Evil Megacorp			
2024	Tenderfoot Tactics	NS, XBO, XBX/S		Tactical RPG		Badru, Isa Hutchinson, Taylor Thomas, Zoe Vartanian	Ice Water Games		
2024 (JP)	Tenshi no Uta Collection	NS				Edia			
2024 (WW)	Terra Memoria	WIN, NS, PS5, XBX/S	Original	Turn-based	Fantasy	La Moutarde	Dear Villagers	FR	
2024	That Time I Got Reincarnated as a Slime Isekai Chronicles	WIN, NS, PS4, PS5, XBO, XBX/S		Action RPG		ZOC, Monkeycraft	Bandai Namco Entertainment		
2024 (WW)	The Thaumaturge	WIN, XBX/S, PS5	Original	Turn-based	Historical	Fool's Theory	11 Bit Studios	PL	
2024	Throne and Liberty	WIN, PS5, XBX/S		MMORPG		NCSoft	Amazon Games		
2024	Tokyo Clanpool	WW: WIN; AS: NS				Compile Heart	eastasiasoft		
2024 (JP)	Tokyo Revengers: Last Mission	WIN, iOS, DROID		Action RPG		Victor Entertainment			
2024	Tokyo Xanadu eX+	NS		Action RPG		Nihon Falcom	Aksys Games		
2024	Touhou Genso Wanderer: FORESIGHT	NS, PS4		Dungeon crawl		Aqua Style, ankaa studio	Phoenixx		
2024	Touhou Shoujo: Tale of Beautiful Memories	PS4		Action RPG		The N Main Shop	Mediascape		
2024	Touhou Spell Carnival	NS, PS4, PS5		Tactical RPG		Sting Entertainment	WW: Idea Factory International; JP: Compile Heart		
2024	Trials of Mana	XBX/S	Port	Action RPG		Square Enix			
2024	Unicorn Overlord	NS, PS4, PS5, XBX/S	Original	Tactical RPG		Vanillaware	Atlus		
2024	Vampire Survivors	PS4, PS5	Port	Roguelike		poncle			
2024	VED	WIN, NS, PS4, PS5, XBO, XBX/S				Karaclan	Fulqrum Publishing		
2024	Visions of Mana	WIN, PS4, PS5, XBX/S	Original	Action RPG		Ouka Studios	Square Enix		
2024	Wayfinder	WIN, PS5	Full release	Action RPG		Airship Syndicate			
2024 (CN)	Where Winds Meet	WIN		Action RPG		Everstone Studio			
2024	Whisker Waters	WIN, NS, PS5				Underbite Games	Merge Games		
2024	Wild West Dynasty	WIN	Full release			Moon Punch Studio	Toplitz Productions		
2024	Wildermyth	NS, PS4, PS5, XBO, XBX/S		Tactical RPG		Worldwalker Games	Auroch Digital		
2024	WitchSpring R	NS, PS5				Kiwi Walks			
2024	Wizardry Variants Daphne	iOS, DROID				Studio 2PRO	Drecom		
2024	Wizardry: Proving Grounds of the Mad Overlord	WIN, NS, PS4, PS5, XBO, XBX/S	Full release	Dungeon crawl		Digital Eclipse			
2024 (JP)	WiZmans World Re:Try	NS, PS4, PS5				Lancarse, City Connection	City Connection		
2024	World of Warcraft: Cataclysm Classic	WIN, OSX	Rerelease	MMORPG		Blizzard Entertainment			
2024	World of Warcraft: The War Within	WIN, OSX	Expansion	MMORPG		Blizzard Entertainment			
2024	Wuthering Waves	WIN, iOS, DROID	Original	Action RPG		Kuro Games			
2024	Xuan-Yuan Sword VII	NS		Action RPG		Softstar, DOMO Studio	eastasiasoft		
2024	Xuan-Yuan Sword: The Gate of Firmament	PS5		Action RPG		Softstar, DOMO Studio	eastasiasoft		
2024	Ys Memoire: The Oath in Felghana	PS4, PS5		Action RPG		Nihon Falcom			
2024	Ys X: Nordics	WIN, NS, PS4, PS5		Action RPG		Nihon Falcom	NIS America		
2024	Yuuna and the Haunted Hot Springs: The Thrilling Steamy Maze Kiwami	WIN, iOS, DROID, NS, PS5				Matrix Software	FuRyu		
2024	Zenless Zone Zero	WIN, iOS, DROID, PS5	Original	Action RPG		miHoYo	CHN: miHoYo; WW: Cognosphere		
2025	A Wild Last Boss Appeared! Black-Winged Survivor	WIN, NS, PS4, PS5		Roguelike		Rocket Studio	Sunsoft		
2025	Achilles: Legends Untold	NS		Action RPG		Dark Point Games			
2025	Achilles: Survivor	WIN, PS4, PS5, XBO, XBX/S	Full release	Roguelike		Dark Point Games			
2025	AI Limit	WIN, PS5		Action RPG		SenseGames	CE-Asia		
2025	All in Abyss: Judge the Fake	WIN, NS, PS5				Acquire, WSS Playground	Alliance Arts		
2025	Alterna Vvelt: Blue Exorcist Another Story	iOS, DROID	Original	Action RPG		Aniplex			
2025	Altheia: The Wrath of Aferi	WIN				MarsLit Games	Neon Doctrine		
2025	Anima: Gate of Memories I & II Remaster	WIN, PS5, XBX/S	Remaster, Compilation	Action RPG		Anima Project			
2025	Anomaly Collapse	NS		Roguelike		RocketPunch Games	Spiral Up Games		
2025 (JP)	Artdink Game Log: Tail of the Sun	WIN, NS		Action RPG		Artdink			
2025	Atelier Resleriana: The Red Alchemist & the White Guardian	WIN, NS, PS4, PS5				Gust	Koei Tecmo		
2025	Atelier Ryza Secret Trilogy Deluxe Pack	WIN, NS, NS2, PS4, PS5				Gust	Koei Tecmo		
2025	Atelier Yumia: The Alchemist of Memories & the Envisioned Land	WIN, NS, PS4, PS5, XBO, XBX/S		Action RPG		Gust	Koei Tecmo		
2025 (WW)	Avowed	WIN, XBX/S	Original	Action RPG	Fantasy	Obsidian Entertainment	Xbox Game Studios	US	
2025	Ball x Pit	WIN, OSX, NS, PS5, XBX/S, NS2	Original	Roguelike		Kenny Sun	Devolver Digital		
2025	Battle Suit Aces	WIN, OSX, NS, PS5				Trinket Studios	Trinket Studios, Outersloth		
2025	Biomorph	XBX/S	Port	Soulslike		Lucid Dreams Studio			
2025	Bittersweet Birthday	WIN, OSX, LIN		Action RPG		World Eater Games	Dangen Entertainment		
2025	Black Myth: Wukong	XBX/S	Port	Action RPG		Game Science			
2025 (WW)	Blade & Soul Heroes	WIN, iOS, DROID		MMORPG		NCSoft			
2025	BlazBlue: Entropy Effect	iOS, DROID		Roguelike		91Act			
2025	Bloodshed	WIN, NS, PS4, PS5, XBO, XBX/S	Full release	Roguelike		com8com1 Software	Headup Games		
2025	Blue Protocol: Star Resonance	WIN, iOS, DROID	Original	MMORPG		Bokura	A Plus Japan		
2025	Bravely Default: Flying Fairy HD Remaster	NS2	Remaster			Cattle Call	Square Enix		
2025 (JP)	Calamity Angels: Special Delivery	NS, PS4, PS5				Compile Heart			
2025	Citizen Sleeper 2: Starward Vector	WIN, OSX, NS, PS5, XBX/S				Jump Over the Age	Fellow Traveller		
2025 (JP)	Cladun X3	NS, PS4, PS5		Action RPG		Nippon Ichi Software			
2025 (WW)	Cladun X3	WIN, NS, PS4, PS5		Action RPG		Nippon Ichi Software	NIS America		
2025 (WW)	Clair Obscur: Expedition 33	WIN, PS5, XBX/S	Original	Turn-based	Fantasy	Sandfall Interactive	Kepler Interactive	FR	
2025	Class of Heroes 3 Remaster	WIN, NS, PS5	Remaster	Dungeon crawl		Acquire	JP: Acquire; WW: PQube		
2025	CloverPit	WIN	Original	Roguelike		Panik Arcade	Future Friends Games		
2025	Coridden	WIN	Original	Action RPG		Aftnareld	Anshar Publishing		
2025	Crashlands 2	WIN, iOS, DROID		Action RPG		Butterscotch Shenanigans			
2025	Crescent Tower	WIN		Dungeon crawl		Curry Croquette	AMATA Games		
2025	Cryptical Path	WIN	Original	Roguelike		Old Skull Games			
2025 (JP)	Crystar	PS5		Action RPG		Gemdrops	FuRyu		
2025	Cthulhu Mythos ADV Lunatic Whispers & The Isle Of Ubohoth	NS, PS4, PS5				Gotcha Gotcha Games			
2025	Cuisineer	NS, PS5, XBX/S	Port	Roguelike		BattleBrew Productions	NA: Xseed Games; EU: Marvelous Europe		
2025	The Curse of Mount Madre	WIN				Kevin Musto			
2025	Cyberpunk 2077	OSX	Port	Action RPG		CD Projekt Red	CD Projekt		
2025	Cyberpunk 2077: Ultimate Edition	NS2	Port	Action RPG		CD Projekt Red	CD Projekt		
2025	Dark Deity II	WIN, NS		Tactical RPG		Sword & Axe	indie.io		
2025	Death By Scrolling	WIN, OSX, LIN		Roguelike		Terrible Toybox	MicroProse		
2025	Death end re;Quest: Code Z	WIN, PS4, PS5		Roguelike		Compile Heart	Idea Factory International		
2025	Death Howl	WIN		Soulslike		The Outer Zone	11 Bit Studios		
2025	Decision: Red Daze	PS5, XBX/S		Action RPG		FlyAnvil	Nordcurrent		
2025	Deltarune: Chapters 1+2+3+4	NS2, PS5	Port			Toby Fox, 8-4	8-4		
2025	Deltarune: Chapters 3+4	WIN, OSX, NS, PS4	Episode			Toby Fox, 8-4 (consoles)			
2025	Demeo x Dungeons & Dragons: Battlemarked	WIN, PS5				Resolution Games			
2025	Demonschool	WIN, OSX, LIN, NS, PS4, PS5, XBO, XBX/S		Tactical RPG		Necrosoft Games	Ysbyrd Games		
2025	Destiny: Rising	iOS, DROID	Original	Action RPG		NetEase Games			
2025	Digimon Story: Time Stranger	WIN, PS5, XBX/S				Media.Vision	Bandai Namco Entertainment		
2025	Discounty	WIN, NS, PS5, XBX/S				Crinkle Cut Games	PQube		
2025 (WW)	Disgaea 7 Complete	NS2		Tactical RPG		Nippon Ichi Software	NIS America		
2025	Divinity: Original Sin II – Definitive Edition	NS2, PS5, XBX/S	Port			Larian Studios			
2025 (WW)	Dokapon! Sword of Fury	WIN				Sting Entertainment			
2025	Dragon is Dead	WIN	Full release	Roguelike		Team Suneat	PM Studios		
2025	Dragon Quest I & II HD-2D Remake	WIN, NS, NS2, PS5, XBX/S	Remake, Compilation			Artdink, Square Enix	Square Enix		
2025 (JP)	Dragon Quest X Offline	iOS, DROID	Remake			B.B. Studio	Square Enix		
2025	Dreamed Away	WIN, OSX, LIN, NS, XBO, XBX/S				Nicolas Petton	Pineapple Works		
2025	Duet Night Abyss	WIN, iOS, DROID		Action RPG		Pan Studio	Hero Games		
2025	Dune: Awakening	WIN	Original	MMORPG		Funcom			
2025	Dungeons of Hinterberg	PS4, PS5		Action RPG		Microbird	Curve Games		
2025	Edens Zero	WIN, PS5, XBX/S		Action RPG		Konami Digital Entertainment			
2025	Elden Ring Nightreign	WIN, PS4, PS5, XBO, XBX/S	Original	Action RPG		FromSoftware	Bandai Namco Entertainment		
2025	The Elder Scrolls V: Skyrim Anniversary Edition	NS2	Port	Action RPG		Bethesda Game Studios	Bethesda Softworks		
2025	Empyreal	WIN, PS5, XBX/S		Action RPG		Silent Games	Secret Mode		
2025	Etheria: Restart	WIN, iOS, DROID				XD Games			
2025	Everhood 2	WIN, NS	Original			Chris Nordgren, Jordi Roca	Foreign Gnomes		
2025	Fallout 4: Anniversary Edition	WIN, PS5, XBX/S	Rerelease	Action RPG		Bethesda Game Studios	Bethesda Softworks		
2025	Fantasy Life i: The Girl Who Steals Time	WIN, NS, PS4, PS5, XBX/S, NS2				Level-5 Osaka Office	Level-5		
2025 (WW)	Fantasy Maiden Wars: Dream of the Stray Dreamer	WIN		Tactical RPG		Sanbondo	Phoenixx		
2025 (JP)	Farland Saga I & II Saturn Tribute	WIN, NS, PS4, PS5, XBO		Tactical RPG		City Connection			
2025	Fate: Reawakened	WIN, NS, PS4, PS5, XBO, XBX/S	Remaster, Compilation	Action RPG		gamigo, Tableflip Entertainment	gamigo, WildTangent		
2025	Final Fantasy Tactics: The Ivalice Chronicles	WIN, NS, NS2, PS4, PS5, XBX/S	Remaster	Tactical RPG		Square Enix			
2025	Final Fantasy VII Rebirth	WIN	Port	Action RPG		Square Enix			
2025 (CN)	Final Fantasy XIV Mobile	iOS, DROID	Original	MMORPG		LightSpeed Studios	Square Enix		
2025	Final Fantasy XVI	XBX/S	Port	Action RPG		Square Enix			
2025	Fire Emblem: The Sacred Stones	NS	Port	Tactical RPG		Intelligent Systems	Nintendo		
2025	The First Berserker: Khazan	WIN, PS5, XBX/S		Action RPG		Neople	Nexon		
2025	Flame Keeper	PS5		Roguelike		Kautki Cave	Untold Tales		
2025	Freedom Wars Remastered	WIN, NS, PS4, PS5	Remaster	Action RPG		Dimps	Bandai Namco Entertainment		
2025	Front Mission 3 Remake	NS	Remake	Tactical RPG		MegaPixel Studio	Forever Entertainment		
2025	Fuga: Melodies of Steel 3	WIN, NS, PS4, PS5, XBO, XBX/S		Tactical RPG		CyberConnect2			
2025 (JP)	G-Mode Archives+: Shin Megami Tensei: 20XX	NS, WIN				Atlus	G-Mode		
2025	Game of Thrones: Kingsroad	WIN, iOS, DROID	Full release			Netmarble	Warner Bros. Games		
2025	Grit & Valor: 1949	WIN, NS, PS5, XBX/S		Roguelike		Milky Tea	Megabit		
2025	Guild Wars 2: Visions of Eternity	WIN	Expansion	MMORPG		ArenaNet	NCSoft		
2025	Hades II	WIN, OSX, NS, NS2	Full release	Roguelike, Action RPG		Supergiant Games			
2025	Halls of Torment	PS5, XBX/S		Roguelike		Chasing Carrots			
2025	Hell Clock	WIN		Roguelike		Rogue Snail	Mad Mushroom		
2025	Heroes of Hammerwatch 2	WIN		Roguelike, Action RPG		Crackshell			
2025	Hogwarts Legacy	NS2	Port	Action RPG		Avalanche Software	Portkey Games		
2025	Hotel Barcelona	WIN, PS5, XBX/S		Roguelike		White Owls	Cult Games		
2025	The Hundred Line: Last Defense Academy	WIN, NS	Original	Tactical RPG		Too Kyo Games, Media.Vision	JP: Aniplex; WW: Xseed Games		
2025	HYKE: Northern Light(s)	WIN, NS, PS5		Action RPG		Blast Edge Games	Akatsuki Games, Aniplex		
2025 (JP)	Hyperdevotion Noire: Goddess Black Heart	NS		Tactical RPG		Compile Heart, Sting Entertainment	Compile Heart		
2025 (WW)	Hyperdimension Neptunia Re;Birth1 Plus	PS4				Compile Heart	Idea Factory International		
2025 (WW)	Hyperdimension Neptunia Re;Birth2: Sisters Generation	PS4				Compile Heart	Idea Factory International		
2025 (WW)	Hyperdimension Neptunia Re;Birth3: V Generation	PS4				Compile Heart	Idea Factory International		
2025	Inazuma Eleven: Victory Road	WIN, NS, NS2, PS4, PS5, XBX/S				Level-5			
2025	Is It Wrong to Try to Pick Up Girls in a Dungeon?: Fullland of Water and Light	WIN, NS		Action RPG		Bushiroad Games			
2025	Kaiju No. 8 The Game	WIN, iOS, DROID				Akatsuki Games			
2025	The King is Watching	WIN		Roguelike		Hypnohead	tinyBuild		
2025 (WW)	Kingdom Come: Deliverance II	WIN, PS5, XBX/S	Original	Action RPG	Historical	Warhorse Studios	Deep Silver	CZ	
2025	Kingdoms of the Dump	WIN, OSX, LIN	Original			Roach Games, Dream Sloth Games	Roach Games		
2025 (JP)	The Legend of Heroes: Trails into Reverie	PS5				Nihon Falcom			
2025 (JP)	The Legend of Heroes: Trails of Cold Steel III	PS5				Nihon Falcom			
2025 (JP)	The Legend of Heroes: Trails of Cold Steel IV	PS5				Nihon Falcom			
2025 (WW)	The Legend of Heroes: Trails Through Daybreak II	WIN, NS, PS4, PS5		Action RPG		Nihon Falcom	NIS America		
2025	Legendary Hoplite	NS, PS4, PS5, XBO, XBX/S		Action RPG		TripleBricksGames	Ravenage		
2025	Let It Die: Inferno	WIN, PS5	Original	Roguelike		Supertrick Games	GungHo Online Entertainment		
2025	Lethal Honor: Order of the Apocalypse	WIN, PS5, XBX/S		Roguelike		Viral Studios	HandyGames		
2025	The Lonesome Guild	WIN, PS5, XBX/S		Action RPG		Tiny Bull Studios	Don't Nod		
2025	Lost Eidolons: Veil of the Witch	WIN, NS, PS5, XBX/S	Full release	Tactical RPG		Ocean Drive Studio	Kakao Games		
2025	Lost in Random: The Eternal Die	WIN, NS, PS5, XBX/S		Roguelike		Stormteller Games	Thunderful Games		
2025	Lost Soul Aside	WIN, PS5	Original	Action RPG		Ultizero Games	Sony Interactive Entertainment		
2025	Lunar Remastered Collection	WIN, NS, PS4, XBO	Remaster, Compilation			Game Arts, GungHo Online Entertainment	GungHo Online Entertainment		
2025 (WW)	Mado Monogatari: Fia and the Wondrous Academy	NS, PS4, PS5		Dungeon crawl		Sting Entertainment, D4 Enterprise	Idea Factory International		
2025 (JP)	Magical Librarian Ariana: The Books of the Seven Heroes	NS, PS4, PS5		Action RPG		HYDE	Compile Heart		
2025 (JP)	Magical Vacation	NS, NS2				Brownie Brown	Nintendo		
2025	Maliki: Poison of the Past	WIN, NS				Blue Banshee	Ankama		
2025	Mandragora: Whispers of the Witch Tree	WIN, NS, PS5, XBX/S		Action RPG		Primal Game Studio	Knights Peak		
2025	Marisa of Liartop Mountain	WIN, NS				Unknown X	Alliance Arts		
2025	Marvel Mystic Mayhem	iOS, DROID	Original	Tactical RPG		NetEase Games			
2025 (JP)	Medabots Survivors	iOS, DROID		Roguelike		Imagineer			
2025	Mercenaries Lament: Requiem of the Silver Wolf	WIN		Tactical RPG		RideonJapan, Esquadra	Flyhigh Works		
2025	Metal Bringer	WIN, PS5		Roguelike		Alphawing	Playism		
2025	Million Depth	WIN, OSX		Roguelike		Cyber Space Biotope	Playism		
2025 (JP)	Monkarufanta: The Hero and the Crystal Girl	NS		Dungeon crawl		Experience			
2025	Monster Hunter Stories	XBO	Port			Capcom			
2025	Monster Hunter Stories 2: Wings of Ruin	XBO	Port			Capcom			
2025 (WW)	Monster Hunter Wilds	WIN, PS5, XBX/S	Original	Action RPG		Capcom		JP	
2025	Moros Protocol	WIN		Roguelike		Pixel Reign	Super Rare Originals		
2025	Morsels	WIN, OSX, NS, PS5, XBX/S		Roguelike		Furcula	Annapurna Interactive		
2025	Mullet MadJack	XBO, XBX/S		Roguelike		Hammer95			
2025	Neptunia Game Maker R:Evolution	WIN		Action RPG		Compile Heart	Idea Factory International		
2025	Neverwinter Nights 2: Enhanced Edition	WIN, NS, PS5, XBX/S	Remaster			Aspyr			
2025	Nicktoons & The Dice of Destiny	WIN, NS, PS5, XBX/S, NS2		Action RPG		Fair Play Labs, Petit Fabrik	GameMill Entertainment		
2025	Oaths of Light – Chapter I	WIN				ASM-Games			
2025	Oceanhorn: Chronos Dungeon	iOS, DROID, WIN		Dungeon crawl		Cornfox & Bros.	FDG Entertainment		
2025	Octopath Traveler 0	WIN, NS, NS2, PS4, PS5, XBX/S	Original			Square Enix, Dokidoki Grooveworks	Square Enix		
2025	Of Ash and Steel	WIN		Action RPG		Fire & Frost	tinyBuild		
2025	Off	WIN, NS	Remake			Mortis Ghost	Fangamer		
2025	The Outer Worlds 2	WIN, PS5, XBX/S	Original	Action RPG		Obsidian Entertainment	Xbox Game Studios		
2025	Peglin	PS4, PS5, XBO, XBX/S		Roguelike		Red Nexus Games	BlitWorks Games		
2025	Persona 3 Reload	NS2	Port			P-Studio	Atlus		
2025 (WW)	Persona 5: The Phantom X	WIN, iOS, DROID	Original			Black Wings Game Studio	Atlus, Sega		
2025	Phantom Brave: The Lost Hero	NS, PS4, PS5, WIN		Tactical RPG		Nippon Ichi Software	JP: Nippon Ichi Software; WW: NIS America		
2025	Pokémon Legends: Z-A	NS, NS2	Original	Action RPG, Monster tamer		Game Freak	JP: The Pokémon Company; WW: Nintendo		
2025 (JP)	Progress Orders	WIN, NS				Hakama	Bushiroad Games		
2025	Puella Magi Madoka Magica: Magia Exedra	iOS, DROID, WIN				Pokelabo, f4samurai	Aniplex		
2025 (JP)	The Quintessential Princesses: Fantasy, the Abyss, and the Magic Academy	NS, PS4, PS5				Mages			
2025	Raidou Remastered: The Mystery of the Soulless Army	WIN, NS, NS2, PS4, PS5, XBO, XBX/S	Remaster	Action RPG		Atlus			
2025	Ravenswatch	NS	Port	Roguelike		Passtech Games	Nacon		
2025	Redemption of Liuyin	WIN, PS5, XBX/S		Soulslike		KingnaGame			
2025	Reverie in the Moonlight	WIN		Roguelike		room6			
2025	Rise Eterna II	WIN, NS, PS4, PS5, XBO, XBX/S		Tactical RPG		Makee Games, Ricci Cedric Design	Forever Entertainment		
2025	Rise of the Rōnin	WIN	Port	Action RPG		Team Ninja	Koei Tecmo		
2025	Roboquest	PS4, PS5		Roguelike		RyseUp Studios	Starbreeze Studios		
2025	Robots at Midnight	WIN, XBX/S, PS5		Action RPG		Finish Line Games	Snail		
2025	The Rogue Prince of Persia	WIN, PS5, XBX/S, NS, NS2	Full release	Roguelike		Evil Empire	Ubisoft		
2025	Rogue Waters	NS, PS5, XBX/S		Roguelike, Tactical RPG		Ice Code Games	Tripwire Presents		
2025	Romancing SaGa: Minstrel Song Remastered International	NS, PS4, PS5				Square Enix, Bullets	Square Enix, Red Art Games		
2025	Rue Valley	WIN, NS, PS5, XBX/S				Emotion Spark Studio	Owlcat Games		
2025	Rune Factory: Guardians of Azuma	WIN, NS, NS2	Original	Action RPG		Marvelous			
2025	Sacred 2: Fallen Angel Remaster	WIN, PS5, XBX/S	Remaster	Action RPG		SparklingBit	THQ Nordic		
2025	SaGa Frontier 2 Remastered	WIN, NS, PS4, PS5, iOS, DROID	Remaster			Square Enix, Bullets	Square Enix		
2025	Scar-Lead Salvation	WIN, PS4, PS5, XBX/S		Roguelike		Compile Heart, Neilo	JP: Compile Heart; WW: Idea Factory International		
2025	SD Gundam G Generation Eternal	iOS, DROID		Tactical RPG		Bandai Namco Entertainment			
2025	Sea Fantasy	WIN, NS	Original	Action RPG		METASLA			
2025	Second Sun	WIN				Grey Wolf Entertainment	Iceberg Interactive		
2025	Shape of Dreams	WIN		Roguelike		Lizard Smoothie	Neowiz		
2025	Shovel Knight Dig	PS5, XBO, XBX/S	Port	Roguelike		Nitrome, Yacht Club Games	Yacht Club Games		
2025	Slots & Daggers	WIN, OSX		Roguelike		Friedemann	Future Friends Games		
2025	Solo Leveling: Arise Overdrive	WIN		Action RPG		Netmarble Neo	Netmarble		
2025	Spiritfall	NS, PS4, PS5, XBO, XBX/S		Roguelike		Gentle Giant			
2025 (JP)	Starbites	NS, PS5, XBX/S				IKINAGAMES	Happinet		
2025	Stella Sora	WIN, DROID, iOS		Action RPG		Yostar			
2025	Storm Lancers	NS		Roguelike		ProbablyMonsters			
2025 (WW)	Stray Children	WIN, NS				Onion Games			
2025	Sugoro Quest: Dice Heroes	NS, PS4, PS5, XBO, XBX/S				Ratalaika Games	Shinyuden, Ratalaika Games		
2025	Suikoden I & II HD Remaster: Gate Rune and Dunan Unification Wars	WIN, NS, PS4, PS5, XBO, XBX/S, NS2	Remaster, Compilation	Tactical RPG		Konami Digital Entertainment			
2025	Super Robot Wars Y	WIN, NS, PS5		Tactical RPG		Bandai Namco Forge Digitals	Bandai Namco Entertainment		
2025	Survival Kids	NS	Port			Konami Computer Entertainment Sapporo	Konami		
2025	The Sword of Hope	NS	Port			Kemco	NA: Seika Corporation; JP/EU: Kemco		
2025	Sword of the Necromancer: Resurrection	WIN, NS, PS4, PS5, XBO, XBX/S	Remake	Action RPG		Grimorio of Games			
2025	Sworn	WIN, NS, PS5, XBX/S	Full release	Roguelike		Windwalk Games	Team17		
2025	System Shock 2: 25th Anniversary Remaster	WIN, NS, PS4, PS5, XBO, XBX/S	Remaster	Action RPG		Nightdive Studios			
2025	Tails of Iron II: Whiskers of Winter	WIN, OSX, LIN, NS, PS4, PS5, XBO, XBX/S		Action RPG		Odd Bug Studio	United Label		
2025	Tainted Grail: The Fall of Avalon	WIN, PS5, XBX/S	Full release	Action RPG		Questline	Awaken Realms		
2025	Tales of Graces f Remastered	WIN, NS, PS4, PS5, XBO, XBX/S	Remaster	Action RPG		Tose	Bandai Namco Entertainment		
2025	Tales of Xillia Remastered	WIN, NS, PS5, XBX/S	Remaster	Action RPG		Dokidoki Grooveworks	Bandai Namco Entertainment		
2025	Teenage Mutant Ninja Turtles: Splintered Fate	PS4, PS5, XBO, XBX/S, NS2	Port	Roguelike		Super Evil Megacorp			
2025 (JP)	Telenet RPG Collection (Note: Includes Dark Kingdom, Hiōden: Mamono-tachi tono Chikai, and The Journey Home: Quest for the Throne.)	NS	Compilation	—N/a		Telenet Japan, Edia	Edia		
2025 (JP)	Tenshi no Uta: Shiroki Tsubasa no Inori	NS	Port			Edia			
2025 (WW)	The Elder Scrolls IV: Oblivion Remastered	WIN, PS5, XBX/S	Remaster	Real-time	Fantasy	Virtuos, Bethesda Game Studios	Bethesda Softworks	US	
2025	Touhou Spell Carnival	WIN		Tactical RPG		Compile Heart, Sting Entertainment	Idea Factory International		
2025	Touhou: Scarlet Curiosity	NS		Action RPG		Ankake Spa	Phoenixx		
2025	Towa and the Guardians of the Sacred Tree	WIN, NS, PS5, XBX/S		Roguelike		Brownies	Bandai Namco Entertainment		
2025	Trails in the Sky 1st Chapter	WIN, NS, NS2, PS5	Remake			Nihon Falcom	JP: Nihon Falcom; NA: GungHo Online Entertainment		
2025	Triangle Strategy	PS5, XBX/S	Port	Tactical RPG		Square Enix, Artdink	Square Enix		
2025	Tribe Nine	WIN, OSX, iOS, DROID		Action RPG		Too Kyo Games	Akatsuki Games		
2025	Trinity Trigger	iOS, DROID		Action RPG		Three Rings	FuRyu		
2025	Unyielder	WIN, LIN		Roguelike		TrueWorld Studios	Shueisha Games		
2025	The Use of Life	WIN	Full release			Daraneko Games	Playism		
2025	Utawarerumono: Zan	WIN		Action RPG		Aquaplus	Shiravune, DMM Games		
2025	Vampire: The Masquerade – Bloodlines 2	WIN, PS5, XBX/S	Original	Action RPG		The Chinese Room	Paradox Interactive		
2025	Varlet	WIN, NS, PS5				Aquria	FuRyu		
2025	Wander Stars	WIN, NS		Roguelike		Paper Castle	Fellow Traveller		
2025	Warhammer 40,000: Rogue Trader	NS2	Port			Owlcat Games			
2025	Warriors: Abyss	WIN, NS, PS4, PS5, XBO, XBX/S		Roguelike		Omega Force	Koei Tecmo		
2025 (WW)	Where Winds Meet	WIN, PS5	Original			Everstone Studio	NetEase Games		
2025	Whisker Squadron: Survivor	WIN, PS5	Full release	Roguelike		Flippfly			
2025	Wild Hearts S	NS2	Port	Action RPG		Omega Force	Koei Tecmo		
2025 (JP)	Wind Breaker: Rebel Heroes	WIN, iOS, DROID		Action RPG		Team Caravan	Kodansha		
2025	WitchSpring R	XBO				Kiwi Walks			
2025	Wizard of Legend II	WIN, PS5, XBX/S, NS	Full release	Roguelike		Dead Mage	Humble Games		
2025	Wizard101	PS4, PS5, XBO, XBX/S		MMORPG		KingsIsle Entertainment			
2025	Wizardry Variants Daphne	WIN		Dungeon crawl		Studio 2PRO	Drecom		
2025	Wizardry: The Five Ordeals	NS				59studio	Game*Spark Publishing		
2025	Wuchang: Fallen Feathers	WIN, PS5, XBX/S		Soulslike, Action RPG		Leenzee Games	505 Games		
2025	Wuthering Waves	PS5	Port	Action RPG		Kuro Games			
2025	Xenoblade Chronicles X: Definitive Edition	NS	Remaster	Action RPG		Monolith Soft	Nintendo		
2025	Yaoling: Mythical Journey	WIN	Full release			Rayka Studio	Rayka Studio, NPC Entertainment		
2025	Yasha: Legends of the Demon Blade	WIN, NS, PS4, PS5, XBX/S		Action RPG		7Quark	Game Source Entertainment		
2025	Yes, Your Grace: Snowfall	WIN				Brave at Night			
2025 (JP)	Yobarai Detective: Miasma Breaker	NS	Original	Action RPG		Mebius			
2025 (JP)	Ys IX: Monstrum Nox	PS5		Action RPG		Nihon Falcom			
2025 (JP)	Ys Memoire: Memories of Celceta	NS	Port	Action RPG		Nihon Falcom			
2025 (WW)	Ys Memoire: The Oath in Felghana	NS, PS4, PS5	Remaster	Action RPG		Nihon Falcom	NA: Xseed Games; EU: Marvelous Europe		
2025 (JP)	Ys VIII: Lacrimosa of Dana	PS5		Action RPG		Nihon Falcom			
2025 (JP)	Ys X: Proud Nordics	NS2		Action RPG		Nihon Falcom			
2025	Zenless Zone Zero	XBX/S	Port	Action RPG		miHoYo	CHN: miHoYo; WW: Cognosphere		
