= List of tactical role-playing video games: 2020 to 2029 =

This is a comprehensive index of commercial tactical role-playing games (Tactical RPGs), sorted chronologically by year. Information regarding release platform, release type, game setting, developers, publishers, and country of origin is provided where available. The table can be sorted by clicking on the small boxes next to the column headings.

== Legend ==
Video game platforms
DROID	Android	iOS	iOS, iPhone, iPod, iPadOS, iPad, visionOS, Apple Vision Pro	NS	Nintendo Switch
OSX	macOS	PS4	PlayStation 4	PS5	PlayStation 5
WIN	Microsoft Windows, all versions Windows 95 and up	XBO	Xbox One	XBX/S	Xbox Series X/S

Types of releases
Compilation	A compilation, anthology or collection of several titles, usually (but not always) belonging to the same series
Early access	A game launched in early access is unfinished and thus might contain bugs and glitches or have some of the content missing
Episodic	An episodic video game that is released in batches over a period of time
Expansion	A large-scale DLC to an already existing game that adds new story, areas and additions and/or changes to the game's mechanics
Full release	A full release of a game that launched in early access first
Limited	A special release (often called "Limited" or "Collector's Edition") with bonus collector's material. Often provided to people who pre-order a game
Port	The game first appeared on a different platform and a port was made. The game is like the original, with few or no differences
Remake	The game is an enhanced remake of an original, made using new engine and/or assets and thus containing completely new sound, graphics and possibly changes to the story and/or gameplay
Remaster	The game is a remaster of an original, released on the same or different platform, with minor changes to graphics, sound and/or gameplay
Rerelease	The game was re-released on the same platform with no or only minor changes

== List ==
Year	Title	Platform	Type	Setting	Developer	Publisher	COO	Ref.
2020 (WW)	Alder's Blood	NS, PS4, WIN, XBO	Original	Fantasy	Shockwork Games	No Gravity Games	PL	
2020	Arknights	iOS, DROID			Hypergryph, Studio Montagne	Hypergryph, Yostar		
2020 (WW)	Brigandine: The Legend of Runersia	PS4, NS, WIN			Matrix Software	Happinet		
2020 (WW)	Children of Zodiarcs	NS, XBO	Port	Fantasy	Cardboard Utopia	Plug-In Digital	CA	
2020 (WW)	The Dark Crystal: Age of Resistance Tactics	NS, OSX, PS4, WIN, XBO	Original	Fantasy	BonusXP	En Masse Entertainment	US	
2020 (WW)	Dread Nautical	NS, PS4, WIN, XBO	Original	Urban fantasy	Zen Studios	Zen Studios	HU	
2020 (WW)	Element Space	PS4, XBO	Port	Sci-fi	Sixth Vowel	Inca Games	AR	
2020	Fire Emblem: Mystery of the Emblem	NS						
2020	Fire Emblem: Shadow Dragon and the Blade of Light	NS				Nintendo		
2020 (WW)	Gears Tactics	WIN, XBO	Original	Sci-fi	Splash Damage, The Coalition	Xbox Game Studios	UK	
2020 (WW)	Grand Guilds	NS, PS4, WIN, XBO	Original	Fantasy	Drix Studio	Keybol Games	PH	
2020	Ikenfell	WIN, NS, PS4, XBO				Humble Bundle		
2020	Langrisser I & II	WIN, NS, PS4				NIS America		
2020 (WW)	Othercide	NS, PS4, WIN, XBO	Original	Horror	Lightbulb Crew	Focus Entertainment	FR	
2020 (WW)	ReversiQuest2	WIN	Port	Fantasy	Yokogosystems		JP	
2020	Tenderfoot Tactics	WIN, OSX, LIN				Ice Water Games		
2020	Transformers: Battlegrounds	WIN, NS, PS4, XBO				Outright Games		
2020 (WW)	Warhammer Quest: Silver Tower	iOS, DROID, WIN	Original	Fantasy	Perchang Games		UK	
2020 (WW)	Wintermoor Tactics Club	NS, PS4, WIN, XBO	Original	Fantasy	EVC	Versus Evil	US	
2020	XCOM 2 Collection	NS				2K Games		
2020 (WW)	XCOM: Chimera Squad	WIN	Original	Sci-fi	Firaxis Games	2K Games	US	
2021	Arkham Horror: Mother's Embrace	WIN, NS, PS4, XBO			Artefacts Studio	Asmodee Digital		
2021 (WW)	Blue Archive	iOS, DROID			Nexon Games	JP: Yostar; WW: Nexon Games		
2021	Dark Deity	WIN			Sword & Axe LLC	Freedom Games		
2021 (WW)	Disgaea 6: Defiance of Destiny	NS, PS4	Original	Fantasy	Nippon Ichi Software		JP	
2021 (JP)	Fire Emblem: Genealogy of the Holy War	NS						
2021	Fuga: Melodies of Steel	WIN, NS, PS4, PS5, XBO, XBX/S			CyberConnect2			
2021 (JP)	Gloria Union: Twin Fates in Blue Ocean FHD Edition	NS, iOS, DROID			Sting Entertainment	Atlus		
2021	King's Bounty II	WIN, NS, PS4, XBO			1C Company	Deep Silver		
2021	Re:Zero − Starting Life in Another World: The Prophecy of the Throne	WIN, NS, PS4			Chime	Spike Chunsoft		
2021	Ruined King: A League of Legends Story	WIN, NS, PS4, PS5, XBO, XBX/S			Airship Syndicate	Riot Forge		
2021	Shining Force	NS						
2021 (WW)	Solasta: Crown of the Magister	OSX, XBO, XBX/S, WIN	Original	Fantasy	Tactical Adventures		FR	
2021 (WW)	Super Robot Wars 30	PS4, NS, WIN	Original	Sci-fi (mecha)	B.B. Studio	Bandai Namco		
2021	Wildermyth	WIN			Worldwalker Games			
2022	Adventure Academia: The Fractured Continent	NS, PS4, WIN			Acquire	JP: Acquire; WW: PQube		
2022	Blackguards 2	NS			Daedalic Entertainment			
2022 (JP)	Cadavers for Dinner	NS, PS4			Nippon Ichi Software			
2022	Circus Electrique	WIN, NS, PS4, PS5, XBO, XBX/S			Zen Studios	Saber Interactive		
2022	Dark Deity	NS			Sword & Axe LLC	Freedom Games		
2022 (WW)	Digimon Survive	WIN, NS, PS4, XBO			Hyde	Bandai Namco Entertainment		
2022	The Diofield Chronicle	WIN, NS, PS4, PS5, XBO, XBX/S			Square Enix, Lancarse	Square Enix		
2022	Disgaea 4: A Promise Revisited	iOS, DROID			Nippon Ichi Software			
2022 (WW)	Disgaea 6 Complete	WIN, PS4, PS5			Nippon Ichi Software			
2022 (WW)	Expeditions: Rome	WIN	Original	Historical	Logic Artists	THQ Nordic	DK	
2022 (JP)	Fairy Fencer F: Refrain Chord	NS, PS4, PS5			Sting	Compile Heart		
2022	Front Mission 1st: Remake	NS			MegaPixel Studio	Forever Entertainment		
2022 (JP)	Fullmetal Alchemist Mobile	iOS, DROID			Square Enix			
2022 (WW)	Horizon Forbidden West	WIN, PS4	Original	Post-apocalyptic, Sci-fi	Guerrilla Games	Sony Interactive Entertainment	NL	
2022 (WW)	King Arthur: Knight's Tale	WIN	Original	Dark fantasy	NeocoreGames		HU	
2022	Lost Eidolons	WIN	Original		Ocean Drive Studio		KR	
2022 (WW)	Mario + Rabbids Sparks of Hope	NS	Original	Crossover	Ubisoft Milan, Ubisoft Paris	Ubisoft	FR	
2022 (WW)	Marvel's Midnight Suns	NS, PS4, PS5, WIN, XBO, XBX/S	Original	Fantasy	Firaxis Games	2K	US	
2022 (JP)	Monster Menu: The Scavenger's Cookbook	NS, PS4			Nippon Ichi Software			
2022 (EU/NA)	Prinny Presents NIS Classics Volume 2	WIN, NS			Nippon Ichi Software			
2022 (EU/NA)	Prinny Presents NIS Classics Volume 3	WIN, NS			Nippon Ichi Software			
2022	Relayer	PS4, PS5			Kadokawa Games	JP: Kadokawa Games; WW: Clouded Leopard Entertainment		
2022	Relayer Advanced	WIN			Kadokawa Games	Dragami Games		
2022	Reverie Knights Tactics	WIN, OSX, LIN, PS4, XBO			40 Giants Entertainment	1C Entertainment		
2022	Shadowrun Trilogy	NS, PS4, PS5, XBO, XBX/S			Harebrained Schemes	Paradox Interactive		
2022	Shining Force II	NS						
2022 (WW)	Symphony of War: The Nephilim Saga	WIN	Original	Fantasy	Dancing Dragon Games	indie.io	US	
2022 (WW)	Tactics Ogre: Reborn	WIN, NS, PS4, PS5	Remake	Fantasy	Square Enix		JP	
2022 (WW)	Triangle Strategy	NS, WIN	Original	Fantasy	Artdink, Netchubiyori	JP: Square Enix; WW: Nintendo	JP	
2022	Vanaris Tactics	WIN			Matheus Reis	Toge Productions		
2022	Vestaria Saga II: The Sacred Sword of Silvanister	WIN			Vestaria Project	Dangen Entertainment		
2023	Arcadian Atlas	WIN			Twin Otter Studios	Serenity Forge		
2023	Banchou Tactics	WIN			Secret Character, Itsaraamata	Flyhigh Works		
2023 (WW)	Disgaea 7: Vows of the Virtueless	WIN, NS, PS4, PS5		Fantasy	Nippon Ichi Software	OC: NIS America; WW: Nippon Ichi Software	JP	
2023	The Dragoness: Command of the Flame	NS, PS4, PS5, XBX/S			Crazy Goat Games	PQube		
2023	Fairy Fencer F: Refrain Chord	WIN, NS, PS4, PS5			Sting Entertainment, Compile Heart	Idea Factory		
2023 (WW)	Fire Emblem Engage	NS	Original	Fantasy	Intelligent Systems	Nintendo	JP	
2023 (JP)	Fire Emblem: The Binding Blade	NS						
2023	Fire Emblem: The Blazing Blade	NS						
2023	Front Mission 1st: Remake	WIN, PS4, PS5, XBO, XBX/S			MegaPixel Studio	Forever Entertainment		
2023	Front Mission 2: Remake	NS			Storm Trident	Forever Entertainment		
2023	Fuga: Melodies of Steel 2	WIN, NS, PS4, PS5, XBO, XBX/S			CyberConnect2			
2023	Gloomhaven	NS, PS4, PS5, XBO, XBX/S			Flaming Fowl Studios, Saber Interactive	Twin Sails Interactive		
2023	Great Ambition of the SLIMES	NS, WIN			Altair Works	Flyhigh Works		
2023 (WW)	The Iron Oath	WIN, OSX, LIN	Original	Dark fantasy	Curious Panda Games	Humble Games	US	
2023 (WW)	Jagged Alliance 3	WIN, PS4, PS5, XBO, XBX/S	Original	Modern	Haemimont Games	THQ Nordic	BG	
2023	Lost Eidolons	PS5, XBX/S			Ocean Drive Studio			
2023 (WW)	Mercenaries Lament: The Seven Stars of the Silver Wolf and Shrine Maiden	NS, PS4, PS5			RideonJapan, Esquadra	JP: RideonJapan; WW: Circle Entertainment, Flyhigh Works		
2023	Miasma Chronicles	WIN, PS5, XBX/S			The Bearded Ladies	505 Games		
2023 (WW)	Persona 5 Tactica	WIN, NS, PS4, PS5, XBO, XBX/S	Original	Urban fantasy	P-Studio	JP: Atlus; WW: Sega	JP	
2023	Record of Agarest War	NS			Compile Heart	Aksys Games		
2023	SpellForce: Conquest of Eo	WIN			Owned by Gravity	THQ Nordic		
2023	Untamed Tactics	WIN			Grumpy Owl Games	Ravenage		
2023	Wartales	NS, WIN, XBO, XBX/S			Shiro Games/Unlimited			
2023	Yggdra Union: We'll Never Fight Alone	WIN, NS			Sting Entertainment			
2024	C.A.R.D.S. RPG: The Misty Battlefield	WIN, NS, PS4, PS5			Acquire			
2024 (JP)	Disgaea 7 Complete	NS, PS4, PS5	Rerelease		Nippon Ichi Software			
2024 (JP)	Emberstoria	WIN, iOS, DROID			Square Enix			
2024 (JP)	Farland Saga I & II Saturn Tribute	WIN, NS, PS4, PS5, XBO			City Connection			
2024	Flint: Treasure of Oblivion	WIN, PS5, XBX/S			Savage Level	Microids		
2024	For the King II	PS5, XBO, XBX/S			IronOak Games	Curve Games		
2024	Front Mission 2: Remake	WIN, PS4, PS5, XBO, XBX/S	Port		Storm Trident	Forever Entertainment		
2024	Goblin Slayer Another Adventurer: Nightmare Feast	WIN, NS			Apollosoft, Mebius	JP: Bushiroad Games; WW: Red Art Games		
2024 (WW)	Keylocker: Turn Based Cyberpunk Action	WIN, NS, PS5, XBX/S	Original	Cyberpunk	Moonana	Serenity Forge	SE	
2024	King Arthur: Knight's Tale	PS5, XBX/S	Port		NeocoreGames			
2024	Phantom Brave: The Hermuda Triangle Remastered	PS5	Remaster		Nippon Ichi Software	NIS America		
2024	Rogue Waters	WIN			Ice Code Games	Tripwire Presents		
2024	Tenderfoot Tactics	NS, XBO, XBX/S			Badru, Isa Hutchinson, Taylor Thomas, Zoe Vartanian	Ice Water Games		
2024	Touhou Spell Carnival	NS, PS4, PS5			Sting Entertainment	WW: Idea Factory International; JP: Compile Heart		
2024 (WW)	Unicorn Overlord	NS, PS4, PS5, XBX/S	Original	Fantasy	Vanillaware	JP: Atlus; WW: Sega	JP	
2024	Wildermyth	NS, PS4, PS5, XBO, XBX/S			Worldwalker Games	Auroch Digital		
2025	Dark Deity II	WIN, NS			Sword & Axe	indie.io		
2025	Demonschool	WIN, OSX, LIN, NS, PS4, PS5, XBO, XBX/S			Necrosoft Games	Ysbyrd Games		
2025 (WW)	Disgaea 7 Complete	NS2			Nippon Ichi Software	NIS America		
2025 (WW)	Fantasy Maiden Wars: Dream of the Stray Dreamer	WIN			Sanbondo	Phoenixx		
2025	Final Fantasy Tactics: The Ivalice Chronicles	WIN, NS, NS2, PS4, PS5, XBX/S	Remaster		Square Enix			
2025	Fire Emblem: The Sacred Stones	NS	Port		Intelligent Systems	Nintendo		
2025	Front Mission 3 Remake	NS	Remake		MegaPixel Studio	Forever Entertainment		
2025	Fuga: Melodies of Steel 3	WIN, NS, PS4, PS5, XBO, XBX/S			CyberConnect2			
2025 (WW)	The Hundred Line: Last Defense Academy	WIN, NS	Original	Sci-fi	Too Kyo Games, Media.Vision	JP: Aniplex; WW: Xseed Games	JP	
2025 (JP)	Hyperdevotion Noire: Goddess Black Heart	NS			Compile Heart, Sting Entertainment	Compile Heart		
2025	Lost Eidolons: Veil of the Witch	WIN, NS, PS5, XBX/S	Full release		Ocean Drive Studio	Kakao Games		
2025	Marvel Mystic Mayhem	iOS, DROID	Original		NetEase Games			
2025	Mercenaries Lament: Requiem of the Silver Wolf	WIN			RideonJapan, Esquadra	Flyhigh Works		
2025	Phantom Brave: The Lost Hero	NS, PS4, PS5, WIN			Nippon Ichi Software	JP: Nippon Ichi Software; WW: NIS America		
2025	Rise Eterna II	WIN, NS, PS4, PS5, XBO, XBX/S			Makee Games, Ricci Cedric Design	Forever Entertainment		
2025	Rogue Waters	NS, PS5, XBX/S			Ice Code Games	Tripwire Presents		
2025	SD Gundam G Generation Eternal	iOS, DROID			Bandai Namco Entertainment			
2025	Suikoden I & II HD Remaster: Gate Rune and Dunan Unification Wars	WIN, NS, PS4, PS5, XBO, XBX/S, NS2	Remaster, Compilation		Konami Digital Entertainment			
2025	Super Robot Wars Y	WIN, NS, PS5			Bandai Namco Forge Digitals	Bandai Namco Entertainment		
2025	Touhou Spell Carnival	WIN			Compile Heart, Sting Entertainment	Idea Factory International		
2025	Triangle Strategy	PS5, XBX/S	Port		Square Enix, Artdink	Square Enix		
2026 (WW)	Mewgenics	WIN	Original		Edmund McMillen, Tyler Glaiel		US	
