= Everhood =

2021 rhythm adventure video game

Everhood: An Ineffable Tale of the Inexpressible Divine Moments of Truth
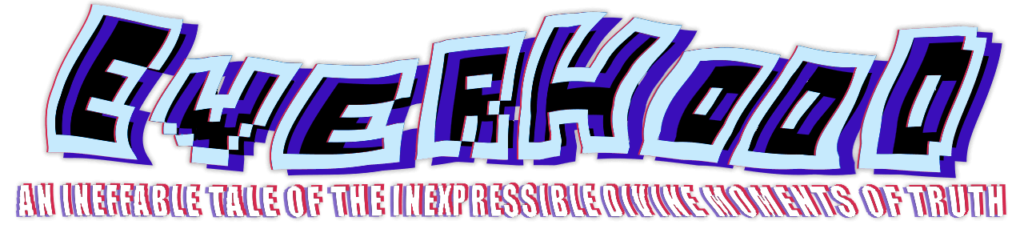
- Developer: Foreign Gnomes
- Publishers: Foreign Gnomes; Surefire.Games; BlitWorks
- Programmer: Jordi Roca
- Artist: Chris Nordgren
- Engine: Unity
- Platforms: Windows; Nintendo Switch; PlayStation 4 PlayStation 5 Xbox One; Xbox Series X/S
- Release: Windows, Switch; March 4, 2021; PS4, PS5, Xbox One, Series X/S; September 28, 2023
- Genres: Adventure, role-playing, rhythm
- Mode: Single-player

Everhood: An Ineffable Tale of the Inexpressible Divine Moments of Truth is a 2021 adventure RPG video game developed by Chris Nordgren and Jordi Roca, who go by the studio name Foreign Gnomes. Players control Red, a living wooden doll, exploring a minimalistic RPG world and fighting battles in a style similar to Guitar Hero in an effort to recover their stolen arm from Gold Pig, an immortal inhabitant of the land of Everhood. Along the way, the player allies with a small creature by the name of Blue Thief, and encounters a variety of characters who either attempt to aid or deter Red on their quest to retrieve their arm.

The game started development in 2018, and was released on Microsoft Windows and Nintendo Switch on March 4, 2021. Everhood: Eternity Edition, an expanded rerelease of the game, was released on September 28, 2023 for PlayStation 4, PlayStation 5, Xbox One and Xbox Series X/S. Everhood has been met with positive reception for its gameplay, presentation, and musical score, though its unclear plot, long loading times and occasional grammatical errors received criticism.

A sequel, titled Everhood 2, released on Windows and Nintendo Switch on March 4, 2025 to "generally favorable" reception, though it has not been as well received as the original.

== Plot ==
=== Setting ===
Everhood's world is composed of multiple separate areas, such as a carnival, a mushroom forest, and a desert. Many of these areas are not directly connected, but can be accessed from the central Cosmic Hub, an empty space with paths connecting various doors. These areas are inhabited by a diverse cast of characters, many named after colors; such as the player character itself, Red, as well as Blue Thief, Professor Orange, and the Green, Purple, and Brown Mages, among others.

It is gradually revealed that Everhood is the tattered remains of an ancient realm of immortals. Its remaining inhabitants mostly do not enjoy existence, being driven to insanity by countless years of boredom, but fear oblivion too much to accept death. The player must choose between killing them or leaving them to their immortal existence.

=== Story ===
At the beginning of the game, a disembodied voice directly addresses the player, asking them to "abandon their humanity and accept immortality" to enter the land of Everhood. After accepting, the player is given control over Red, a mute wooden doll who awakens after their arm is stolen by Blue Thief. Following Blue Thief’s path, they meet Frog, who engages in a battle serving as the game's tutorial.

Red continues forward into a nightclub. Guards and patrons bar Red's way to a backroom where the hostile Gold Pig, who keeps Red's missing arm, awaits. Gold Pig throws Red into an incinerator, an almost-unwinnable battle. If Red loses, the disembodied voice offers the player an "Absolute Truth"—that death is not the end—and brings Red back.

Whether they live or have to be brought back, the incinerator breaks down, Red exits it, and discovers that Gold Pig has stolen Blue Thief's legs and abandoned them. They set out together to find Gold Pig, retrieve their stolen limbs, and understand the nature of Everhood. Along the way, the two meet and are attacked by many of Everhood's residents, including a sentient trash can, Professor Orange and their assistant Grundall, and the insane Green Mage.

Red and Blue Thief eventually travel to Gold Pig's temple and fight them. After losing to Red and being pressured by their allies, Gold Pig returns Blue Thief and Red’s limbs. After retrieving their arm, Red is interrupted by Frog, who reveals that Everhood’s inhabitants are eons-old immortals suffering from an eternity of boredom and stagnation, and tasks the player to "free" them by ending their existence.

Red is then returned to Gold Pig's temple, and begins their mission to bring Everhood to an end. They can now return to the various realms to kill the characters they have met along the way, many of whom refuse to die and will put up a fight, though a few willingly accept their fate. Alternatively, they can avoid killing anyone, to the anger of Frog.

If the player chooses to kill everyone, the recurring Lost Spirits guide Red to killing the sun itself, the force which was keeping them stuck in Everhood. Afterwards, the disembodied voice from earlier begins a process of "Reconciliation", in which Red faces the spirits of those they’ve killed, until a humanoid figure named Pink interrupts the fight and reveals themselves to have been using Red as a vessel. They were previously given the player's role of ending the world's existence earlier on, but quit partway through.

The spirits accept Pink’s explanation, and Pink leaves to kill the disembodied voice, revealed to be the universe itself. After doing so, they, the spirits of everyone else, and a figure resembling the Buddha say their farewells to the world in the form of one last battle. In the end, the player may choose to learn the last "Absolute Truth"—that there are no absolute truths.

Alternatively, if the player refuses to kill anyone, Frog attempts to force the player to do so via a battle. If Frog is not killed during the battle, they reveal themselves to be a Lost Spirit trapped in the world, and the disembodied voice lets them out. From this point, the player may leave the world as it is, or return to finish Frog's mission. Endings besides this and the normal ending include one where the player kills the developers. one where the player walks down an exceedingly long corridor, and another where Red is destroyed and Professor Orange subsequently creates a new body for Pink to inhabit, known as Yellow; the events of this last alternate ending are referenced in Everhood 2.

== Gameplay ==
Everhood features a rhythm-based battle system using five lanes.

Everhood is an adventure RPG that focuses on a battle system based on a rhythm game as opposed to a strategy or turn-based combat system. Exploration of the game's world is done by navigating various environments from a top-down perspective. Everhood's environments are largely characterized by minimalistic designs against black backgrounds, with few branching paths to explore or secrets to find. In each location, the player can interact with various characters or face different minigames and puzzles, each of which gives a reward to progress the plot or one of several sidequests.

Much of the game's focus is on its battle system. The battlefield consists of five lanes resembling those present in the Guitar Hero series. Attacks timed with the music appear and move downwards towards the player at the bottom of the lanes; the player can jump left to right to dodge these oncoming attacks. Each enemy in the game has their own battle theme, and will time their attacks to the song's beat. At the beginning of the game, attacks can only be avoided by jumping over them or dodging to the side, but after acquiring Red's stolen arm, the player can absorb attacks and fire them back at the enemy. The difficulty level, which can be changed at any time between battles, only affects the amount of health the player and enemies have, rather than causing the enemies' attack patterns to change. After completing the game, the player can begin again in new game plus, which grants access to additional content.

== Development ==
"Why Oh You Are L O V E"
A song by Dancefloor is Lava that appears in Everhood. Battles in the game were built around songs, rather than songs being composed to fit the battles.

Everhood began development in 2018 as a collaboration between Spanish game developer Jordi Roca and Swedish visual effects artist Chris Nordgren. At the time, Roca was a freelance developer with a background in mobile development from studio LittleStone, and Nordgren was working as an artist for Mojang Studios on the team for Minecraft Dungeons. The two started development of a game together that wouldn't compete with the projects they were already working on. A demo of Everhood was released on Game Jolt and itch.io in August 2018, and development of a full release was announced in December of that year. The demo took 4-5 months to create. The game was built using Unity; battles were designed by starting with a song, then developing a character concept that would fit it. Musical artists would generally develop a song based on a theme that developers Nordgren and Roca would then work around to create a character and battle that matched; for more pivotal battles, musical composition was more pointedly directed to deliver the desired effect within the story. The story was largely improvised as development went on. Nordgren stated that the game's main theme is that the journey is "something [that] we should cherish". He has noted Undertale as a major inspiration; another cited inspiration is Yume Nikki.

During development, Nordgren started experiencing severe pain that made it difficult to perform basic tasks. He was diagnosed with type 1 diabetes in May 2019. The game was being developed in chronological order, and around the time of Nordgren's illness, it had been developed up to the point of Red retrieving his arm, but not tested, and was thought to be 60 to 80% complete. According to Roca, Nordgren's failing health informed the themes of the latter half of the game, which revolve around uncertainty towards the future. Nordgren quickly recovered after receiving medication, and was able to dedicate more of his time to working on Everhood. The latter half took longer to develop than the first half despite reusing many of the same assets, as it required a lot more playtesting and discussion.

The developers' studio name, Foreign Gnomes, was chosen because of the importance of gnomes to Everhood and the members' difference in nationality. It was used in place of the phrase "created by Chris Nordgren and Jordi Roca", which was "too long" to use repeatedly. Everhood's subtitle, "An Ineffable Tale of the Inexpressible Divine Moments of Truth", is taken from combining the names of three albums by psybient music group Shpongle. Everhood was originally planned to release in the fourth quarter of 2020, but the release was delayed to 2021 so as to avoid competing with bigger titles. During the development period after making the choice to delay the game, four of the five possible endings were added in.

== Reception ==
Reception

Aggregate scores
Aggregator	Score
Metacritic	(NS) 81/100 (PC) 81/100 (XB) 86/100
OpenCritic	77% recommend

Review scores
Publication	Score
Destructoid	7/10
Eurogamer	7/10
Hardcore Gamer	4.5/5
Jeuxvideo.com	15/20
Nintendo Life	9/10
Nintendo World Report	9.5/10
RPGamer	4/5
RPGFan	90/100
TouchArcade	4/5
Screen Rant	4.5/5

Everhood received positive reviews upon its release, with several reviewers commenting on the variety of musical scores and high level of quality in how battles are presented. The PlayStation versions of the game, released in 2023, received scores of 7 and 8/10. Issues raised were the potentially overwhelming visuals and lack of differences between difficulty levels.

Zoey Handley of Destructoid praised the music in the game, but noted that the story threw in too many plot twists. Alana Hagues and Ollie Reynolds, writing for RPGFan and Nintendo Life, respectively, found the game's musical score to be one of its highlights, particularly its variation and ability to combine with the unique visuals during fights. A review from Jeuxvideo.com highlighted the soundtrack as well, while also noting that a mode existed to allow the player to ignore the story and simply play through the battles, experiencing the music again.

Nintendo World Report's Jordan Rudek praised the game's rhythm-based combat and humor and called it "an instant classic", though he also noted the grammar and spelling errors within the game and long loading times. These issues were raised by other reviewers, such as those writing for Destructoid, RPGamer, and Hardcore Gamer.

Some writers drew parallels to the game's inspiration Undertale in their reviews, describing the two games' unconventional approach to the RPG genre. Shaun Musgrave wrote briefly on the game for TouchArcade, stating that it borrowed a bit too heavily from Undertale and also finding the game fairly short and the gameplay difficult to immediately grasp. An Everhood review on Jeuxvideo.com compared the universes of Everhood and Undertale, describing them as having a similar innocence that peeled away as the game went on and darker secrets underneath—though some mysteries in Everhood remain up for interpretation even by the very end of the game. In a review for Eurogamer, Antonino Fiore described Everhood as the "anti-Undertale" in its themes, but also found that it had difficulty differentiating itself from its inspiration. Jordan Helm, writing for Hardcore Gamer, noted in particular how Everhood's climax mirrored the formula taken by Undertale, both due to the impact of its story and its soundtrack, but also compared it to similar moments from the games Nier: Automata and Tetris Effect.

== Rerelease and sequel ==
Developer and publisher BlitWorks worked on an expanded rerelease of Everhood, titled Everhood: Eternity Edition, which includes 16 additional battles with music from 10 artists: Chipzel, David Wise, Disasterpeace, Manami Matsumae, Keiji Yamagishi, YMCK, Gonzalo Varela, Stefan Moser, AceMan and Evan Goertzen. These extra ("eternity") battles are unlocked through story progression, but do not appear within the story itself. In addition to releasing on Microsoft Windows and Nintendo Switch like the original Everhood, Eternity Edition was also available on PlayStation 4, PlayStation 5, Xbox One and Xbox Series X/S.

In June 2023, publisher Foreign Gnomes announced a sequel titled Everhood 2. It released March 4, 2025 on Microsoft Windows and Nintendo Switch, exactly four years after the release of Everhood. Everhood 2 takes place in the same setting as Everhood, though its story is largely disconnected. The game received "generally favorable" reception overall, but was described by some reviewers as not reaching the same highs as the original Everhood.
