= One Piece Odyssey =

2023 video game

- Developers: ILCA; Arstech Guild (Switch port)
- Publisher: Bandai Namco Entertainment
- Directors: Tomohiko Saito; Daisuke Goto
- Producers: Kiyotaka Fujii; Masaru Nakamura; Katsuaki Tsuzuki
- Programmers: Satoshi Nishimura; Yoshio Hara
- Artists: Atsushi Numata; Eiichiro Oda
- Writer: Hitoshi Nishio
- Composer: Motoi Sakuraba
- Engine: Unreal Engine 4
- Platforms: PlayStation 4; PlayStation 5; Windows; Xbox Series X/S; Nintendo Switch
- Release: PS4, PS5, Windows, Xbox Series X/S: JP: January 12, 2023; WW: January 13, 2023; Nintendo Switch: JP: July 25, 2024; WW: July 26, 2024
- Genre: Role-playing
- Mode: Single-player

One Piece Odyssey is a 2023 role-playing video game developed by ILCA and published by Bandai Namco Entertainment. A part of the One Piece franchise, it was released for PlayStation 4, PlayStation 5, Windows, and Xbox Series X/S. It was also released for Nintendo Switch on July 25, 2024.

== Gameplay ==
One Piece Odyssey is a turn-based role-playing game in which players control Monkey D. Luffy and the Straw Hat Pirates. Every playable character has a unique ability in line with their powers, which are used for traversal, collecting items, and solving puzzles. After engaging an enemy in the field, the game transitions to the battle screen, where the characters' actions are controlled using menu commands. The combat system revolves around "Scramble Area Battles" system, where battles are divided into several areas.

Players can optimize the positions of party members between areas to counter opponents. In some battles a random element of the system titled "Dramatic Scene" places the player in inconvenient situations playing to the characters' personalities, such as Sanji being unable to attack because he is surrounded by women, and overcoming them nets greater rewards. As with other games in the genre, the party members earn experience points after battle and level up once enough points are accumulated.

== Development ==
One Piece Odyssey was announced on March 28, 2022, as part of the One Piece franchise's 25th anniversary. It was developed by ILCA and published by Bandai Namco Entertainment and released for PlayStation 4, PlayStation 5, Windows, and Xbox Series X/S on January 13, 2023. The game's soundtrack was composed by Motoi Sakuraba.

A tie-in short story was published in One Piece Magazine Vol. 16 in 2023.

== Reception ==
Reception

Aggregate scores
Aggregator	Score
Metacritic	(PC) 77/100 (PS5) 73/100 (XSXS) 77/100
OpenCritic	60% recommend (Note: Based on 113 reviews)

Review scores
Publication	Score
Digital Trends	4/5
Easy Allies	7.5/10
Famitsu	31/40
Game Informer	7.5/10
GameSpot	5/10
Hardcore Gamer	3.5/5
IGN	7/10
PC Gamer (US)	78/100
Push Square	8/10
RPGFan	72/100
Shacknews	9/10
The Guardian	4/5

One Piece Odyssey received "generally favorable" reviews for the Windows and Xbox Series X/S versions but received "mixed or average" reviews for the PlayStation 5 version, according to review aggregator Metacritic.

The PlayStation 4 version of One Piece Odyssey was the second bestselling retail game throughout its first week of release in Japan, with 35,123 physical copies being sold. The PlayStation 5 version was the third bestselling retail game in the country throughout the same week, selling 26,879 physical copies.
