= Anomaly Collapse =

2024 video game

- Developer: RocketPunch Games
- Publisher: Spiral Up Games
- Composer: Jianan Wang
- Platforms: Windows; Nintendo Switch
- Release: Windows: WW: April 12, 2024; Nintendo Switch: WW: July 17, 2025
- Genres: Turn-based strategy, roguelike
- Mode: Single-player

Anomaly Collapse is a 2024 turn-based strategy roguelite video game developed by RocketPunch Games, and published by Spiral Up Games. The game was released on April 12, 2024, for Microsoft Windows, followed by a Nintendo Switch port on July 17, 2025.

== Development ==
Anomaly Collapse is developed by RocketPunch Games, an independent game development studio from China.

The game was announced in September 2023, albeit no release date was given. In October the same year, a limited 2-week global playtest was launched lasting from October 17 until 31.

Prior to its launch, from January 10 to April 11 of 2024, the game had a limited-run free demo. In March the same year, the companies announced its release date as April 12. In April 2025, a Nintendo Switch port was announced. In July the same year, RocketPunch announced a July 17 release.

== Reception ==
Isaac Todd, from Rice Digital, praised the cute visuals and combat system, but criticized some "balancing issues" and that it "doesn't do the best job of onboarding new players."
