= Stray Children =

2024 video game

- English key artwork
- Developer: Onion Games
- Publisher: Onion Games
- Platforms: Windows; Nintendo Switch
- Genre: Role-playing video game
- Mode: Single-player

Stray Children is a role-playing video game developed by Onion Games, a games company formed by members of Love-de-Lic. It was released in Japan on December 26, 2024, and October 30, 2025, worldwide. The game begins with a child being sucked into a television set into a world inhabited with children that have put up a wall to protect themselves from "Olders", adults that have become monstrous because of their inadequacies and personal issues.

== Development and release ==
The game makes several references to Moon: Remix RPG Adventure, released in 1997 by Love-de-Lic. It has been compared to Undertale, in part due to its gameplay involving battles with both bullet hell mechanics and the ability to talk to opponents to break through their defences. Developer Yoshiro Kimura has stated that Undertale was an influence on Stray Children.

Stray Children was revealed in a Nintendo Direct on September 14, 2023, where the game's Japanese release date was announced for the coming winter. An English release was teased but no release date was given at the time. It released on Nintendo Switch in Japan on December 26, 2024. The worldwide release on Switch and through Steam occurred on October 30, 2025.
