= Slots & Daggers =

2025 video game

- Developer: Friedemann
- Publisher: Future Friends Games
- Engine: Unity
- Platforms: Windows, MacOS
- Release: October 24, 2025
- Genre: Roguelike
- Mode: Single-player

Slots & Daggers is an indie roguelike video game developed by Berlin-based creator Friedemann and published by Future Friends Games. It was released for Windows and MacOS on October 24, 2025. Styled as a diegetic slot machine-like tabletop device in a fantasy pub, the unseen player must attempt to beat the roguelike fantasy game on the machine. It was positively received by critics, who praised its gameplay and visual appearance.

On August 17, 2026, Slots & Daggers was released on Android and iOS. The mobile version fully preserves the gameplay and all content of the original game.

== Gameplay ==
The player starts by choosing three "symbols" (equipment) of their choice, including weapons, shields or coin items. They then select an area to start with; players may continue from later areas once they unlock that area, and are awarded coins equivalent to the progression up to that point. The game is played as a series of battles within each area, during which players must play reflex-based minigames to score critical hits on enemies. After combat, the player may access a shop and buy or level up equipment or passive abilities using tokens released by the machine during gameplay. Tokens can also be spent to use certain passive abilities. Upon the game's end, the slot machine releases poker chips that can be used to purchase illicit modification microchips to make the game easier.

Besides the linear campaign, the game also features an endless mode known as Egg Arena comprised purely of increasingly powerful egg-type monsters.

== Plot ==
The game parodies fantasy worldbuilding with a somewhat nonsensical and vague story told in snippets of text before certain areas, but it revolves around the player traveling the land trying to wipe out the minions of Lord Slothor, which they are able to do successfully upon beating the game.

== Reception ==
Deven McClure of Polygon called the game good to play in short bursts, describing "the art direction, music, and overall aura" of the game as "immaculate". Ali Jones of GamesRadar+ described it as "a strong entry in a crowded field", saying that he "fell in love with" the game. Joel Petterson of Gamereactor praised the game's "lovely" graphical style, but criticized it as having limited content and being repetitive. Nic Reuben of Rock Paper Shotgun described the game as "tomfoolery", saying that he was "delighted by both the crunchy drum machines and chucklesome weirdos".
