= Sand Land (video game) =

2024 video game

- Developer: ILCA
- Publisher: Bandai Namco Entertainment
- Producers: Keishu Minami; Kazumasa Habu
- Engine: Unreal Engine 5
- Platforms: Microsoft Windows; PlayStation 4; PlayStation 5; Xbox Series X/S
- Release: JP: April 25, 2024; WW: April 26, 2024
- Genre: Action role-playing
- Mode: Single-player

Sand Land is an action role-playing video game developed by ILCA and published by Bandai Namco Entertainment. The game is based on Sand Land, a Japanese manga series created by Akira Toriyama in 2000. It is one of the last projects to have any involvement by Toriyama before his death on March 1, 2024. It was released for PlayStation 4, PlayStation 5, Windows, and Xbox Series X/S in April 2024. Upon release, it received mixed reviews from critics, though its fidelity to the style of original author Akira Toriyama and vehicle gameplay were praised.

== Gameplay ==
Based on Sand Land, the game follows the story of Beelzebub, Rao, Ann and Thief as they embark on a journey through the desert to locate a Legendary Spring while battling against dangerous monsters and the army of a malevolent king. Beelzebub is the game's main playable character, and the game is played from a third-person perspective. There are two modes of melee attack; light attacks are fast but weak, and heavy attacks are slow but strong. Players can also dodge opponent's attacks mid-air or sideways. As players progress in the game, they will unlock new skills and special abilities, which enhance Beelzebub's combat capabilities. Drinking water in the game increases Beelzebub's health. Players can also unlock new skills for Beelzebub's companions, who will also assist the player during combat.

The game features a variety of vehicles that can be used for transversal. For instance, the hovercar allows players to float over water and move in wetlands and rough terrain quickly. They can also be used during combat scenarios, especially when fighting against larger enemies. Beelzebub can carry up to five vehicle capsules at a given time. The vehicles can be customized extensively with new engine parts and weapons. They can also be upgraded to boost their durability in combat. Beelzebub and his crew will establish their basecamp in the city of Spino. Players can customize their characters' personal living quarters extensively with furniture and various decorative items. As players progress in the game and completes side objectives, they will meet other non-playable characters, some of which may stay in Spino, granting players the opportunities to buy rare components or services. There are also other side activities in the game, including racing and bounty hunting, and competing in battle arenas against other tough enemies.

== Development and release ==
Sand Land was developed by ILCA and published by Bandai Namco Entertainment. The game is based on Sand Land, a Japanese manga series written and illustrated by Akira Toriyama in 2000. Producer Keishu Minami explained that the work was chosen because it has been translated into many different languages and therefore has fans all over the world. He said the team wanted to include open-world elements based on the original story of a car adventure through the desert to find a Legendary Spring in order to emphasize action and create an immersive experience. Feeling it we would be difficult to fully convey the appeal if the game only had action for the main character Beelzebub, they placed more emphasis on vehicles and customizing them. The project was supervised by both Shueisha and Toriyama himself, and players do not need to be familiar with the manga to understand the story of the game. The game features "Forest Land", a new locale that Toriyama created for the 2024 original net animation adaptation of Sand Land. It provides contrast from the original desert setting, both in terms of visuals and the monsters that appear, as well as an increase in strength for the military enemies. The game also includes references to Toriyama's other works, namely with the different mechs, as the tank was the only one to appear in the original manga.

In December 2022, Bandai Namco announced that they had initiated the "Sand Land Project" which would turn Sand Land into a multimedia intellectual property, with an animated film adaptation announced. The video game project was officially revealed in June 2023. A playable demo for the game was released on March 18, 2024. Sand Land was released for PlayStation 4, PlayStation 5, Windows, and Xbox Series X/S on April 25, 2024, in Japan, and the following day worldwide.

== Reception ==
Reception

Aggregate score
Aggregator	Score
Metacritic	PC: 75/100; PS5: 71/100; XSXS: 72/100

Review scores
Publication	Score
Eurogamer	4/5
Famitsu	35/40
IGN	6/10
PC Gamer (US)	65/100

According to Famitsu, Sand Land sold 11,264 units in Japan its first week, 7,810 on PlayStation 5 and 3,454 on PlayStation 4. It received "mixed or average" reviews from critics, according to review aggregator website Metacritic. In Japan, four critics from Famitsu gave the game a total score of 35 out of 40.

In a four out of five star review for Eurogamer, Lewis Parker called Sand Land a rare example of an "anime game" that actually elevates and improves the story it was based on, as well as a "wonderful final reminder" of the impact that Toriyama has had on the gaming industry. Although appearing to be an action RPG on the surface, he noted it to largely be a vehicular combat game that also contains platforming sections, stealth missions and many side quests. A fan of the original manga, Parker called the new storyline in the second half of the game "brilliant" and arguably better than the first.

Michael Higham of IGN called Sand Land competent in several respects, with a few moments of brilliance, "but for the most part, a simply okay adventure". Immediately hooked by its story premise, he cited the game's vehicle system as its best quality; seamlessly switching between vehicles, each with their specific quirks, for traversal, puzzle solving, and stealth sections that contrast with the explosive mech and tank battles. Estimating 70% of the game to rely on vehicular combat, Higham called the other 30%, which relies on hand-to-hand combat, to be a "glaring shortcoming" that turns into button-mashing.
