= ILCA (company) =

Japanese video game developer

ILCA, Inc.
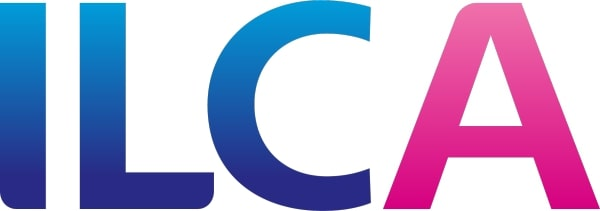
- Native name: 株式会社イルカ
- Romanized name: Kabushikigaisha iruka
- Type: Private
- Industry: Video games Computer graphics video production
- Founded: October 1, 2010; 15 years ago
- Headquarters: Shinjuku, Tokyo, Japan
- Number of locations: 7 (2024)
- Key people: Takuya Iwasaki (CEO)
- Number of employees: 397 (2025/04)
- Website: www.ilca.co.jp

ILCA, Inc. (Note: Japanese: 株式会社イルカ, Hepburn: Kabushikigaisha iruka; Acronym for "I Love Computer Art") is a Japanese video game developer based in Tokyo. The studio is most known for developing Pokémon Brilliant Diamond and Shining Pearl (2021) and One Piece Odyssey (2023). The company also has offices based in Nagoya, Kyoto, and Kobe.

== History ==
ILCA was formed by former Cavia employees on October 1, 2010, in Tokyo, Japan, with the studio's name being an acronym of the phrase "I Love Computer Art". In 2017, ILCA formed TIA as a joint venture with Anima; Toho would eventually buy out Anima's stake and rename the studio Toho Animation Studio in 2022.

While the company initially started out as a CG-based video production company, it eventually branched out to work on video game projects. It has worked as a support studio for games such as Yakuza 0, Dragon Quest XI: Echoes of an Elusive Age, Nier: Automata, Naruto Shippuden: Ultimate Ninja Storm 4 and Ace Combat 7: Skies Unknown, as well as applications such as Pokémon Home. In 2020, it was announced that the director for Monster Hunter World: Iceborne, Daisuke Ichihara, had joined ILCA's Kyoto office.

The studio received more attention when it was revealed as the lead developer for Pokémon Brilliant Diamond and Shining Pearl (2021). It had since then developed a close relationship with publisher Bandai Namco Entertainment, working on games such as The Idolmaster Starlit Season, One Piece Odyssey and Sand Land.

They formed a new studio named Bandai Namco Aces with Bandai Namco in 2022 to work on the next Ace Combat games. Bandai Namco will own 51% of the new studio, while ILCA will own the remaining 49%. The game, titled Ace Combat 8: Wings of Theve, is set to be released in October 2026.

The company founded The Pokémon Works in 2024 as a joint venture alongside The Pokémon Company to develop games in the Pokémon series.

== Games ==
Year	Title	Platform(s)	Publisher
2020	Pokémon Home	Nintendo Switch, Android, iOS	Nintendo/The Pokémon Company
2021	The Idolmaster Starlit Season	Windows, PlayStation 4	Bandai Namco Entertainment
2021	Pokémon Brilliant Diamond and Shining Pearl	Nintendo Switch	Nintendo/The Pokémon Company
2023	One Piece Odyssey	Windows, PlayStation 4, PlayStation 5, Xbox Series X/S, Nintendo Switch	Bandai Namco Entertainment
2024	Sand Land	Windows, PlayStation 4, PlayStation 5, Xbox Series X/S	Bandai Namco Entertainment
2025	The Idolmaster: Tours	Arcade	Bandai Namco Entertainment
2027	Rev. NOiR	Windows, PlayStation 5, Xbox Series X/S	Konami Digital Entertainment
