= Inkbound =

2024 video game

- Developer: Shiny Shoe
- Publisher: Shiny Shoe
- Platform: Windows
- Release: 9 April 2024
- Genres: Turn-based tactics, role-playing game, roguelike
- Modes: Single-player, multiplayer

Inkbound is a 2024 turn-based tactics video game where one to four players fight through a series of monster encounters. Encounters are turn-based; on each turn players can move their character up to a certain distance, and receive a certain amount of mana to use on abilities. The game is presented in an isometric view, and each turn players are given perfect information on what actions enemies will take and how much damage they will deal. Each encounter is time-limited by a circle that shrinks each turn.

Developed and published by Shiny Shoe, Inkbound was released into early access in May 2023, and was fully released on 9 April 2024 for Windows. Inkbound received "generally favorable" reviews. Critics praised the balance, pace, and variety of gameplay, while being more critical of the art and interface.

== Gameplay ==
Inkbound is a turn-based, role-playing and roguelike game for one to four players. Players control Needless, servants of a library world, who fight monsters in order to rewrite history. These monsters are fought in a series of turn-based encounters, on each turn players can move their character up to a certain distance, and receive a certain amount of mana to use on abilities. Players are given perfect information on what actions enemies will take and how much damage they will deal. Each encounter is time-limited by a circle that shrinks each turn.

Inkbound is structured into runs. In each run, players choose one of several character classes known as aspects, each of which begins with a starting set of abilities. These abilities can be replaced and upgraded with rewards throughout the run. Players can also obtain items called vestiges, which grant a specific buff throughout the run. Vestiges are grouped into item sets, and having enough vestiges from the same item set grants additional buffs. Players can hold a limited number of vestiges at once; they can opt to destroy vestiges to free up space while gaining permanent buffs.

== Development and release ==
Inkbound was developed and published by Shiny Shoe, a San Francisco-based studio founded in 2011 and best known for Monster Train (2020). According to CEO Mark Cooke of Shiny Shoe, the studio wanted to develop a cooperative multiplayer game after publishing Monster Train. There was tension at Shiny Shoe over whether to support a single-player experience; the released game is playable in single-player or multiplayer and Cooke described "multiplayer remaining a fun way to play but not pushed as far as it could have been if we had gone co-op only".

Development began in 2021. Inkbound was announced in June 2022 and released into early access in May 2023. The initial version featured a paid season pass for cosmetics, on top of being a paid title. Cooke said this was a business decision to sustain long-term updates for the game, describing a plan that "All gameplay, content updates are going to be free to any owner of the game." This monetization model was criticized upon release, with Cooke saying that Shiny Shoe was "blindsided by the amount of negative feedback", leading them to remove the season pass and instead plan for paid DLC.

Inkbound was fully released on 9 April 2024 for Windows. A content update released on 25 June 2024 added new vestiges and gamemodes. No further major updates were released, and one year after release, Shiny Shoe stated: "Although we aren't able to continue forward with Inkbound as we would have liked, we're very proud of what we accomplished and how we were able to finish the game". Shiny Shoe went on to release Monster Train 2 (2025).

== Reception ==
Reception

Aggregate scores
Aggregator	Score
Metacritic	80/100
OpenCritic	90% recommend

Review scores
Publication	Score
Eurogamer	4/5
MMORPG.com	8.5/10
PC Gamer	70/100
RPGFan	85/100

Inkbound received "generally favorable" reviews according to review aggregator Metacritic. 90% of critics recommended the game, according to OpenCritic.

Writing for PC Gamer, Abbie Stone described the game as "clever yet frustratingly muddled". They described the combat encounters as less reactive than desired and said they sometimes felt impossible. They described the character variety and customization as keeping the game replayable, and described the vestige system as the most original feature and an interesting take on character building. Similarly, Robert Purchese of Eurogamer complimented the amount of content and a feeling of progression, describing the item set mechanic as a type of choice they had not faced before.

RPGFan's Jerry Williams remarked positively on the artistic direction, describing the world as unique and complimenting the visuals and music. Stone described the story as not compelling, and the visual presentation as difficult to interpret, especially in multiplayer. Similarly, Williams considered the game "a tad inaccessible at the start" owing to visual clutter and unexplained mechanics, citing a desire for an in-game encyclopedia. Purchese found the art style "clunky and dated", and described issues with the controls, especially on controller.

Early versions drew positive remarks on the game's potential, with Polygon's Grayson Morley describing it as a "strong foundation" and CG Magazine's Philip Watson saying it was "dripping in potential", while bringing up a perceived lack of story, the interface, and the season pass as issues. Steven Weber, writing for MMORPG.com, described the full release as expanding on the story by introducing voice-acted quests, and improving accessibility by reducing the learning curve and improving the interface and controls. Nevertheless, they felt that even the expanded story "takes a backseat to repetitive dives", and expressed disappointment that the update had not included new aspects.

Multiple reviewers described Inkbound as strongly influenced by Hades (2020).
