= Demonschool =

2025 video game

- Developer: Necrosoft Games
- Publisher: Ysbryd Games
- Designer: Brandon Sheffield
- Platforms: Windows; Linux; macOS; Nintendo Switch; PlayStation 4; PlayStation 5; Xbox One; Xbox Series X/S; Nintendo Switch 2
- Release: November 19, 2025; Nintendo Switch 2; 2026
- Genre: Tactical role-playing game
- Mode: Single-player

Demonschool is a 2025 turn-based tactical role-playing video game developed by Necrosoft Games and published by Ysbryd Games. It was released on November 19, 2025, for the Nintendo Switch, PlayStation 4 and PlayStation 5, Xbox One, Xbox Series X and S and PC. A Nintendo Switch 2 version is set to release in 2026. The player controls a group of demon hunting college students, led by a demon hunter named Faye, as they navigate university life on an island while combating supernatural threats and fighting to stop an impending apocalypse.

Combining turn-based tactics with narrative and social simulation elements, the game emphasizes strategic planning and a hybrid system in which player movement and actions are executed simultaneously. Upon release, the game received generally positive reviews, with critics praising its visual style and plot while noting issues with pacing and flat side content.

== Gameplay ==
Demonschool is a tactical role-playing game where players control a party of demon-hunting college students that combines turn-based strategy combat with social simulation and exploration elements. Gameplay is divided between different sections encompassing these playstyles, with combat taking up the majority of the time. The game takes place in week-based blocks, with time counting down to an apocalypse that the player characters are fighting to stop.

Combat takes place on grid-based maps where players control a party of characters, each with distinct abilities and roles. Unlike more traditional turn-based systems, player actions are planned in advance and then executed simultaneously, allowing for the chaining and repositioning of moves before confirming a turn. This system also allows players to undo moves, allowing for strategic experimentation. The combat has puzzle game elements in the need to "line up" attacks correctly, with players needing to correctly line up their characters to ensure success. The system also encourages the use of as many characters as possible to synergize their attacks and to then give them bonuses in combat.

Outside of combat, players explore a university campus and its surrounding island to progress the plot, interacting with non-player characters and progressing the story. The game allows players to romance certain characters in the game.

== Development ==
Developer Necrosoft Games is based in Oakland, California. Creative Designer Brandon Sheffield set out to create a tactics puzzle game prototype that would be the "smallest tactics game" that he could make. Sheffield thought of the name "Demonschool" while he was in a hotel room, and after doing a search and finding that the URL was available, they decided to make a tactics game aimed at the name. To force them to have creative direction with a limited set of tools, they pretended that they were developing a game for an update to the Sega Saturn, which they hoped would make the game feel "true to its universe."

The game was influenced by the Italian Giallo film genre, particularly in its lighting and sound design. Sheffield noted that the combat was heavily influenced by Valkyria Chronicles, which has both planning phases and "active battles." Sheffield also noted that Jeanne d'Arc for the PSP was an influence in how it simplified traditional tactical systems.

== Reception ==
Reception

Aggregate scores
Aggregator	Score
Metacritic	(PC) 76/100 (NS) 72/100 (PS5) 73/100
OpenCritic	72% recommend

Review scores
Publication	Score
The A.V. Club	C−
Game Informer	8/10
GamesRadar+	4/5
PC Gamer (US)	86/100
RPGamer	4/5

According to the review aggregation website Metacritic, the PC version of Demonschool received generally favorable reviews from critics, while the Nintendo Switch and PlayStation 5 versions both received "mixed or average" reviews from critics. Fellow review aggregator OpenCritic assessed that the game received strong approval, being recommended by 72% of critics.

Reception for Demonschool was mixed, with many critics praising its stylish flair and fun plot, while criticism focused on its repetitive fights and small amount of side content. PC Gamer's Mollie Taylor noted that watching each turn work through your selected moves felt like watching "a miniature performance" and praised its Buffy the Vampire and Persona inspired roots and style. Game Informer's Eric Van Allen described the game as "infectious" and felt that the game fell short on side activities, but was overall a compelling experience.

Criticism focused on the perceived lack of side content and that the game had to stretch itself thin to fill gaps. Slant Magazine's Niv Sultan noted that the side content of the game were chores and "collectively, they lead the game to feel like a chore." The A.V. Club's Moises Taveras felt that the game "punts on the opportunity to do something cooler [...] than playing the hits" and criticized the game for relying too much combat elements.
