= Everhood 2 =

2025 rhythm adventure video game

- Developers: Chris Nordgren; Jordi Roca
- Publisher: Foreign Gnomes
- Composers: Chris Nordgren; Cazok; Stewart Keller; KM_EXP; Dancefloor is Lava
- Engine: Unity
- Platforms: Microsoft Windows; Nintendo Switch
- Release: Windows, Switch; March 4, 2025
- Genres: Adventure, role-playing, rhythm
- Mode: Single-player

Everhood 2 is a 2025 video game developed by Chris Nordgren and Jordi Roca as a sequel to the 2021 game Everhood. First announced in 2023, it was released on Microsoft Windows and Nintendo Switch on March 4, 2025. Though it is not a direct sequel to Everhood, taking place in the same universe but telling a new story, its gameplay mechanics are largely similar, and several characters from the first game make an appearance.

== Plot ==
=== Setting ===
The setting ("universe") of Everhood 2 is stated to be the same as that of the original Everhood. It is later revealed that this story takes place in one of Everhood's alternate endings, where the light being controlling the first game's protagonist was given a new wooden body named Yellow; although the consequences of this ending have little effect on the overarching story of Everhood 2.

=== Story ===
Everhood 2 opens with the player being asked several questions, ranging from technical ("Are you streaming this game right now?") to personal ("Do you play Fortnite?"). This determines the color of the non-gendered player character, which appears in a crudely drawn house on a vast white plain. They chase a stopwatch that bounces across the plain into a hole. Jumping down the hole, the player engages in battle with a mysterious shady figure, before being carried away to safety by Raven, an anthropomorphic raven.

Raven explains that the entity who attacked the player is the Root of All Evil, and in order to defeat it, the player must strengthen themselves by collecting Power Gems scattered across the game's many realms, and obtain their "Soul Weapon" by defeating the Mind Dragon, a physical manifestation of the player's anxieties and trauma. The player is largely free to explore the different realms in any order they choose, among them a kingdom of sentient vegetables at war with a band of rebel fruits, the rooms of various residents in the "infinite" Hillbert Hotel [sic], or a time machine that sends the player to an alien planet in different eras of their civilization. Along the way, the player allies with Sam and Irvine, two minor characters from the first Everhood, along with a tiny frog named Riley who is searching for a figure called the Boatman.

Upon defeating the Mind Dragon and obtaining their Soul Weapon, the player is escorted by Raven to the Mushroom Bureau to seek audience with the wise Divine Mushroom. The Divine Mushroom informs the player that their actions are ultimately meaningless, and that they ought to simply "enjoy the ride." Nevertheless, the player and their allies set out at Riley's suggestion to find the Boatman, the pilot of an interdimensional spaceship, and ask for passage to the Root of All Evil. After passing a trial run, the group finds themselves in Pandemonium, a nightclub at the "end of time," whereupon the player can go back to tie up any loose ends before boarding the ship a second time.

After re-boarding the Boatman's ship, the voyage is diverted by the arrival of the Jester God, Bobo. Defeating Bobo reveals the Root of All Evil, now known as Shade, to have been controlling the player's enemies all along, and now that they are finally "out of puppets" they decide to battle the player one-on-one. Regardless of whether Shade is defeated or not, the player is sent through a lengthy sequence of many different realms before once again confronting them directly. Shade asks whether the player wishes to "become God," but then explains that since the game's world was created for their entertainment in the first place, the player is already its God. Shade instead grants godhood to Riley, who proceeds to take over Everhood and rule as a tyrant.

The player is sent back to the game's world, where they regroup with Sam and Irvine and set out to defeat Riley. The player eventually confronts them alone, but Riley suddenly collapses and dies in the middle of their battle, with Shade reappearing to remark that Riley's body couldn't handle their power. The game abruptly cuts to credits, after which the player has one final encounter with Shade. Shade explains that they are not evil, but simply a manifestation of the player's desire for more action and battles, having set the events of the game into motion for their own enjoyment. Shade challenges the player to one final battle, after which they announce the game's end, but invite the player to come back occasionally as they "find their attention intoxicating." Shade sends the player back to the moment right before they board the Boatman's ship, at which point they can return to the ship to experience the ending sequence again, or explore the game's worlds at their leisure.

== Gameplay ==
A battle in Everhood 2. The player, a 3D model at the bottom of the screen, moves between the different lanes, dodging and reflecting attacks from the enemy hyena.

The gameplay of Everhood 2 is similar to the first Everhood, with the player controlling a light being (rather than a wooden doll) that navigates around a world and engages enemies in combat. Battles are fought by evading or absorbing enemy attacks that approach the player in a field of five columns. Absorbing multiple of the same colored attacks without being hit builds a combo that deals more damage the higher it grows, with no limit to the potential number of absorbed shots. Most bosses have their own soundtrack (though some minor enemies share one track), which usually loops until the end of the fight.

== Release ==
Everhood 2 was announced in June 2023, prior to the release of Everhood: Eternity Edition 3 months later. The release date, March 4, 2025, exactly 4 years after the release of Everhood, was revealed in January 2025.

== Reception ==
Reception

Aggregate scores
Aggregator	Score
Metacritic	(NS) 78/100 (PC) 79/100
OpenCritic	77% recommend

Review scores
Publication	Score
Hardcore Gamer	3.5/5
Nintendo Life	7/10
Nintendo World Report	10/10
Waypoint	Strongly Recommend

Everhood 2 was positively received on both PC and Nintendo Switch, though slightly less strongly on the latter platform. Review aggregator OpenCritic assessed that the game received strong approval, being recommended by 77% of critics. Three days after its release, it received over 500 positive reviews on Steam. The game has been favorably compared to Guitar Hero, Undertale, and Mother.
