= For the King II =

- Developer: IronOak Games
- Publisher: Curve Games
- Director: Sterling Anderson
- Producer: Steven Golding
- Designers: Colby Young; Gordon Moran; Francis Dionne; Marc Kavanagh
- Artist: Gordon Moran
- Composer: John Robert Matz
- Series: For the King
- Engine: Unity
- Platforms: Microsoft Windows; PlayStation 5; Xbox One; Xbox Series X/S
- Release: Microsoft Windows: WW: November 2, 2023; PlayStation 5, Xbox One, Xbox Series X/S: WW: December 12, 2024
- Genre: Tactical role-playing
- Modes: Single-player, multiplayer

For the King II is a tactical role-playing game developed by IronOak Games and published by Curve Games. It is the sequel to For the King (2018).

== Gameplay ==
After the queen from For the King turns evil, adventurers set out to defeat her. For the King II is a tactical role-playing game with turn-based combat. It has roguelite elements, such as a procedurally-generated map and permadeath. Combat takes place on a grid, similar to digital tabletop, and there can be up to four members in each party. There are two rows for each side, allowing weaker characters to hide behind someone with a shield. The difficulty is customizable, but losing causes players to restart the game. Points accrued during gameplay allow players to unlock new content for their next game.

== Development ==
Vancouver-based developer IronOak Games was influenced by Dungeons & Dragons. They also wanted to make the sequel more plot-oriented and emphasize emergent gameplay. Curve Games released it for Windows on November 2, 2023. Ports for PlayStation 5, Xbox One, and Xbox Series X/S were released on December 12, 2024.

== Reception ==
For the King II received positive reviews on Metacritic. PC Gamer said they had fun with the challenging battles, but the game seemed more like a high definition remake of the first game than a sequel. Though IGN found it "interesting, challenging, and engaging", they said some of information withheld from the player made it unnecessarily frustrating.
