= For the King =

2018 video game

- Developer: IronOak Games
- Publisher: Curve Games
- Director: Colby Young
- Engine: Unity
- Platforms: Microsoft Windows; Linux; macOS; Nintendo Switch; Playstation 4; Xbox One
- Release: April 19, 2018
- Genres: Role-playing; Roguelike; Turn-based strategy
- Modes: Single-player; Multiplayer

For the King is a roguelike role-playing video game developed by Canadian game developer IronOak Games and published by Curve Games. It was released in February 2017 to early access on Steam with a full release in April 2018. Gameplay revolves around exploration, clearing dungeons, and collecting new gear and weapons across the fictional land of Fahrul, with both co-op and single-player modes being available. A sequel, For the King II, was released on November 2, 2023.

== Gameplay ==
For the King is a role-playing video game with strategy and roguelike elements. Players may choose from one of several adventures, which offer a unique goal or challenge for the player. Both single-player and co-op playthroughs are available. The arenas for these maps are randomly generated for each playthrough, but overall each adventure is consistent in which towns, enemies, and terrains appear throughout the map. Prior to beginning each adventure, a party is created by the player or players, ranging from one to three characters in size. The cosmetic appearance of each character can be chosen as well as the character's class, which determines starting weapons and gear as well as how strong or weak the character will be in regards to each trait, of which there are seven in the game; strength, vitality, intelligence, awareness, talent, speed, and luck. The value of each trait ranges from 1 to 95, but rarely falls below 40 for a character, with the value corresponding to a percent chance of succeeding at an attack or other action that is associated with the respective trait, making the combat and exploration system behave similar to the dice-based systems of traditional tabletop role-playing games. Unlike many other role-playing games based in the medieval era, the classes in For the King are medieval professions, rather than strictly warfare-based titles. For example, the in-game blacksmith role takes on the traditional 'warrior' or 'tank' class role and the scholar class takes on the traditional 'mage' class role.

The various tiles that comprise the game's map are hexagonal, and the player's character may interact with an enemy or location when their own character is moved onto the same tile. Each character in the party takes turns being able to move and purchase or sell acquired items such as weapons, armor, or consumables. Movement is based on a character's speed trait value on land and talent trait value at sea. When a player initiates combat with an enemy on a particular tile, nearby characters from the party and enemies may join the fight. Additionally, characters may encounter random events in the game which provide an opportunity to obtain benefits such as increased movement, items, or healing. Focus, a resource in the game, may be utilized by characters to increase the chances of desired outcomes in and out of combat and may be replenished by abilities or consumables.

A typical combat scenario in For the King

Like movement across the map, combat is turn-based, with combat being initiated when a player's character is moved to a tile occupied by an enemy with nearby enemies and characters in the created party able to enter a battle. Combat may also be initiated if a character is ambushed by enemies while traversing unoccupied tiles. During the battle, participants may either directly attack one or more opponents, weaken the abilities of an opponent, strengthen the abilities of an ally, or use consumables. Party characters that have their health bar depleted may be revived by allies if lives are remaining in the shared pool, and combat ends either when one side is completely defeated or when one side retreats. Focus may be utilized in a battle to increase the odds of an action or attack succeeding.

In each adventure, players traverse Fahrul and collect gear, complete side quests, battle enemies, and progress in the adventure's respective main questline. The game features a day-night cycle, which can change which enemies are present on the map and whether certain shops are accessible. The various towns throughout the map offer services that replenish focus or health, markets where goods can be bought and sold, and a location where side quests may be started, which can grant large sums of gold, extra lives to the shared pool, or items. These side quests generally involve defeating enemies and acquiring and delivering quest items. An adventure ends when the final dungeon is cleared or when all characters die in a battle. Throughout an adventure, players may accumulate 'lore' which functions as a currency the player may utilize to purchase new classes as well as new points of interest and items that have a chance to appear in future adventures.

== Development ==
For the King's development was undertaken by a core team of three people; Colby Young, Gord Moran, and David Lam, who worked in both the indie and AAA video game industries. The members of the group had previously worked on games such as Ryse: Son of Rome, Dead Rising 2, and the Need for Speed series. The three quit their jobs to form IronOak Games and with personal funds, as well as money raised through a Kickstarter campaign, the game's production was funded. The campaign originally had a goal of CA$40,000 but eventually raised CA$133,661 from over 3,000 backers.

Much of the game's design elements come from a board game concept created by Colby Young several years prior to beginning the project. Young has stated that the game's clean and simple art style was largely inspired by first-generation 3D RPGs and also allowed the small team to easily create greater variety in the environment, items, and characters within the game.

== Reception ==
Reception

Aggregate score
Aggregator	Score
Metacritic	PC: 79/100; Switch: 76/100; PS4: 74/100; XONE: 84/100

Review scores
Publication	Score
Nintendo Life	7/10
PC Gamer (US)	75/100

For the King received "generally favorable" reviews, according to review aggregator Metacritic on the PC, Xbox One, and Nintendo Switch platforms and a "mixed or average" rating on the PlayStation 4. Dom Reseigh-Lincoln writing for Nintendo Life praised the agency granted to players, in particular, the ability of the party characters to split up, adding a unique twist to the gameplay and separated the game from others in the genre. However, Reseigh-Lincoln believed the high variability that resulted from the dice-based combat and exploration system coupled with the difficulty and "permadeath" aspect of the game could create some especially difficult scenarios for the player that left little in their control. Jonothan Bolding of PC Gamer likewise found the gameplay punishing at times but that it ultimately allowed for a rewarding end game. He also found the game's art style to be very enjoyable and at times humorous.
