= Tenderfoot Tactics =

2020 video game

- Publisher: Ice Water Games
- Designers: Badru, Isa Hutchinson, Taylor Thomas, Zoe Vartanian
- Programmer: Badru
- Writers: Badru, Isa Hutchinson
- Composer: Michael Bell
- Platforms: Windows; Linux; macOS; Nintendo Switch; Xbox One; Xbox Series X/S
- Release: Windows, macOS, Linux: WW: October 21, 2020; NS, XBO, XSXS: WW: February 21, 2024
- Genre: Tactical role-playing game
- Mode: Single-player

Tenderfoot Tactics is an indie tactical role-playing game. The player controls a group of goblins to free an archipelago from a corrupting fog. It was released for Windows, macOS, and Linux on October 21, 2020, and later for Nintendo Switch, Xbox One, and Xbox Series X/S on February 21, 2024.

== Gameplay ==
Tenderfoot Tactics is a tactical role-playing game. The player controls a group of goblins, exploring an open world archipelago. Combat occurs in a grid-based, turn-based, deterministic system. Goblins can gain levels and switch roles, gaining elemental abilities that can affect the battlefields.

== Reception ==
Tenderfoot Tactics has received praise for its minimalist aesthetic and distinctive map mechanics. Antal Bokor of the Third Coast Review described it positively as "a sometimes strange, often bleak game set in an acid tripping world" with "remarkable" art. Ewan Wilson of NME rated the game 4 out of 5 stars, calling it "beautiful-looking" and additionally lauding the soundtrack that "recall[s] the main theme from the cult horror film Suspiria". Fraser Brown of PC Gamer appreciated the mysterious feel of the game, calling it "singular and weird and well worth a trip".
