= Brandon Sheffield =

American video game producer and webcomic writer

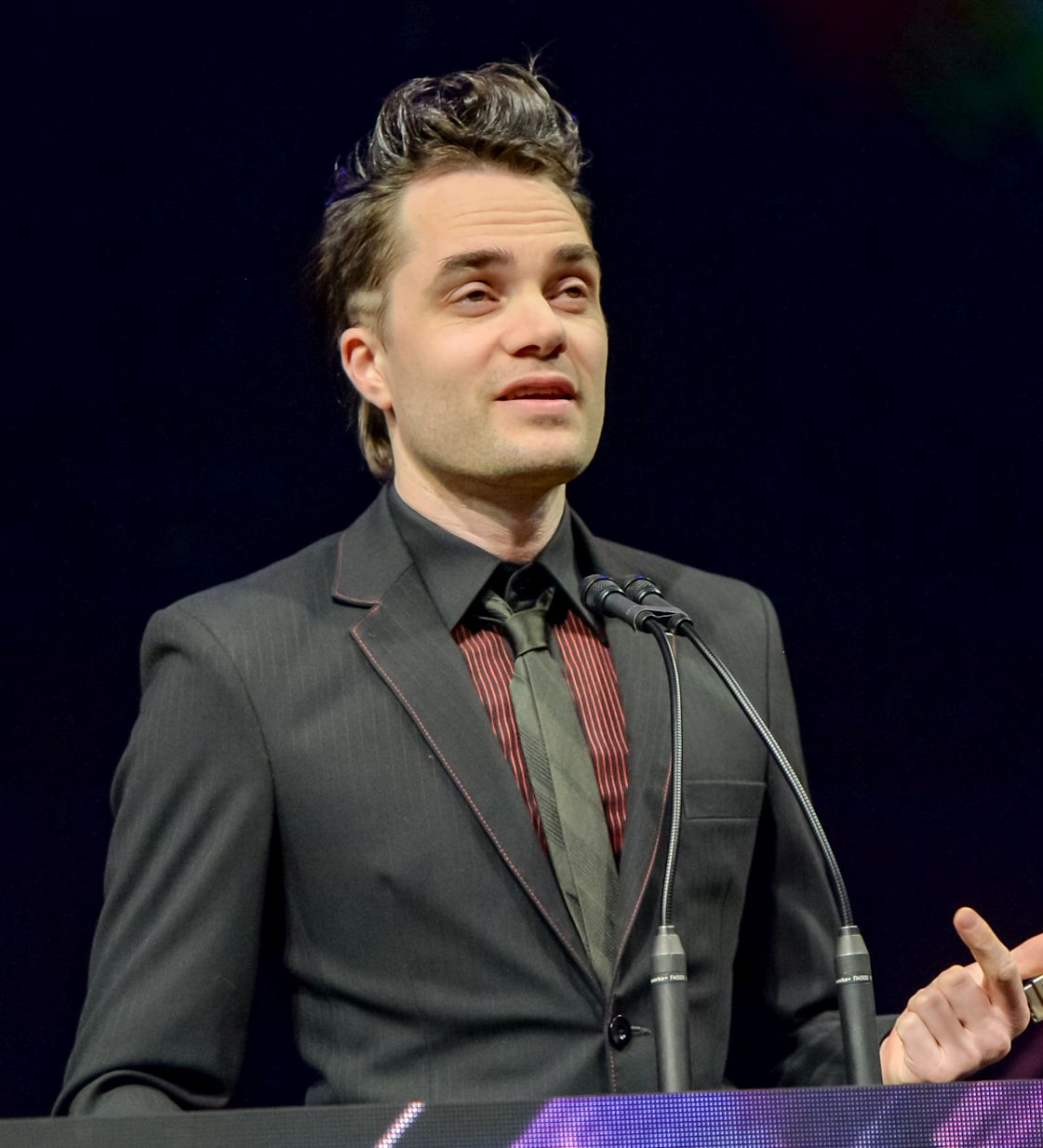
- Sheffield at the 2019 Game Developers Choice Awards
- Born: Oakland, California
- Occupations: Video game producer, webcomic writer
- Known for: Necrosoft Games and No Girlfriend Comics

Brandon Sheffield is a video game director, webcomic writer and podcast host. As the director of Necrosoft Games, Sheffield has created various games for PlayStation Mobile, including Gunsport and Oh Deer!. After going through a breakup in 2014, Sheffield worked together with illustrator Dami Lee to create the webcomic No Girlfriend Comics, which chronicles his experiences of suddenly being single after a two-year relationship. He hosts the Insert Credit Show podcast with his co-hosts, Frank Cifaldi and Alex Jaffe.

== Necrosoft Games ==
As the director of Necrosoft Games, Sheffield has worked on a number of video games for PlayStation Mobile before the service discontinued in September 2015. In February 2015, Sheffield created Gunsport, a "cyberpunk volleyball" game on the PlayStation Vita. Together with video game composer Motohiro Kawashima, whom he met while visiting Ancient Corp's Yuzo Koshiro, Sheffield worked on the racing game Oh Deer!. Inspired by Outrun 2, the game's main mechanics were programmed by Decinoge.

Sheffield was editor-in-chief of Game Developer Magazine and was senior contributing editor at Gamasutra.

== No Girlfriend Comics ==
The first panel of No Girlfriend Comics' final strip.

After Sheffield broke up with his girlfriend in 2014, he started writing brief descriptions of his experiences, such as the awkwardness of leaving the house without a girlfriend and the depressing nature of going to bed alone. Though he felt his emotions were unique to himself, he realized that his reactions and resulting routines were very similar to those of other people that have gone through a break-up. At this point, Sheffield contacted illustrator Dami Lee to turn the stories into comic strips. This project resulted in the webcomic No Girlfriend Comics, which ran on Tapastic from August to December 2014.

Sheffield believes Lee "added bits of herself here and there," making the webcomic more relatable in the process. The series eventually consisted of twenty individual strips, despite fans wanting the series to continue. According to Lee, "it felt right to end it at 20 comics instead of continuing the series; it represented a passing phase that everyone goes through at some point. The comic came to its natural end, just like a lot of relationships."

Sheffield and Lee worked together again to create the webcomic Hot Comics for Cool People, which was syndicated in SF Weekly in 2016.
