= Blood Message =

- Developer: 24 Entertainment Lin'an (Note: Stylized as 24 Entertainment 临安.)
- Publisher: NetEase Games
- Director: Xingyan Gu
- Producers: Zhipeng Hu; Xingyan Gu
- Engine: Unreal Engine 5
- Platforms: PC and consoles
- Genre: Action-adventure
- Mode: Single-player

Blood Message (Note: Simplified Chinese: 归唐; traditional Chinese: 歸唐; pinyin: Guī Táng. The Chinese title roughly translates to "Return to the Tang".) is an upcoming action-adventure game developed by 24 Entertainment Lin'an and published by NetEase Games. The player assumes the role of Pei Changguan, who faces the turmoil of the Shazhou uprising and embarks on a perilous journey across East and Central Asia to deliver a crucial message to Chang'an, the capital of the Tang Empire.

Blood Message is scheduled to be released for PC and consoles.

== Gameplay ==
Blood Message is an action-adventure game. It is played in single-player mode from a third-person perspective.

The player controls the messenger Pei Changguan. The gameplay involves combat blended with stealth mechanics. The combat maneuvers include light attacks, heavy attacks, dodges, blocks, parries, counters, and executions.

The game features a linear story.

== Synopsis ==
=== Setting ===
Blood Message is set across East and Central Asia during the late Tang dynasty. It centers on a group of people who undertake a journey to deliver a crucial message to Chang'an, the capital of the Tang Empire.

Thematically, the developers aimed to highlight the struggle for survival of ordinary individuals against the backdrop of grand historical events. The perspective of common people rather than emperors or generals is used to show the occurrences of the era.

Historically, Zhang Yichao, whose allegiance was with the Tang, led an uprising against the Tubo that resulted in him reclaiming the regions of Guazhou and Shazhou. Following his seizure of Shazhou, he dispatched ten groups of messengers, who were mostly ordinary people, across vast and hostile territories to relay the news to Chang'an. Adapting these actual events, the game places the player in the role of one such messenger. Pei Changguan, who serves as the player character, is a fictional figure created to evoke the heroes who remain 'nameless' in a historical sense.

Jeff Hu, the senior director of global publishing, commented that "[The hero travels with his son] from the Chinese West to the East to deliver a very important message about their victory to the capital of the Tang Dynasty, Chang'an, so we can use different landscapes and let players experience different elements. We chose a very unique angle in that we chose a nameless soldier itself to tell this story, and also combine that with the emotional bond between father and son."

=== Plot ===
Pei Changguan and his son Ning face the turmoil of the Shazhou uprising and embark on a perilous journey across East and Central Asia to deliver a crucial message to Chang'an, the capital of the Tang Empire.

== Development ==
Blood Message is a game developed by 24 Entertainment Lin'an. 24 Entertainment Lin'an is a subsidiary of NetEase Games. The game is built using Unreal Engine 5.

The development team conducted extensive historical research to present a realistic view of the world. Furthermore, in collaboration with the Gansu Provincial Department of Culture and Tourism, the team conducted historical site scanning, geomorphological restoration, cultural relic digitization, ecological detail reproduction, and other work across the Hexi Corridor in order to recreate the character of that region.

== Release ==
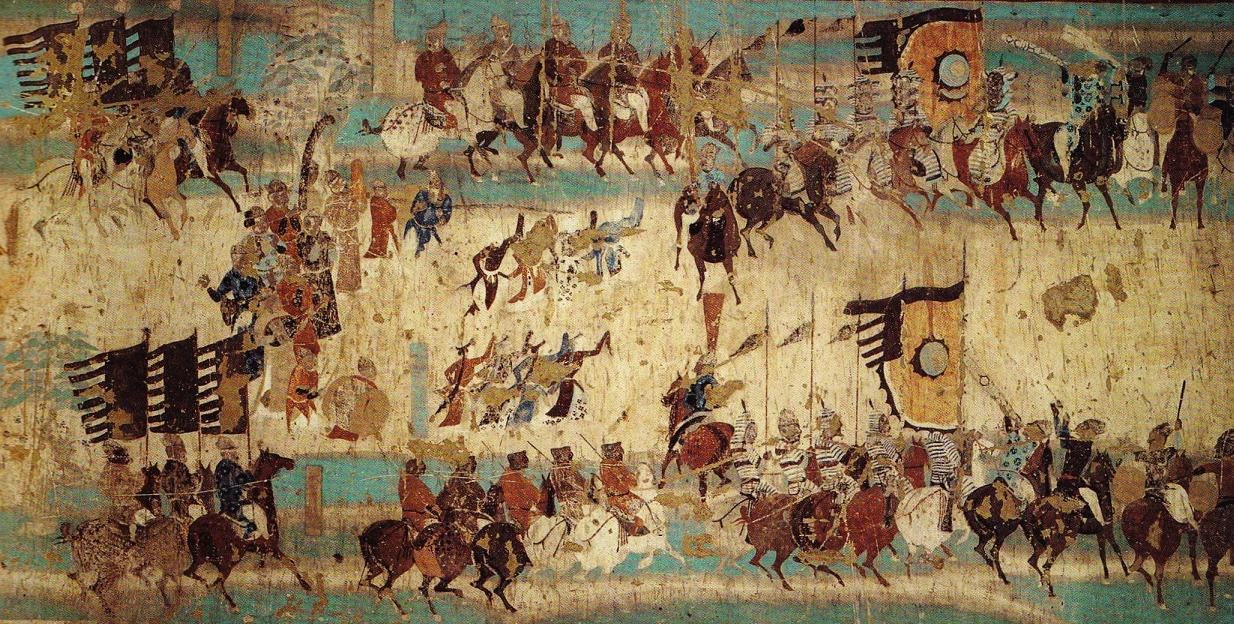
The June 2025 reveal trailer reproduced a Mogao Caves mural, dated to the Tang dynasty, that depicts Zhang Yichao's army.

Blood Message is scheduled to be released for PC and consoles.

Blood Message was unveiled with a trailer on 20 June 2025. The trailer showed game footage, both gameplay and cutscenes, in real-time rendering.

== See also ==
- Naraka: Bladepoint, a game by 24 Entertainment
