= Messiah Engine =

Video game engine by NetEase

- Original author: NetEase
- Platform: Nintendo Switch; PlayStation 4; PlayStation 5; Windows; Xbox One; Xbox Series X/S; iOS; Android
- Type: Game engine
- License: Proprietary

Messiah Engine is an in-house game engine developed by NetEase. It supports multiple platforms including iOS, Android, and PC, with a focus on mobile games.

== History ==
Development of Messiah Engine began in 2007. It was first introduced in 2010, with its first game released in 2013. Zhao Yukun, head of the engine's development, said he was inspired by Edwin Catmull, who developed the Stochastic Sampling algorithm initially used by Pixar RenderMan. The first demo was shown to NetEase founder Ding Lei on an iPad mini 2. The engine now supports multiple platforms: iOS, macOS, Android, PC, PS4/PS5, Switch, and Xbox. NetEase demonstrated the engine at E3 2016 along with its game Tianxia. It has received more than 20 patents.

As of July 2021, the engine has been used to develop 10 games, including Diablo Immortal and Where Winds Meet, as well as many mobile games such as Knives Out, Eternal Arena, A Dream of Jianghu, The Legend of Glory, Ace Racer, and Tank Company.

== Features ==
A major focus of Messiah Engine is efficiently taking advantage of multiple processors. Besides general rendering, physics, and UI threads, Messiah Engine attempts to break down jobs even further into "execution slices," with a queue to manage task dependencies. To support multiple platforms, Messiah Engine uses a hardware abstraction layer composed of three layers: algorithm, translation, and device driver.

The engine supports physically based rendering and real time global illumination.
