= Na Yina =

Chinese Internet celebrity

Zhai Geying
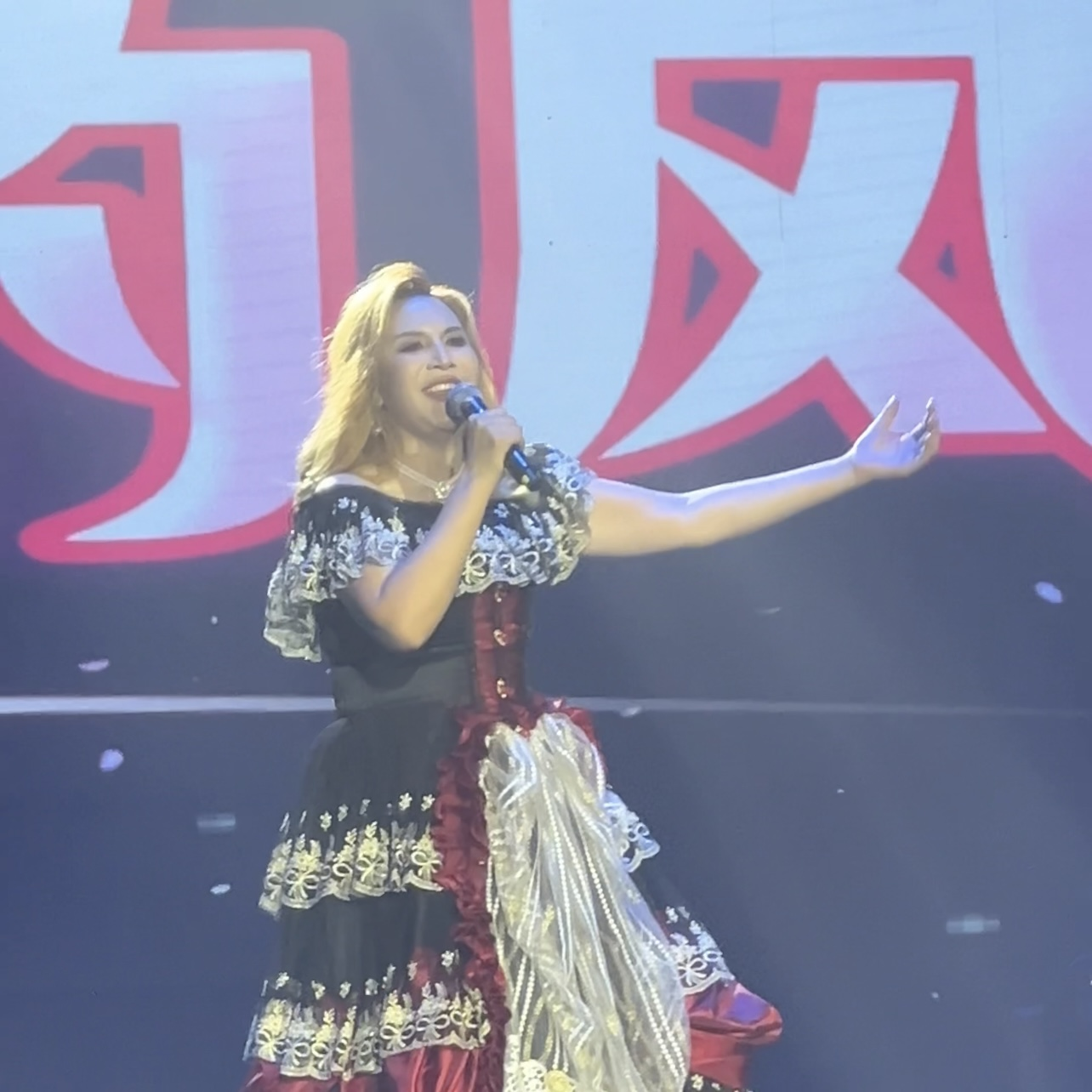
- Born: Zhai Geying; July 11, 1967 (age 58); Zhongxiang, China
- Other names: Na Yina, Lady Nana
- Occupations: Social media personality, singer
- Years active: 2021–present

Zhai Geying (Chinese: 翟革英; born July 11, 1967, in Zhongxiang), known by her stage name Na Yina or sometimes Lady Nana, is a Chinese internet personality and singer. She gained attention on Chinese short-video platforms as "@俄罗斯娜娜" (lit. 'Russia Nana'), portraying herself as a Russian woman using exaggerated accents and face-swapping filters. Her content often featured singing, juxtaposing Russian negativity with Chinese positivity, while monetizing her platform through the sale of Russian products. After her behavior drew criticism from Chinese internet users and state media, her previous account was banned by Douyin. She rebranded as "@大中国娜娜" (lit. 'Great China Nana') and went viral within China's queer community for a video of her clashing with two fellow Douyin influencers, helping her song "Love Like Fire" gain meme popularity and prompting her to pursue a music career.

== Career ==
=== Russian Nana ===
Zhai initially appeared on several short-video platforms in 2021, disguising as a stereotypical Russian woman, and gained significant attention after the Russian invasion of Ukraine in 2022. In her usual videos, she presented facial features typical of Caucasians, greeted audience with Russian, and spoke with a heavily affected, Russian-accented Mandarin. She often praised China by disparaging Russia, occasionally presenting hearsay as facts about Russia. Unlike her spoken Chinese, she performed Chinese songs with accurate pronunciation. She monetized her platform by selling purported Russian products. By April 2022, the account had amassed 1.95 million followers on Douyin and 1.75 million on Kuaishou. According to audience demographics, most of her followers were middle-aged to older adults.

The persona drew widespread skepticism from Chinese netizens, who questioned her accent, identity, and lip-syncing. Notably, in one video where her filter was accidentally removed, she was revealed to have a Chinese appearance, and some even questioned whether she was male. On the evening of April 1, 2022, Douyin announced that her account had been permanently banned for "misusing platform tools, impersonating a false persona, and inappropriately obtaining traffic and followers." In response, Zhai claimed that her previous content had simply been performance art.

=== Queer stardom ===
Two months after her Douyin ban, Zhai returned to social media with a patriotic Chinese persona, dropping the Russian disguise but still using filters and special effects. Replacing the previous old-aged fans, her camp persona drew the attention of China's LGBTQ+ online community.

In December 2022, she became a subject of interest following a livestream conflict with Douyin influencers Sanmeng Qiyuan and Wanbang Wanrenmi, two middle-aged women known for their flamboyant behavior and popular among the Chinese queer community as well. The video went viral among the Chinese queer community, which labeled the trio's quarrel as the "Homosexual Spring Festival Gala". Fans referred to themselves as "Na Army", and covered her song "Love Like Fire" in dance and lip-sync videos. The meme surrounding Zhai's persona helped her song gain popularity among China's LGBTQ+ community, where it was widely played in LGBTQ+ bars and nightclubs, establishing her as a local queer icon. Her heavily filtered facial appearance—combined with controversies over her nationality—also drew comparisons to Chinese-American freestyle skier Eileen Gu. Some internet users speculated that she might be a man in disguise, dubbing her a "mixed blood between male and female"

=== Singer ===
In November 2022, Zhai released the single "Love Like Fire". After the song became a meme among the queer community online, it was featured in the game Eggy Party and reached a broader listener base. Many users on Bilibili created remix videos based on the song. On January 26, 2023, the track entered the QQ Music Mainland Chart for the first time, and from February onward, it consistently topped the rankings. As of February 2024, the song had amassed over 2 billion views across major Chinese short video platforms. Following the success of "Love Like Fire", Zhai released numerous songs, such as "HOTNANA" and "谁能给我爱" (lit. 'Who Can Give Me Love').

Zhai attempted to break into the mainstream but faced challenges, partly due to the heavily regulated media environment in China. In 2023, she appeared on the variety show Star EDM Alliance, co-produced by Youku and Shenzhen TV. However, in 2024 and 2025, respectively, she tried in vain to participate in Hunan TV reality competition shows Ride the Wind 2024 and Singer.

In May 2025, during a concert in Hangzhou, Zhai was accused of lip-syncing when a child's voice was heard during her performance of the song "苹果香" (lit. 'Fragrance of Apples'). In response, she claimed the sound engineer had "played the wrong audio", and explained that the incident was intended as a humorous "meme interaction".

== Musicography ==
=== Original Song ===
Release date	Title	Lyrics	Composition	Arrangement	Producer
2022-11-18	爱如火	Wei Tingting	Wei Tingting	哈魔音乐	
2023-04-29	书中有黄金	Ji Rulei	Sun Yangjie	彬薇物种 BeatWin	Zhang Bing
2023-05-21	爱如火2.0	Ji Rulei	Sun Yangjie	彬薇物种 BeatWin	Zhang Bing
2023-07-27	钟祥趣火子		那艺娜		
2023-08-10	辛劳一生的爸妈	Sun Yangjie, Ji Rulei	Sun Yangjie	子玥音乐/音妳不同	
2023-09-15	火辣的爱赶紧爱	Huang Jie	Huang Jie	沧海音乐	
2023-09-19	恨如冰	Jiang Xinxin	Jiang Xinxin	Wei Ran, Wei Lun	Zhang Bing
2023-10-18	溜达好玩吃肉香	Jiang Xinxin	Jiang Xinxin	Hai Feng, Sun Qian	Zhang Bing
2024-09-20	坚强笨女人	Jiang Xinxin	Jiang Xinxin		Zhang Bing
2024-10-22	火啦火啦				
2024-11-02	HOTNANA	Xiao Ran	Xiao Ran	Ying Qinsi	
2024-11-14	笨笨的我傻傻的活	Na Yina	Guang Zhi	Huang Zheng	
2024-11-19	谢谢钟祥	Na Yina	Guang Zhi	Huang Zheng	Zhang Bing
2024-11-19	那是我来时的路	Na Yina	Guang Zhi	Huang Zheng	Zhang Bing
2024-11-28	陪我过个冬吧	Guang Zhi	Guang Zhi	Huang Zheng	Zhang Bing
2024-12-02	爱如火（CNY version）	Guang Zhi	Guang Zhi	Huang Zheng	Zhang Bing
2024-12-18	勇敢的孩子	Guang Zhi	Guang Zhi	Huang Zheng	Zhang Bing
2025-01-09	谁能给我爱	Xiao Ran	Xiao Ran	Ying Qinsi	

=== Duet ===
Release date	Title	Ft.	Lyrics	Composition	Arrangement	Producer
2024-02-13	你是我的哥	老猫	Jiang Xinxin	老猫	DJ默涵	Zhang Bing
2024-04-01	怦然心动	扇宝	多喝热水	火星漫画	小果@JBP Studio	

=== Cover ===
Release date	Title
2024-10-10	苹果香
2024-11-21	烤串舞
2024-12-17	伤心剖半
2025-01-13	千年等一回
Unpublished	默
