= Youdao =

Search engine by NetEase

Youdao logo.

Youdao (有道) is a search engine released by Chinese internet company NetEase (網易) in 2007. It is the featured search engine of its parent company's web portal, 163.com, and allows users search for web pages, images, news, music, blogs, and Chinese-to-English dictionary entries.

== History ==
Youdao is a subsidiary of NetEase, which develops mobile applications with big data technology. The company has launched Youdao dictionary, along Youdao Cloud Notes, Hui Hui Assistant, and Youdao Tuiguang, using its search engine as a starting point to expand into the area of large-scale data storage.

In December 2007, the Youdao desktop dictionary was formally launched and in January 2009, the first mobile version was released to consumers. It was launched as an online dictionary-like software and featured a whole-paragraph translation service. Translation was based on data from the search engine, along with web data generated by data mining and natural language processing. By the end of July 2012, the dictionary had more than 200 million users globally.

In June 2011, Youdao developed and launched cloud notes as a Cloud storage technology which aimed to help users access data with ease and security. The platform solved existing cross-platform issues with personal information and data management. On December 6, 2011, cloud notes changed its name to "Youdao cloud notes" and by June 2013, Youdao cloud notes had exceeded 15 million users.

On August 2, 2013, NetEase announced that it was cooperating with Qihoo (360 Search) to provide technical support services for their search engine. The company has since abandoned the field to focus on other services, such as Youdao dictionary.
