= Ananta (video game) =

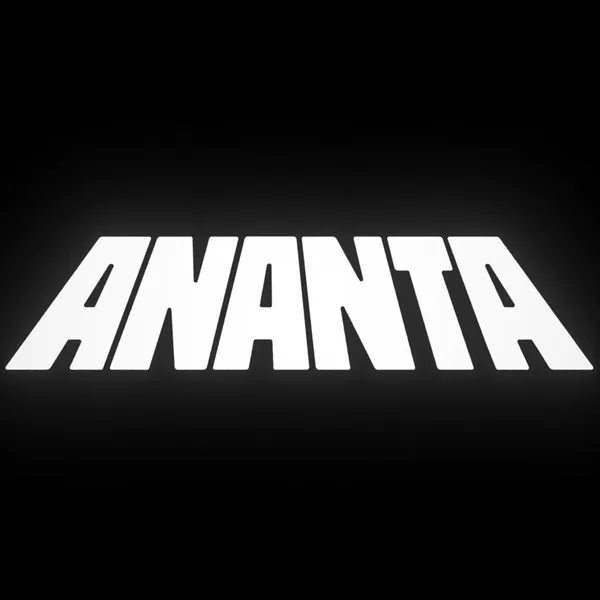
- Developer: Naked Rain
- Publisher: NetEase Games
- Platforms: Android; iOS; PlayStation 5; Windows
- Release: WW: January 15, 2027
- Genre: Action role-playing

Ananta (simplified Chinese: 无限大; traditional Chinese: 無限大; pinyin: Wúxiàndà; lit. 'Infinity', previously Project Mugen) is an upcoming free-to-play open world role-playing video game developed by Naked Rain and published by NetEase Games. It was announced at Gamescom on August 24, 2023, as Project Mugen.

== Gameplay ==
The player can swim in water or navigate the city by running, riding bikes or cars, climbing walls, doing parkour, grappling and swinging between skyscrapers using ropes/appendages similar to the mechanics seen in Marvel's Spider-Man and Alex Mercer from the Prototype franchise. Traverse is fast-paced and requires no stamina. Some characters have unique traverse styles. For example, Taffy's mallet can turn into a bike she can ride. The player can take on various quests and challenges to recover lost memories and unlock various abilities that can help progress in each character's story, culminating into a final plot involving battles against the villain.

The player navigates and fights in the city as one character but can switch between a team of four characters during major battle events and boss fights. Each character has unique stats and abilities which may synergize with teammates. The entire team can also equip an extra buff or major ability such as crowd control or telekinesis.

== Plot ==
=== Setting ===
The game is set in a mystic urban open world where the player can travel around multiple cities by air, land, or sea, populated with pedestrians and foes. The game's first city, called Nova City, is designed in an urban style similar to Tokyo. The second city, Lingyun, takes inspirations from Shanghai and Hangzhou. Other cities will become available later with European and American inspirations. The character can pet cats, play mini-games, race in boats or cars, and interact with most objects in the city, including in combat.

=== Characters ===
The player is cast in the role of a elite Agent of the Anti-Chaos Directorate (A.C.D.), simply referred to as The Captain, who is forced to rebuild the ACD when they discover on their first day that the ACD team and headquarters have been abandoned, and the functions absorbed by the local police force of Nova City. The Captain's gender and name are chosen at the start of the game, and later the player can customize their outfit and car, but their physical build and role in the story will remain mostly the same, with only minor changes in dialogue between the two. There are reportedly over 100 non-player characters in the game that can be interacted with, and building relationships with them will unlock new combat skills or badges.

Outside of the Captain, the game features multiple characters who will be playable later in the game, as the Captain rebuilds the ACD:

- Shi Ye: The Captain's childhood friend who works as a fixer in Lingyun.
- Taffy: A gig worker and the only other ACD Agent at the start, who seeks to use social media to help The Captain restore the ACD to its former glory.
- Richie: A police officer from the NCCA.
- Wei Yinglong: Manager of the temple and village of Longqi on the outskirts of Lingyun.
- Seymour: A master hacker who lives in a RV in Nova City.

== Development and release ==
Ananta is an open-world role-playing game developed by Naked Rain, a studio under Hangzhou NetEase Thunderfire Technology Co., Ltd., with members from NetEase's branch in Montreal distributing the game. The game was officially first announced at Gamescom on August 24, 2023, as Project Mugen, and released its first promotional video. In November 2024, the game was renamed Ananta, meaning 'without end' in Sanskrit. It will be released on January 15, 2027.

The game is being developed for PC, PlayStation 5, Android, and iOS. It is being developed to features languages in Mandarin Chinese, English, and Japanese. The developer intends to add more languages and localization options. Window or monetization plan has not been planned yet, as the developers are focused on game design and content creation.

On November 29, 2024, Project Mugen was titled Ananta. The game was approved for release in China.

In 2025, it was confirmed that the game will not use gacha system for characters. This means players will be able to obtain characters by progressing throughout the game. Monetizable elements exist for "customizable aspects" such as outfits, vehicles, and homes; however, it is unknown if a gacha system is used for these features.

On August 25, 2026, during Gamescom Opening Night Live, NetEase Games announced that Ananta would release on January 15, 2027, for PC, PlayStation 5, iOS, and Android. On the same day, pre-registration opened on Google Play and the App Store, along with pre-order pages on Steam and the PS Store.

== See also ==
- Duet Night Abyss
- Neverness to Everness
- Zenless Zone Zero
