= Duet Night Abyss =

2025 video game

- Developer: Pan Studio
- Publisher: Hero Games
- Engine: Unreal Engine 4
- Platforms: iOS; Android; Microsoft Windows
- Release: 28 October 2025
- Genre: Action role-playing
- Modes: Single-player, Multiplayer

Duet Night Abyss (Chinese: 二重螺旋; pinyin: Èrchóng Luóxuán; lit. 'Double Helix') is a 2025 free-to-play action role-playing game developed by Pan Studio and published by Hero Games. The game supports switching between melee and ranged combat while employing a dual-protagonist narrative structure.

Set on Atlasia, a continent where magic and machinery coexist, as the gameplay setting. Players experience the story through two protagonists from different social backgrounds, interacting with rival factions and engaging in exploration and combat within the in-game world.

The developer removed partial gacha and the stamina systems based on feedback from two closed beta tests prior to the game's release. The game was released on 28 October 2025.

== Plot ==
Duet Night Abyss takes place in Atlasia, a fantasy land where magic and machinery coexist. Players take on the role of the "Phoxhunter", whose name (Vita by default) and gender are chosen at the start of the game. When the Empire invades their home of Purgatorio Island to capture their friend Berenica, the Phoxhunter is separated trying to save her, and ends up drifting into the land of Icelake. Along the way, players encounter "Demons of a Hundred Faces" and work to uncover the truth.

== Gameplay ==
The game is an action role-playing game featuring open world elements, (Note: The game is often described as a game featuring open world elements. One source classify it as an open world game, while other sources label it a semi-open world game, and a "box garden" game.) allowing players to control multiple characters and experience the story from different perspectives. Throughout gameplay, each character can equip melee and ranged weapons, swiftly switching between close-quarters and long-range attacks during combat. Additionally, players can select characters as AI companions to assist in battle, and join other players in co-op multiplayer. The player can control their character and perform basic movements like jumping, while a traversal move called "Helix Leap" enables rapid movement across distances.

Characters and weapons can be equipped with "Demon Wedges". These items provide statistical bonuses and can modify combat mechanics, such as altering a weapon's moveset. Usage is limited by a "Tolerance" capacity system; however, players can reduce the Tolerance cost of a wedge by matching it to a specific "Track" type on the equipment slot. Wedges are acquired through "Noctoyager Manual" commissions, crafting, or the "Spindle of Fate" shop, and can be upgraded as well. Gold Wedges can be upgraded further compared to lower tiers through "Amplification" which involves combining duplicate items.

Unlike other open-world RPGs, characters are not obtained from a randomized gacha system. Instead, they are unlocked and upgraded by collecting character fragments, known in game as "Thoughts". These, although rare, are primarily obtained as rewards from certain commissions that consume "Secret Letters", which are purchased with "Secret Letter Clues", a currency that is obtainable through standard gameplay.

== Development and release ==
Duet Night Abyss was first announced in 2023 by Pan Studio, a studio under Hero Games. Following its initial announcement, the game garnered over 1 million pre-registrations across all platforms and received official approval from the National Press and Publication Administration in 2024.

In February 2025, the game held its first closed beta test. A second closed beta test ran from 12 June to 2 July in the same year.

On 26 August 2025, the developer announced the release date and confirmed the removal of character and weapon gacha and the stamina systems, with monetization shifting to and therefore focusing on cosmetic purchases.

The game was released on 28 October 2025, for Android, iOS, and PC through its own launcher and the Epic Games Store. The Steam version of Duet Night Abyss was planned for release on 23 December 2025, but has been delayed.

The March 18th update for the game triggered a cybersecurity incident where it infected PCs with a malware trojan. While the issue got resolved within a couple of hours, the developers apologized and put up a note, with the exact sequence of events that led to this.

The game received revenue of $1.6 million in its first full month - $1 million from Android platforms and $600k from iOS ecosystem; and all this relying on a cosmetics-only monetization, without paywalling characters or weapons like in classic gacha games.

== See also ==
- Ananta, a similar upcoming open world RPG set in an urban fantasy environment with no gacha system
- Warframe, a free-to-play game with similar gameplay mechanics and structure, but different setting and art style
