= Eggy Party =

- English logo as of mid-2024
- Developer: NetEase
- Producer: kwan
- Platforms: Android, iOS, Nintendo Switch
- Release: Mobile: CN: May 27, 2022; PHI: April 21, 2023; TW: June 30, 2023; SEA: September 8, 2023; WW: February 23, 2024; JP/KR: July 19, 2024; Nintendo Switch: JP: November 15, 2024
- Genres: Battle royale; platform; party
- Modes: Single player, multiplayer

Eggy Party (Chinese: 蛋仔派对; pinyin: Dànzǎi Pàiduì) is a casual video game developed by NetEase. It was released for Android and iOS platforms on May 27, 2022, with a release for Nintendo Switch in Japan on November 15, 2024. The game was first released in China, before releasing internationally to selected regions. The game includes various forms of competitive party gameplay.

Though the game was developed on a low budget, it was an unexpected success, reaching 30 million daily users, and was the most downloaded game in China at one point in 2023.

The game is based on mechanisms such as parkour, hide and seek, and werewolf killing, and has developed multiple game modes. The game allows players to play online and sets up various interactive props. The game supports uploading user original content, which is widely regarded as one of the core gameplay aspects.

At the game's release, it gained significant attention and received many positive reviews. The game achieved commercial success, with 47.33 million daily active users in December 2022. It has the most daily users among NetEase's games. At the 2023 China Game Innovation Contest (中国游戏创新大赛), it was one of two games to win the Best Innovative Game award, and was nominated for Apple's 2023 iPad Game of the Year award.

== Gameplay ==
Screenshot of the game Eggy Party

Eggy Party is a casual competitive battle royale game. The player is represented as a sphere-shaped character called "Eggy". The game uses parkour as the core gameplay element and features three different party round types: "Survival Party", "Race Party", and "Score Party". Players are scored on survival time or time to reach the finish line. In the "Classic Mode", there are a total of 32 players and four rounds. The first players to reach the end point, enter the next round and the last players are eliminated. Players will receive items to hinder their game progress, thus balancing the gap between players. During the game, players can control the Eggy to perform basic operations such as moving and jumping. Game operations such as throwing are also set up to help teammates or hinder other players. The game is equipped with items such as land mines, bowling balls, and the "Finisher". There are seven independent ranks in the game's "Ranked Party". In addition to the parkour gameplay, game developers have set up gamemodes based on mechanisms such as hide-and-seek and werewolf killing, integrated with the images of the Eggies.

Eggy Party allows the uploading of user-generated content (UGC), which is generally considered to be one of the core aspects of the game. Players use the built-in editor in the game to edit scenes and maps, which are publicly publishable to the game community. Players can search for content created by other players for single player or multiplayer games. Game developer Kwan stated that in early 2023, more than one million maps were uploaded to the game every week.

== Development ==
Eggy Party was developed by NetEase. The company's CEO, Ding Lei, said the project would be in operation for at least ten years. During development, the development team believed that the creation and design of user-generated content should be the focus of the game, and the team's core members have experience in developing such content. Players participated in the development and community building of the game by designing original maps. Game developer Hu Lan believes that this type of map-building function is the key to the game's success, provides strong support for the number of players, enhances the social attributes of the game, and ensures player stickiness. Game developer member Kwan believes that the community creators of the game are significant for the game's development, and the creativity of players as creators will promote community development. NetEase Games held the first "Creator Conference" of Eggy Party in June 2023 and invited its original map creators to participate.

The game project team has made adjustments to the map editor. To enrich the richness of map works, the team continued to add various interactive props during the development process and continued to follow up on such content in subsequent development. The logic-based writing feature of the map editor and the ability to create performances in the gameplay are the focus of development. On this basis, the developer has also designed the function of writing dialogues and performances for non-player characters so that map creation can be used to write and produce stories. The project team is trying to integrate artificial intelligence into the game to reduce repeated operations and promote increased production of user content.

== Release and promotion ==
In July 2021, Eggy Party obtained a version number issued by the Publicity Department of the Chinese Communist Party and was allowed to be released in mainland China. The game began its first closed beta test in February 2021. After four tests, named the "Leading Test," "Good Friends Test," "Opening Test," and "Ultimate Test", it was officially released in mainland China on Android and iOS platforms on May 27, 2022. It was later announced to be launched in Taiwan on June 30 in the next year in conjunction with Envoy Games. The game appeared on NetEase's "520 Conference" on May 20, 2023, and showed the new version of the game's promotional video. In August of the same year, the game cooperated with the Shanghai Communications Administration to use the game's character "Eggy" and the fictional character "Shou Hu Miao" to publish a comic with anti-fraud education as the theme, and carried out anti-fraud education for the social system in the game. This cooperation plan added artificial intelligence components to the game to automatically identify fraud or illegal behavior and actively intercept it.

On May 8, 2023, the game collaborated with the Japanese convenience store brand Lawson and launched related catering products, accessories, figurines, and other products. On May 19 of the same year, the game collaborated with the candy brand Alps and launched candy products based on the game characters.

== Reception ==
=== Reviews and Awards ===
The gaming news website GameLook said that Eggy Party had beautiful character design, strong physical feedback technology, and an aesthetically pleasing art style, and had occupied a part of the market among the "Generation Z" user group. In another commentary article, the website pointed out that the emergence of Eggy Party had supported the development of user-generated content in mainland China's games, promoted the development of related technologies, and provided experience for the research and development of related products. Commentators Guo Su and Yan Jinyan from Game Grape said that the gameplay is popular and has a widespread audience. At the same time, they also praised the game project team's technical accumulation and research and development in the game's physics engine. The two editors reflected on the game's social platform development strategy and believed that such a platform could increase players' interest in the game and produce a unique culture. Yan Jinyan said in another commentary article that NetEase's offline features for map creators were successful, and the game's success depended on the popularity and development of user-generated content. Such activities promote the quality of the game and encourage participants in social activities to gain new friendships.

On July 29, 2023, the game won the "Best Innovative Game Award" at the 3rd China Game Innovation Competition. The jury believed the game promoted much Chinese culture and the development and dissemination of user-generated content. Some media have compared the game with Fall Guys, believing the two modes were similar, especially as both have a map-making function.

=== Popularity ===
Eggy Party received great attention and positive reviews upon its release. In June 2023, the number of daily active users exceeded 30 million. The game was on the iOS platform's free game list for over 40 days and achieved commercial success. The game broke NetEase's record for the highest revenue and the most daily active users in 2023.

Eggy Party is widely prevalent among minors in mainland China. Some minors even use adult ID cards to register and recharge a large amount of money, which also encounters the difficulties with handling refund procedures. On December 8, 2023, the official website of Eggy Party stated that it further upgraded the game anti-addiction system, including full-channel access to the mechanism of activating facial recognition for high-risk groups, setting up a unique customer service entrance for minors to refund on all platforms, and launching a one-click ban on recharge and game functions. As of December 2023, Eggy Party had processed more than 30,000 suspected minor-related refund applications, with a completion rate of 98%. There are also adults over 70 who provide their identity information to their children to complete real-name registration. In April 2024, Eggy Party announced new real-name regulations for users over 70, requiring mandatory facial recognition verification during game registration and login to solve the problem of "relatives bypassing real-name authentication on behalf of minors."
