= NetEase =

Chinese Internet technology company

NetEase, Inc.

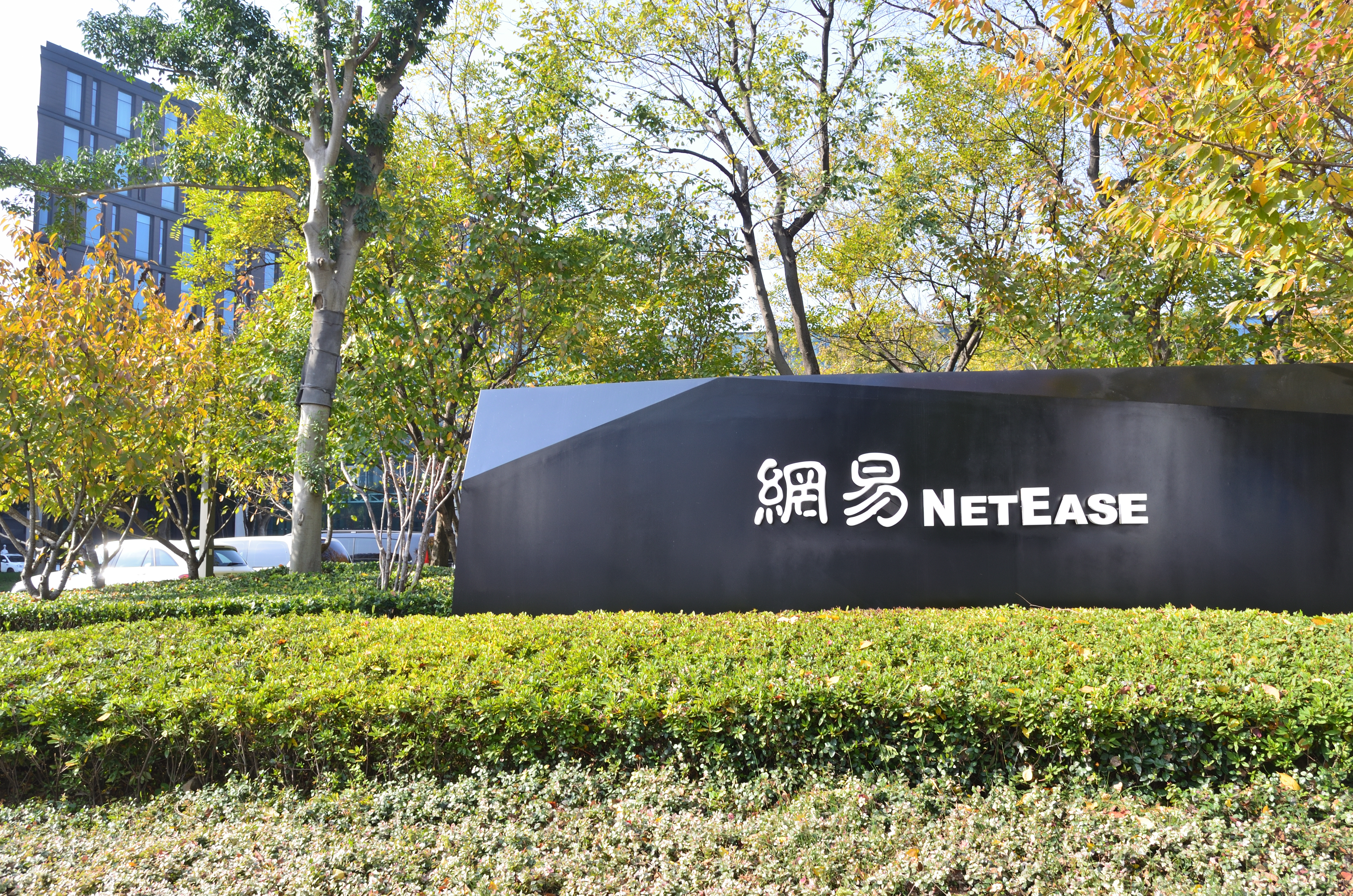
- Headquarters in Hangzhou
- Type: Public
- Traded as: Nasdaq: NTES; SEHK: 9999
- Industry: Internet
- Founded: June 1997; 29 years ago
- Founder: Ding Lei
- Headquarters: Hangzhou, Zhejiang, China
- Key people: Ding Lei (CEO)
- Products: Online services Video games
- Revenue: ▲CN¥112.6 billion (2025)
- Operating income: ▲CN¥35.83 billion
- Net income: ▲CN¥33.75 billion
- Total assets: ▲CN¥180.6 billion
- Number of employees: 25,423 (March 2026)
- Divisions: NetEase YanXuan; NetEase Cloud Music; NetEase Games; NetEase D&R Center Lab; NetEase Wisdom Enterprise; Youdao; NetEase News
- Subsidiaries: See § Game studios under NetEase
- Website: 163.com

NetEase, Inc. (Chinese: 网易) is a Chinese Internet technology company. Its businesses include video games, news aggregation, music streaming, advertising, email, and e-commerce. It was founded by Ding Lei in June 1997.

The company provides online services with content, community, communications, and commerce. It operates a news aggregator website at news.163.com and an associated app. NetEase has an on-demand music-streaming service (NetEase Cloud Music). Video games the company has developed include, Fantasy Westward Journey, Identity V, Eggy Party, Sword of Justice(Justice online), Onmyoji, Tianxia III, Heroes of Tang Dynasty Zero, Ghost II, Marvel Rivals, and Destiny: Rising. It created an Android emulator for PC, called MuMu Player. The company also owns multiple pig farms. In 2023, the company revenue was US$14.6 billion.

== History ==
Ding Lei founded the company in China in June 1997 with just three employees. It sold e-mail servers to internet access providers before developing its own websites that focused on bilingual e-mail and chat rooms, such as the popular 163 email domain. It introduced China's first free e-mail service, first online community, and first personalized information service. After two funding rounds, the company raised nearly $20 million by the end of 1999.

In 1999, NetEase hosted an online literature contest refereed by Wang Meng, Liu Xinwu, and Mo Yan, which contributed to the early growth of internet literature in China.

On July 1, 2000, the company was floated on the American stock market with an initial public offering on Nasdaq. 4.5 million shares were issued at $15.5 per share. The IPO was underwritten by Merrill. During this time, China had made it difficult for Chinese internet companies to reach the Western market. Western investors also remained hesitant to invest in Chinese tech companies. This caused the IPO to be delayed several months and the stock initially underperformed.

Several top executives left the company in June 2001 when it was discovered its sales data may have been misreported. This took place while NetEase was in the midst of buy-out talks with i-Cable Communications. Takeover talks ended soon after. By 2003, Netease had received investments from Softbank, ING Baring, Goldman Sachs, Techpacific.com, and News Corporation. It had 1.7 million registered users on its email service and generated over four million page views each day. It hired 200 people in Beijing, Guangzhou, and Shanghai.

NetEase
- Traditional Chinese: 網易
- Simplified Chinese: 网易
Transcriptions
Standard Mandarin
- Hanyu Pinyin: wǎng yì
- Bopomofo: ㄨㄤˇ ㄧˋ
- Wade–Giles: Wang³-i⁴
- Tongyong Pinyin: Wǎngyì
Yue: Cantonese
- Jyutping: mong5 ji6
Southern Min
- Hokkien POJ: bāng-ia̍h

In August 2005, NetEase announced it would shut down its MP3 service due to the proliferation of pirating. Its blog service was launched in September 2006. In December 2007, the company officially launched its own search engine, Youdao, to replace its partnership with Google since 2000. It went on to develop a series of applications under the brand, including a shopping assistant, Youdao dictionary, and more. NetEase was China's second most popular Google search term that year, behind rival Sina. NetEase's official website address is 163.com. It was attributed to the past when Chinese internet users had to dial "163" to access the Internet, before the availability of broadband.

In January 2011, the company announced the launch of a new online luxury goods shopping platform, L.163.com. Said platform was later shut down in December of that year. NetEase launched Lofter, an online forum for various internet subcultures, in August 2011. It has gone on to be one of the most popular platforms for fan fiction in China. In 2018, NetEase Blog was shut down, with users instructed to transfer their content to Lofter. In March 2012, the official name of the company was changed from NetEase.com, Inc to NetEase, Inc. In April, the company began testing a restaurant recommendation mobile app called "Fan Fan". In October 2013, Coursera announced a partnership with NetEase to launch Coursera Zone, a Chinese-language web portal. NetEase launched an online course platform with educational content in 2014.

Tencent sued NetEase alleging copyright infringement in 2014. It used the leverage from the suit to convince the company to sublicense music rights. The resulting sublicensing arrangement became a model used by other online music platforms in China. In 2015, the company launched Yanxuan, an e-commerce platform. In January 2015, NetEase announced the launch of Kaola.com, a cross-border e-commerce platform that focused on selling goods from overseas merchants, to compete directly with Alibaba and JD.com. By 2016, its shares had increased by 200% over the previous three years. By 2017, NetEase was the largest provider of free e-mail services in China, with over 940 million users since 2017. The company also ran 188.com and 126.com. In 2019, the company sold off Kaola.com to Alibaba for $2 billion.

NetEase carried out a secondary listings on the Hong Kong Exchanges and Clearing in June 2020. In August 2020, NetEase announced a capital and business alliance with anime studio Satelight. In November 2022, the company announced it had invested in Norwegian fitness startup PlayPulse. In March 2023, NetEase launched the Anici anime brand, making a variety of animation for various partners.

=== NetEase Games ===
In 2001, the company formed NetEase Games to focus on gaming. In December, the company launched its proprietary MMORPG Westward Journey Online . It reached 22 million users, with an average of over 400,000 concurrent players, by 2006. In 2008, it started a partnership with Blizzard Entertainment to publish the studio's games in China.

In 2013, the company licensed Hearthstone, Blizzard's free-to-play online strategy card game. In an effort to bring its games to English speaking audiences, NetEase opened its first U.S. office, in the San Francisco Bay Area, in February 2015. In March, a mobile version of Fantasy Westward Journey was released. Within two hours, it reached the number one spot on the top free games chart. The game hit 60 million registered users, with a concurrent user peak of over two million in the first year. It also licensed Cookie Jam and F1 Race Stars. In May, NetEase announced an investment in Helsinki-based developer Reforged Studios. In June, the company also announced a licensing agreement with Blizzard to publish the video game Overwatch.

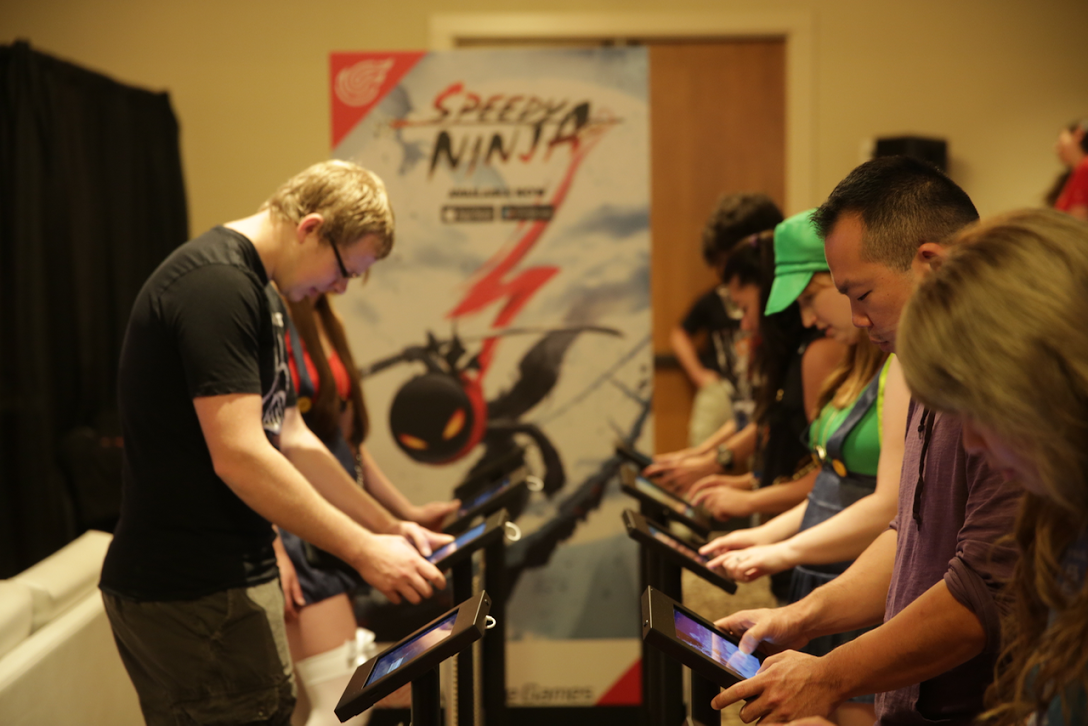
Gamers trying the new release of Speedy Ninja at PAX 2015

By 2016, the company had a portfolio of over ninety mobile games, with forty one more in development. In May 2016, NetEase announced a new partnership with Microsoft and Mojang Studios to bring Minecraft to Asia. Free to play versions for PC, iOS, and Android launched in August, September, and October of the following year. In October 2017, the game had nearly 30 million players. By May 2018, NetEase had over 100 million users. Since 2018, NetEase announced a new partnership with Konami to bring the mobile version of Pro Evolution Soccer series (later replaced by eFootball since 2022) to China.

The company partnered with Mattel in January 2018 to launch a new game developer named Mattel163. It invested US$100 million in Bungie for a minority stake in the company and a seat on the board of directors in June 2018. NetEase took over publishing duties of EVE Online in China, starting in August 2018. That November, Blizzard announced Diablo Immortal, a mobile RPG that would be co-developed by NetEase. The game was also confirmed for PC and released in June 2022. It did not release in China until the following month.

Former Capcom employee Ryosuke Yoshida opened Ouka Studios in June 2020. In August, NetEase teamed with CCP Games to release EVE Echoes, a mobile version of EVE Online. NetEase, The Pokémon Company, and Game Freak, made an expanded version of Pokémon Quest called Pokémon Adventure, released in China on 13 May 2021. It contains regular updates and events unlike other versions. It invested in Japanese developer Grounding Inc. in September 2021. NetEase acquired Grasshopper Manufacture from GungHo Online Entertainment in October 2021. When indie publisher Devolver Digital went public on the London Stock Exchange in November 2021, NetEase purchased an 8% stake in the company. Toshihiro Nagoshi, Daisuke Sato, and several former Sega employees established Nagoshi Studio in January 2022.

After a 14-year partnership, Blizzard Activision ended its licensing agreement with NetEase in November 2022. As a result, World of Warcraft, Hearthstone, Warcraft III: Reforged, Overwatch, StarCraft, Diablo III, and Heroes of the Storm were shut down in China on January 23, 2023. It took a year and a half before a new agreement could be reached in April 2024. The two companies also agreed to distribute NetEase titles on Xbox platforms.

In November 2022, it acquired a stake in Liquid Swords, founded by Just Cause game director Christofer Sundberg in 2020. In May 2022, Jack Emmert founded Jackalope Games in Austin, Texas. It was rebranded as Jackalyptic Games on May 18, 2023, and entered into a partnership with Games Workshop. In July 2022, NetEase teamed with former Halo Studios employee Jerry Hook to establish Jar Of Sparks and also invested in Polish VR studio Something Random. It acquired Quantic Dream in August, following a 2019 minority investment. Something Wicked Games founder Jeff Gardiner also announced that NetEase had invested $13.2 million for the studio. Former Capcom producer Hiroyuki Kobayashi, established GPTRACK50 in October 2022. In November 2022, NetEase made a strategic investment in Rebel Wolves, founded by former CD Projekt employee Konrad Tomaszkiewicz. Riot Games sued NetEase over alleged copyright violation concerning Valorant in 2022.

NetEase acquired the studio SkyBox Labs in January 2023. In February, NetEase opened the studio Spliced. Former Marvelous vice president Toshinori Aoki and BlazBlue game creator Toshimichi Mori opened Studio Flare, with funding from NetEase. It launched Anchor Point Studios in April, under Control game designer Paul Ehreth. Former Ubisoft employee Sean Crooks opened Bad Brain Game Studios and Dragon Quest producer Ryutaro Ichimura established PinCool in May 2023. In August, NetEase established T-Minus Zero Entertainment, founded by Bethesda and BioWare veterans. Former Blizzard employee Greg Street established Fantastic Pixel Castle in November 2023. Mac Walters also established Worlds Untold. David Vonderhaar opened BulletFarm in February 2024.

In March, NetEase and Marvel Games announced Marvel Rivals, a team-based PVP shooter featuring characters from Marvel Comics. The game was released in December 2024 on Windows platforms, PlayStation 5, and Xbox Series X and Series S. It saw 10 million registered users within the first three days and reached 40 million players by February 2025, proving to be a major success for the publisher. In October 2024, it was announced that NetEase was developing and publishing Destiny: Rising, a free-to-play RPG shooter on mobile, in partnership with Bungie. It was released in August 2025.

Since 2024, NetEase has been looking to divest foreign investments due to changes in the video game industry. In order to create a smaller and tighter portfolio to better compete with the likes of Tencent and MiHoYo's Genshin Impact, funding to over a dozen studios were cut. Many studios were shut down, a majority of them having been acquired only five years prior. Ouka Studios was shut down in August 2024, following the release of Visions of Mana. Worlds Untold paused its operation in November 2024.

Jar of Sparks was shut down in January 2025. NetEase shut down T-Minus Zero in August before selling it in September. It shut down Fantastic Pixel Castle and Bad Brain Game Studios in November. NetEase also ended its partnership with Jackalyptic Games, which had been working on an unannounced MMO based on the Warhammer table top wargame. PinCool's debut game Pritto Prisoner was published by Initiate Games in December 2025.

Although NetEase published the 2024 remaster of Shadows of the Damned and is the copyright holder for Romeo Is a Dead Man, Grasshopper Manufacture entered negotiations with multiple publishers before settling on self-publishing its latest title, while GPTRACK50 partnered with SEGA to publish the game, Stupid Never Dies. A NetEase spokesman confirmed that Nagoshi Studio would no longer receive funding starting May 2026 and Gang of Dragon would still require an additional $44 million to be completed. Liquid Swords has produced the game Samson: A Tyndalston Story.

In 2026, Mattel acquired full ownership of Mattel163 from NetEase for $159 million.

=== Music streaming ===
In April 2013, NetEase launched a music streaming service called NetEase Cloud Music. In 2017, it received enough funding to be valued at over $1 billion, receiving unicorn status. In December 2017, NetEase signed a licensing agreement with Kobalt Music Group, gaining access to over 600,000 songs in its catalog.

While rival Tencent held licensing deals with the big three record labels, NetEase focused on independent artists. By 2018, over 70,000 independent artists had uploaded over 1.2 million songs to the platform. In November 2018, NetEase signed a non-exclusive partnership with indie label Merlin Network. in September 2019, Alibaba announced it had invested $700 million to gain a minority stake in NetEase Cloud Music. The service surpassed 800 million registered users by the end of 2019 a 200 million increase from the year before.

In 2020, NetEase entered into licensing agreements with Warner Chappell Music and Universal Music Group, giving users access to the publishers' catalog. In May 2021, NetEase entered into a direct digital distribution relationship with Sony Music Entertainment. NetEase spun off its music streaming business as a separate company in August, listing it on the Hong Kong Stock Exchange.

=== NetEase Comics ===
In 2015, the company launched NetEase Comics to focus on the comic book business. In 2017, NetEase signed a collaboration deal with Marvel Comics to publish comics in China and create Chinese superheroes, including Swordmaster and Aero. By 2018, its online platform had published more than 2,000 comic book series and 40 million registered users. However, at the end of the year, NetEase sold its comics business to Bilibili while retaining the copyright to its Marvel series.

=== Chinese government regulation ===
In October 2020, the Cyberspace Administration of China ordered NetEase to undergo "rectification" and temporarily suspend certain comment functions, after censors found inappropriate comments on the news app.

== Game studios under NetEase ==
Studio	Location
NetEase Games (Interactive Entertainment)	Shanghai, Guangzhou, and Hangzhou, China
NetEase Games (Thunder Fire Studio)	Shanghai, Guangzhou, and Hangzhou, China
NetEase Games Europe	Leamington Spa, England, United Kingdom
NetEase Games Korea	Seongnam, South Korea
NetEase Games North America	Pasadena, California, United States
NetEase Games Tokyo	Tokyo, Japan
Quantic Dream	Paris, France and Montreal, Canada
SkyBox Labs	Burnaby, British Columbia, Canada
Spliced	Manchester, United Kingdom
Starry Studio	Shanghai, Guangzhou, and Hangzhou, China
Everstone Studio	Hangzhou, China

=== Studios under Thunder Fire Studio ===
Studio	Location
Zhurong Studio	Hangzhou, China
24 Entertainment	Hangzhou, China (Binjiang and Lin'an Districts)
Naked Rain	Hangzhou, China (Binjiang and Lin'an Districts)
Bad Guitar Studio	China
Universe X Studio	China
Highdive (formerly NetEase Games Montreal)	Montreal, Quebec, Canada

=== Studios under Interactive Entertainment ===
Studio	Location
Fantasy Studio Group	Hangzhou, China
Joker Studio	Guangzhou, China

=== Former studios ===
Studio	Location	Status
Ouka Studios	Tokyo, Japan	Closed
Nagoshi Studio	Tokyo, Japan	Closed
PinCool	Tokyo, Japan	Sold to Initiate Games
Grasshopper Manufacture	Tokyo, Japan	Management buyout
GPTRACK50	Osaka, Japan	Management buyout
Fantastic Pixel Castle	Remote	Closed
Bad Brain Game Studios	Toronto, Ontario, Canada	Closed
Worlds Untold	Vancouver, British Columbia, Canada	Paused Operations
Jar of Sparks	Los Angeles, California, United States	Paused Operations
Jackalyptic Games	Austin, Texas, United States	Paused Operations
T-Minus Zero Entertainment	Austin, Texas, United States	Broke
Anchor Point Studios	Seattle, Washington, United States and Barcelona, Spain	Management buyout
BulletFarm	Los Angeles, California, United States	Backed by Greater Than Group

=== Strategic investments ===
Studio	Location	Status
Something Wicked Games	Remote	Funded $13.2 million.
Studio Flare	Tokyo, Japan	Unknown
Rebel Wolves	Warsaw, Poland	Acquired minority stake.
Liquid Swords	Stockholm, Sweden	Acquired minority stake.
Devolver Digital	Austin, Texas, United States	Acquired 8% during IPO.

== Games developed and published by NetEase Games ==
Year	Title	Developer(s)	Publisher(s)	Notes
2001	Fantasy Westward Journey	NetEase Games	NetEase Games	
2002	Westward Journey Online II	NetEase Games	NetEase Games	
2015	Revelation Online	NetEase Games	NetEase Games	
2017	Rules of Survival	NetEase Games	NetEase Games	Discontinued on 27 June 2022
2018	Creative Destruction	NetEase Games	NetEase Games	Discontinued on 27 June 2022
2018	Galactic Frontline	NetEase Games	NetEase Games	Online title, Closed in 2020
2018	Identity V	NetEase Games	NetEase Games	
2018	LifeAfter	NetEase Games	NetEase Games	
2018	Pro Evolution Soccer 2018	PES Productions (Konami)	NetEase Games	Chinese version for Android and iOS only
2018	Justice Online	Zhurong Studio(Thunder Fire)	NetEase Games	
2019	Cyber Hunter	NetEase Games	NetEase Games	Discontinued on 23 July 2024
2019	Sky: Children of the Light	NetEase Games	Thatgamecompany	Published in China only
2019	Marvel Super War	NetEase Games	NetEase Games	Discontinued on 18 June 2024
2019	Super Mecha Champions	NetEase Games	NetEase Games	Discontinued on 20 January 2025
2019	Pro Evolution Soccer 2019	PES Productions (Konami)	NetEase Games	Chinese version for Android and iOS only
2020	Marvel Duel	NetEase Games	NetEase Games	
2020	Bloodstained: Ritual of the Night	ArtPlay	NetEase Games	Android and iOS ports
2020	eFootball PES 2020	PES Productions (Konami)	NetEase Games	Chinese version for Android and iOS only
2021	Ace Racer	NetEase Games	NetEase Games	
2021	Racing Master	Dahua Studios, Codemasters	NetEase Games	
2021	Harry Potter: Magic Awakened	NetEase, Envoy Games	NetEase Games, Portkey Games, Envoy Games	
2021	Naraka: Bladepoint	24 Entertainment	NetEase Games	
2021	Astracraft	NetEase Games	NetEase Games	Discontinued on 21 December 2022
2021	The Lord of the Rings: Rise to War	NetEase Games	Warner Bros. Games	Discontinued on 31 December 2025
2021	eFootball PES 2021 Season Update	PES Productions (Konami)	NetEase Games	Chinese version for Android and iOS only
2022	Dead by Daylight Mobile	Behaviour Interactive, NetEase Games	Behaviour Interactive, NetEase Games	Discontinued on 20 March 2025
2022	Diablo Immortal	NetEase Games, Blizzard Entertainment	Blizzard Entertainment	
2022	Eggy Party	NetEase Games	NetEase Games	
2022	Mission Zero	NetEase Games	NetEase Games	
2022	Hyper Front	NetEase Games, BattleFun Games	NetEase Games	Discontinued on 10 April 2023
2022	Lost Light	NetEase Games	NetEase Games	
2022	eFootball	Konami	NetEase Games	Chinese version for Android and iOS only
2023	Sword of Justice	Zhurong Studio (Thunder Fire)		
2024	Blood Strike	NetEase Games	NetEase Games	Available on iOS, iPadOS, Android, and Windows
2024	Once Human	Starry Studio	Starry Studio, NetEase Games	Available on Android, iOS, and Windows
2024	Marvel Rivals	Fantasy Studio Group	NetEase Games	Available on Windows, PlayStation 4, PlayStation 5, and Xbox Series X/S
2024	Where Winds Meet	Everstone Studio	NetEase Games	Available on Android, iOS, PlayStation 5, and Windows
2025	Rusty Rabbit	Nitroplus	NetEase Games	Available on Windows, PlayStation 5, and Nintendo Switch
2025	FragPunk	Bad Guitar Studio	NetEase Games	Available on Windows, PlayStation 5, and Xbox Series X/S
2025	Destiny: Rising	NetEase Games	NetEase Games	Available on Android and iOS
2025	Marvel Mystic Mayhem	NetEase Games	NetEase Games	Available on Android and iOS
2025	Sword of Justice(global release)	Zhurong Studio(Thunder Fire)	NetEase Games	
2027	Sea of Remnants	NetEase Games	NetEase Games	
2027	Ananta	Naked Rain	NetEase Games	
TBA	Blood Message	24 Entertainment	NetEase Games	
TBA	Tom and Jerry: Chase	NetEase Games	Warner Bros. Games	
TBA	ECC: REDLINE (Project: EXTREME)	NetEase Games	NetEase Games	

=== Licensed online games ===
- Three-year agreement to license Overwatch in PRC
- Agreement to license Minecraft and the pocket edition in China
  - Operated the Chinese third-party Minecraft Hypixel server, which was shut down on 30 June 2020
- Assumed the publishing of Eve Online in the Chinese market in October 2018

=== Game technology ===
NetEase develops two in-house game engines for some video games: Messiah Engine and NeoX.

== Pig farming ==
In 2009, NetEase founder Ding Lei announced his intention to modernize pig farming in China. The company's agricultural affiliate Weiyang set up a pig farm in Anji county, Huzhou, Zhejiang province in 2011. The state of the art facility included tracking sensors, data analysis, soothing music, artificial intelligence, and Wi-Fi. The public could also track the pigs online.

In November 2016, the company held an online auction that sold three of its Jeju Black pigs for a total of $75,000. Since the meat has gone to market, NetEase has sold it on the company's Yanxuan e-commerce platform. Meituan Dianping, Sinovation Ventures, and JD.com invested in the endeavor in 2017. By 2018, the facility was overseeing the rearing and slaughter of 20,000 organic free-range hogs each year.

In October 2017, the company announced that it had established a second farm in Gao'an, Jiangxi. NetEase announced in September 2019 that it would invest 1.5 billion yuan ($211 million) to build a pig farm in Shaoxing.
