= Diablo Immortal =

2022 video game

- Developers: Blizzard Entertainment; NetEase Games
- Publisher: Blizzard Entertainment
- Director: Wyatt Cheng
- Producers: Caleb Arseneaux; Mingxian Wang
- Designer: Matthew Berger
- Programmers: Matt Deegler; Austyn Mahoney
- Artist: Hunter Schulz
- Composers: Ryan Amon; Mikolai Stroinski
- Series: Diablo
- Engine: Messiah Engine
- Platforms: Android; iOS; Windows
- Release: NA/EU: June 2, 2022; CHN: July 25, 2022
- Genres: Action role-playing, massively multiplayer online
- Mode: Multiplayer

Diablo Immortal is a 2022 massively multiplayer online action role-playing game developed by Blizzard Entertainment and NetEase. A mobile game in the Diablo series, it is set between the events of Diablo II and Diablo III. Players control a character of their chosen class: Barbarian, Wizard, Monk, Necromancer, Demon Hunter, Crusader, Blood Knight, Tempest, Druid and Warlock. They must locate and destroy hidden shards of the Worldstone, to prevent Skarn, the Lord of Damnation, from destroying the world of Sanctuary.

Development of Diablo Immortal began with the aim of creating a Diablo game centered around touch controls for those who predominantly played on mobile, but was later expanded to also support game controllers and PC. The game incorporates a free-to-play business model which allows players to unlock content through microtransactions, though almost all content can also be obtained through gameplay without paying.

The announcement of Diablo Immortal at BlizzCon in 2018 was met with a largely negative response from Diablo fans, who had anticipated a game designed for PC. It was released on Android and iOS on June 2, 2022, for countries mainly outside of the Asia-Pacific region, with a beta release for Windows on the same date. The game's Asia-Pacific release was delayed several days before its original date, with most releases taking place on July 8, 2022, and its China launch on July 25, 2022.

Diablo Immortal received mixed reviews, earning praise for its combat, graphics, and successful adaptation of the Diablo experience to mobile platforms. However, critics targeted its story, voice acting, and heavy reliance on microtransactions. In response to its monetization and progression system, it became the lowest user-rated game on Metacritic. Despite the controversy, Immortal achieved the largest launch in the franchise’s history, surpassing ten million downloads and reaching thirty million by the end of July 2022.

== Gameplay ==
=== Core gameplay ===
A Crusader fights an undead enemy in Ashwold Cemetery.

Diablo Immortal is a free-to-play massively multiplayer online (MMO) action role-playing game (ARPG), designed initially for play on mobile devices. It is an online-only game, requiring an internet connection during play. The game also features cross-save functionality, linking the player's progress to their Battle.net account and allowing them to continue across multiple devices.

The fast-paced, arcade-like Immortal has many gameplay similarities to Diablo III (such as destructible environments); however, while it retains the vibrant art style of Diablo III, the game's tone is closer to the more somber style of Diablo II. It features the isometric graphic style common to games in the series.

Many of the game's activities are designed to be small in size (Blizzard advise that dungeons, though similar to those from the prior games, average 10–15 minutes in length, with shorter activities lasting 1–5 minutes), so they can fit with the shorter play sessions common to mobile gaming; however, unlike many games in the free-to-play mobile space, Immortal does not feature an "energy" system to limit the amount of free play time available.

Players can create one or more characters to use within the game. When creating a character, players select one of the game's nine character classes: Barbarian, Wizard, Monk, Necromancer, Demon Hunter, Crusader, Blood Knight, Tempest, or Druid, each with 12 unlockable skills (from which the player chooses five to use concurrently). For example, the Barbarian class's skills include slamming a hammer and turning into a whirlwind, whereas the Wizard's skills include a beam of electricity that boomerangs back to its source, dealing damage twice. "Charms" can also be acquired within the game and equipped to further increase skill effectiveness and change how they function.

Unlike previous games in the series, Immortal features a "Class Change" system, by which players can change the class of an existing character and receive a new set of "appropriate" items without having to reset their progress (although focusing on a specific class may ultimately yield advantages, such as a broader range of available gameplay styles). The class change option has no in-game or microtransaction cost; however players are limited to using it once per week for a given character.

The game is designed primarily for touchscreen devices, with virtual controls that overlay the display: a directional thumbstick and skill buttons. Skills feature auto-aim (generally towards the nearest enemy), but the player can manually aim each skill by holding down its corresponding button. Some skills will also "charge" while their button is held, increasing aspects such as damage and area of effect. Alternatively, players can control the game using a connected gamepad: movement and aiming are controlled with the analogue sticks; attacks, potions, and interactions are controlled by the front-facing buttons; and skills are triggered using the top bumpers & triggers (although these bindings can be changed in the game's settings). When played using a mouse and keyboard, Immortal supports movement using the WASD keys (a first for PC games in the series), allowing for movement with one hand alongside combat-based commands using the mouse.

Unlike previous games in the Diablo series, mana and other class-specific resources have been removed from Immortal, in favor of a cooldown-based system for skills (with typical cooldown times ranging from 8–12 seconds). Performing attacks will also fill the character's "Ultimate meter", which, when filled, allows the use of more powerful attacks, amplifying the perks of the character's basic attack, for a limited time period.

=== Rifts and other activities ===
Outside of the game's primary storyline missions, other activities include random quests which appear during exploration, "bounties" (such as defeating specific enemies or creating specific items), "challenge rifts" (randomly generated, time-limited dungeons with ever-increasing levels of difficulty), and "elder rifts". Elder rifts are similar to challenge rifts, but can be modified using "crests" (available on a daily basis) and "legendary crests" for greater reward, the latter of which guarantee a "legendary" (i.e. top-level) gem upon completion.

The "Helliquary" is a feature which unlocks by player level 45. Players gain the ability to hunt, trap, and then defeat "boss demons" (each with a recommended offense and defence rating) as part of 8-player raids. Defeating these enemies earns players trophies, which they can place within their Helliquary, granting permanent character bonuses. The development team intend for the game to introduce a new boss each month.

In the Legacy of the Horadrim feature, players earn “vessels” as rewards for completing specific in-game achievements. These items can be placed into a shrine located beneath Westmarch to unlock character bonuses. Nearby, a dungeon that refreshes daily can be cleared to obtain resources used to enhance the vessels, further increasing their bonuses.

=== Character progression ===
Through gameplay, characters earn experience points, which allow them to increase their level. As characters increase in level, they become more powerful, earning new skills and increasing the power of existing skills. Each character class has its own system of progression.

Once a player's character has reached the game's level cap (which is 60 at launch, though Blizzard has announced plans to increase this later), they can achieve additional "paragon levels", which can be invested into distinct categories (each with their own talent tree). Blizzard has stated that it plans to add additional paragon trees to the game following its initial release.

Higher paragon levels can also result in players finding items with higher statistics than the base versions.

=== Loot system ===
Inventory management for a Crusader character

Defeated enemies and opened treasure chests drop items ("loot"), and NPCs sell similar items in exchange for the in-game currency of gold. Some loot items are also specific to particular enemies. These items can be equipped via a pop-up button or via the game's inventory screen. Such equipment can also be made more powerful by inserting "gems", and via the game's "rank up" system, which uses materials salvaged from other items to make "rare" and "legendary" level items more effective. Such ranks also be transferred from one item to another, ensuring that resources can be invested in progress even prior to acquiring a specific item. Once a legendary-level gem reaches rank 10, it can be used to "awaken" the item it's inserted into, resulting in improved bonuses and a new appearance (such as flames, or swirls of energy). Players can also use any additional legendary gems in their possession to "resonate" with others, increasing both their bonus and cosmetic effect.

Players can also obtain items that belong to a set from specific locations in the game. Item sets in Immortal occupy the six "secondary" slots (hands, feet, neck, waist, and two rings). Equipping two, four, or six items from the same set yields additional bonuses that grant non-class-specific benefits, such as increased healing or extra damage dealt.

In addition to items which change character statistics, the game also offers purely cosmetic items, which can be equipped to change the appearance of a character without altering gameplay. Some cosmetic items are available for specific factions to unlock for free by raising their "Dominance" statistic to specific levels.

The game features a cross-player “marketplace” where players can buy and sell materials and gems. However, to avoid repeating the controversies surrounding the “auction house” feature in Diablo III, the marketplace does not permit the purchase or trading of equipment items, which must instead be earned through gameplay

=== Multiplayer activities ===
==== MMO features ====
Although all of Immortal's core activities can be completed by a solo player, in the style of other MMO games, players can encounter each other when exploring. They can also form temporary parties of up to four players, or create more permanent "Warbands" of up to 8 players, to play through "dynamic events" together. Warbands can also occupy and explore the "Castle Cyrangar" location together, to earn additional benefits. Some of the high-level in-game dungeons and enemies are designed specifically to be tackled by groups of players cooperatively. These gameplay elements are similar to Blizzard's long-running MMO, World of Warcraft.

The game also provides voice chat features, allowing players to communicate both with other members of their party, and with a broader range of players via "public" channels. Immortal also features clans for bringing together larger groups of players.

Immortal supports cross-platform-play; however, players must be on the same in-game server in order to interact. A player character can be transferred between servers for free on the first occasion, with each subsequent transfer requiring a one-off purchase (and a wait period of 30 days).

==== Player versus player combat ====
In addition to cooperative multiplayer elements, the game also features competitive PVP. For example, some areas of the game feature treasure chests which respawn on a timed basis and can only be opened by the last player left alive in the area. Another PVP feature is "Battleground", an 8 vs. 8 mode, with a player ranking system. The "attackers" are charged with—in order—destroying three "Sacred Guardians", escorting at least one of two "Zealous Idols", and destroying the other team's "Ancient Heart", with a separate time limit for each phase. The "defenders" win if they prevent any of those three tasks from being completed or tally enough opponent kills across all three phases.

==== The "Cycle of Strife" ====
The "Cycle of Strife" is an optional PVP system open to all players who have reached Immortal's "endgame" phase. Each of the game's servers allows up to 300 players within the "Immortals" faction, but an unlimited number of players to opt in as part of the "Shadows" faction. The feature is entirely optional for players; any players who do not opt in during a specific cycle are simply designated "Adventurers" not affiliated with either group.

Shadows players attempt to displace the current Immortal players by changing their clans to "Dark Clans" and participating in the Shadows' activities. Immortals players also have designated activities, distinct from those of the Shadows. For example, Immortal players can participate in "Kion's Ordeal": a 48-player raid, with four groups of 12 players fighting four bosses simultaneously. Loot earned from elder rifts by Kion's Ordeal players is added to a vault, which gets handed out to Immortals players on a weekly basis. Shadows activities include "Raid the Vault", where 4 players attempt to steal from the Immortals' vault (beginning with PVE gameplay, until the Immortals send players to defend the vault).

The "Wall of Honor", which is located in Westmarch for all players to view, details achievements of all Immortal faction leaders and their four lieutenants.

Once the Shadows reach a sufficient level of progression, this will trigger "Rite of Exile" where the Dark Clans battle against each other. Victors from the Rite of Exile proceed to the "Challenge of the Immortal", whereby the top player from the Immortals is transformed into a boss (with powerful skills exclusive to that form), and must battle against the top 30 Shadow players in a 30 vs. 1 format. If the Immortal player defeats all 30 Shadows, the structure of these factions remains unchanged; however, if the Shadows are victorious, all 30 players are resurrected and must battle against each other in a battle royale to determine which Dark Clan becomes the new Immortals faction (with the victorious player becoming the new top Immortal, all other players being returned to "Adventurer" designation), at which point a new cycle begins.

Cycles in the game are expected to last between one and three months.

== Premise ==
Part of the Diablo series, Immortal takes place in the series' world of Sanctuary and is set five years after the events of Diablo II, but prior to Diablo III. Players begin their adventure in the town of Wortham, which is being threatened by cultists and the undead. They learn from recurring Diablo character Deckard Cain that they must locate and destroy shards of the Worldstone across the world of Sanctuary in order to prevent a world-threatening disaster, masterminded by the game's initial antagonist Skarn, the "Lord of Damnation."

This journey continues into areas including the city of Westmarch (which serves as the game's main location for trade and social activities), Ashwold Cemetery, Dark Wood, the Shassar Sea, Mount Zavain (location of the Sanctified Earth Monastery), the Frozen Tundra (populated by Barbarian tribes), and the Stormpoint prison island.

Other aspects of the game's plot focus on conflict between the "Immortals" (a group dedicated to the protection of Sanctuary) and the "Shadows" (a secret group established to test the Immortals) in what is known as the "Cycle of Strife".

== Business model ==
=== Microtransactions ===
The in-game marketplace's currency of "platinum" can be obtained through free gameplay and the selling of materials, or via in-game purchase. Other in-game purchases, such as the "Boon of Plenty", can be used to acquire the in-game currency of "eternal orbs" (a premium in-game currency used to purchase items such as cosmetics and platinum) and "legendary crests" (items used to improve the volume and rarity of rewards gained when completing "rift" dungeons; such as "legendary gems", for improving equipment). The legendary crest system has been classified as a "loot box" process, because of the random nature of their rewards.

As an alternative to microtransactions, players can also earn "Telluric Pearls" through in-game rewards, then use them to craft powerful in-game items.

=== Battle pass system ===
In addition to level-based progressions, the game also features a Battle Pass reward system, which grants experience points, making it a way to speed up character progression. The battle pass is leveled up by completing activities such as bounties, dungeons, and rifts. It is tied to seasons, within which there are both free and paid tiers available, with the paid tier focusing on additional opportunities to earn in-game currencies.

Blizzard confirmed that seasons which encourage players to create a new character each time (as seen in Diablo III) are not planned for Immortal, which will focus instead on the concept of players retaining a single long-term character.

== Development ==
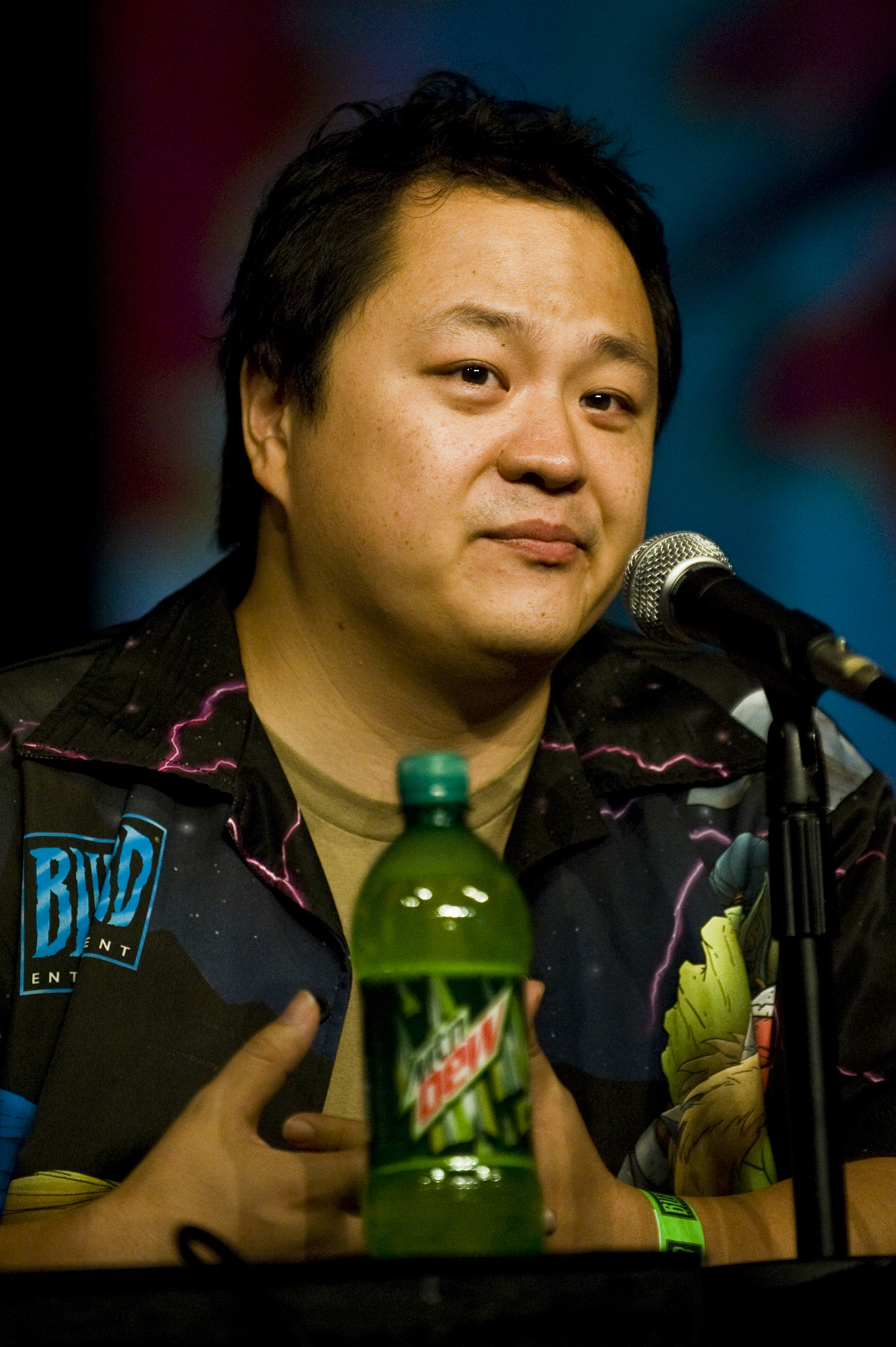
Lead director Wyatt Cheng

=== Initial development ===
Immortal was co-developed by Blizzard Entertainment and NetEase, the latter being Blizzard's partner for Chinese market releases. Blizzard intended to bring the core Diablo experience to the smartphone platform, making interface design choices to best fit that experience to the medium, including gameplay concepts that were unavailable to prior Diablo titles. By designing for a smartphone gaming audience, Immortal was intended to reach demographics and geographic regions that use mobile phones as their primary gaming platform, and therefore may not otherwise interact with Diablo in other formats. The game's director, Wyatt Cheng, and its senior combat designer, Julian Love, both worked previously on Diablo III, and included elements to Immortal which they were not able to include within its predecessor.

The game was first announced during the opening ceremony of BlizzCon in November 2018, where the release platforms were confirmed as Android and iOS, with cross-platform play and progression carry-over between the two. Blizzard announced plans to regularly add new stories and characters after Immortal's initial release. Shortly after the game's announcement, Blizzard began allowing players to pre-register on the game's website for admission to playtest the future beta version.

In February 2019, NetEase's CFO, Yang Zhaoxuan, stated that the game was "pretty much ready" and still planned for a 2019 release; however, he also stated that Blizzard would be the ones to determine the exact release timetable. In November 2019, during BlizzCon, Blizzard posted an update on its official blog, confirming that Immortal was still in development; however, it stated that there was still no specific release date for the game, because "It takes significant time to meet the Blizzard quality level we're aiming for, and we have a lot of ambitious goals for Diablo Immortal." Additional details confirmed in the post included that the game would feature six playable classes (Barbarian, Crusader, Demon Hunter, Monk, Necromancer, and Wizard) and chargeable, class-specific 'ultimate' abilities.

At the start of August 2020, at ChinaJoy, Blizzard and NetEase released a new gameplay trailer for Immortal, showcasing each of the six playable classes, and featuring the first appearance of Baal, one of the main antagonists from Diablo II and its expansion, Lord of Destruction. The trailer also revealed improvements to the game's graphics and character models, which had been implemented since the release of previous promotional material.

=== Public alpha testing ===
A "very limited" public alpha demo of the game took place from December 2020 until January 2021, featuring its first 45 character levels and four of the six playable classes. The alpha was released specifically for players in Australia on Android devices; however, some media outlets were also given access. Character progression from the alpha cannot be carried over into the full game. During a question & answers session at BlizzConline (an online-only version of BlizzCon, due to the COVID-19 pandemic) in February 2021, the development team confirmed that the game's next phase would be an additional alpha, likely featuring the game's full launch level cap (60 levels), additional story elements, and all six playable classes. During this discussion, the team also confirmed that they were working to bring game controller support to Immortal, alongside its on-screen virtual controls, and that they plan to introduce additional classes and locations (all free for every player) after the game's initial release.

In further February 2021 interviews, development team members stated that although they remained focused on mobile platforms, they were "not necessarily going to block" efforts by others to emulate it on other devices. They also confirmed the game to be based on a brand new engine called Messiah Engine, not used for any previous NetEase games, with the same quality standards as other Blizzard-developed games:

"Game development at Blizzard is all about making sure that we ask ourselves the questions, like 'is this good enough?' That's sometimes why it takes a long time for us to make what we make ... [NetEase] completely subscribe to our commitment to quality, which was a pre-requisite to having this partnership ... This is an engine that NetEase is using for the first time. It wasn't [used for] any of those previous games people are comparing it to. It's being built from scratch on a new engine, and it's not a re-skin of Diablo III ... It is a wholly new game that we've built."

The team also revealed how they had made player feedback a core component of the alpha test, implementing a system which allowed them to look at all of the feedback submitted through the in-game feedback tool:

"At the end of our Technical Alpha, we looked at every single piece of feedback we got ... We basically did a summit where we had all the team on a Zoom, and I was sharing my screen, and we just went line-by-line ... In the end, we do have to make a judgment call, but we really do value that kind of feedback, especially when we see clear trends over multiple players. And we're also looking at Reddit and other community channels to get anecdotes and other feedback from there, as well."

An example given of changes made in response to this feedback was how the team had strengthened the wizard class's ice-based attacks, to support ways in which players wanted to use these skills, and address concerns that the class was "underpowered".

In April 2021, Immortal entered a new closed alpha test, also limited specifically to Android players in Australia. The new test featured addition of the game's Crusader class, a raise of the character level cap to 55 (compared to 60 from the full game), and introduction of the "Cycle of Strife" feature (with the alpha lasting "at least a month" to allow sufficient testing of this new gameplay element). At the beginning of this second alpha, the game's director, Wyatt Cheng, confirmed that there would be a minimum of one further testing phase (with the full level cap of 60) before the game's release.

During its first quarter financial earnings release in May 2021, parent company Activision Blizzard confirmed Immortal to be "on track for global release later [in 2021]," although no specific release window for the game was stated; however, in August 2021, Blizzard announced that the game had been delayed until the first half of 2022. The update indicated that the delay was to allow more time for gameplay improvements following alpha testing feedback, such as making the Cycle of Strife feature "more accessible", making the Helliquary and bounties "more engaging", adding controller support, and making alterations to character progression systems.

=== Public beta testing ===
A closed beta version of Immortal launched on October 28, 2021, with an intended duration of "just under three months", solely for Android players in Australia and Canada (expanding in the weeks after to Korea, Japan, and China). This new version of the game added in the Necromancer class (the final of the game's planned launch classes), a new "Hell IV" difficulty level (with improved rewards for higher difficulties), the "Legacy of the Horadrim" feature, and the first iteration of game controller support (a work-in-progress "early test" version of the feature, supporting character movement and combat via a limited range of controllers, but requiring players to navigate menus using the touchscreen). Additional gameplay systems added in the beta included "awakening" and "resonance" for legendary gems, and item sets.

The beta also added a player ranking system and corresponding rewards to the 8 vs. 8 "Battlegrounds" mode, and significantly changed the end of the "Cycle of Strife", shifting it from a series of 8 vs. 8 battles (featuring the strongest eight members of the top ten Dark Houses against the best players within the Immortals) to a new system called "Challenge of the Immortal": a 30 vs. 1 battle centred around the top Immortal player. The structure of the "Helliquary" feature was also changed: these enemies, which could previously be defeated by solo players, were changed to 8-player raid events, with a strong focus on teamwork.

In-game purchases were made available for the first time during the beta. Although any purchases made during the beta will not carry over to the full version, players making purchases during the beta were to receive equal credits back to their account once the testing period completes.

In February 2022 (following completion of the beta in January), game director Wyatt Cheng and senior system designer Kris Zierhut posted on the game's official website stating that they would be making multiple additional changes based on player feedback. These changes included shifting bounties to single-player experiences (to avoid players feeling like groups were forced together), balancing the difficulty of "Helliquary" raid bosses, refining controller support, finalizing the "Paragon" system (to prevent players progressing too quickly ahead of others), and re-evaluating the "Boon of Plenty" micro-transaction to increase its value. Further changes were also announced for the Cycle of Strife (with additional changes to be announced later), including the consolidation of clans and "Dark Houses" into a single entity (describing the existence of separate, temporary social groups a "a jarring upheaval to your social system and network of players"). The post reiterated a target launch for the game at some stage in 2022.

== Release ==
On March 28, 2022, Blizzard commenced iOS pre-orders for Immortal (to match Android pre-registrations, which had already gone live), with a new trailer showcasing exclusive in-game "Horadrim" cosmetics that would be made available to all players (provided that they complete the tutorial within 30 days of launch) if the game reached 30 million pre-registrations before release. The corresponding App Store listing for the game specified a release date of June 30, 2022; however, later the same day, Blizzard clarified that this was only a placeholder date while they "lock in" plans for the game's release. During this time period, Blizzard also revealed that the game would allow players to change the class of an existing character without losing their prior progress.

On April 25, 2022, Blizzard shared a new trailer for Immortal, announcing its release date of June 2, 2022. As part of this announcement, they also unveiled that an open beta for Windows versions of the game would begin on the same date (with all of the mobile version's content and features, plus all progress and purchases carrying over to the full version). It was confirmed that full cross-play and cross-save support would exist across these platforms. Blizzard also released a statement regarding their decision to release the game on PC, despite previously stating it would be mobile exclusive:

"On one hand, we felt that we wouldn't be doing the title justice by releasing a game originally designed for mobile on PC, on the other hand, we wanted to make sure the game reached as many players as possible – especially our most dedicated PC fans. The deciding factor was that we knew many of you would attempt to play this game through an emulator, thus leading us towards building a better experience."

In an interview with GameSpot, the game's senior designer, Scott Burgess, added that they had taken "so long" to announce the game's PC version because they "wanted to make sure the polish of the game was at a point where we were happy with it and happy to release it simultaneously with the mobile launch."

The release version of the game was expanded to include support for a number of additional controllers compared with its beta versions, including the PlayStation 5's DualSense, the Rotor Riot, and the SteelSeries Nimbus.

PC pre-loading for the game began on May 26, 2022, alongside Blizzard's "roadmap to hell," detailing the game's rollout schedule. This included confirmation that although it would launch on June 2 for most regions, Immortal would launch on June 23 for countries in the Asia Pacific region such as Hong Kong, Indonesia, Singapore, and Thailand, and that it would only be available on PC for players in Vietnam. It was also confirmed that it would launch with native voice chat transcription and speech-to-text accessibility options. In the following days, it was revealed that the game would not be launching in Belgium and the Netherlands, due to "current operating environment for games in those countries," specifically their tighter laws regarding loot boxes.

Blizzard supplied reviewers for the game with Razer Kishi controllers, which attach to smartphones to provide a hardware experience similar to handheld gaming consoles such as the Nintendo Switch or Steam Deck. In an interview with The Washington Post, game director Wyatt Cheng said that he believed "...'Diablo Immortal' is going to change a lot of people's minds on what they think of as a mobile game. That was one of our goals since the beginning. Let's elevate the standards for what people can expect from a mobile game."

As previously indicated by Blizzard, The mobile version of the game became available for some markets a day ahead of the official June 2 release date.

In September 2022, the game received an official tie-in promotion with Burger King in Japan. This promotion featured a limited-time spicy garlic cheeseburger and a giveaway of three t-shirts with a chibi-style cartoon of in-game enemy "The Butcher" (drawn by manga artist Bkub Okawa).

=== Asia-Pacific release delays ===
On June 15, 2022, Immortal's official account on Chinese social media website Weibo was reportedly banned from the service for "violating relevant laws and regulations," with publications speculating that this was due to an alleged, since-deleted post from the account making reference to Winnie the Pooh (a popular method for criticizing Chinese leader, Xi Jinping). Four days later, it was announced that the game's release in Asia-Pacific markets (originally scheduled for June 23, 2022) would be delayed for developers to "[make] a number of optimization adjustments," including "support for a wider range of models and devices ... experience, network and performance optimisations, and more."

Following the delay, NetEase promised players an "exclusive thank-you package containing legendary equipment" as an apology, and provided an updated release window of July 8 for impacted markets such as Hong Kong, Indonesia, Macao, Malaysia, the Philippines, Singapore, Taiwan, and Thailand; however, no new release date for China (which had received over 15 million pre-registrations) was confirmed at the time. NetEase's share price fell significantly in the days following these events.

The following month, NetEase confirmed the game's updated China release date of July 25, 2022. Sources cited by Bloomberg indicated that this date was still "subject to last-minute changes"; however, the release went ahead as planned. Due to the ongoing ban of the game's Weibo account, NetEase did not make any social media announcement for the updated launch date (though did set up pre-launch marketing pages on the App Store and TapTap online game stores). On the first two days of release, Immortal was first place in the country's iOS video game downloads, with some players on popular regional servers experienced queues of over 5,000 people.

=== Post-release updates ===
Following a "Season 2" update on July 7, 2022 (focused on a new Battle Pass, and new Helliquary boss, and new cosmetic items), Immortal's first new feature was added on July 20, granting player's access to the "Class Change" feature, swapping their character's class for free, without losing their prior progress.

In mid-August 2022, additional game modes were added in the form of limited-time events, including the "Fractured Plane" (a roguelike mode where players enter a 15-floor dungeon, starting with a basic set of skills and equipment, then salvaging better items or purchasing them using looted "shadow coins") and the "Echo of the Immortal" (a PVP mode allowing non-Immortal players to play a match similar to "Challenge of the Immortal").

Immortal's first "major" update was released in late September 2022. This "Forgotten Nightmares" update introduced a new dungeon and a new system for warband groups to occupy and explore a new location called "Castle Cyrangar." In the following month, Blizzard also added a means for players to earn "Telluric Pearls:" a new resource for crafting 5-star legendary gems without making in-game purchases.

In response to one of the game's "top requested changes from our community", the ability to transfer characters between in-game servers was added in October 2022, alongside the announcement that the game would be merging servers to achieve higher player counts in each (such as the 12 servers in each North American data center being merged into four groups of three).

The first additional in-game location for Immortal, the "salt-scrubbed prison island" of Stormpoint, was announced during a developer Q&A post, which confirmed that it would "expand the story of Diablo Immortal and introduce a new questline," whilst also featuring "more farming opportunities, bounties, and unique zone-wide events." The new location was released on December 14, 2022, as part of the game's second "major content update," named "Terror's Tide." This update also introduced the option for players to re-customize the appearance of their characters, plus additional "Hell" difficulty levels (tied more closely to Paragon and Helliquary progression systems).

The game's first new class (also first for the series overall since Diablo III's Crusader in 2014), the Blood Knight, was revealed in early July 2023. Described as a "vanquisher of vampires" and "a mid-range class ... specializing in the polearm weapon type," the Blood Knight was based upon characters established in lore from the original Diablo. This was followed by a second original class for the series, the Tempest (a "Water-Bending Warrior-Priest"), which was announced on May 7, 2024 and released on May 23. Additionally, this update significantly overworked the difficulty and paragon systems, with an aim to giving more "mix and match" options for skills.

Immortal's first conflict with the series' title villain, Diablo, was added to the game on December 12, 2024, as part of the 'Shattered Sanctuary' update, which GameSpot described as "not only ... the game's largest new zone to date, but also its biggest boss battle yet." This battle served as a culmination of the game's core story elements since its original launch. Lead content designer Scott Burges described how the update expanded on the scale of conflict previously present in the game:

"One thing we really wanted to do was bring back the nostalgia, and the monstrous size of Diablo, like you see in [Diablo 2] ... This Diablo is holding basically a weapon of mass destruction, one of the Worldstone Shards, and this is allowing him to be bigger and more dangerous than ever. He is literally bending reality as he fights you ... This is our biggest fight yet. This is taking what we've done before and making it even bigger."

This update was also accompanied by several updates to the game's graphics, such as improved liquid effects and the addition of ray tracing effects for improved lighting and reflections.

== Reception ==
=== Pre-release ===
Response to Immortal's announcement at BlizzCon 2018 was largely negative. While traditional gaming audiences often express skepticism towards mobile versions of game franchises, the Diablo series community's discontent was compounded by their anticipation for a larger announcement. They expressed their discontent through online channels, likening Immortal to a "reskin" of prior NetEase games, such as Crusaders of Light and Endless of God. Later in the same day, developers participated in a Q&A with attendees. Two particular questions leveled at Wyatt Cheng, Principal Game Designer at Blizzard, drew significant attention from media and audiences alike, with one attendee asking if the announcement was an "out of season April Fools' joke", and another asking if there was a possibility for a PC release, but unfortunately, the answer turned out to be negative news that the game is announced to have no PC release, leading to the crowd of fans booing. After the negative crowd reaction, Cheng rhetorically questioned and chastises the fans by yelling at them "Do you guys not have phones?", which became a meme within the Diablo community.

Blizzard responded to the announcement's reception the following day, stating that Immortal is but one Diablo series game in active development, and pointing to the company's multi-platform development experience and the success of the mobile version of Hearthstone as evidence of their capacity to overcome uncertainty and do right by their core audience. They also addressed a rumor that they had withheld announcement of a main Diablo sequel due to the negative response at Immortal's reveal:

"First off we want to mention that we definitely hear our community. We generally don't comment on rumors or speculation, but we can say that we didn't pull any announcements from BlizzCon this year or have plans for other announcements. We do continue to have different teams working on multiple unannounced Diablo projects, and we look forward to announcing when the time is right."

Following the announcement, Activision Blizzard's stock fell 7% on the first weekday of trading. Later in November 2018, newly appointed Blizzard president, J Allen Brack, thanked fans for their feedback, because it showed their love for the franchise:

"I think it's clear there's a lot of players who are eager for more Diablo PC and console content. That came through loud and clear from BlizzCon. Frankly, we feel fortunate to have a community that cares so much about that franchise. The commitment and the engagement of our community is one of the things that makes Blizzard very special and something that we really appreciate. "We feel that Diablo Immortal is going to deliver a very authentic Diablo experience, and we're not going to compromise on that mission ... Launching the game is only going to be the beginning. There's going to be ongoing support. We're only going to release the game when we feel like it is meeting the community's very high standards. In the end, Diablo Immortal is going to fulfil that, and we think that people are going to experience it, and we think they're going to love it."

Previews based on the game's earliest demos in 2018 included both positive and negative sentiment. Mashable, for example, described the game as "a lot of fun" and praised its visual style compared to Diablo III, while GameSpot and VentureBeat cited its many unknown factors (especially how its business model would work, which Blizzard was unable to confirm at the time) as one of the biggest areas of concern. Some writers expressed approval for its controls, its interface having been tested by prior NetEase games, although Polygon noted difficulties with the precision aiming of abilities, and Kotaku felt it to be "occasionally slow to respond." Multiple writers felt that where Immortal captured the series' look and feel, it omitted some of its core tenets, or as Polygon put it, Diablo's "soul". Although the mobile game captured the basic Diablo experience, the reviewers questioned whether the new entry had enough new content to remain fresh. In these early previews of the game, newly equipped items did not change the visual appearance of the player's character, which also received criticism; however, this feature was added by the time of the game's subsequent alpha demo.

In contrast to those from 2018, previews based on the game's late 2020 alpha featured a higher level of positivity: IGN, described Immortal as offering a "fully fledged new Diablo" experience, and "not a watered down mobile lookalike" (a message reinforced by Eurogamer and The Verge, who described it as "[feeling] like a proper Diablo game"). IGN made specific callout of the fact that, despite Immortal being a free-to-play game, there were no core gameplay elements (such as missions, character progression, or loot items) which required players to spend money. Other areas of praise included the game's combat and art direction (including the look of different equipment items on character models); however, the lack of controller support was identified as a shortcoming. Game Informer's reviewer explicitly stated that the game's new alpha "looks, feels, and plays much closer to a core Diablo title" than the previous demos they had seen; however, they felt that while the game had a number of positives, it made them wish it was available on a non-mobile platform, without virtual touch controls.

Of the game's 2021 beta version, Anthony Nash of Android Central stated that "Diablo Immortal has what it takes to not only deliver an authentic Diablo experience, but to quickly become one of the best Android games available when it launches." Describing it as "a must-play for fans of the series," Nash praised the newly added necromancer class and the improvements to player vs. player modes compared to the prior alpha. Nick Rego of IGN also praised the beta's improvements over the alpha and its similarity to prior Diablo games, but also noted that "it'll only run as good as the phone you're playing it on, and in-game microtransactions may make you feel like you're missing out on some truly great items." Cam Shea of IGN also praised Immortal's controller support, but noted that it was at odds with the game's strength that, by being mobile, "it can fit into your life wherever you want it to." Shea also offered praise for the virtual controls available, describing them as "intuitive and easy to use", despite considering himself "generally not a fan of virtual analogue sticks and virtual buttons."

=== Post-release ===
Reception

Aggregate scores
Aggregator	Score
Metacritic	iOS: 67/100; PC: 59/100
OpenCritic	31% recommend

Review scores
Publication	Score
Destructoid	6/10
Game Informer	8.5/10
GameSpot	6/10
IGN	6/10
Jeuxvideo.com	14/20
PCMag	4/5
TouchArcade	4/5

Diablo Immortal received "mixed or average" reviews according to review aggregator Metacritic. Fellow review aggregator OpenCritic assessed that the game received fair approval, being recommended by 31% of critics. Common areas of praise included the game's "fun" and "satisfying" combat, graphics, user interface, touch controls, and overall presentation; whereas areas of criticism included the plot, leveling system (citing a need for grinding, particularly for free players), and voice acting.

During his review, Cam Shea of IGN said the game "feels great to play, and for the most part it looks pretty good, too", reiterated his being a "big fan" of the game's touch controls, while also praising the game's streamlined inventory system compared with its predecessors. He also supported Blizzard's claim that the game did not require in-game purchases to enjoy, writing "not once, in more than 20 hours, did I hit any kind of unexpected roadblock where it felt like I was expected to make a purchase to more easily push through."

Other publications, however, expressed a higher level of concern with the game's monetization methods. Den of Geek's Matthew Byrd mentioned that when focusing attention on the "core Diablo Immortal experience... you're able to experience without spending a dime," it is "one of the most substantial mobile games ever made" and "features some of the most impressive presentation values you'll ever find in a mobile game;" however, Byrd also opined that the game's microtransactions are "malicious" and "clearly designed to make free-to-play gamers feel inferior". Similarly, Igor Bonifacic of Engadget described Immortal as "Blizzard's best and most worrying game in years" and "a more fitting sequel" to its predecessors than Diablo 3, but also pointed out how "players willing to spend nearly endless amounts of money on the game will be the most powerful", contrasting with the "spirit of the franchise." Maddy Myers of Polygon thought Diablo Immortal proved that "Diablo was made to be a mobile game", but pointed out how microtransactions work "a little too well" with the series formula, writing "[they] do not just feel predatory and manipulative; they feel like the final ingredient that allows an already-addictive series to attain its true form." Tyler Colp of PC Gamer said that in regards to the game's microtransactions, "the red flags are big with this one." A number of others expressed mixed or uncertain feelings regarding the game's business model (especially in comparison with some other free-to-play mobile titles) at their time of writing.

In 2023, the Academy of Interactive Arts & Sciences nominated Diablo Immortal for Mobile Game of the Year at the 26th Annual D.I.C.E. Awards.

Looking back over Diablo Immortal in May 2024, IGN's Destin Legarie described how, although it had "had its ups and downs, just as its big brother Diablo IV", "the team working on Immortal has constantly been adding things that pique my interest" and that he was "impressed with the sheer amount of additions made to it in two years."

==== Audience response ====
Metacritic's user review score for the PC version reached 0.2/10, making it the site's lowest ever user rating for a game. Criticism targeted the use of microtransactions, with players noting it became increasingly harder to progress through the later stages of the game without paying real-world money, and accused it of being "pay-to-win".

In the days following Immortal's release, publications reported on calculations made by YouTuber Bellular News that it would require approximately US$100,000 of real-world money to fully upgrade a character, or approximately 10 years of play without purchases. The required costs were primarily attributed to the game's highest-level legendary gems not being able to be earned by free-to-play players, while the paid process to obtain them was noted by Eurogamer as "randomised and often exceedingly rare". Game Rant and other publications, meanwhile, documented that a Twitch streamer had, in an attempt to highlight the design of the progression system, spent NZ$25,166 ($15,997) in the game before receiving any top-level legendary gems. Other players on services such as Twitter and Reddit later revised these estimates to between US$300,000 and US$600,000, due to the fact that reaching maximum levels of a legendary gem unlocks additional gem slots within items.

Video Games Chronicle reported on the experience of YouTuber Raxxanterax, who noted he had easily lost to a "whale" player, while PCGamesN documented the experience of another YouTuber, Wudijo, who had become powerful enough to survive the toughest battles on their server without spending any money (although they did note that not all members of the victorious clan were free-to-play). Later reports also documented the experience of a player who spent "around $100k" on the game and achieved a battleground record too high for the game's matchmaking system to pair them with any other players, thereby preventing them from playing that game mode. Additional negative sentiment was directed at the discovery of hidden caps for in-game rewards, which the game does not make explicit to players. Such caps include a daily limit on the number of "legendary" level items dropped, and on the number of rewards available from side-quests and random events.

Following the controversy over the game's microtransaction costs, a number of Immortal's most notable live streamers and community figures publicly announced their separation from the game. This included a community Diablo website announcing that they would be closing their Diablo Immortal section and removing all of their previously published guides for it. The website cited the "predatory pay-to-win system", exploiting "gambling addiction" and "unrewarding gameplay" as the key reasons for the decision, concluding that "we cannot in good faith continue to cover this game".

In response to negative sentiment around the game's monetization, Blizzard representatives stated that "the monetization comes in at the end game ... hundreds of millions of people can go through the whole campaign without any costs", cited "high user reviews on the App Store" of the game's success, and informed the LA Times that "50% of players have never played a Diablo game before" and "the vast majority of players aren't spending money".

==== Third-party Eternal Orb sales ====
During the initial months after the game's launch, some third-party reseller websites (often supported by proceeds from stolen credit cards) made it possible for players to purchase reduced-price "Eternal Orbs" outside of the game's built-in process; however, in September 2022 (in response to player requests for action, and due to the associated EULA violations), Blizzard removed any orbs from players which were purchased in this manner. Given that many of these orbs had already been spent by players on in-game items, this reduction often resulted in a negative balance, which multiple publications termed "orb debt." For one top player, this debt amounted to the equivalent of approximately US$34,000 (equivalent to $37,406 in 2025)–US$35,000 (equivalent to $38,506 in 2025). Blizzard released an official statement to accompany this action:

"We have been looking into abnormal Eternal Orb purchases that have been reported among the community, and taken actions to prevent players from purchasing Eternal Orbs through unofficial channels. Investigations have been made for accounts that have participated in these activities, and disciplinary measures were implemented against accounts that were found to have violated the Blizzard End User License Agreement. We will continue to monitor and take actions as needed."

Players with such negative balances became unable to join in-game "parties" and other group activities, such as dungeons and rifts; but (following further player requests), Blizzard took additional action in the subsequent weeks, releasing a game update preventing any player in "orb debt" from participating in player-versus-player activities. This was again accompanied by a public statement from Blizzard, saying that "transactions with unauthorized sellers [create] a risk — not only to [a player's] own account, but to our greater player community."

=== Sales and revenue ===
Within the first week of release, Blizzard announced Diablo Immortal as having the biggest launch in the Diablo franchise's history, having reached over ten million downloads. They later announced that, it had reached over 20 million global installs by July 24, 2022, and over 30 million downloads by July 29, 2022. Activision Blizzard's second-quarter financial results for 2022 (which cited Immortal as the reason for its increase from 22 million monthly users to 27 million) indicated that 50% of Diablo Immortal player accounts to-date were newly registered with Blizzard, suggesting (due to Blizzard's player sign-in requirements) that they had likely not played any prior Diablo game.

According to the AppMagic data tracking service, Immortal generated over US$790,000 within its first 24 hours, and $14.5 million within its first week. This figure had reached $24 million within the game's first two weeks (making it Blizzard's second-highest-earning game, after Hearthstone). As of July 4, 2022, it was reported that the game was grossing in excess of US$1,000,000 per day (with a daily peak of US$2,400,000 ten days after its launch). According to the App Store analytics firm Sensor Tower, the game surpassed US$100,000,000 in revenue within its first eight weeks.
