= Where Winds Meet =

- Developer: Everstone Studio
- Publisher: NetEase Games
- Producer: Beralt Lyu
- Designer: Chris Lyu
- Engine: Messiah Engine
- Platforms: PlayStation 5; Windows; Android; iOS; Xbox Series X/S
- Release: PlayStation 5, Windows; November 14, 2025 (Note: Where Winds Meet was released worldwide on this date. In China, it was launched in open beta several months earlier.); Android, iOS; December 12, 2025; Xbox Series X/S; June 7, 2026
- Genre: Action-adventure role-playing
- Modes: Single-player, multiplayer

Where Winds Meet (Note: Simplified Chinese: 燕云十六声; traditional Chinese: 燕雲十六聲; pinyin: Yànyún Shíliù Shēng.) is a wuxia action-adventure role-playing game developed by Everstone Studio and published by NetEase Games. The player assumes the role of a wanderer in China during the Five Dynasties and Ten Kingdoms period.

Where Winds Meet was released worldwide for PlayStation 5 and Windows on November 14, 2025, for Android and iOS on December 12, 2025, and for Xbox Series X/S on June 7, 2026.

== Gameplay ==
Where Winds Meet is a wuxia action-adventure role-playing game. It can be experienced in single-player and multiplayer modes. It is played from a third-person perspective.

The player assumes the role of a wanderer. This type of hero is also known as a youxia in Chinese traditions. It is also possible to pursue various professions, such as healer and scholar. The player character's appearance, including physical attributes and clothing, is customizable.

This gameplay demonstrates the wanderer performing martial arts, specifically the Nameless Sword, and mystic arts.

The wanderer can wield weapons of several types, namely swords, dual blades, spears, rope darts, fans, umbrellas, mo blades, heng blades, and gauntlets. Each weapon type is associated with different martial arts, which shape the skill set and fighting style. For example, umbrellas can be paired with the Soulshade Umbrella, the Ninefold Umbrella, or the Spring Dreamscape martial arts. Two weapons can be equipped at a time. They are used to perform light attacks, heavy attacks (which may include a charged variant), martial art skills, special skills, and dual-weapon skills (which consist of a weapon switch and attack). Depending on the current build, it offers damage, control, and healing effects. Defensive maneuvers consist of dodges, blocks, and deflects (parries). However, some enemy attacks carry restrictions in the ways defenses can counter them, which are telegraphed by color cues. Specifically, a red glow signals an attack that cannot be blocked, while a golden glow signals an attack that cannot be blocked or deflected.

In addition, the wanderer can perform mystic arts, which comprise skills that have effects inside and outside of combat. They serve offensive, movement, or general purposes. For example, Tai Chi is used to throw a target, gather leaves in certain areas, or create ripples in water that causes fish to leap.

The game takes place in an expansive open world. Players can undertake quests, which are categorized into main story, lost chapter, encounter, and exploration. For instance, the lost chapter quest One Leaf, One Life delves into a mystery about golden leaves and the interconnected stories of several Kaifeng City residents. Players can also participate in player versus player arenas, cooperative dungeons, and many other challenges, as well as numerous casual activities. In-world sects, which provide distinct rules and incentives for their members, can be joined. Player guilds can be formed.

The game supports cross-platform play and progression. It has multiple options for exploration guidance and combat difficulty. It is entirely free-to-play. Its monetization model does not involve pay-to-win elements, but is focused on cosmetic appearances.

== Synopsis ==
=== Setting ===
Where Winds Meet is set in China during the Five Dynasties and Ten Kingdoms period. Its world spans several distinct regions, including Qinghe, Kaifeng, Hexi, the Hidden Mountain, and Qingzhou.

Where Winds Meet draws heavily on wuxia. For example, the game integrates the concept of the jianghu. The "blood and rain" (a reference to the idiom "foul wind and blood rain") of the jianghu is recreated in the player versus player gameplay, according to the producer Beralt Lyu. Additionally, for example, the game explores the concept of xia to reflect on what heroism means. It can be seen as a moral compass that guides an individual's duty to protect the innocent and uphold justice, according to the head of publishing Eric Zheng.

=== Etymology ===
Where Winds Meet is titled Yanyun Shiliu Sheng (Sixteen Sounds of Yanyun) in Chinese. The name Yanyun refers to a historical region encompassing the Sixteen Prefectures, which was lost during the Five Dynasties and Ten Kingdoms period. The term Shiliu Sheng (Sixteen Sounds) alludes to a musical system comprising sixteen tones devised by Wang Pu, a minister of the Later Zhou dynasty. He had been commissioned by Emperor Shizong to write the musical treatise Lüzhun, so he incorporated folk culture and formed the framework. The sounds were thus composed of twelve tones that were classical and four tones that were used among the common people. The developers regarded the term as a metaphor for China's culture. The title was used by the developers to convey the background of the Five Dynasties and Ten Kingdoms period.

The English title Where Winds Meet draws on wind as a symbol of freedom and limitless possibilities. In its plural form, winds represent forces that converge, collide, and merge, such as individuals with diverse thoughts, factions with different philosophies, and free-spirited wanderers on unique paths. The title was used by the developers to present the game's world as a space where this dynamic occurs. Furthermore, closer to the historical context, the developers used the title to express that many individuals and factions unified in the Song dynasty following the turbulent era of the Five Dynasties and Ten Kingdoms.

== Development ==
Where Winds Meet is a game developed by Everstone Studio and published by NetEase Games. Everstone Studio is based in Hangzhou, China. The project was initiated in November 2019. The game utilizes the Messiah Engine.

Everstone Studio set out to create a game that combines wuxia and an open world. The development team aimed to provide a deep immersion in the wuxia genre, a combat system that is different from traditional wuxia titles on the market, and an open world experience rich with emotional peaks. The wuxia immersion and world exploration were closely integrated with each other to enable players to feel like heroes, specifically xiake, within this world. For example, the player character's skills were designed with strong wuxia characteristics to shape how the world is understood, discovered, and impacted. The world exploration was designed in layers along an emotional gradient and hierarchy. It was structured into base layers comprising points of interest, subsequent layers containing more expansive areas and medium-sized puzzles, and top layers featuring content centered on major regional bosses who serve as the emotional climaxes.

From the development team's perspective, the key to taking wuxia abroad lies in telling compelling stories that express an emotional core that resonates universally and are culturally grounded in ways that deepen the understanding for worldwide audiences, rather than in diminishing the cultural identity to accommodate. Soul, the lead designer of the global version, remarked that "[...] What we actually are seeing through all these interactions is that people resonate with emotional valence, to have all sorts of emotions about people's lives, ordinary people's lives. That shows us that, although the themes themselves are said to be wuxia, it's a particular genre: an open-world RPG. Still, underneath it is the core of this universal human experience, and that's how we reach out to the global audience."

The worldbuilding of each region was guided by a core thematic concept and involved its gradual translation into player experiences. In keeping with the game's roots in wuxia, the development team selected themes that align with the cultural heritage familiar to Chinese audiences. Qinghe, for example, is a region centered on the disappearance and emergence of the xiake. Its design revolves around the heroes shrouded in legends from a bygone era. Kaifeng is a region focused on the prosperity of a flourishing age and the decay amid the echoes of turmoil. Its design shows the juxtaposition between the situation of the poor and wealthy. Hexi is a region grounded in poetry. It is framed as a dreamscape that transcends temporal boundaries, which enables a portrayal of the late Tang dynasty. Its design reflects a sense of romanticism that is reminiscent of the classical expressive style of xieyi. One example of inspiration is the poet Wang Han, who wrote about the longing for one's hometown and the traditions of drinking wine from jade cups, in the Liangzhou chapter of the Hexi expansion. The Hidden Mountain is a region based on humanity's pursuit of wisdom and knowledge. In terms of atmosphere and environment, it features the core elements of wind, light, and stone, in which "Dappled sunlight dances across rugged mountainsides, the wind echoes through the forests, and ancient stone paths bear the marks of time." In terms of gameplay, it expands the exploration in a vertical direction. Qingzhou is a region shaped by Confucianism. Its design presents a land where mountains and seas converge. Hutuo is a region that explores the meaning of xia to reflect on what heroism means.

For the scene design, the development team conducted extensive research on historical documents, paintings, and other works to authentically represent life during the Five Dynasties and Ten Kingdoms period and early Song dynasty. These included the painting Along the River During the Qingming Festival, the painting The Night Revels of Han Xizai, the text A Dream of Sorghum, and more. Furthermore, the real-life Kaifeng and its environment was thoroughly studied for the creation of its eponymous in-game counterpart. The real-life Baishi Mountain with its marble peaks served as the inspiration for the in-game Hidden Mountain.

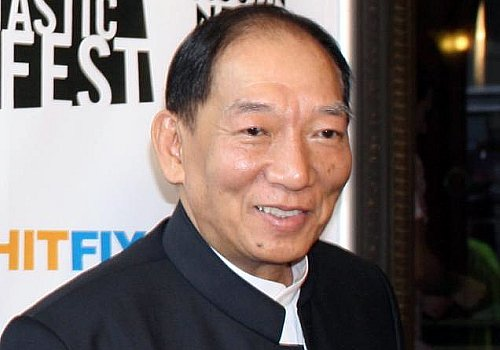
The action choreographers and film directors Stephen Tung and Yuen Woo-ping (depicted) are involved in the action design.

The action design involved motion capture of performances by martial artists. For this work, the studio partnered with Stephen Tung as the martial arts director and Yuen Woo-ping as the global action consultant. Separately, the dance design involved motion capture of performances by dancers. One example is the Dunhuang flying deities dance, which was choreographed by Tian Tian from the Beijing Dance Academy.

The sound design was thematically built around the period's culture and nature. It made use of folk songs, theater, and poetry. For example, poems were featured as lyrics in songs. The music was crafted in forms that did not merely rely on specific melodies but evoke the sounds of wind or water in ways that reflect the in-game characters' beliefs and principles. This approach was intended to express the wuxia spirit and the hearts of the people living in this world, rather than simply recreate history.

The studio has adopted parallel development as the process for creating new content. The producer team is positioned above all other teams involved in the development. Three creative teams, each assigned to work on a specific in-game region, operate in parallel. Each of these creative teams consists of a level design team, narrative design team, art design team, and project management team. The combat design team, quest design team, gameplay design team, system design team, technical design team, balance and numerical design team, and director team operate as their own distinct groups. They collaborate with the creative teams to complete work for each stage of content in the corresponding regions.

== Release ==
Everstone Studio unveiled Where Winds Meet during Gamescom 2022. In China, the game was launched in open beta for PC on December 27, 2024, and for mobile devices on January 9, 2025. A trailer published by Sony revealed that the game would be a PlayStation 5 console exclusive for at least six months after its worldwide release. The game was released worldwide for PC (Windows) and PlayStation 5 on November 14, 2025, for mobile devices (Android and iOS) on December 12, 2025, and for Xbox Series X/S on June 7, 2026.

Where Winds Meet is maintained through periodic content updates following its release. It is operated through separate Chinese and global versions, which are not fully synchronized and follow different update schedules. The developers said that fully aligning content timelines in the short term presents some practical challenges due to extensive localization work and different technical adjustments, so some gap in the overall progression will remain.

The actor Bruce Leung was enlisted to reprise his role as the Beast from the film Kung Fu Hustle to showcase the Toad Style, which was featured in the film and adapted as an in-game skill, in a live-action trailer.

== Reception ==
=== Reviews ===
Reception

Aggregate scores
Aggregator	Score
Metacritic	PC: 72/100; PS5: 74/100
OpenCritic	53% recommend

Where Winds Meet received "mixed or average" reviews from critics, according to review aggregator Metacritic.

=== Metrics ===
In the Chinese market, Where Winds Meet reached 15 million players by February 2025 (within two months) and 40 million players by July 2025 (within seven months).

In the global market, Where Winds Meet reached 15 million players by December 2025 (within one month). During the second week after release, the game reached a peak of over 250 thousand concurrent players on Steam.

Cumulatively worldwide, Where Winds Meet reached 100 million players by August 2026. According to data from early 2026, more than 60% of active players consistently participate in multiplayer modes and more than 30% of active players engage in player versus player activities.

=== Accolades ===
Ceremony	Category	Result	Ref.
The 2025 Steam Awards	Best Game You Suck At	Nominated	
29th Annual D.I.C.E. Awards	Mobile Game of the Year	Nominated	
Gamescom Award 2026	Best Mobile Game	Won	
The Game Awards 2026	Best Mobile Game	Pending	
