= LifeAfter =

2018 video game

- Developer: NetEase
- Publisher: NetEase
- Engine: NeoX
- Platforms: Android; iOS; Microsoft Windows
- Release: November 2, 2018
- Genres: Survival game, simulation game, third-person shooter
- Mode: Massively multiplayer online game

LifeAfter is a survival video game developed and published by NetEase for Android, iOS, and Microsoft Windows. The game began open beta for the iOS version on November 1, 2018, and expanded to all platforms on November 6, 2018. LifeAfter emphasizes cooperative survival gameplay in a post-apocalyptic wasteland. Players must help each other to overcome the harsh environment through activities like camp construction, map exploration, resource gathering, and combat.

== Gameplay ==
Set in a post-virus-apocalypse world, players assume the role of survivors trying to endure the dangers of the wasteland. Survivors can collect resources, craft tools and armor, and build manors. They may join private camps for mutual support. While the game primarily uses PVE mechanics, some scenes and activities include PVP elements.

Each survivor selects a profession, offering unique resource-gathering and crafting abilities. The in-game trading system uses gold bars as currency, obtainable by completing tasks.

The game features six major factions: Trade Alliance, Empire, Church, Ark Science, Dawn, and Ark City.

== Development ==
LifeAfter was developed by NetEase. The game’s producer, Li Zhe, previously worked as a planner for Tian Xia 3 and as the chief planner for League of Immortals. Development for the game began at the end of 2015, after the completion of Fight of the Immortals 2. Compared to the mainstream MMORPGs available on mobile platforms at that time, the development team aimed to explore a niche market by creating a "minority genre" game. Li Zhe, inspired by survival games like Don't Starve, This War of Mine, and The Last of Us, believed after conducting market research that the genre had growth potential.

For the game’s core experience, Li Zhe referenced psychologist Abraham Maslow's hierarchy of needs theory: whereas traditional MMORPGs focus on socialization, esteem, and self-actualization—higher-level needs in Maslow's theory—survival games deal with fulfilling basic physiological and safety needs. Li reasoned that when players are pressured by these fundamental needs, the sense of accomplishment is greater when they overcome challenges and reach higher-level needs.

To create an "immersive post-apocalyptic world," Li Zhe required the game's graphics to realistically simulate the world: with features like day-night cycles, varied weather conditions such as rain, snow, and sandstorms, and physically rendered lighting effects for realism. Early in development, in 2016, the art and design teams even traveled to Ukraine, a region facing political unrest, to visit Chernobyl while wearing protective gear to make the world’s depiction more authentic.

After finalizing the environmental design, the development team focused on designing gameplay interactions. To complement the realistic environments, the game introduced various survival attributes that players needed to manage. To avoid repetitive interactions, the team held brainstorming sessions to build a material library—first listing various challenges suitable for a post-apocalyptic world, then devising over ten possible solutions for each challenge, from which the best options were chosen to implement in the game.

Four rounds of closed beta testing were conducted before the game's release. The first round, in August 2017, involved around 5,000 participants in a small-scale technical test to gauge interest in the survival genre. The positive feedback boosted the development team's confidence. The second round, in January 2018, focused on testing camp-based social features and the early-game survival difficulty, with 15,000 participants. However, this test revealed that the survival pressure was too high: new players were often excluded by active camps and could not progress, while the blizzard conditions on the first map caused many players to die and quit. The third round, held in May, addressed these issues by adjusting camp roles to focus on socializing rather than character progression and reducing early survival difficulty. This test, which was the first to include the Android platform, attracted 50,000 participants, and player retention improved. The final round of testing occurred in August, with 120,000 players participating in a paid beta. Feedback from the third round indicated that the survival pressure had become too low, prompting the development team to reevaluate the game's positioning. In the final test, early-game survival difficulty was adjusted to a level between the second and third rounds. Players were divided into hardcore and casual groups for comparison, revealing that increasing difficulty led to a rise in hardcore players and a decrease in casual players. The development team sought to balance these two user groups in all their tests.

== Reception ==
The editor of 17173.com pointed out that although the performance of this game is slightly inferior to the excellent games on consoles and PCs, it performs well on mobile platforms, and there are few similar high-quality works in this field. However, the editor also mentioned that the existing operating methods have caused problems in the fairness of the game, which may affect the overall experience and satisfaction of players.

In the comments of Youxia.com, the synthesis system of LifeAfter is considered to be a major feature of the game, but it also has some significant shortcomings. Comments pointed out that most equipment and props need to be obtained through synthetic blueprints, and the main way to obtain blueprints is to collect fragments and gold bars or purchase them through the in-game store. However, the scarcity of gold bars and fragments significantly increases the difficulty of synthesis, which may have a negative impact on the player experience. The editor further suggested that if the game can provide more ways to obtain resources, or optimize the synthesis system, it will help improve the balance and attractiveness of the game.

Pocket Gamer's review of LifeAfter focuses on its immersive survival experience and realism. The review believes that the game's apocalyptic setting and rich and diverse scene designs (such as deserts, forests, cities, etc.) are impressive, and the exciting gameplay and attention to realistic details further enhance the sense of immersion. At the same time, the "Hope 101" survivor camp provides players with opportunities to interact and collaborate with others, but in a PVE environment, they need to be wary of potential threats from other players. In addition, the review also affirmed the game's strategic gameplay in resource management, character development, and base construction. The overall evaluation is positive and recommended for players who like survival games.

The editor of TouchArcade said that LifeAfter has not only achieved success in China with its rich content and high-quality visual effects, but has also received good responses in the international market, and attracted attention even before the launch of the English version. The game is rich in content, the exploration elements are very attractive, and it supports players to customize the image quality according to the performance of the device to optimize the gaming experience. The editor especially praised the game's touch screen control system, which is flexible and highly customizable, reminiscent of the control style of another NetEase game, Terminator 2: Judgment Day. Whether it is cooperating with others or adventuring alone, LifeAfter provides a fulfilling survival experience and has become a high-quality work worth trying.

Maria Alexander said in her review that LifeAfter is an interesting post-apocalyptic adventure game that combines elements of games such as Ark: Survival Evolved and Minecraft, optimized for mobile devices. Although the game itself is very enjoyable, she believes that if it can be further improved, the game will be more attractive and become a must-play.
