= Ace Racer =

2021 mobile game

- Developer: NetEase Games
- Publisher: NetEase Games
- Engine: Messiah Engine
- Platforms: iOS; Android
- Release: CHN: 23 July 2021; WW: 16 March 2023
- Genre: Racing game
- Modes: Single-player, multiplayer

Ace Racer is an online free-to-play racing game developed and published by NetEase Games and is available for IOS and Android. The game went into public beta in China on 23 July 2021. The global version of the game was released on 16 March 2023.

== Gameplay ==
Skills are one of the game's main elements. Above is a Bugatti La Voiture Noire using the "Triple Propulsion" skill.

Ace Racer features an arcade racing style gameplay and shares many similar features and elements seen throughout the Asphalt series. A ranked and unranked (practice) mode is available for players to compete against each other online. Players are able to use skills to aid them in an event. Different tracks are more suitable for different types of vehicles and require the player to decide the most appropriate car choice for that event. The game also features a training mode that teaches different techniques in various scenarios to the player.

The vehicle car list consists of fictional and licensed manufacturers such as Audi, BMW, Bugatti, Land Rover, McLaren, MG, Pagani, Porsche, Volkswagen, and more. Most of the vehicles can be obtained through the game's gacha system or making In-app purchases. Upgrades can be applied to vehicles in various ways as well as visual customizations such as license plate, liveries, paint, tires, and more. Each car can have one of the three roles (Main, Interference, and Support) which also come with different Ultimates respectively. Most character clothing and outfits are also obtained through the gacha system or in-app purchases.

== Development ==
Ace Racer uses Nvidia's PhysX for its engine. The game first appeared in June 2020 and a closed beta release was made available to download on their official website. The game was one of other games revealed by NetEase at the 2021 NetEase Connect Event. Along with Racing Master, this is NetEase's first time producing a game for the racing genre. An Android platform closed beta took place from 27 May to 10 June 2021. The game later released a public beta build for players in China on 23 July 2021 which allowed iOS players to participate unlike the previous beta. On 22 October 2021, the game publicly debuted at the 2021 Huawei Developer Conference. On 2 March 2022, NetEase Games Global in Singapore launched the first server closed beta test in the Philippines, which can be downloaded via Google Play Store. Shortly after the conclusion of the Philippines beta test, a closed beta test for Canada and the United States launched on 8 April 2022. After concluding the test, about a year later, the game was released worldwide on 16 March 2023.

== Chinese government regulation ==
On 1 September 2021 in accordance to the anti-addiction measures which aims to prevent video game addiction among underage players, NetEase Games updated its restriction system and required all users to have their real names tied to their account. This was to ensure any underaged players were playing with a false older age to bypass the measures. The new time zone for any players under the age of 8 to access the game is 20:00 - 21:00 on Fridays, Saturdays, Sundays, and public holidays. Players aged 8 to 16 cannot spend more than 50 yuan in one purchase and 200 yuan per month. Players aged 16 to 18 cannot spend more than 100 yuan in one purchase and 400 yuan per month.
