= Sea of Remnants =

Upcoming video game

- Developer: Joker Studio
- Publisher: NetEase Games
- Platforms: Android; iOS; PlayStation 5; Windows; Xbox Series X/S
- Genres: Role-playing, roguelike
- Mode: Single-player

Sea of Remnants is an upcoming free-to-play ocean-fantasy role-playing video game developed by Joker Studio and published by NetEase Games. It is scheduled for release in 2027 for PlayStation 5, Windows, and Xbox Series X/S.

The game features a hybrid structure combining turn-based combat during land exploration with real-time naval battles at sea, alongside roguelike progression systems.

== Gameplay ==
Sea of Remnants is structured around two primary gameplay modes: land-based exploration and maritime navigation.

On land, players engage in turn-based combat, assembling teams of characters with distinct abilities. Combat emphasizes strategic decision-making, including skill timing and team composition.

At sea, the game transitions into real-time naval combat, where players command a ship, engage enemy vessels and sea creatures, and navigate environmental hazards. Ship systems focus on functional upgrades and crew management rather than cosmetic customization.

The game incorporates roguelike elements, including variable encounters, progression resets, and evolving conditions influenced by player actions.

Players can recruit a wide range of characters, each contributing unique abilities to both combat and exploration.

== Setting ==
The game is set in a fictional ocean world centered around Orbtopia, the City Between Voyages, a hub that evolves based on player progression and decisions.

The setting features stylized non-human characters and a narrative centered on memory loss and rediscovery. Players explore islands, encounter events, and uncover fragments of the protagonist’s past.

== Development ==
Sea of Remnants is developed by Joker Studio and published by NetEase Games. The game was formally revealed in 2026, alongside a character-focused trailer introducing one of its central figures.

According to the developers, the project was designed to combine narrative-driven exploration with systemic gameplay, including roguelike progression and hybrid combat systems spanning both land and sea.

A closed alpha test, referred to as the "Wanderer Alpha", was conducted prior to release to gather player feedback and refine gameplay systems. The developer plans to implement user-generated content.

== Reception ==
Pre-release coverage of Sea of Remnants has focused on its hybrid combat design and distinctive visual style.

Several outlets noted the contrast between turn-based land combat and real-time naval gameplay as a defining feature of the title.

Commentary has also highlighted the game’s roguelike structure and its emphasis on replayability through variable encounters and evolving world states.
