= Naraka: Bladepoint =

2021 video game

- Developer: 24 Entertainment (Note: Console versions developed ThunderFire Universe X Studio)
- Publisher: NetEase Games Montreal
- Composers: Yunkoo; TRI Studio; Ryuu; Zhang Shuhao; G-Fun; Chen Junhan; Xiao Longlong
- Engine: Unity
- Platforms: Windows; Xbox Series X/S; Xbox One; PlayStation 5
- Release: Windows; August 12, 2021; Xbox Series X/S; June 23, 2022; Xbox One; December 22, 2022 - Decommissioned on August 28, 2024; PlayStation 5 July 13, 2023
- Genres: Action-adventure, battle royale
- Mode: Multiplayer

Naraka: Bladepoint (simplified Chinese: 永劫无间; traditional Chinese: 永劫無間; pinyin: yǒngjiéwújiàn; Jyutping: wing5 gip3 mou4 gaan3) is a free-to-play wuxia action battle royale game developed by 24 Entertainment and published by NetEase Games Montreal. It is a game where up to 60 players fight each other to be the last one standing. The game incorporates martial arts-inspired melee combat and features a rock-paper-scissors combat system. There are vast arsenals of melee and ranged weapons to choose from, as well as a grappling hook that can be used for both combat and traversal. In addition, each hero has unique skills and talents, allowing for customization to suit your play style. The game was released for Windows in August 2021 and was ported to Xbox Series X/S on June 23, 2022. An Xbox One version was later released on December 22, 2022. PlayStation 5 port of the game was released on July 13, 2023, and the game was made free-to-play on that date. Naraka: Bladepoint has sold more than 6 million copies globally since its launch in August 2021.

== Gameplay ==
Naraka: Bladepoint sets its premise on "Morus Isle", "Holoroth", "Perdoria", and "Wanchu" where heroes gather for battle. Players can queue up for either solo, duos or trios games and can choose from more than twenty-seven (27) different characters, while each of those has two specials (F for skill and V for ultimate).

In solo mode, players play alone, in duos with a partner, while in trio mode, players start the game with two other members in the same team to compete in the game. After matching with enough players (maximum 60 players in one round), players choose characters with different skill set, called Heroes, to play. Finishing selecting heroes, players choose one spawn location on the map, and other teammates can choose to follow or spawn wherever they like. Once players are shown on the map, the team can search for weapons grapples, health or armors to equip them up. In the meantime, the team will have to pay attention to enemy squads showing up to avoid ambush.

While players keep searching and fighting on the map, the safe zone in Naraka: Bladepoint will get smaller with a random center. However, players have time to prepare for the spreading of shadow corruption. There are multiple events in one round of the game, such as eliminating the targeted enemy, praying in front of a statue, surviving while marking yourself for the whole lobby to see you etc.

When knocked down, players are able to get on their feet again if teammates come to rescue them in a short period of time; otherwise, they will die after being cairns. However, if it is before the first round of shadow corruption spreading, players can still get back on the map and fight again by using soul altars after their death. And if playing duos or trios players have a chance at bying their teammates back from the rift dealer

In each round, a squad of heroes will win the game as the top one team.

=== Seasons ===
Seasons of Naraka: Bladepoint after release
Number	Title	Time	Description
Season 1	Tidal	August 11, 2021~November 10, 2021	110 Levels in total, and the season has more than 30 season tasks.
Season 2	Cavalry	November 11, 2021~February 14, 2022	130 Levels in total, and the new season has different awards including skins of new characters.
Season 3	Echelon	February 14, 2022~May 21, 2022	130 Levels in total, and the new season has different awards including skins of new characters.
Season 4	Ordeal	May 21, 2022~August 19, 2022	130 Levels in total, and the new season has different awards including skins of new characters.
Season 5	Dawn	August 20, 2022~September 11, 2022	130 Levels in total, and the new season has different awards including skins of new characters.
Season 6	Spark	November 17, 2022~February 15, 2023	130 Levels in total, and the new season has different awards including skins of new characters.
Season 7	Untamed	February 16, 2023~April 26, 2023	130 Levels in total, and the new season has different awards including skins of new characters.
Season 8	Reckoning	April 27, 2023~August 8 2023	130 Levels in total, and the new season has different awards including skins of new characters.
Season 9	Mythic	August 9, 2023~October 17, 2023	130 Levels in total, and the new season has different awards including skins of new characters.
Season 10	Pioneer	October 18, 2023~January 2, 2024	130 Levels in total, and the new season has different awards including skins of new characters.
Season 11	Righteous	January 3, 2024~April 9, 2024	130 Levels in total, and the new season has different awards including skins of new characters.
Season 12	Tenacity	April 10, 2024~July 1, 2024	115 Levels in total, and the new season has different awards including skins of new characters.
Season 13	Aeon	July 2, 2024~October 29, 2024	115 Levels in total, and the new season has different awards including skins of new characters.
Season 14	Aurora	October 30, 2024~December 17, 2024	115 Levels in total, and the new season has different awards including skins of new characters.
Season 15	Mirage	December 18, 2024~March 31, 2025	115 Levels in total, and the new season has different awards including skins of new characters.
Season 16	Ignis	April 1, 2025~July 8, 2025	115 Levels in total, and the new season has different awards including skins of new characters.
Season 17	Fission	July 9, 2025~October 9, 2025	115 Levels in total, and the new season has different awards including skins of new characters.
Season 18	Valiant	October 10, 2025~December 29, 2025	115 Levels in total, and the new season has different awards including skins of new characters.
Season 19	Skybreak	December 30, 2025~March 31, 2026	115 Levels in total, and the new season has different awards including skins of new characters.
Season 20	Oracle	April 1, 2026~June 30, 2026	115 Levels in total, and the new season has different awards including skins of new characters.
J Season 1	Myriad	July 1, 2026~TBD	115 Levels in total, and the new season has different awards including skins of new characters.

=== Characters ===
Naraka: Bladepoint currently has 29 playable characters, the newest being Anassa Nangong, added on September, 2026.

Yoto Hime originates from another game made by NetEase Games, Onmyoji Arena.

Ziping Yin originates from another game made by NetEase Games, Ghost Story.

Kylin Zhang originates from Xu Lei's novel series, Daomu Biji.

Xunhuan Li originates from Gu Long's novel series, Xiaoli Feidao.

Ye Xiu originates from Butterfly Blue's novel series, Quan Zhi Gao Shou.

Character List
Character	Release date	English voice actor	Japanese voice actor	Chinese voice actor
Viper Ning	August 12, 2021	Erika Ishii	Hiromi Hirata	Huang Ying
Temulch	August 12, 2021	Greg Chun	Takuya Sato	Meng Xianglong
Matari	August 12, 2021	Xanthe Huynh	Kana Ueda	Yang Menglu
Tarka Ji	August 12, 2021	Chris Naoki Lee	Yūki Ono	Liu Yijia
Tsuchimikado Kurumi	August 12, 2021	Anne Yatco	Juri Nagatsuma	Tao Dian
Tianhai	August 12, 2021	Noshir Dalal	Makoto Furukawa	Li Yuantao
Yoto Hime	August 12, 2021	Fryda Wolff	Shiori Izawa	Zhang Qi
Valda Cui	September 17, 2021	Judy Alice Lee	Shizuka Ishigami	Zhou Shuai
Yueshan	November 10, 2021	Andrew Kishino	Kaito Ishikawa	Tony Leung
Wuchen	January 19, 2022	Aleks Le	Natsuki Hanae	Li Lanling
Justina Gu	March 12, 2022	Sumalee Montano	Yui Ishikawa	Zhong Ke
Takeda Nobutada	May 20, 2022	Daisuke Tsuji	Tomokazu Sugita	Liu Beichen
Ziping Yin	August 19, 2022	Angel Lin	Fairouz Ai	Yunhe Chasing
Feria Shen	December 22, 2022	Emi Lo	Ikumi Hasegawa	Gui Niang
Akos Hu	March 16, 2023	Stephen Fu	Ryōhei Kimura	Chang Wen Tao
Zai	June 1, 2023	Kimberly Wong	Ami Koshimizu	Xiao Sibai
Tessa	August 9, 2023	Stephanie Kerbis	Mao Ichimichi	Cai Na
Hadi Ismail	November 15, 2023	Nezar Alderazi	Yūsuke Kobayashi	Liu Zhaokun
Shayol Wei	January 31, 2024	Shin-Fei Chen	Miyuri Shimabukuro	Tang Yajing
Lyam Liu	May 8, 2024	Jeremy Ang Jones	Noriaki Sugiyama	Sun Kaiyin
Kylin Zhang	August 1, 2024	Bryan Kopta	Yuichi Nakamura (voice actor)	Beichen
Cyra	October 30, 2024	Ginger Sue	TBA	Xie Ying
Lannie	January 20, 2025	Cat Protano	TBA	Mo Xiaoxiao
Inor Wan	August 7, 2025	Jesse Pinnick	TBA	Li Yang
Xunhuan Li	November 6, 2025	Daniel Van Thomas	TBA	Tu Xiongfei
Zenda Wu	February 4, 2026	Dela	TBA	Lu Minyue
Tara Gan	April 28, 2026	Aimee Smith	TBA	Zhang Huilin
Ye Xiu	July 29, 2026	Henry Schrader	TBA	TBA
Anassa Nangong	September 2, 2026	Justine Lee	TBA	TBA

== Development ==
Naraka: Bladepoint is a battle royale which was partly influenced by Devil May Cry and Sekiro. The game's producer had also included elements from the fighting game Meteor Butterfly Sword / Meteor Blade, which he had previously worked on, while Thunder Fire UX has helped with UX design and user research. Naraka: Bladepoint, along with many other titles, was officially announced during the Game Awards 2019 ceremony on December 12, 2019. From November 3 to 9, 2020, Naraka: Bladepoint had its steam server test in North America region to test its gameplay and performance. It was then announced that Naraka: Bladepoint was in development for consoles, with the game being shown running on a PlayStation 5. The mobile version provides the melee-focused combat gaming experience for mobile players globally and was released in 2022.

== Release ==
Naraka: Bladepoint launched worldwide on August 11, 2021 with more than 10 language versions.

The game was released on Xbox Series X/S on June 23, 2022, with the game also being available to Xbox Game Pass subscribers at no additional charge. In September 2021, ThunderFire Universe X Studio was officially established, shifting its focus to overseas markets and console development. The first job was to accept the commission from NetEase Thunderfire Business Division and 24 Entertainment to develop the console version of the game. An Xbox One version of Naraka: Bladepoint was released on December 22, 2022 and it's ported by ThunderFire Universe X Studio. Alongside the release date, a crossover event with Nier series, most notably Nier: Automata, was announced. Xbox One support for the game was discontinued on August 28, 2024 due to hardware limitations. The PlayStation 5 version was released on July 13, 2023 along with the game going from a paid service to free to play in all available platforms. The Vietnamese version was released on December 30, 2025.

=== Esports ===
The first official Naraka: Bladepoint tournament in Southeast Asia, Celestra Cup, started on September 9, 2021, ended season finale on December 12 and witnessed the first winner of SEA Naraka tournament, RoyHihi.

In China, the Naraka Bladepoint Pro League (NBPL) is a prestigious competition featuring multiple seasons throughout the year, boasting an annual prize pool of $750,000 and spots for the J-Cup tournament.

An integral component of this league is the J-Cup, an esteemed tournament recognized as the World Championship of Naraka Bladepoint, which held in December every year. This pinnacle event draws participation from global regions, including EU, NA, AS, SEA, and CN, as teams fight for a substantial prize pool of $1,500,000.

To secure a spot in the J-Cup, regions host qualifiers with varying prize pools. Here is how each region qualifies for the Jcup:

EU: For Contestants of the Europe region, players are selected from scrim performance and/or placement in the shadowjade cup. EU has 2 solo and 2 trios seats for the Jcup.

AS: Contestants of the Asia region are those from Japan, Korea, Hong Kong, Macao, and Taiwan and are selected from the J Cup Asia Preliminaries, Asian Challenge, and Practice Scrims. AS has 1 solo and 1 trios seat for the Jcup.

NA: The NA region is made up of contestants from North and South America. Contestants are selected from the Console Scrims, Practice Scrims and Morus Cup. NA has 3 solo seats and 2 trios seats for the Jcup.

SEA: Contestants of the South East Asia region are selected from the J Cup SEA Preliminaries, Asian Challenge, and SEA Practice Scrims. SEA has 4 solo and 3 trios seats for the Jcup.

CN: 16 teams fight for NBPL points, with the top 3 proceeding directly to the J Cup and the rest entering the CN preliminaries (except for the team with the least points, which is eliminated). They carry out 12 Scoring Stage matches over 2 days to determine which 6 proceed to the NARAKA: BLADEPOINT J Cup which leads to a total of 9 solo and trio seats for the Jcup. This in total makes the 18 seats for the solo and trios players of Jcup.

== Reception ==
Reception

Aggregate score
Aggregator	Score
Metacritic	PC: 71/100

Review scores
Publication	Score
Famitsu	32/40
GameSpot	6/10
IGN	8/10
PC Gamer (US)	73/100
PCGamesN	6/10

Naraka: Bladepoint received "mixed or average" reviews according to review aggregator platform Metacritic. In Japan, four critics from Famitsu gave the game a total score of 32 out of 40, with each critic awarding the game an 8 out of 10. The game was nominated as Best Multiplayer Game 2021 of Golden Joystick Awards on October 19, 2021, which is one of the oldest game awards globally.

=== Player count and revenue ===
The game hit over 120,000 concurrent players in its April Steam test. By November 9, 2021, the game has reached more than 6 million copies selling globally. It means that it had more than $250 million gross revenue by selling copies and in-game virtual collectibles.
