= Ding Lei =

Chinese billionaire businessman

- 丁磊
- Born: Ding Lei; 1 October 1971 (age 55); Ningbo, Zhejiang, China
- Other name: William Ding
- Education: University of Electronic Science and Technology of China
- Occupations: Founder and CEO of NetEase
- Spouse: Wang Xunfang (m. 2006)
- Children: 3

Ding Lei (Chinese: 丁磊; pinyin: Dīng Lěi; born 1 October 1971; also known as William Ding) is a Chinese billionaire businessman, and the founder and CEO of NetEase.

He has made significant contributions to the development of computer networks in mainland China. In late 2016, he was looking into investing in the property sector, and travelled to Zimbabwe in December and to the United Kingdom. As of May 2025, the Bloomberg Billionaires Index estimated Ding's fortune to be $38.9 billion. In October 2025, CEO Today Names Lei in a list of the Top50 CEO.

== Early life ==
Ding was born in Fenghua, Ningbo, Zhejiang Province, China. He graduated from the Chengdu Institute of Radio Engineering (now the University of Electronic Science and Technology of China) and obtained a bachelor's degree in telecommunications engineering.

== Career ==
After graduation, Ding worked as an engineer in a local state department in Ningbo, and worked for Sybase in Guangzhou. He founded NetEase and became the richest individual in mainland China in 2003 (7.6 billion yuan), becoming the country's first internet and gaming billionaire. According to the Hurun Report 2013, his net worth is estimated to be $5.2 billion.

In 2012, it was confirmed that Ding branched NetEase's activities out into pork production. The pig farm is centered around technology and environmental sustainability, and is not meant to become a major arm of the company.

In May 2017, venture capital firm Sinovation Ventures, US-based Meituan-Dianping, and Alibaba competitor JD invested a total of US$23 million into the firm.

In June 2020, Ding purchased a 16,000-square-foot mansion for US$29 million in Bel Air, Los Angeles, from Tesla and SpaceX founder Elon Musk.
