= Shinobido =

Shinobido may refer to:

- Shinobido: Way of the Ninja, stealth-based video game for the Sony PlayStation 2
- Shinobido: Tales of the Ninja, portable counterpart to the aforementioned title, appearing on the Sony PlayStation Portable
- Shinobido 2: Revenge of Zen, portable sequel for the PlayStation Vita
- Shinobido (film)
