= Way of the Samurai 4 =

2011 video game

- UK cover art
- Developer: Acquire
- Publishers: JP: Spike; EU: NIS America; NA: XSEED Games; WW: Ghostlight (PC)
- Director: Keisuke Kanayama
- Designer: Tetsushi Saito
- Programmer: Hiroshi Marumoto
- Composer: Noriyuki Asakura
- Series: Way of the Samurai
- Platforms: PlayStation 3 Microsoft Windows
- Release: PlayStation 3: JP: March 3, 2011; NA: August 21, 2012 (PSN); EU: October 5, 2012; Windows: WW: July 23, 2015
- Genre: Action-adventure
- Mode: Single-player

Way of the Samurai 4 (侍道4, Samurai Dou 4) is a video game developed by Acquire and published by Spike for the PlayStation 3. It was released in Japan on March 3, 2011.

An English version was announced by Rising Star Games on January 19, 2012 and released in Europe on October 5, 2012. On April 4, 2012, XSEED Games published the game in North America as a downloadable PlayStation Network title on August 21, 2012. Initially available only for PlayStation 3, the game was later released for Microsoft Windows by Ghostlight on July 23, 2015.

== Plot ==
=== Premise ===
The game takes place during the last days of the Shogunate, with its primary story taking place over five days. Players can create their samurai and choose to align themselves with one of three factions: the pro-government forces, the anti-government rebels seeking to repel foreigners, or the British Navy stationed in a city to negotiate a peace treaty. Negotiations between the Magistrate of Amihama and the British fail following an attack by the Disciples of Prajna, a nationalist group associated with the Sonnō jōi movement. Following this, the Tokugawa Shogunate sends one of its Tairō to quash the revolt.

=== Setting ===
The game is set in the fictional port city of Amihama. The city is divided into several distinct sections. To the north is the government office. To the east are the foreign settlements. To the south is the port and a bustling casino. To the west is the residential area where the local population lives. Though Amihama's specific location is not revealed, from the information in the game, it is known that it is somewhere in the southern Kantō region and along the coast. The name "Amihama" is shared with the setting of "Kenka Banchou 5" (where it takes inspiration from Yokohama), another game by publisher Spike, but the specific relationship between the two "Amihamas" is unknown.

=== Characters ===
- The Protagonist is a nameless rōnin who has just arrived in Amihama.

==== Foreigners ====
- Laura Rita is the orphaned daughter of a British millionaire and a member of a ducal family. She serves as a goodwill ambassador to Japan, representing her country during a significant trade agreement. She dislikes violence and ghosts and has a sweet tooth, keeping a stash of chocolate on her desk. In the game, she becomes a central figure in both the Foreign Power and Hidden routes.
- Count Jet Jenkins, or "JJ", is a 24-year-old count with a penchant for thrill-seeking and gambling. As Deputy Envoy to the United Kingdom, he assists Laura. Despite his flashy exterior, JJ is a skilled swordsman and marksman, even using a handgun in battle. His left arm is a prosthetic, the result of a lost bet. In his free time, JJ can often be found gambling at the local casino.
- Melinda de Cameron is a formidable female knight and Laura's bodyguard. As the captain of the Royal Marines, she commands the "Patzkin Corps". Known as a "demon captain" for her strict discipline, Melinda is a fearsome warrior in golden armor. However, beneath her stern exterior, she is vain and appreciates male attention. In battle, she wields a British-style greatsword with exceptional skill and possesses the "Fudoshin" ability, which protects her defenses from being breached. Unlike the other main characters, Melinda can be killed at any time without affecting the story. If she dies, she is replaced by a character known as the "New Captain".

==== Magistrates ====
- Hikaru Kotobuki is the Magistrate of Amihama. He is a hot-tempered man who for better or worse has a straight personality. Although somewhat idle, he is a good person at heart. As the story unfolds, he begins to break away from Kinugawa, the representative of the shogun. He uses a compound school of fighting that can use both the middle and upper stances, and among them, the "Biguban", which accumulates qi and then releases it all at once to blow away the surroundings.
- Shigeru Moro is Kotobuki's friend and manager of customs. He is unserious and always looks sleepy, but internally is always thinking about the future of his country. He aspires to incorporate cutting-edge foreign culture and technology because of his crisis with the current old shogunate, but the shogunate forces view him as an enemy as a result. He is a master of physical skills and a "handless" user who can go toe-to-toe with opponents without swords. Also, although he does not have many opportunities to show off, he has a high level of sword power. In addition, it is said that he is married from the mouth of the person himself.

==== Tokugawa Shogunate ====
- Onsen Kinugawa is a ruthless Daimyo and Tairō in the shogunate. He arrives from Edo with the mission of eradicating the Shangyi Shishi. Driven by a desire to restore the shogunate's prestige, he delights in torture and execution, particularly the gruesome method of boiling victims alive. Beyond his personal guard, the Maringumi, he commands "Kurayami no Uten", a secret group, and employs a kagemusha who is his exact double. Kinugawa's mastery of a unique swordsmanship style, which incorporates three stances, makes him a formidable opponent. He serves as the ultimate antagonist in the hidden route, representing the root of all evil in the narrative. Onsen Kinugawa's action is inspired by the Ansei Purge, during which the shogunate imprisoned, executed, or exiled those who did not support its authority and foreign policies. Onsen Kinugawa may have been inspired by Chief Minister Ii Naosuke of the Edo period.
- The Three Kinugawa Sisters consist of Mayu, Chika, and Yuri. They are the daughters of Onsen Kinugawa, known collectively as the "three cruel sisters" for their fondness of torture and execution. While they typically wear kimonos, they don special combat uniforms when engaged in battle. Each sister possesses unique fighting styles: Mayu is a skilled swordsman, Chika is a dual wielder, and Yuri specializes in spear combat.

==== Disciples of Prajna ====
- Reddo Akagi is the leader of the Disciples of Prajna.
- Jinrai Kogure is a swordsman and a close friend of Akagi, the leader of the Prajna. He serves as Akagi's right-hand man. Kogure may have been inspired by the Japanese samurai Izo Okada.

== Gameplay ==
=== Endings, events, and customization ===
Way of the Samurai 4 is considerably longer than previous games, containing 10 distinct endings. The game also features flexible events and cutscenes based on player decisions. Events are easier to follow compared to previous games. Available customization options have increased when compared to the last game, allowing players to select their features, including their face, hair, clothing, footwear, and accessories.

=== Health and energy ===
An energy meter was added in this installment. It regenerates life points (which are set at 1000) if the player is stationary or moving away in combat, and depletes when the player fights or is regenerating health. Food and sleep regenerate the energy meter. There are straw blankets in set locations near to the dojo, as well as inns around Amihama where the player can pay to sleep. Any bed the player can stand on can be used to sleep and recharge energy.

=== Combat ===
There is a wide variety of fighting styles and skills that the player can master. Swords can now be switched to any stance, and skills, once learned, are bound to the player, not to individual swords. Players can then assign learned skills to their own "school" of fighting. The "push and pull" mechanics from the first and third games have been retained. A new special mode was introduced, in which the samurai enters slow motion for a limited duration and can slash enemies repeatedly. After the samurai sheathes the sword, all dead enemies fall simultaneously. Instead of previous installments' "heat" mechanics, this entry uses "durability points", which gradually decrease with use, eventually breaking the weapon. This forces players to visit the blacksmith regularly for repairs, unless their weapons are "unbreakable".

=== Sword enhancement/creation ===
Players can go to the blacksmith to enhance their weapon's attributes (attack, defense, durability), repair it, or appraise it. The player can also ask Dojima to melt a sword down into metal and then use said metal to recast another sword. The custom sword-making system introduced in Way of the Samurai 3 also appears in the game. In addition to normal parts such as the blade, hilt, and grip, players can also add a charm that will have a special effect. Along with swords and spears, pistols and muskets have been added as weapons, with muskets primarily used by British soldiers.

=== New features ===
==== Proof of life ====
The player's actions affect the game world in the next playthrough. For example, if the player has killed a lot of townspeople in the last game, there will be more guards to hunt the player. There are many foreigners in the game, but unlike the previous game, the protagonist will be unable to understand what they say at the beginning (the texts will appear as "?????"). Players can convince the Shogunate to open a school to teach foreign languages, and the player will eventually be able to talk to foreigners.

==== Night crawling ====
There is a mini game called "yobai" where a samurai can romance an NPC by sneaking into their home at night, avoiding or knocking out family members, and pulling out the right futon to find them. The NPC will offer playful resistance, and the player must try to throw them into bed. A turtle head will guide the samurai to their target. The player can practice "night crawling" with most male and female characters in the game, as long as the requirements are fulfilled.

==== Torture ====
If arrested for doing bad deeds, the player's character will be sent to the torture room to play mini games with the three Kinugawa sisters. The torture methods include riding a flaming wooden horse, being tied to a water wheel, and being pelted by huge stones. If the samurai survives the torture, the sisters will be impressed, and he can practice "night crawling" with them.

==== Mini games ====
Besides various jobs that the samurai can get from different sources, players can earn money by fishing, working as an assassin, delivering love letters, or flirting with foreign women. The samurai can also play poker at the casino, and hanafuda at the gambling parlor.

==== Dojo ====
Players can open a dojo, take on apprentices, and fend off challengers. The reputation of the dojo depends on the number of apprentices and their quality. The player can also enlist any of their apprentices, enabling them to participate in fights alongside the apprentice.

==== Crossroads killing ====
Another feature titled "online tsujigiri" works by connecting to PSN. Through the network, player character data is automatically uploaded and transferred into other players' game worlds, where they will appear as an NPC in the form of a wandering samurai. Players can defeat these characters to obtain the custom sword the original player created.

== Downloadable content ==
A Shinsengumi costume DLC pack was offered for free from March 24 to April 27, 2011. After that, it was priced $6. Players need to apply a patch before using any downloadable content.

Hijikata Toshizō and Kondō Isami are among the downloadable Shinsengumi characters, along with Sakamoto Ryōma.

Dona Dona, from the original Way of the Samurai, and a grown-up version of the character Sayo from Way of the Samurai 2 are also available for download. Sayo will appear in the road and offer rice balls.

== Reception ==
Reception

Aggregate score
Aggregator	Score
Metacritic	(PC) 72/100 (PS3) 58/100

Upon its release, the game received mixed reviews, with the PlayStation 3 version scoring 58 out of 100 on the review aggregator site Metacritic. Many critics praised the story, customization options, various non-combat activities, and multiple endings. However, the gameplay, bugs, and technical issues were criticized.

The PC port received mixed to positive reviews, scoring 72 out of 100 on Metacritic.

=== Plus version ===
On January 26, 2012, Way of the Samurai 4 was repackaged, bundled with all DLCs, and re-released as "Way of the Samurai 4 Plus" at half price. is available as playable character in this version.
