= Aniplex =

Japanese entertainment company

Aniplex, Inc.
- Logo used since 2003

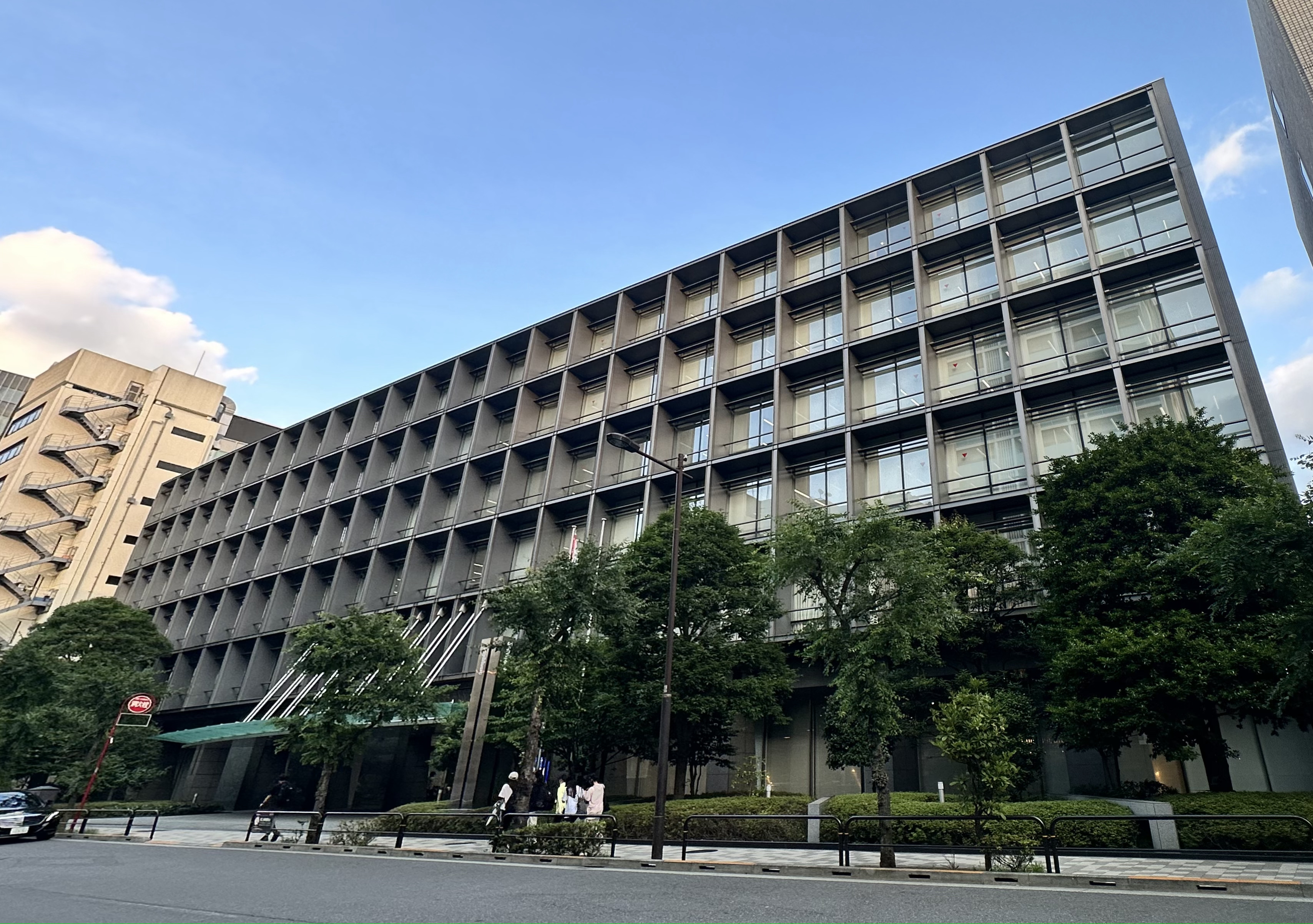
- Aniplex's headquarters at the SME Rokubanchō Building in Chiyoda, Tokyo
- Native name: 株式会社アニプレックス
- Romanized name: Kabushiki-gaisha Anipurekkusu
- Formerly: Sony Pictures Entertainment Music Publishing Inc. (1995–1997); Sony Pictures Entertainment Visual Works Inc. (1997–2001); Sony Music Entertainment Visual Works Inc. (2001–2003)
- Type: Subsidiary
- Industry: Entertainment
- Founded: September 1995; 31 years ago
- Headquarters: Rokubanchō, Chiyoda, Tokyo, Japan
- Key people: Shu Nishimoto (president & CEO); Tomonori Ochikoshi (senior executive vice president); Hiroyuki Shimizu (executive vice president); Masanori Miyake (executive vice president)
- Products: Anime; Motion pictures; Video games; Soundtracks; Merchandise; Figures; Toys; Stationery
- Revenue: ▲¥211,595 billion (FY25)
- Operating income: ▲¥39,083 billion (FY25)
- Total assets: ▲¥201,328 billion (FY25)
- Number of employees: 300 (June 16, 2023)
- Parent: Sony Music Entertainment Japan (1997–present)
- Divisions: Aniplex.exe
- Subsidiaries: See § Subsidiaries
- Website: www.aniplex.co.jp

Aniplex, Inc. (Note: Japanese: 株式会社アニプレックス, Hepburn: Kabushiki-gaisha Anipurekkusu) is a Japanese entertainment company that is a wholly owned subsidiary of Sony Music Entertainment Japan. Founded in September 1995, the company is responsible for the planning, production, and distribution of anime series, which includes original works and those based on licensed intellectual properties (IPs). It also engages in related multimedia initiatives. Its name is a possible portmanteau of Anime and Complex.

Aniplex's operations encompass the development and distribution of theatrical films, video games, and merchandise associated with its media franchises. It also releases home media, produces original soundtracks, and organizes events such as musicals, stage performances, and promotional concerts. The company manages copyrights and licensing agreements, and operates an e-commerce platform, Aniplex Online, through which it sells products directly to consumers.

While Aniplex operates globally, it maintains two main regional branches: Aniplex of America, headquartered in Santa Monica, California, and Aniplex China, based in Shanghai. Together with its sister company Sony Pictures, Aniplex co-owns Crunchyroll, LLC, which operates an eponymous streaming service with 21 million paid subscribers.

Aniplex has produced numerous notable anime series such as Fullmetal Alchemist, Gurren Lagann, Monogatari Series, Puella Magi Madoka Magica, Fate Series, Sword Art Online and Demon Slayer: Kimetsu no Yaiba. It also operates and publishes the mobile game Fate/Grand Order.

Aniplex is a member of Association of Japanese Animations (AJA), a regular member of the Computer Entertainment Supplier's Association (CESA), a supporting member of the Recording Industry Association of Japan (RIAJ), and a member of the Japan Video Software Association (JVA).

== History ==
Aniplex was established in September 1995 as a subsidiary of Sony Pictures Entertainment Japan under the name SPE Music Publishing. In January 1997, following an investment made by Sony Music Entertainment Japan, it was renamed SPE Visual Works. In January 1998, it became a joint venture between SPEJ and SMEJ, inheriting Sony Music Group video productions, with the exception of SMEJ artists' music videos.

On January 1, 2001, the company became a wholly owned subsidiary of Sony Music Entertainment Japan and adopted the name SME Visual Works. It rebranded as Aniplex on April 1, 2003, a name derived from the concept of "a complex of rights business derived from animation."

In 2004, Aniplex launched the Sugi Label in collaboration with composer Koichi Sugiyama, who is known for the Dragon Quest series soundtracks. The label was sold to King Records in 2009.

In March 2005, Aniplex established Aniplex of America, a subsidiary based in Santa Monica, California, to support licensing and distribution in English-speaking territories across North and South America. On May 9, 2005, the company founded A-1 Pictures, initially tasked with producing family-oriented series. A1 Pictures has since expanded to a broader range of animation projects.

On March 20, 2015, Aniplex and German distributor Peppermint Enterprises announced the establishment of Peppermint Anime GmbH, a joint venture aimed at expanding Japanese anime distribution in German-speaking countries. In April 2015, Aniplex also became the largest shareholder in French streaming service Wakanim, to strengthen its presence in Europe.

On January 6, 2017, Sony Music Entertainment Japan announced the launch of Sacra Music, a new label specializing in anison music. On April 1, 2017, 14 artists transferred to Sacra Music from other Sony Music Group labels, including Aniplex-affiliated artists LiSA, Kana Hanazawa, and TrySail. In collaboration with Aniplex, Sacra Music aims to strengthen its overseas expansion efforts and promote its artists' activities on a global scale by participating in events and holding overseas concerts.

On September 4, 2017, Aniplex acquired a majority stake in figure manufacturer Revolve, which is involved in the planning, development, and production of figures, becoming its largest shareholder. Through this investment, Aniplex intends to strengthen its ties with Revolve and expand its merchandising business. By enhancing the collaboration between its product planning division and Revolve, it aims to strengthen its figure product lineup and further speed up the process from planning to manufacturing and commercialization.

In November 2017, Aniplex acquired a minority interest in Madman Anime Group and in February 2019, acquired the company entirely for A$35 million.

On March 28, 2018, Aniplex announced a business and capital alliance with Live2D, the developer of the popular software of the same name, acquiring a majority stake in the company. Live 2D, which dynamically moves pictures drawn in 2D, is widely used in various applications, such as mobile games and VTubing. Following the investment, the two companies intend to collaborate to produce feature-length animated films using Live2D's technology.

On April 2, 2018, group company A-1 Pictures announced that it had renamed its Kōenji Studio to CloverWorks, giving it a unique brand identity distinguishable from its Asagaya Studio. On October 1, 2018, CloverWorks was spun off into a separate independent company, making it a direct subsidiary of Aniplex. Aniplex producer Akira Shimizu was appointed president and representative director, while Yūichi Fukushima was appointed Corporate Officer.

On November 1, 2018, Aniplex announced that it had established Rialto Entertainment, a wholly owned subsidiary responsible for independent video production and license management, on October 1. Aniplex's deputy president, Tadashi Ishibashi, was appointed representative director and chairman of the company, and veteran producer Eiichi Kamagata was named president. He served as president and representative director of Lucent Pictures Entertainment before assuming his new role at Rialto.

On April 19, 2019, Aniplex announced the establishment of a Chinese subsidiary, Aniplex (Shanghai), with full-scale operations scheduled to begin on May 7. Besides licensing its properties, the company intends to establish a storefront, develop local IP, and produce and release Chinese animation within the region.

On September 24, 2019, as part of Sony's efforts to increase collaboration between its subsidiaries and strengthen its international anime distribution business, Aniplex and Sony Pictures Television announced the consolidation of their anime streaming services Funimation, Wakanim, and Madman Anime Group under Funimation Global Group, LLC., a new joint venture led by Funimation's general manager, Colin Decker. Aniplex held a 20% stake in Funimation Global Group. In 2020, through Funimation/Aniplex, Sony Pictures Entertainment Japan bought Crunchyroll from AT&T.

On December 26, 2019, Aniplex announced the launch of a new visual novel brand named ANIPLEX.EXE. ATRI: My Dear Moments, developed by Frontwing and Makura (枕), and Adabana Odd Tales (徒花異譚, Adabana Itan), developed by Liar-soft were the brand's first two revealed titles. Both games support English, Japanese, Simplified Chinese, and Traditional Chinese language options. The two games were released on June 19, 2020, on PC via Steam worldwide and via DMM Games in Japan. Their cumulative sales have exceeded 100,000 copies as of June 19, 2021.

On April 1, 2020, Aniplex established Boundary, a 3DCG animation production company. CloverWorks president Akira Shimizu was appointed the studio's president and representative director. Since its inception, Boundary has been mainly involved in the CG production of CloverWorks projects.

On February 1, 2021, Aniplex announced a capital tie-up with f4samurai, the developer of Magia Record: Puella Magi Madoka Magica Side Story and Disney: Twisted-Wonderland, allowing Aniplex to strengthen its relationship with the studio and further enhance and expand its gaming business.

On December 15, 2021, Aniplex announced a share transfer agreement to acquire Delightworks' game development division for an undisclosed sum. On December 28, 2021, a new company, Lasengle, was established through a corporate split and inherited the gaming business of Delightworks, including the Fate/Grand Order development team. On February 1, 2022, Aniplex completed the acquisition per the share transfer agreement. Yoshinori Ono, previously president and chief operating officer of Delightworks, was appointed president and representative director of Lasengle. Aniplex's CEO, Atsuhiro Iwakami, would serve as the company chairman. Yosuke Shiokawa, the creative producer behind Fate/Grand Order, left Delightworks and Lasengle at the end of January 2022, establishing his studio Fahrenheit 213 to work on a new original franchise.

On May 30, 2022, Aniplex, its subsidiary, CloverWorks, Wit Studio, and Shueisha announced the establishment of JOEN, a joint venture in the production of animated TV series, feature films, and short clips. CloverWorks' Corporate Officer Yūichi Fukushima and WIT Studio Director Tetsuya Nakatake, producers of the adaptation of Spy × Family, a collaboration between their respective studios, were appointed representative directors of JOEN.

On February 10, 2023, Aniplex announced that its subsidiary Revolve will change its name to Claynel (株式会社クレーネル), effective April 1. Through rebranding, the company intends to expand beyond the planning and production of figures into the sales and distribution of its product line.

On May 31, 2023, Aniplex announced the acquisition of Japanese talent management firm Origamix Partners for an undisclosed sum, renaming it to Myriagon Studio on June 1. The company intends to expand the scope of its operations by developing and producing live-action projects for worldwide audiences with creators as the core, in addition to its existing film directors and screenwriters' management and IP development businesses. Additionally, Myriagon revealed a strategic partnership with South Korean production outfit Imaginus, established by Jinnie Choi, former CEO of Studio Dragon. Choi will serve as Executive Advisor to Myriagon Studio to jointly build a strong Asian premium production network.

On February 2, 2026, Aniplex announced the acquisition of Japanese production firm, Egg Firm as a wholly owned subsidiary.

== Aniplex Online Fest ==
Aniplex held its first Aniplex Online Fest on July 4–5, 2020, to celebrate its anime projects, panels with staff and cast members, and musical performances. Sally Amaki of 22/7 (Nanabun no Nijūni) served as emcee for the English version, streaming worldwide on YouTube. A Chinese podcast was available on Bilibili.

After the inaugural event, which garnered over 800,000 global views, Aniplex announced the return of Aniplex Online Fest on July 3, 2021. The 2021 lineup included updates on Demon Slayer: Kimetsu no Yaiba, Sword Art Online Progressive: Aria of a Starless Night, and Fate/Grand Order with musical performances by Aimer, ClariS, LiSA, ReoNa, and SawanoHiroyuki[nZk]. Sally Amaki returned to host the show alongside Maxwell Powers.

On September 9, 2023, Aniplex announced the return of Aniplex Online Fest. The participating lineup included ATRI – My Dear Moments, Black Butler, UniteUp!, Solo Leveling, Rurouni Kenshin: Meiji Swordsman Romantic Story, Mashle: Magic and Muscles with voice cast members Hikaru Akao, Kaito Ishikawa, Reiji Kawashima, Tomori Kusunoki, Yurika Kubo, Chiaki Kobayashi, and Soma Saito alongside MC&DJ Sally Amaki, Yoshida, and DJ Kazu.

== Anime productions ==
Aniplex has been involved in the production and distribution of the following anime series.

=== TV shows ===
| Year(s) | Title | Studio(s) | Refs. |
|---|---|---|---|
| 1996–2012 | Rurouni Kenshin | Gallop (episodes 1–66) / Studio Deen (later works) | |
| 2002–03 | Spiral: The Bonds of Reasoning | J.C.Staff | |
| 2002–17 | Naruto | Pierrot | |
| 2004–12 | Bleach | Pierrot | |
| 2005–06 | Angel Heart | TMS Entertainment | |
| 2006 | 009-1 | Ishimori Productions | |
| 2006 | Nerima Daikon Brothers | Studio Hibari | |
| 2006–07 | Black Blood Brothers | Studio Live | |
| 2007–17 | Naruto: Shippuden | Studio Pierrot | |
| 2017–23 | Boruto: Naruto Next Generations | Studio Pierrot | |
| 2007 | Mononoke | Toei Animation | |
| 2008 | Vampire Knight | Studio Deen | |
| 2008–09 | Soul Eater | Bones | |
| 2008–17 | Natsume's Book of Friends | Brain's Base | |
| 2008–09 | Black Butler | A-1 Pictures | |
| 2010 | Durarara!! | Brain's Base | |
| 2011 | Blue Exorcist | A-1 Pictures | |
| 2010–11 | The World God Only Knows | Manglobe | |
| 2011 | Puella Magi Madoka Magica | Shaft | |
| 2011 | Anohana: The Flower We Saw That Day | A-1 Pictures | |
| 2012–13 | Magi: The Labyrinth of Magic | A-1 Pictures | |
| 2012–14 | Sword Art Online | A-1 Pictures | |
| 2012–13 | Psycho-Pass | Production I.G | |
| 2013–14 | Kill la Kill | Trigger | |
| 2014–15 | Your Lie in April | A-1 Pictures | |
| 2014–15 | Fate/stay night: Unlimited Blade Works | ufotable | |
| 2014 | Tokyo Ghoul | Pierrot | |
| 2016 | March Comes in Like a Lion | Shaft | |
| 2016 | Erased | A-1 Pictures | |
| 2015–17 | Saekano: How to Raise a Boring Girlfriend | A-1 Pictures | |
| 2016 | Kabaneri of the Iron Fortress | Wit Studio | |
| 2016 | Re:Creators | TROYCA | |
| 2017 | Fate/Apocrypha | A-1 Pictures | |
| 2017 | Eromanga Sensei | A-1 Pictures | |
| 2018 | Darling in the Franxx | Trigger / A-1 Pictures | |
| 2018 | The Promised Neverland | CloverWorks | |
| 2018 | Rascal Does Not Dream of Bunny Girl Senpai | CloverWorks | |
| 2019 | Kaguya-sama: Love Is War | A-1 Pictures | |
| 2019 | Demon Slayer: Kimetsu no Yaiba | ufotable | |
| 2019–20 | Fate/Grand Order - Absolute Demonic Front: Babylonia | CloverWorks | |
| 2021 | Horimiya | CloverWorks | |
| 2021–22 | 86 ―Eighty Six― | A-1 Pictures | |
| 2022 | Bleach: Thousand-Year Blood War | Studio Pierrot | |
| 2022 | Lycoris Recoil | A-1 Pictures | |
| 2022 | Engage Kiss | A-1 Pictures | |
| 2022 | Bocchi the Rock! | CloverWorks | |
| 2022–23 | Mobile Suit Gundam: The Witch from Mercury | Sunrise | |
| 2023 | NieR: Automata Ver1.1a | A-1 Pictures | |
| 2023 | Mashle | A-1 Pictures | |
| 2024 | Solo Leveling | A-1 Pictures | |
| 2024 | Wind Breaker | CloverWorks | |
| 2024 | Demon Slayer: Kimetsu no Yaiba – Hashira Training Arc | ufotable | |
| 2024 | The Elusive Samurai | CloverWorks | |
| 2024 | Too Many Losing Heroines! | A-1 Pictures | |
| 2025 | Secrets of the Silent Witch | Studio Gokumi | |
| 2026 | Hana-Kimi | Signal.MD | |
| 2026 | Even the Student Council Has Its Holes! | Passione | |
| 2027 | The Guy She Was Interested in Wasn't a Guy at All | CloverWorks | |

=== Films ===
| Year | Title | Studio(s) | Refs. |
|---|---|---|---|
| 1991 | Roujin Z | A.P.P.P. | |
| 1995 | Memories | Madhouse | |
| 2001 | Metropolis | Madhouse | |
| 2006 | Tekkonkinkreet | Studio 4°C | |
| 2006 | The Girl Who Leapt Through Time | Madhouse | |
| 2009 | Redline | Madhouse | |
| 2010 | Welcome to the Space Show | A-1 Pictures | |
| 2011 | Puella Magi Madoka Magica the Movie: Beginnings | Shaft | |
| 2012 | Puella Magi Madoka Magica the Movie: Eternal | Shaft | |
| 2013 | Puella Magi Madoka Magica the Movie: Rebellion | Shaft | |
| 2012 | Blue Exorcist: The Movie | A-1 Pictures | |
| 2013 | The Garden of Words | CoMix Wave Films | |
| 2015 | The Anthem of the Heart | A-1 Pictures | |
| 2016 | Fate/stay night: Heaven's Feel I. presage flower | ufotable | |
| 2017 | Fate/stay night: Heaven's Feel II. lost butterfly | ufotable | |
| 2017 | Fireworks | Shaft | |
| 2018 | Fate/stay night: Heaven's Feel III. spring song | ufotable | |
| 2018 | I Want to Eat Your Pancreas | Studio VOLN | |
| 2019 | Rascal Does Not Dream of a Dreaming Girl | CloverWorks | |
| 2020 | Fate/Grand Order: Camelot – Wandering; Agaterám | Production I.G / Signal.MD | |
| 2020 | Demon Slayer: Kimetsu no Yaiba – The Movie: Mugen Train | ufotable | |
| 2021 | Fate/Grand Order: Camelot – Paladin; Agaterám | Production I.G / Signal.MD | |
| 2021 | Sword Art Online the Movie: Progressive – Aria of a Starless Night | A-1 Pictures | |
| 2022 | Sword Art Online the Movie: Progressive – Scherzo of Deep Night | A-1 Pictures | |
| 2023 | Rascal Does Not Dream of a Sister Venturing Out | CloverWorks | |
| 2023 | Rascal Does Not Dream of a Knapsack Kid | CloverWorks | |
| 2024 | Haikyu!! The Dumpster Battle | Production I.G | |
| 2026 | Rascal Does Not Dream of a Dear Friend | CloverWorks | |

=== OVAs / Specials / ONAs ===
| Year(s) | Title | Studio(s) | Refs. |
|---|---|---|---|
| 2001–02 | Read or Die | Studio Deen | |
| 2003 | Submarine 707R | Group TAC | |
| 2005 | Gunslinger Girl | Artland | |
| 2006 | Hellsing Ultimate | Satelight / Madhouse | |
| 2006 | Black Lagoon: The Second Barrage (Specials) | Madhouse | |
| 2007 | Tales of Symphonia: the Animation | ufotable | |
| 2008–09 | Gunslinger Girl: Il Teatrino – OVA | Artland | |
| 2009 | Black Lagoon: Roberta's Blood Trail | Madhouse | |
| 2010 | Mobile Suit Gundam Unicorn | Sunrise | |
| 2011 | Fate/Zero (Special) | ufotable | |
| 2012 | Fate/Zero (Special) | ufotable | |
| 2013 | Sword Art Online: Extra Edition | A-1 Pictures | |
| 2014 | Fate/stay night: Unlimited Blade Works – Sunny Day | ufotable | |
| 2014 | Mobile Suit Gundam Unicorn (Final Episode) | Sunrise | |
| 2015 | Fate/stay night: Unlimited Blade Works (Special) | ufotable | |
| 2016 | Kizumonogatari Part 1: Tekketsu-hen | Shaft | |
| 2016 | Kizumonogatari Part 2: Nekketsu-hen | Shaft | |
| 2017 | Kizumonogatari Part 3: Reiketsu-hen | Shaft | |
| 2017 | Sword Art Online: Ordinal Scale – Sword Art Offline | A-1 Pictures | |
| 2018 | Fate/Grand Order: Moonlight/Lostroom | Lay-duce | |
| 2019 | Fate/Grand Order: Moonlight/Lostroom (ONA) | Lay-duce | |
| 2019 | Demon Slayer: Kimetsu no Yaiba – Sibling's Bond | ufotable | |
| 2020 | Fate/Grand Order: First Order (Special rebroadcast) | Lay-duce | |
| 2021 | Demon Slayer: Kimetsu no Yaiba – Asakusa Arc | ufotable | |
| 2021 | Demon Slayer: Kimetsu no Yaiba – Tsuzumi Mansion Arc | ufotable | |
| 2021 | Mugen Train Arc (Specials) | ufotable | |
| 2022 | Fate/Grand Order: Final Singularity – Grand Temple of Time: Solomon | CloverWorks | |
| 2023 | Fate/strange Fake: Whispers of Dawn (Special) | A-1 Pictures | |

== Live-action productions ==
Aniplex entered the live-action field after acquiring Origamix Partners in 2023 and reorganizing it as Myriagon Studio. Their first launch, Kokuho (2025), became a notable success, becoming the highest-grossing live-action film in Japan.

=== Movies ===
| Title | Production companies | Release date |
|---|---|---|
| Kokuho | June 6, 2025 | Myriagon Studio; Credeus |

=== Series ===
| Title | Release Date | Planning & Production | Production Company | Distributor |
|---|---|---|---|---|
| The Light We Cast | April 20, 2026 | Myriagon Studio | AOI Pro. (Cooperation) | Kansai Television |
| Viral Hit | May 28, 2026 | Myriagon Studio | Rakueisha | Netflix |

== Published games ==
| Title | Developer(s) | Release Date | Platforms | Remarks |
|---|---|---|---|---|
| Fate/Grand Order | Delightworks (2015–2021); Lasengle (2021–present) | JP: July 30, 2015 (Android); JP: August 12, 2015 (iOS); NA: June 25, 2017 | Android, iOS | |
| Magia Record: Puella Magi Madoka Magica Side Story | f4samurai | JP: August 22, 2017; NA: June 25, 2019 | Android, iOS | English version shut down in October 2020. Japanese version shut down in July 2024. |
| Fate/Grand Order VR feat. Mash Kyrielight | Delightworks | JP: December 6, 2017; NA: February 26, 2019 | PlayStation VR | |
| Kirara Fantasia | Drecom | JP: December 11, 2017 | Android, iOS | Shut down in February 2023. |
| Touhou Cannonball | Quatro A | JP: September 9, 2019 | Android, iOS | Shut down in October 2020. |
| Disney: Twisted-Wonderland | f4samurai | JP: March 18, 2020; NA: January 20, 2022 | Android, iOS | |
| 22/7 Ongaku no Jikan | h.a.n.d. | JP: May 27, 2020 | Android, iOS | Shut down in December 2021. |
| Adabana Odd Tales | Liar-soft | WW: June 18, 2020 | Windows | Under ANIPLEX.EXE brand. |
| Adabana Odd Tales | Liar-soft | JP: December 16, 2021 | Android, iOS; Nintendo Switch | Ported and published by iMel. |
| La Corda d'Oro: Starlight Orchestra | Koei Tecmo | JP: February 24, 2021 | Android, iOS | |
| Atri: My Dear Moments | Frontwing, Makura | WW: June 18, 2020 | Windows | Under ANIPLEX.EXE brand. |
| Atri: My Dear Moments | Frontwing, Makura | JP: December 16, 2021 | Android, iOS; Nintendo Switch | Ported and published by iMel. |
| Fate/Grand Order: Waltz in the Moonlight/Lostroom | Delightworks | JP: August 13, 2020 | Android, iOS | Limited to 500,000 players. |
| Everyday Today's Menu for the Emiya Family | GRID | JP: April 28, 2021; NA: June 2, 2021 | Nintendo Switch | |
| Tsukihime -A piece of blue glass moon- | Type-Moon, HuneX | JP: August 26, 2021; WW: June 27, 2024 | Nintendo Switch; PlayStation 4 | |
| Melty Blood: Type Lumina | French-Bread | WW: September 30, 2021 | Nintendo Switch; PlayStation 4; Windows; Xbox One | Co-produced with Type-Moon. Published by Lasengle from 2022. |
| Demon Slayer: Kimetsu no Yaiba – The Hinokami Chronicles | CyberConnect2 | JP: October 14, 2021; WW: October 15, 2021 | PlayStation 4; PlayStation 5; Windows; Xbox One; Xbox Series X/S | Published by Sega outside of Japan. |
| Demon Slayer: Kimetsu no Yaiba – The Hinokami Chronicles | CyberConnect2 | WW: June 10, 2022 | Nintendo Switch | Published by Sega outside of Japan. |
| Tarot Boys: 22 Apprentice Fortune Tellers | Aniplex | JP: December 7, 2021 | Android, iOS | Shut down in February 2023. |
| RPG Time: The Legend of Wright | DeskWorks! | WW: March 10, 2022 | Windows; Xbox One; Xbox Series X/S | |
| RPG Time: The Legend of Wright | DeskWorks! | WW: August 18, 2022 | Nintendo Switch; PlayStation 4 | |
| Infinity Souls | Clover Lab | JP: June 30, 2022 | Android, iOS | Shut down in December 2022. |
| Witch on the Holy Night | Type-Moon, HuneX | WW: December 8, 2022 | Nintendo Switch; PlayStation 4 | |
| Witch on the Holy Night | Type-Moon, HuneX | WW: December 14, 2023 | Windows | |
| Witch on the Holy Night | Type-Moon, HuneX | JP: November 20, 2026 | Android, iOS | |
| World II World | DeskWorks! | JP: February 22, 2023 | Android, iOS | Shut down in July 2023. |
| Hira Hira Hihiru | BA-KU | WW: November 17, 2023 | Windows | Under ANIPLEX.EXE brand. |
| Murder Mystery Paradox: Fifteen Years of Summer | Fahrenheit 213 | JP: December 2, 2023 | Windows | |
| Ancient Weapon Holly | Acquire | WW: March 8, 2024 | Nintendo Switch; PlayStation 5; Windows | Co-published with Acquire. |
| Ancient Weapon Holly | Acquire | WW: March 25, 2024 | PlayStation 4 | Co-published with Acquire. |
| Demon Slayer: Kimetsu no Yaiba – Sweep the Board | CyberConnect2 | JP: April 25, 2024; WW: April 26, 2024 | Nintendo Switch | Published by Sega outside of Japan. |
| Demon Slayer: Kimetsu no Yaiba – Sweep the Board | CyberConnect2 | WW: July 16, 2024; JP: July 17, 2024 | PlayStation 4; PlayStation 5; Windows; Xbox One; Xbox Series X/S | Published by Sega outside of Japan. |
| Venture to the Vile | Cut to Bits | WW: May 22, 2024 | Windows | |
| Venture to the Vile | Cut to Bits | WW: December 18, 2024 | PlayStation 4; PlayStation 5 | |
| Alterna Vvelt: Blue Exorcist Gaiden | Bilibili, KLab China | WW: June 25, 2025 | Android, iOS | Shut down in June 2026. |
| Alterna Vvelt: Blue Exorcist Gaiden | Bilibili, KLab China | WW: January 27, 2026 | Windows | Shut down in June 2026. |
| Hookah Haze | Acquire | WW: July 11, 2024 | Nintendo Switch; Windows | |
| Fate/stay night Remastered | Type-Moon, fuzz | WW: August 7, 2024 | Nintendo Switch; Windows | |
| Seedsow Lullaby | iMel | WW: December 13, 2024 | Windows | Under ANIPLEX.EXE brand. |
| Seedsow Lullaby | iMel | WW: May 1, 2025 | Nintendo Switch; Android, iOS | Under ANIPLEX.EXE brand. |
| Puella Magi Madoka Magica: Magia Exedra | Pokelabo, f4samurai | WW: March 27, 2025 | Android, iOS | |
| Puella Magi Madoka Magica: Magia Exedra | Pokelabo, f4samurai | WW: July 17, 2025 | Windows | |
| The Hundred Line: Last Defense Academy | Media.Vision, Too Kyo Games | WW: April 24, 2025 | Nintendo Switch; Windows | |
| Demon Slayer: Kimetsu no Yaiba – The Hinokami Chronicles 2 | CyberConnect2 | JP: August 1, 2025; WW: August 5, 2025 | Nintendo Switch; PlayStation 4; PlayStation 5; Windows; Xbox One; Xbox Series X/S | Published by Sega outside of Japan. |
| Demon Slayer: Kimetsu no Yaiba – The Hinokami Chronicles 2 | CyberConnect2 | WW: October 29, 2026 | Nintendo Switch 2 | Published by Sega outside of Japan. |
| Fate/hollow ataraxia Remastered | Type-Moon, fuzz | WW: August 7, 2025 | Nintendo Switch; Windows | |
| Hyke: Northern Light(s) | Blast Edge Games | WW: September 18, 2025 | Nintendo Switch; PlayStation 5; Windows | Co-published with Akatsuki Games. iOS and macOS versions available only via Apple Arcade. |
| Hyke: Northern Light(s) | Blast Edge Games | WW: April 3, 2026 | iOS, macOS | Co-published with Akatsuki Games. iOS and macOS versions available only via Apple Arcade. |
| Resident Evil Survival Unit | Joycity | WW: November 17, 2025 | Android, iOS | |
| OCTOPinbs | Lasengle, tri-Ace | WW: May 11, 2026 | Windows | |
| Fate/Extra Record | Type-Moon Studio BB, Meteorise | WW: January 27, 2027 | Nintendo Switch; Nintendo Switch 2; PlayStation 4; PlayStation 5; Windows | |
| Melty Blood: Twi-Lumina | French-Bread | WW: April 22, 2027 | Nintendo Switch; Nintendo Switch 2; PlayStation 4; PlayStation 5; Windows; Xbox One | |
| Demon Slayer: Kimetsu no Yaiba – Keppuu Kengeki Royale | Quatro A, Soleil | JP: TBA | Android, iOS | |
| Tsukihime -The other side of red garden- | Type-Moon | TBA | TBA | |
