= Samurai Western =

2005 video game

- North American box art by Kenneth Rocafort
- Developer: Acquire
- Publishers: JP: Spike; NA: Atlus; EU: 505 Games
- Director: Toshihide Hatanaka
- Producer: Koshi Nakanishi
- Designer: Tomonori Kawanishi
- Programmer: Masatoshi Washimi
- Artist: Akiyoshi Kakinuma
- Composer: Noriyuki Asakura
- Series: Way of the Samurai
- Platform: PlayStation 2
- Release: JP: 1 January 2005; NA: 7 June 2005; EU: 30 June 2005
- Genre: Action role-playing
- Modes: Single-player, multiplayer

Samurai Western is an action-adventure video game, made by Acquire games company, released for the PlayStation 2 in 2005. The player assumes the role of a samurai named Gojiro Kiryu, who travels to the Wild West in search of his brother, Rando.

== Gameplay ==
Samurai Western does away with the adventure elements present in the main Way of the Samurai games, and instead is focused entirely on action. The game is divided into stages, with the goal of each being to defeat the dozens of enemies that appear within. The game can be played alone, or simultaneously with a second player. The game has multiple difficulty levels, ranging from Normal to Insane.

In a single-player game, the player takes control of Gojiro the samurai and utilizes various types of swords to defeat enemies. There are dozens of swords available in the game, which allow you to fight with five different sword styles. The basic maneuvers of each sword are similar, consisting of a quick combo, powerful charge move and aerial attack, but each sword style offers unique abilities. In addition to the abilities given by each style, Gojiro also has the innate ability to dodge bullets, and even uses his sword to deflect them. By defeating enemies Gojiro can fill a meter which, when full, allows him to enter Master Mode. Once activated, Master Mode greatly increases Gojiro's abilities, allowing him to dispatch enemies in a single blow.

In a two-player game, the second player controls Ralph the gunman. Ralph is unable to deflect bullets (though he is also able to dodge and roll) or engage in melee combat in the same manner as Gojiro, but is instead equipped with a gun that allows long-range attacks. He also has the ability to perform punches that instantly floor an enemy and deal a small amount of damage. Two additional guns can be unlocked for Ralph through beating the game, increasing his usefulness as a backup player.

== Plot ==
The game takes place in America in the 1800s, in the area known as the Wild West. Gojiro Kiryu, a samurai, has arrived from Japan to find and kill his brother, Rando, who came to the United States some time before. Upon his arrival, he finds the region under the tyrannical rule of a local Tycoon named Goldberg, whose hired thugs have left the nearby settlements virtual ghost towns. Although initially uninterested in these happenings, Gojiro is nonetheless drawn into conflict with Goldberg's forces as his warrior's code demands that he do the right thing and help the people being hurt by the tycoon. After learning of a connection between Goldberg and his missing brother, a final confrontation lingers.

== Development ==
Kenneth Rocafort drew the cover for a video game before he got into comics at Top Cow comics.

== Reception ==
Reception

Aggregate score
Aggregator	Score
Metacritic	58/100

Review scores
Publication	Score
Edge	6/10
Electronic Gaming Monthly	5.33/10
Game Informer	6/10
GamePro	2/5
GameSpot	5.3/10
GameSpy	3/5
GameTrailers	7.2/10
GameZone	6.5/10
IGN	6/10
Official U.S. PlayStation Magazine	3/5

Samurai Western received "mixed" reviews according to video game review aggregator website Metacritic.
