= Way of the Samurai 3 =

2008 video game

- North American box art
- Developer: Acquire
- Publishers: JP: Spike; NA: Agetec (PS3); NA: UFO Interactive (360); EU: Rising Star Games; WW: Ghostlight (PC)
- Director: Kojiro Endo
- Producer: Takuma Endo
- Designers: Koushi Nakanishi; Keisuke Kanayama
- Programmer: Satoru Koyama
- Artist: Toshio Koike
- Composer: Noriyuki Asakura
- Series: Way of the Samurai
- Engine: Gamebryo
- Platforms: PlayStation 3; Xbox 360; Windows
- Release: PlayStation 3: JP: November 13, 2008; NA: October 13, 2009; EU: March 12, 2010; Plus: JP: October 29, 2009; Xbox 360: JP: February 26, 2009; NA: October 13, 2009; EU: March 12, 2010; Windows: WW: March 23, 2016
- Genres: Action-adventure, action role-playing
- Mode: Single player

Way of the Samurai 3 (Japanese: 侍道3, Hepburn: Samurai Dou 3) is a video game made by Acquire, released by Spike on November 13, 2008, in Japan. It was released for PlayStation 3, and later ported to the Xbox 360. It is the sequel of the PlayStation 2 games Way of the Samurai and Way of the Samurai 2. A sequel, Way of the Samurai 4, was released for the PlayStation 3 in 2011.

The English version of the game was released in North America by publishers Agetec (PS3) and UFO Interactive Games (Xbox 360) on October 13, 2009, and in Europe by Rising Star Games on March 12, 2010. It was released for Windows by Ghostlight on March 23, 2016.

== Story ==
The time is the Sengoku period. The story takes place in Amana, a fictional land ruled by a rising feudal lord, Fujimori Shuzen, who had overthrown his former superior, Lord Sakurai, and became the new ruler. The Fujimori clan is an emerging force in Amana and has many enemies within its territory. In order to protect their domain, they force farmers and villagers to overwork and impose heavy taxes on them to strengthen their armed force. Because of this, people in Amana are beginning to feel discontent toward the Fujimori clan.

There are three main factions in Amana: Fujimori clan, Ouka clan, and Takatane villagers. The Ouka clan consists of vassals of the Sakurai clan and outcasts who desire power. They want to overthrow the Fujimori clan. The Takatane villagers are harmonious people only wishing for peace.

== Gameplay ==
Players have direct involvement in the plot by choosing dialogues and actions in the game. A new feature in the game is that players can draw their weapon any time during cutscenes.

There are 22 endings. After completing the game, players will retain the weapons, items, parts they obtained, money, as well as physical stats, learned skills and techniques for future replays.

Based on what they did in the game, players will receive an end-game title and Samurai Points. There are 50 different titles, ranging from "Nobody" to "Samurai 4EvR!". The total Samurai Points are used to unlock secrets, heads, clothes, and abilities.

The game encourages players to be honourable, because they will lose their total Samurai Points for doing villainous acts, and will not be able to unlock secrets.

=== Movement and time ===
Players can either walk from place to place, or travel instantly between areas by using the map. If you use the map, time will wind forward. There are eight areas in Amana: Kuchihagahara, Guard Gate, Posting Station, Takatane Village, Omiki Town, Castle Amana, Castle Minori, and The Road. Areas which have events will be marked with an Inkling "!" to allow players to follow the storyline easily.

Time is displayed by a clock on the top right corner of the screen. One minute in the game is equal to one second in real life. Time progresses as the day advances; morning, noon, evening, night, midnight, and dawn. Certain events only occur at a certain time of the day. Unlike previous games, there is no day limit in this game.

The "safe house" first introduced in Way of the Samurai 2 returns, but this time you can actually walk around. A bed, weapon safe, money safe, item box, closet, and part box can be found inside the house.

=== Combat ===
Way of the Samurai 3 focuses on sword combat. There are over 100 weapons in the game, including swords, spears, and even some joke weapons like sticks, green onion, tuna, brooms, and hoes. Players can kneel down and beg for mercy if they are losing the fight. NPCs can also do this.

The "parry" technique introduced in the last game was scrapped. Now the "push and pull" system like in the first game is used, as well as a new "instant kill" (hit-satsu) technique called "glimpse of death", which is activated after a successful awase. After an instant kill, it is possible to perform a chain kill (ren-satsu) just by approaching opponents and hitting the right buttons.

With Blunt Attack mode ON the samurai will use the blunt side of the blade, and as the result, enemies will be knocked out instead. When using blunt attack, instant kill is disabled.

Weapons will gain experience and level up. New skills can be learned by levelling up weapons. At maximum level (50), the weapon will have infinite durability and become unbreakable. You can learn unarmed fighting and dual ninja sword techniques by reading scrolls. Learned skills are now recorded with the main character and later can be assigned to newly created weapons. Once you have learned all skills for a sword stance (like middle stance), a stance mastery trophy will be unlocked.

=== Swords and spears ===
The player can enhance your swords' statistics and values by visiting the blacksmiths. In addition to that, Way of the Samurai 3 is the first in the series to allow players to build their own katana or spears by collecting parts like blades (scabbards included), guards, grips, pommels, and bringing them to the blacksmiths. Players then can set a stance and assign moves to it, and can even name their new weapon. According to the official blog, there are around 200 original parts and more than 750 skills to choose from.

The swords are still divided into seven types: middle stance (chūdan-no-kamae), upper stance (jōdan-no-kamae), lower stance (gedan-no-kamae), side stance (waki-gamae), single stance (one-handed), draw stance (fencing/battōjutsu), and ninja stance. The player can obtain the "dual wielding" ability after earning a certain number of Samurai Points.

A new stat for weapons is "weight", ranging from 0 (light) to 8 (unmovable). Heavyweight weapons are very slow.

=== Partners ===
Another notable new feature is the "partner" system. There are non-player characters in Amana who can follow the player. There are 14 partners (18 in the Plus version), from a spear-wielding widow to the ghost of a murdered woman to a cat girl called "Nya-Nya" (meow meow). Each of them has different abilities, from assisting in combat to holding weapons/items/parts. The maximum relationship point of each partner is 7.14%. To have 100%, player must raise relationship with all available partners.

=== Jobs and minigames ===
Players can do jobs for any of the three sides. Working for one side will increase the main character's popularity with that side, and terrorising them will make them hate him instead. Some of these jobs include babysitting a dog, finding runaway kids, punishing food thieves, rescuing kidnapped babies, or just killing someone.

In addition to various normal "jobs" provided by four different brokers, there are some minigames like "ring the bell", "cut vegetables", "dismantle the giant tuna", and "make mochi (sticky rice cakes)".

== Reception ==
Reception

Aggregate score
Aggregator	Score
Metacritic	PS3: 58/100; X360: 55/100

Review scores
Publication	Score
GameSpot	5.5/10
Play	16%

Famitsū gave the game a 31/40 (8-7-8-8) score. It sold 80,000 copies in the first three days in Japan.

GamesRadar gave "7 reasons you should care about Way of the Samurai 3". Chris Roper from IGN wrote a review, giving it a 6.5 overall for having "PS2 games" graphics, "meh" combat, and "not enough of a sandbox to really build a castle". On November 30, 2009, GameSpot posted a review for this game, with a 5.5/10 score.

== "Plus" version ==
A new version of the game was released for PlayStation 3 in Japan as Way of the Samurai 3 Plus on October 29, 2009. It features additional content, including four more companions (Osei, Itsuse, Araragihime, and Sensei). The English version of the game, which was released close to Plus, does not include this content. However, it features additions of the earlier Xbox 360 port.
