= Clan of Champions =

2011 video game

- North American cover art
- Developer: Acquire
- Publishers: JP: Acquire; NA: NIS America
- Platforms: Microsoft Windows, PlayStation 3
- Release: PlayStation 3: JP: November 23, 2011; NA: November 20, 2012; Microsoft Windows: NA: October 30, 2012
- Genre: Action-adventure
- Modes: Single-player, multiplayer

Clan of Champions (グラディエーターバーサス, Guradiētābāsasu; Gladiator VS) is a single and multiplayer action fighting game set in a fantasy setting. It was released on November 23, 2011 in Japan as a PS3 exclusive. The game was released in North America for Microsoft Windows and PlayStation 3 in 2012 by NIS America on behalf of developer Acquire.

The game is also known as Gladiator Vs., and is a part of the Gladiator series which has included Colosseum: Road to Freedom (2005, PS2) and Gladiator Begins (2010, PSP); the game is the first not to be set in ancient Rome.

The game includes single-player, cooperative (up to 3 player) and 3 vs. 3 player game modes, with player avatars including elf, human or orc.

== Reception ==
Reception

Aggregate score
Aggregator	Score	
Aggregator	PC	PS3
Metacritic	42/100	40/100

Review scores
Publication	Score	
Publication	PC	PS3
Famitsu	N/A	22/40
GamesRadar+	3/5	N/A

The game received "unfavorable" reviews on both platforms according to video game review aggregator Metacritic. In Japan, Famitsu gave the PS3 version a score of two sixes and two fives for a total of 22 out of 40.
