= Hookah Haze =

2024 video game

- Developer: Acquire Corp.
- Publisher: Aniplex Inc.
- Platforms: Windows, Nintendo Switch
- Release: July 11, 2024
- Genre: Visual novel

Hookah Haze is a visual novel developed by Acquire and published by Aniplex. The game was released on July 11, 2024, for Microsoft Windows and Nintendo Switch. The player takes the role of a terminally ill protagonist, whose final wish is to manage a hookah lounge. Through this new job, they meet various patrons and bond with them through hookah. The game has been compared to VA-11 Hall-A and Coffee Talk by critics.

== Gameplay & Plot ==
The protagonist, Toru Sumiki, has been sick for most of their life. With treatment options exhausted, they enter a program that allows terminally ill patients to live out their last wishes. Toru is then granted two weeks' worth of medicine and a hookah lounge on the outskirts of Akihabara to manage. During this period, Toru may form connections with the three heroines, who regularly visit the lounge. After two weeks, they have the choice of undergoing an operation that has a low chance of succeeding, or pass away peacefully.

At the start of each day, the player posts the hookah flavor of the day on social media, which determines which characters show up later that day. The patrons may also request a specific flavor of hookah. After a while, the player will be required to replace the coals of the hookah to adjust or maintain its temperature. Beyond that, much of Hookah Haze's gameplay revolves around reading dialogue, as is common in visual novels.

== Reception ==
Reception

Review scores
Publication	Score
Gaming.net	8.5/10
NookGaming	7/10
Game8	92/100
Anime News Network	B−
Final Weapon	3.5/5

Jord Tury of Gaming.net found the gameplay mechanics in Hookah Haze to be lacking, but praised its fascinating characters and dialogue. NookGaming's Daniel Joseph complimented the presentation of the game, and praises the heroines for being "engaging and fun." However, he felt that the fourteen day window was too restrictive to fully appreciate the story.

Alfonso Majarucon of Game8 praised the game's audio and visual style, strong themes, and overall story. However, they also criticized the lack of voice acting and "annoying" gameplay mechanics.

Caitlin Moore of Anime News Network pans the restrictive two week window, stating that "everything feels compressed and shallow," affecting its writing. She also found the gameplay to be unexciting and had no bearing on the plot. However, Moore concedes that the point of Hookah Haze is the "vibes," to which she agrees that "[its] vibes are impeccable."

In Final Weapon's review, they felt that Hookah Haze was tackling too many themes with its characters, with most themes left unexplored. While it failed to meet their expectations, they still enjoyed the overall story and felt the game was worth recommending, praising the neon aesthetic and fun pixel art, as well as the accompanying soundtracks.

Jakub Kejza of Anime Corner enjoyed the atmosphere and art direction of Hookah Haze, but thought it clashes with the game's heavy topic. They also had criticisms regarding character relationships developing too fast, and how messing up the gameplay barely affects the story. Overall, Kejza struggles to recommend Hookah Haze over games like VA-11 Hall-A or Coffee Talk.

== See also ==
- VA-11 Hall-A
- Coffee Talk
