= Noriyuki Asakura =

Japanese composer and vocalist

Noriyuki Asakura 朝倉 紀行
- Born: 浅倉 紀幸 (Asakura Noriyuki); 11 February 1954 (age 71); Itabashi, Tokyo, Japan
- Genres: Ambient rock; rock; jazz rock; folk rock; video game music
- Occupations: Musician, composer, vocalist
- Years active: 1982–present
- Website: n-asakura.com

Noriyuki Asakura (朝倉 紀行 (formerly 浅倉 紀幸), Asakura Noriyuki; born 11 February 1954) is a Japanese composer and vocalist, best known for composing the soundtracks to the anime series Rurouni Kenshin and the video game franchises Tenchu and Way of the Samurai. He is well known for combining traditional Japanese music with elements of rock, jazz, and other world music. He established the music production studio Mega-Alpha in 2003, which composes for various types of media.

== Career ==
Asakura was born in Itabashi, Tokyo and raised in Ehime Prefecture. Asukara was interested in music since childhood, but gained a greater interest after listening to Led Zeppelin, performing for multiple amateur rock bands as a guitarist and vocalist. While attending Nihon University, Asakura entered the music industry professionally in 1982, marking his debut by performing the theme song for Keiji Yoroshiku as Noriyuki Asakura & GANG. He has since began composing music for television programs and movies, as well as producing music for a number of Japanese pop stars during the 1980s and early 1990s. He debuted in the anime industry by composing 1987's Junk Boy, followed by Time Travel Tondekeman and the Shakotan Boogie original video animation. Asakura composed his first video game score for Crime Crackers, which released in 1994. In 1996, he composed the soundtrack to Rurouni Kenshin, which combined traditional Japanese music with rock, giving the soundtrack a contemporary feel. His compositions for the series would influence his style and later work.

In 1998, Asakura composed the soundtrack to Tenchu: Stealth Assassins, after being introduced to producer Masami Yamamoto and delivering a sample from a previous project, which became the game's opening theme. Contrary to popular belief, "Add'ua", the theme song to the first Tenchu game was not sung in Japanese, but rather in the West African language of Hausa. "Sadame", the theme song for Tenchu: Wrath of Heaven, and "Kurenai No Hana", the theme song for Tenchu: Fatal Shadows, were performed in Japanese. Following his work on Tenchu, Asakura composed the soundtrack for Acquire's Way of the Samurai. Asakura composed and performed "THE BUSTER," serving as the ending theme for Siren, which released in 2003.

In 2003, Asakura established Mega-Alpha, a music production company, in order to compose music for television programs, anime, and video games. Under Mega-Alpha, Asakura composed for multiple anime series, including Ragnarok the Animation, Major, and Rurouni Kenshin: New Kyoto Arc. In 2008, Asakura returned to the Tenchu franchise, composing Tenchu: Shadow Assassins, taking influence from his prior compositions and classical music. In 2014, Asakura composed Kadokawa Games' tactical role-playing game Natural Doctrine, which included an arrangement of "The Court of the Crimson King" by King Crimson as the ending theme song. Asakura composed additional music for Sekiro: Shadows Die Twice, which released in March 2019. In 2020, Asakura composed Katana Kami: A Way of the Samurai Story, a spin-off of the Way of the Samurai franchise. Asakura was to compose for Tokyo Babylon at King Records, which was set to premiere in 2021. The series was canceled following investigation of plagiarism regarding character designs by the production company, with a new anime production to be produced by a different studio.

Asakura composed for Rune Factory: Guardians of Azuma, which released in 2025. Asakura was approached based on his work on the Ruroni Kenshin anime in order to compose a soundtrack that would match the Japanese aesthetic of the setting, with his experiece in the game industry allowing him to better match the gameplay context. The soundtrack was recorded using a live orchestra, which Asakura suggested during development.

== Style ==
Motivated by a desire to take a different approach to soundtracks for historical Japanese fiction, Asakura combines traditional Japanese music with elements of rock, as well as folk music from multiple Asian countries including China, Thailand, and Turkey. Asakura further developed this style with Tenchu and Way of the Samurai. Asakura's style is also influenced by the way progressive rock musicians expanded on rock music in the 1970s, adopting a more experimental approach to traditional music in order to expand the horizons of its conventions.

== Works ==
Video games
| Year | Title | Notes |
|---|---|---|
| 1994 | Crime Crackers | |
| 1997 | Crime Crackers 2 | |
| 1998 | Tenchu: Stealth Assassins | |
| 2000 | Tenchu 2: Birth of the Stealth Assassins | |
| 2001 | Way of the Samurai | |
| 2003 | Tenchu: Wrath of Heaven | |
| 2003 | Way of the Samurai 2 | |
| 2003 | Siren | composed "THE BUSTER!" |
| 2004 | Tenchu: Fatal Shadows | composed "Kurenai No Hana" |
| 2004 | Capcom Fighting Evolution | |
| 2005 | Samurai Western | |
| 2005 | Tenchu: Time of the Assassins | |
| 2008 | Tenchu: Shadow Assassins | |
| 2008 | Way of the Samurai 3 | |
| 2011 | Way of the Samurai 4 | |
| 2014 | Natural Doctrine | |
| 2019 | Sekiro: Shadows Die Twice | additional music (with Yuka Kitamura) |
| 2020 | Pro Yakyuu Famista 2020 | composed "GREAT BASEBALL" |
| 2020 | Katana Kami: A Way of the Samurai Story | |
| 2025 | Rune Factory: Guardians of Azuma | |

Anime
| Year | Title | Notes |
|---|---|---|
| 1987 | Junk Boy | |
| 1989 | Time Travel Tondekeman | |
| 1991 | Shakotan Boogie | |
| 1996 | Rurouni Kenshin | |
| 2004 | Major | |
| 2004 | Ragnarok the Animation | |
| 2011 | Rurouni Kenshin: New Kyoto Arc | |
| 2014 | Knights of Sidonia | |
| 2017 | Atom: The Beginning | |
| 2018 | Zoids Wild | |
| 2020 | Tomica Kizuna Mode Combine Earth Granner | |
| 2021 | Mazica Party | |
| 2023 | I'm in Love with the Villainess | |
| TBA | Tokyo Babylon | |
