= Kamiwaza =

2006 video game

- Developer(s): Acquire
- Publisher(s): Acquire: WW: NIS America
- Platform(s): PlayStation 2 Way of the Thief; Microsoft Windows; Nintendo Switch; PlayStation 4
- Release: JP: August 31, 2006; Way of the Thief: NA: October 11, 2022; JP: October 13, 2022; EU: October 14, 2022
- Genre(s): Stealth, action
- Mode(s): Single-player

Kamiwaza is a 2006 stealth video game developed by Acquire for the PlayStation 2.

A remastered version of the game, titled Kamiwaza: Way of the Thief, was released in October 2022 for Microsoft Windows, Nintendo Switch, and PlayStation 4 via Acquire in Japan and NIS America in North America and Europe.

== Reception ==
Metacritic listed the Kamiwaza: Way of the Thief remaster as the ninth-worst game of 2022, with an average Metacritic score of 52/100.
