= Colosseum: Road to Freedom =

2005 video game

- North American cover art
- Developer: Goshow
- Publisher: Koei
- Director: Masafumi Horiuchi
- Platform: PlayStation 2
- Release: JP: February 17, 2005; NA: July 19, 2005; EU: September 9, 2005
- Genres: Fighting, role-playing
- Mode: Single-player

Colosseum: Road to Freedom (originally Gladiator: Road to Freedom in Japan) is a 2005 video game published by Koei for the PlayStation 2. It is a hybrid fighting role-playing video game loosely based on the Roman Empire around the time of the Emperor Commodus.

== Gameplay and story ==
Colosseum: Road to Freedom has the player take on the role of a slave that must partake in gladiatorial games in order to earn enough money to purchase his freedom. The majority of the game is spent training the player's character and fighting in arena battles. The story in Colosseum takes a backseat in order to allow a higher degree of open-ended gameplay. Players have the freedom to tailor their game avatar to their liking depending on how they answer questions prior to gameplay. Before entering the arena, players can participate in training sessions, allowing them to improve their skills.

Depending on the player's performance, it is possible to pay off the character's debts and still remain a freeman gladiator. The game allows for multiple endings depending on the player's performance over its course.

== Reception ==
Reception

Aggregate score
Aggregator	Score
Metacritic	56/100

Review scores
Publication	Score
Electronic Gaming Monthly	5.5/10
Eurogamer	4/10
Famitsu	31/40
Game Informer	7.25/10
GamePro	3/5
GameRevolution	D
GameSpot	6/10
GameSpy	3.5/5
GameZone	6.2/10
IGN	6/10
Official U.S. PlayStation Magazine	2.5/5
CiN Weekly	60%

The game received "mixed" reviews according to video game review aggregator Metacritic. In Japan, Famitsu gave it a score of one nine, one eight, and two sevens, for a total of 31 out of 40.

On September 1, 2005, Ertain and Koei released Gladiator: Road to Freedom Remix which contains a few updates to the game.

== Sequels ==
A sequel called Gladiator Begins was released in 2010, and a second one called Clan of Champions was released in late 2011.
