= Gladiator Begins =

2010 video game

- North American box art
- Developer: GOSHOW
- Publishers: JP: Acquire; NA: Aksys Games; EU: PQube
- Platform: PlayStation Portable
- Release: JP: January 14, 2010; NA: September 14, 2010; EU: May 27, 2011
- Genre: Fighting
- Modes: Single-player, multiplayer

Gladiator Begins (剣闘士 グラディエータービギンズ, Kentōshi Guradiētā Biginzu) is a fighting game developed by Japanese studio GOSHOW and published in Japan by Acquire on January 14, 2010, and in North America by Aksys Games on September 14. It is the prequel to the 2005 video game Colosseum: Road to Freedom, which was originally released for the PlayStation 2.

== Plot ==
Marcus Aurelius Antoninus was the last of the "Five Good Emperors". He was gifted with a brilliant mind, and his influence brought peace, both at home and abroad. However, as Marcus entered his final years, the question of succession was raised, and tempers flared. A secret feud has flared up between the aristocrats and soldiers who supported Commodus, Marcus' son and chosen heir, and those who supported General Cassius. The feud grows more desperate, and less secret, with each passing day. As Rome's days of peace begin to draw to a close, a new gladiator arrives at the Colosseum.

== Gameplay ==
Gladiator Begins is an action game which incorporates various RPG elements. Players can increase their gladiator's vitality, strength, and endurance with AP points earned by winning battles at the arena. The player first starts off by creating a custom gladiator, choosing either male or female, body size, skin color, and facial details. The player's gladiator will then begin his story working under his owner to pay off his slave debts by entering on multiple arenas.

In the arena, the player can prepare their gladiator with the proper equipments and move sets and choose from the available matches to enter. During the match, the player will attack with armed weapons or with their bare hands at other gladiator opponents. Gladiators can knock off other gladiator's weapons and armors and pick them up to use it in their favor. During different arenas and matches, there will be some replicated themes such as the battle aboard a ship and animals like tigers and elephants to fight against. After winning a match, the player will earn money and AP and return to hub area to prepare for the next day or move on with the story.

The combat control consists of using the PSP analog stick for movement and the Square and Circle Buttons to attack left and right respectively, the Triangle Button for head attack and X Button for low attack. The D-pad functions as equipping and removing weapons and armors that are dropped on the floor. Special skills can be set to the desired buttons as well.

== Development ==
The game's predecessor, Colosseum: Road to Freedom, was originally published by Ertain on February 17, 2005 in Japan. Subsequently, game developer and publisher Acquire has acquired the rights to the Gladiator series from Ertain on October 1, 2008. Gladiator Begins was originally slated to be released on November 12, 2009 in Japan, but was pushed back to January 14, 2010 due to the discovery of a critical bug. The delay has also resulted in the implementation of an install feature, which allows the game to run more efficiently.

Gladiator Begins first gained notoriety during Tokyo Game Show 2009, for its scantily clad promotional model dressed as a female gladiator. Since then, the female gladiator has been featured on a promotional alternative cover in Japan, and as an in-game downloadable content.

== Reception ==
Reception

Aggregate score
Aggregator	Score
Metacritic	59/100

Review scores
Publication	Score
Destructoid	5.5/10
Famitsu	31/40
GameSpot	6/10
IGN	6.5/10
Joystiq	3/5
PlayStation Official Magazine – UK	5/10
Play	52%
PlayStation: The Official Magazine	5/10

The game received "mixed" reviews according to video game review aggregator Metacritic. In Japan, Famitsu gave it a score of two eights, one seven, and one eight, for a total of 31 out of 40.
