= What Did I Do to Deserve This, My Lord? 2 =

2008 video game

What Did I Do to Deserve This, My Lord!? 2
- North American cover art
- Developers: Japan Studio; Acquire
- Publishers: JP: Sony Computer Entertainment; NA: Nippon Ichi Software; EU: Tecmo Koei
- Composer: Takeshi Hama
- Platform: PlayStation Portable
- Release: JP: October 16, 2008; NA: May 4, 2010; EU: May 7, 2010
- Genres: Real-time strategy, God game
- Mode: Single-player

What Did I Do to Deserve This My Lord!? 2 (formerly known as Holy Invasion of Privacy, Badman! 2: Time to Tighten Up Security!, known as Yūsha no Kuse ni Namaiki da or2, 勇者のくせになまいきだor2, literally "For a hero, [you are] quite impudent/cheeky/bold] 2)" in Japan) is a real-time strategy video game developed by Japan Studio and Acquire and published by Sony Computer Entertainment for the PlayStation Portable. It is the sequel to What Did I Do to Deserve This, My Lord? and was followed up by No Heroes Allowed!.

The game was released in Japan in 2008, and was announced for a North American release during Tokyo Game Show 2009. This release was delayed until May 4, 2010, due to NIS America changing the game's name from Holy Invasion Of Privacy, Badman! 2: Time to Tighten Up Security! to What Did I Do to Deserve This, My Lord!? 2 to avoid conflict with the Batman license. Tecmo Koei released the localized version in Europe. The UMD release includes the first game.

== Gameplay ==
The gameplay is almost identical to the first game, with a few different additions and changes. These include 'Mutation' (monsters can mutate in three forms: by deformity, by obesity and by gigantism) and 'The Overlord's Chamber', where you can grow monsters and observe their evolution. What Did I Do to Deserve This, My Lord!? 2 contains "4 times more stages, 3.3 times more monsters and 2.3 times more heroes" than the first game.
