= What Did I Do to Deserve This, My Lord? =

2007 video game

- Developers: Japan Studio; Acquire
- Publishers: JP: Sony Computer Entertainment; NA: NIS America
- Composers: Takeshi Hama; Hideki Sakamoto
- Platform: PlayStation Portable
- Release: JP: December 6, 2007; NA: July 16, 2009; EU: October 9, 2009
- Genres: Real-time strategy, god game
- Mode: Single-player

What Did I Do to Deserve This, My Lord? (Note: Japanese: 勇者のくせになまいきだ。, Hepburn: Yūsha no Kuse ni Namaiki da) is a real-time strategy video game developed by Japan Studio and Acquire and published by Sony Computer Entertainment for the PlayStation Portable. The game centers on creating mazes and monsters to help defend a demon lord from heroes seeking to capture him.

The game was released in North America exclusively as a download game on the PlayStation Store, under the title Holy Invasion of Privacy, Badman! What Did I Do to Deserve This?. However, on February 9, 2010, NIS America revealed it would be changing the game's name to avoid conflict with the Batman franchise. The game was re-released on April 22, 2010 on the PlayStation Network after it was removed to make the changes, while its sequel, What Did I Do to Deserve This, My Lord? 2, was delayed to May 4, 2010.

== Gameplay ==
Using a limited number of "Dig Power" and a pickaxe, the player must dig and create a dungeon, and populate it with monsters to defend the demon lord Badman from heroes. More steps are given when a stage is cleared, based on how well the player did. The "Dig Power" has another function, however: it is also used to upgrade monsters. The player is given some time to dig out the dungeon and create monsters before a hero comes to capture the demon lord. When the hero is about to enter the dungeon, the player must take Badman and change his location, preferably making it harder for the hero to find him. When the hero gets into the dungeon, he will navigate the dungeon until he finds and captures the demon lord. The hero will fight against any monster that gets in his way.

When the hero captures the demon lord, he will retrace the same path, taking the demon lord with him. It is possible to create monsters to save the demon lord during this.

Monsters are created depending on the number of nutrients or mana in the blocks of the dungeon. If the block is covered with moss, and the player uses his pickaxe on this block, a slime will be released. These slimes move around the dungeon, absorbing, and expelling the nutrients from adjacent blocks, creating blocks with more and more nutrients. Once a block obtains enough nutrients, it will change textures depending on just how much is in the block. Stronger, more powerful monsters will be released the more nutrients a block has. The death of monsters or heroes, along with some of the heroes' actions, has varied effects on the surrounding ground. For example, if a hero casts a spell, the surrounding blocks will be filled with mana, which can be used to create different monsters. More so, if that hero dies, the remainder of his mana is expelled onto surrounding blocks.

== Development ==
This game is mostly unknown outside Japan and is considered to be a cult hit. A sequel titled Yuusha no Kuse Ni Namaikida or2 was released featuring almost identical gameplay with a few different additions and changes. In April 2009, it was announced that the game was released in North America under the name Holy Invasion of Privacy, Badman! What Did I Do to Deserve This? On February 9, 2010, the name was changed again to What Did I Do to Deserve This, My Lord!?, to avoid infringing upon the Batman IP. A third game, No Heroes Allowed! was released in late 2010.

== Reception ==
Reception

Aggregate score
Aggregator	Score
Metacritic	69/100

Review scores
Publication	Score
GameRevolution	C−
IGN	7.7/10

With the exception of Japan, Holy Invasion of Privacy, Badman! What Did I Do to Deserve This? received average reviews. "Holy Invasion of Privacy, Badman! is an extremely quirky, challenging title that has a few frustrating elements that keep it from being a stellar downloadable," IGN said about the game. Game Revolution gave the game a C−, stating, "A weird and unique freak of nature amongst the mundane shooters and RPGs with their played out themes of morality, but it's trying too hard to be clever." The game currently holds 69/100 on Metacritic.

== Sequels ==
There have been two sequels to What Did I Do to Deserve This, My Lord? released on PSP: What Did I Do to Deserve This, My Lord? 2 and No Heroes Allowed!. A third sequel, No Heroes Allowed: No Puzzles Either!, was released in 2014 for PlayStation Vita, with a fourth, No Heroes Allowed! VR, released on October 14, 2017 for PlayStation VR.
