= Tomica Bond Combination Earth Granner =

Anime television series

- Cover of the First DVD Box Set.

トミカ絆合体 アースグランナー (Tomika Kizuna Gattai Āsu Gurannā)
- Genre: Mecha, Tokusatsu, science fiction
- Anime television series
- Directed by: Shinji Ushiro
- Written by: Yuka Yamada
- Music by: Noriyuki Asakura
- Studio: OLM Team Inoue
- Original network: TXN (TV Osaka, TV Tokyo)
- Original run: April 5, 2020 – March 28, 2021
- Episodes: 51

Tomica Kizuna Mode Combine Earth Granner (Japanese: トミカ絆合体アースグランナー, Hepburn: Tomika Kizuna Gattai Āsu Gurannā) is a Japanese anime television series produced and animated by OLM, Inc., based on the long running Tomica series of die-cast metal cars created by Takara Tomy and released for the franchise's 50th anniversary. It is directed by Shinji Ushiro (Yo-kai Watch) and written by Yuka Yamada (Miss Kobayashi's Dragon Maid, Asteroid in Love) with character designs done by Yuko Inoue (Inazuma Eleven). It began airing on all TXN stations in Japan on April 5, 2020.

== Plot ==
Raiga and Kuuga Kudou are twin brothers who like animals and sometimes help their mother in the zoo where she works. However one day, an alien gang known as Dark Spinner appeared on Earth, aiming to obtain the Earth Energy from the Earth's rotation and started to wreak havoc on the planet by summoning huge monsters known as Spingers. In the midst of chaos and the attack on their town, Raiga and Kuga heard voices calling to them, leading them to encounter the defense group Earth Granner. Raiga and Kuuga both became pilots of special machines called Gao Granners, and assume a secret identity. These machines can combine with sub-machines in order to become powerful super robots, as humanity's trump card to protect the planet from the threat of Dark Spinner.

== Characters ==
=== Granners ===
Raiga Kudou (駆動 ライガ, Kudō Raiga) / Granner R (グランナーR, Gurannā Āru)
Voiced by: Shizuka Ishigami
Twin brother of Kuuga. A 12-year-old who is chosen by Gao Granner Leo to be its partner.
Kuuga Kudou (駆動 クウガ, Kudō Kūga) / Granner K (グランナーK, Gurannā Kē)
Voiced by: Haruna Sakurai
Twin brother of Raiga. A 12-year-old who is chosen by Gao Granner Eagle to be its partner.
Kakeru Kumaneko (熊猫 カケル, Kumaneko Kakeru) / Granner X (グランナーX, Gurannā Ekkusu)
Voiced by: Yūma Uchida
A mysterious boy who is one of first Granner Candidates before Raiga and Kuuga. He disappeared a year before the events of the series, later appearing in the series being tricked into attacking the current Earth Granners by the Dark Spinner until he rejoined Earth Granner. He is also the chosen pilot for Gao Granner Saber and its partner.
Joe Pachero (ジョー・パケーロ, Jō Pakēro) / Granner J (グランナーJ, Gurannā Jē)
Voiced by: Shun Horie
A cowboy from America. He is the chosen pilot for Gao Granner Buffalo and its partner.
Go Mach (マッハゴウ, Mahha Gou) / Granner G (グランナーG, Gurannā Jī)
Voiced by: Jun Fukuyama
A famous racer who was once a candidate driver of Gao Granner Leo. He is able to become a Granner by forging a bond with Gao Granner Tyranno, becoming its chosen pilot and partner.

=== Gao Granners ===
Gao Granner Leo (ガオグランナーレオ, Gao Gurannā Reo)
Voiced by: Nobuyuki Hiyama
Raiga's Gao Granner and partner, whose motif is a Lion. Proclaimed to be the King of the Beasts (百獣の王, Hyakujū no Ō), and has a lively personality. However, he doesn't like water.
He is able to combine with his partner, Gao Granner Cheetah (ガオグランナーチータ, Gao Gurannā Chīta) using a Kizuna Gattai to form the Earth Granner Leo Cheetah (アースグランナー レオチータ, Āsu Gurannā Reo Chīta), who is armed with the Accel Sword (アクセルソード, Akuseru Sōdo), which changes into the Accel Gun (アクセルガン, Akuseru Gan).

When Granner R initiates a Type Change with the Turbo Fire Tomica (ターボファイヤートミカ, Tābo Faiyā Tomika), Leo Cheetah becomes Earth Granner Leo Cheetah Turbo Fire (アースグランナー レオチータ ターボファイヤー, Āsu Gurannā Reo Chīta Tābo Faiyā), which bestows fire abilities.
When Granner R initiates a Type Change with the Torque Rock Tomica (トルクロックトミカ, Toruku Rokku Tomika), Leo Cheetah becomes Earth Granner Leo Cheetah Torque Rock (アースグランナー レオチータ トルクロック, Āsu Gurannā Reo Chīta Toruku Rokku), which bestows earth abilities.
When Granner R initiates a Type Change with the GT-R Tomica (GT-Rトミカ, Jī Tī Āru Tomika), Leo Cheetah becomes Earth Granner Leo Cheetah GT-R (アースグランナー レオチータ GT-R, Āsu Gurannā Reo Chīta Jī Tī Āru), which grants an increase in power.

Gao Granner Eagle (ガオグランナーイーグル, Gao Gurannā īguru)
Voiced by: Satoshi Hino
Kuuga's Gao Granner and partner, whose motif is an Eagle. Both calm and intelligent but sometimes forgets when he's driven to desperation and indignation. Proclaims to be the Emperor of the Sky (空の皇帝, Sora no Kōtei).
He is able to combine with Gao Granner Cheetah to form the Earth Granner Eagle Cheetah (アースグランナー イーグルチータ, Āsu Gurannā Īguru Chīta) who is armed with the Accel Gun. He is also able to combine with his true partner, Gao Granner Shark (ガオグランナーシャーク, Gao Gurannā Shāku) to form the Earth Granner Eagle Shark (アースグランナー イーグルシャーク, Āsu Gurannā Īguru Shāku), who is armed with the Jet Arrow (ジェットアロー, Jetto Arō) which changes into the Jet Spear (ジェットスピア, Jetto Supia).

When Granner K initiates a Type Change with the Aero Tornado Tomica (エアロトルネードトミカ, Earo Torunēdo Tomika), both Eagle Cheetah and Eagle Shark becomes Earth Granner Eagle Cheetah Aero Tornado (アースグランナー イーグルチータ エアロトルネー, Āsu Gurannā Īguru Chīta Earo Torunēdo) and Earth Granner Eagle Shark Aero Tornado (アースグランナー イーグルシャーク エアロトルネー, Āsu Gurannā Īguru Shāku Earo Torunēdo), which bestows wind abilities.
When Granner K initiates a Type Change with the Screw Wave Tomica (スクリューウェーブトミカ, Sukuryū Uēbu Tomika), Eagle Shark becomes Earth Granner Eagle Shark Screw Wave (アースグランナー レオチータ トルクロック スクリューウェーブ, Āsu Gurannā Īguru Shāku Sukuryū Uēbu), which bestows water abilities.
When Granner K initiates a Type Change with the Supra Tomica (スープラトミカ, Sūpura Tomika), Eagle Shark becomes Earth Granner Eagle Shark Supra (アースグランナー イーグルシャーク スープラ, Āsu Gurannā Īguru Shāku Sūpura), which grants an increase in power.

Gao Granner Saber (ガオグランナーサーベル, Gao Gurannā Sāberu)
Voiced by: Akihiro Tajima
Kakeru's Gao Granner and partner, whose motif is a Saber-toothed tiger. He is one of the prototype Gao Granners constructed several years ago until his disappearance alongside his pilot.
He is able to combine with his partners, Gao Granner Black Panther (ガオグランナー ブラックパンサー, Gao Gurannā Burakku Pansā) and Gao Granner Crow (ガオグランナークロウ, Gao Gurannā Kurō) to form the Earth Granner Saber Panther (アースグランナー サーベルパンサー, Āsu Gurannā Sāberu Pansā), who is armed with the Saber Fangs (サーベルファング, Sāberu Fangu) and Gao Granner Crow's weapon forms: the Cross Scissor (クロスシザー, Kurosu Shizā) which changes into the Cross Boomerang (クロスブーメラン, Kurosu Būmeran).

When Granner X initiates a Type Change with the Drift Thunder Tomica (ドリフトサンダートミカ, Dorifuto Sandā Tomika), Saber Panther becomes Earth Granner Saber Panther Drift Thunder (アースグランナー サーベルパンサー ドリフトサンダー, Āsu Gurannā Sāberu Pansā Dorifuto Sandā), which bestows lightning abilities.
When Granner X initiates a Type Change with the Grip Blizzard Tomica (グリップブリザードトミカ, Gurippu Burizādo Tomika), Saber Panther becomes Earth Granner Saber Panther Grip Blizzard (アースグランナー サーベルパンサー グリップブリザード, Āsu Gurannā Sāberu Pansā Gurippu Burizādo), which bestows ice abilities.
When Granner X initiates a Type Change with the NSX Tomica (NSXトミカ, Enu Esu Ekkusu Tomika), Saber Panther becomes Earth Granner Saber Panther NSX (アースグランナー サーベルパンサー NSX, Āsu Gurannā Sāberu Pansā Enu Esu Ekkusu), which bestows an increase in power.

Gao Granner Buffalo (ガオグランナーバッファロー, Gao Gurannā Buffarō)
Voiced by: Hiromichi Tezuka
Joe's Gao Granner and partner, whose motif is a Buffalo. He is energetic, friendly and loves to show-off, but is severely loyal to Joe.
He is able to combine with Gao Granner Alligator (ガオグランナーアリゲーター, Gao Gurannā Arigētā) using a Kizuna Gattai to form the Earth Granner Buffa Gator (アースグランナー バッファゲーター, Āsu Gurannā Baffa Gētā), who is armed with the Horn Shield (ホーンシールド, Hōn Shīrudo), which doubles as the Horn Bazooka (ホーンバズーカ, Hōn Bazūka), and the Pile Ax (パイルアックス, Pairu Akkusu), which can combine with the Horn Bazooka drills to form the Pile Hammer (パイルハンマー, Pairu Hanmā).
Gao Granner Tyranno (ガオグランナーティラノ, Gao Gurannā Tirano)
Voiced by: Shintarou Oohata
Granner G's Gao Granner and partner, whose motif is a Tyrannosaurus rex. Due to being a dinosaur, his intelligence was limited and couldn't speak until he forged a bond with Go Mach, which allowed him to become a Granner.
He is able to combine with Gao Granner Triceratops (ガオグランナートリケラトプス, Gao Gurannā Torikeratopusu) using a Kizuna Gattai to form the Earth Granner Tyranno Tops (アースグランナー ティラノトプス, Āsu Gurannā Tirano Topusu), who is armed with the Mach Knuckle (マッハナックル, Mahha Nakkuru) Triceratops head, and the Mach Tail (マッハテール, Mahha Tēru), which can convert into the Mach Calibur (マッハカリバー, Mahha Karibā) longsword.
Gao Granner Red Ptera & Gao Granner Blue Ptera (ガオグランナーレッドプテラ & ガオグランナーブループテラ, Gao Gurannā Reddo Putera & Gao Gurannā Burū Putera)
Voiced by: Ryota Asari (Red Ptera); Voiced by: Rikuya Yasuda (Blue Ptera)
Duo Gao Granner jets, whose motif are two Pteranodons.

They can initiate a Custom Change combination with Earth Granner Tyranno Tops to form Earth Granner Tyranno Tops Full Custom (アースグランナー ティラノトプス フルカスタム, Āsu Gurannā Tirano Topusu Furu Kasutamu), which bestows Tyranno Tops the ability of flight and arms him with the Mach Boosters (マッハブースター, Mahha Būsutā), the dual Mach Sabers (マッハセイバー, Mahha Seibā), the Mach Rifles (マッハライフル, Mahha Raifuru) and the Mach Launchers (マッハランチャー, Mahha Ranchā).
Red Ptera can initiate a Custom Change combination with Earth Granner Leo Cheetah to form Earth Granner Leo Cheetah Red Custom (アースグランナー レオチータ レッドカスタム, Āsu Gurannā Reo Chīta Reddo Kasutamu), which bestows Leo Cheetah the ability of flight and arms him with the Mach Sabers.
Blue Ptera can initiate a Custom Change combination with Earth Granner Eagle Shark to form Earth Granner Eagle Shark Blue Custom (アースグランナー イーグルシャーク ブルーカスタム, Āsu Gurannā Īguru Shāku Burū Kasutamu), which bestows Eagle Shark the ability of flight and arms him with the Mach Rifles and the Mach Launchers.

=== Earth Granner ===
Bariki Kudou (駆動 バリキ, Kudō Bariki)
Voiced by: Shouto Kashii
Father of the twins. An engineer in Earth Granner and the developer of the Gao Granners.
Ikuzou Kumaneko (熊猫 イクゾウ, Kumaneko Ikuzou)
Voiced by: Takahiro Sumi
The Commander of the organization Earth Granner and both Kakeru and Rin's father.
Rin Kumaneko (熊猫 リン, Kumaneko Rin)
Voiced by: Emiri Suyama
Younger sister of Kakeru. Head operator of Earth Granner, who is in fact a 12-year-old and one of the twins' school mates.
Gyron (ジャイロン, Jairon)
Voiced by: Aya Endo
An AI robot developed by Bariki.
Shigeru Kokudou (国道シゲル, Kokudō Shigeru)
Voiced by: Hiromichi Tezuka
A researcher of Earth Granner, who is an expert on the super-ancient civilization.
Autobahn (アウトバーン, Autobaān)
Voiced by: Hana Sato
A researcher of Earth Granner and the assistant of Shigeru.
Earth Granner System Voice
Voiced by: Maxwell Powers
Voice of the system that plays when the characters transform and attack.

=== Jono Zoo Staff ===
Steve (スティーブ, Stīfu)
Voiced by: Jun Fukuyama
Head zookeeper of the zoo.
Madoka Kudou (駆動 マドカ, Kudō Madoka)
Voiced by: Aya Endo
Mother of the twins who works as a vet in the zoo.

=== Dark Spinner ===
Brake (ブレーキ, Burēki)
Voiced by: Takayuki Nakatsukasa
Leader of Dark Spinner and Chamber's father.
Chamber (チャンバー, Chanbā)
Voiced by: Yuki Wakai
Brake's daughter and second in command in the Dark Spinner.
Clutch (クラッチ, Kuratchi)
Voiced by: Masaki Nakanishi
A member of the Dark Spinner, a very slender male who follows Chamber's orders.
Oiler (オイラー, Oirā)
Voiced by: Seiyu Fujiwara
A member of the Dark Spinner, resembling a big fat man. He serves as the mechanic of the trio and usually shown with his AI robot Puff Puff.
Puffpuff (パフパフ, Pafupafu)
Voiced by: Tomohiro Yamaguchi
Oiler's AI assistant, who handles gathering data regarding dark energy.

== Production ==
Earth Granner was created for the Tomica franchise's 50th anniversary and follows a similar concept of combining mecha as that of its previous series Tomica Hyper Rescue Drive Head Kidō Kyūkyū Keisatsu . An official live stream in February 2020 outlined the basic concept of the upcoming anime as well as the toys, which were first released in April 2020.

Exhibition for the upcoming toyline and anime was meant to be held at the 2020 Anime Japan Expo on March 21, 2020, but the event was cancelled due to the ongoing COVID-19 pandemic and information was instead later revealed online.

== Media ==
=== Anime ===
The series began airing in Japan in all TXN affiliated stations in Japan on April 5, 2020. The opening theme song is titled "Sekai ga Kimi o Hitsuyou to Suru Toki ga Kitanda" (世界が君を必要とする時が来たんだ, Sekai ga Kimi o Hitsuyō to Suru Toki ga Kitanda; "The Time Has Come for the World to Need You") by Masayoshi Ōishi while the ending theme is titled "Bokura ga Hero" (僕らがヒーロー, Bokura ga hīrō; "We Are Heroes") by Da Vinci Poirot. The series' music is composed by Noriyuki Asakura (Major, Knights of Sidonia) Takara-Tomy Asia is currently streaming the series in Southeast Asian territories with an English Dub that premiered on November 22, 2020, in YouTube.

No.	Title	Directed by	Written by	Original release date
1	"Take off! Earth Granner Leo Cheetah!"; Transliteration: "Hasshin! Āsu Gurannā Reo Chīta!" (Japanese: 発進！アースグランナーレオチータ！)	Tsuyoshi Yoshimoto	Yuka Yamada	April 5, 2020
2	"Gale coming! Earth Granner Eagle Cheetah!"; Transliteration: "Shippu! Āsu Gurannā īguru Chīta!" (Japanese: 疾風！アースグランナーイーグルチータ！)	Naoyoshi Kusaka	Shinji Ushiro	April 12, 2020
3	"Go Go! Go Mach!"; Transliteration: "GOGOGO! Mahha gō!" (Japanese: ＧＯＧＯＧＯ！マッハ ゴウ！)	Kazuya Fujishiro	Shinji Ushiro	April 19, 2020
4	"Transform! Aero Tornado Tomica!"; Transliteration: "Taipu Chenji! Earo Torunēdo Tomika!" (Japanese: タイプチェンジ！エアロトルネードトミカ！)	Noriyuki Nakamura	Takamitsu Kōno	April 26, 2020
5	"Burn it! Turbo Fire Tomica!"; Transliteration: "Moero! Tābo Faiyā Tomika!" (Japanese: 燃えろ！ターボファイヤートミカ！)	Shigeki Awai	Yuka Yamada	May 3, 2020
6	"Pincer Attack! Pursuit from Underground and the Sky!"; Transliteration: "Hasamiuchi! Chika to sora kara oitsumero!" (Japanese: 挟み撃ち！地下と空から追いつめろ！)	Nanako Shimazaki	Keiichirō Ōchi	May 10, 2020
7	"Red Zone! Leo's in a Pinch!?"; Transliteration: "Reddozōn! Reo ga pinchi!?" (Japanese: レッドゾーン！レオがピンチ！？)	Yoshihiko Iwata	Kōjirō Nakamura	May 17, 2020
8	"Twin Burst! A Strategy Where the Other Watches Your Back!"; Transliteration: "Futago bāsuto! Senaka wa makaseta sakusen!" (Japanese: 双子バースト！背中はまかせた作戦！)	Tsuyoshi Yoshimoto	Natsuko Takahashi	May 24, 2020
9	"Fly! Earth Granner Eagle Shark!"; Transliteration: "Tobe! Āsu Gurannā Īguru Shāku!" (Japanese: 飛べ！アースグランナーイーグルシャーク！)	Kazuya Fujishiro	Kōjirō Nakamura	May 31, 2020
10	"Attack! Earth Granner Saber Panther!"; Transliteration: "Shūrai! Āsu Gurannā Sāberu Pansā!" (Japanese: 襲来！アースグランナーサーベルパンサー！)	Naoyoshi Kusaka	Takamitsu Kōno	June 7, 2020
11	"Spin Turn! Kakeru and Saber!"; Transliteration: "Supintān! Kakeru to Sāberu!" (Japanese: スピンターン！カケルとサーベル！)	Nanako Shimazaki	Yuka Yamada	June 14, 2020
12	"Activate! Torque Rock & Screw Wave!"; Transliteration: "Hatsudō! Torukurokku ando Sukuryūueibu!" (Japanese: 発動！トルクロック＆スクリューウェーブ！)	Shigeki Awai	Keiichirō Ōchi	June 21, 2020
13	"Granner vs. Granner!"; Transliteration: "Gurannā tai Gurannā!" (Japanese: グランナーＶＳ(たい)グランナー！)	Tsuyoshi Yoshimoto	Takamitsu Kōno	June 28, 2020
14	"Proceed! The Boys Expedition Team!"; Transliteration: "Susume! Shōnen tanken-tai!" (Japanese: 進め！少年探検隊！)	Yoshihiko Iwata	Natsuko Takahashi	July 5, 2020
15	"Surprise Attack! The Legendary Mechanic!"; Transliteration: "Totsugeki! Densetsu no mekanikku!" (Japanese: 突撃！ 伝説のメカニック！)	Noriyuki Nakamura	Kōjirō Nakamura	July 12, 2020
16	"OK Baby! Earth Granner Buffa Gator!"; Transliteration: "Ōkei Beibī! Āsugurannā Baffa Gētā!" (Japanese: ＯＫベイベー！アースグランナーバッファゲータ！)	Nanako Shimazaki	Yuka Yamada	July 19, 2020
17	"Protect! The Impregnable Horn Shield!"; Transliteration: "Mamore! Teppeki no Hōn Shīrudo!" (Japanese: 守れ！鉄壁のホーンシールド！)	Kazuya Fujishiro	Keiichirō Ōchi	July 26, 2020
18	"Smash! Pile Hammer!"; Transliteration: "Uchikudake! Pairuhanmā!" (Japanese: 打ち砕け！パイルハンマー！)	Nobuaki Nakanishi	Shinji Satō	August 2, 2020
19	"Threatening! Drift Thunder Tomica!"; Transliteration: "Kyōi! Dorifutosandā Tomika!" (Japanese: 脅威！ドリフトサンダートミカ！)	Noriyuki Nakamura	Takamitsu Kōno	August 9, 2020
20	"Red Flash! GT-R Tomica!"; Transliteration: "Akai senkō! jītī āru Tomika!" (Japanese: 赤い閃光！ＧＴ-Ｒトミカ！)	Shigeki Awai	Kōjirō Nakamura	August 16, 2020
21	"Overheat! The Bond Combination of Soul!"; Transliteration: "Ōbāhīto! Tamashii no Kizuna Gattai!" (Japanese: オーバーヒート！ 魂のキズナ合体！)	Yoshihiko Iwata	Yuka Yamada	August 23, 2020
22	"Farewell! Runaway Saber!"; Transliteration: "Ketsubetsu! Sāberu Bōsō!" (Japanese: 決別！サーベル暴走！)	Noriyuki Nakamura	Natsuko Takahashi	August 30, 2020
23	"Restart! Investigation of a Super-Ancient Civilization!"; Transliteration: "Risutāto! Chō Kodaibunmei o Chōsa seyo!" (Japanese: リスタート！ 超古代文明を調査せよ！)	Tsuyoshi Yoshimoto	Keiichirō Ōchi	September 6, 2020
24	"Best of the Best! Core Granner Supra!"; Transliteration: "Saijō katsu saikō! Koa Gurannā Sūpura!" (Japanese: 最上かつ最高！ コアグランナースープラ！)	Kazuya Fujishiro	Takamitsu Kōno	September 13, 2020
25	"Freeze! Grip Blizzard Tomica!"; Transliteration: "Hyōketsu! Gurippu Burizādo Tomika!" (Japanese: 氷結！ グリップブリザードトミカ！)	Nanako Shimazaki	Shinji Satō	September 20, 2020
26	"Lift Up! Floating Fortress Senkanjima!"; Transliteration: "Rifuto Appu! Fuyū Yōsai Senkanjima!" (Japanese: リフトアップ！ 浮遊要塞センカンジマ！)	Yoshihiko Iwata	Kōjirō Nakamura	September 27, 2020
27	"Overwhelming! Earth Granner Tyranno Tops!"; Transliteration: "Attō! Āsu Gurannā Tirano Topusu!" (Japanese: 圧倒！ アースグランナーティラノトプス！)	Shigeki Awai	Takamitsu Kōno	October 4, 2020
28	"Attack! Earth Granner Quiz Contest!"; Transliteration: "Atakku! Āsu Gurannā Kuizu Taikai!" (Japanese: アタック！ アースグランナ―クイズ大会！)	Naoyoshi Kusaka	Yuka Yamada	October 11, 2020
29	"The Solitary Mecha! Core Granner NSX!"; Transliteration: "Kokō no Meka! Koa Gurannā Enu Esu Ekkusu!" (Japanese: 孤高のメカ！ コアグランナーＮＳＸ！)	Masahiro Okamura	Keiichirō Ōchi	October 18, 2020
30	"Full Custom! Red and Blue Pteranodon!"; Transliteration: "Furu Kasutamu! Aka to Ao no Puteranodon!" (Japanese: フルカスタム！ 赤と青のプテラノドン！)	Nobuaki Nakanishi	Natsuko Takahashi	October 25, 2020
31	"Super Speed! Blue Custom Eagle Stream!"; Transliteration: "Chō Kōsoku! Burū Kasutamu Īguru Sutorīmu!" (Japanese: 超高速！ ブルーカスタムイーグルストリーム！)	Noriyuki Nakamura	Shinji Satō	November 1, 2020
32	"The Sleeping Lion King! Red Custom Accel Sword!"; Transliteration: "Nemureru Shishi Ō! Reddo Kasutamu Akuseru Sōdo!" (Japanese: 眠れる獅子王！ レッドカスタムアクセルソード！)	Naoyoshi Kusaka	Kōjirō Nakamura	November 8, 2020
33	"Shakedown! The Hell Rodeo!"; Transliteration: "Sheikudaun! Jigoku no Rodeo!" (Japanese: シェイクダウン！ 地獄のロデオ！)	Noriyuki Nakamura	Keiichirō Ōchi	November 15, 2020
34	"Checkered Flag! Our Granner G!"; Transliteration: "Chekkā Furaggu! Ore-tachi no Gurannā Jī!" (Japanese: チェッカーフラッグ！ オレたちのグランナ―G！)	Kazuya Fujishiro	Takamitsu Kōno	November 22, 2020
35	"Power Charge! The Lights of Family!"; Transliteration: "Pawā Chāji! Kazoku no Tomoshibi!" (Japanese: パワーチャージ！ 家族のともしび！)	Yoshihiko Iwata	Natsuko Takahashi	November 29, 2020
36	"Explosive! The Ultra Crossing Endurance Race!"; Transliteration: "Bakusō! Urutora Ōdan Taikyū Rēsu!" (Japanese: 爆走！ ウルトラ横断耐久レース！)	Nanako Shimazaki	Shinji Satō	December 6, 2020
37	"Winds and Clouds! Rush Into "Mother Ship O"!"; Transliteration: "Fūun! "Bosen Ō" e Totsunyūseyo!" (Japanese: 風雲！ 『母船オー』へ突入せよ！)	Shigeki Awai	Takamitsu Kōno	December 13, 2020
38	"Clash! Garland Canyon Great Battle!"; Transliteration: "Gekitotsu! Garando Kyanion Dai Kessen!" (Japanese: 激突！ ガランドキャニオン大決戦！)	Natsumi Uchinuma	Takamitsu Kōno	December 20, 2020
39	"Countdown! The secret of the Earth Granner!"; Transliteration: "Kauntodaun! Āsu Gurannā no Himitsu!" (Japanese: カウントダウン！ アースグランナーの秘密！)	Fumihiro Matsui	Yuka Yamada	December 27, 2020
40	"To Space! Space Custom Project!"; Transliteration: "Uchū e! Supēsu Kasutamu Keikaku!" (Japanese: 宇宙へ！ スペースカスタム計画！)	Tsuyoshi Yoshimoto	Kōjirō Nakamura	January 10, 2021
41	"Trial! White God's Wings!"; Transliteration: "Shiren! Shiroki Kami no Tsubasa!" (Japanese: 試練！ 白き神の翼！)	Taiki Nishimura	Yuka Yamada	January 17, 2021
42	"Sabi Awakens! The Targeted Earth!"; Transliteration: "Sabi Kakusei! Nerawareta Chikyū!" (Japanese: サビ覚醒！ 狙われた地球！)	Yoshihiko Iwata	Keiichirō Ōchi	January 24, 2021
43	"No Brake! Wandering Dark Spinner!"; Transliteration: "Nō Burēki! Samayoeru Dāku Supinā!" (Japanese: ノーブレーキ！ さまよえるダークスピナー！)	Naoyoshi Kusaka	Shinji Satō	January 31, 2021
44	"Formation! Earth Alliance!"; Transliteration: "Kessei! Chikyū Rengō-tai!" (Japanese: 結成！ 地球連合隊！)	Noriyuki Nakamura	Natsuko Takahashi	February 7, 2021
45	"Complete! God Change Tomica!"; Transliteration: "Kansei! Goddo Chenji Tomika!" (Japanese: 完成！ ゴッドチェンジトミカ！)	Nanako Shimazaki	Takamitsu Kōno	February 14, 2021
46	"Counterattack! Double Attack From Land and Sky!"; Transliteration: "Hangeki! Riku to Sora Kara no Daburu Atakku!" (Japanese: 反撃！ 陸と空からのダブルアタック！)	Kazuya Fujishiro	Kōjirō Nakamura	February 21, 2021
47	"Blackout! The Lost Bond!"; Transliteration: "Burakkuauto! Ushinawareta Kizuna!" (Japanese: ブラックアウト！ 失われたキズナ！)	Yoshihiko Iwata	Keiichirō Ōchi	February 28, 2021
48	"Beat of the Soul! Take Your Partner Back!"; Transliteration: "Tamashii no Kodō! Aibō o Torimodose!" (Japanese: 魂の鼓動！ 相棒を取り戻せ！)	Tsuyoshi Yoshimoto	Shinji Satō	March 7, 2021
49	"Final Battle! Operation to Conquer the Sabibreaker!"; Transliteration: "Saishū Kessen! Sabiburēkā Kōryaku Dai Sakusen!" (Japanese: 最終決戦！ サビブレーカー攻略大作戦！)	Shigeki Awai	Keiichirō Ōchi	March 14, 2021
50	"Dead Heat! Infinitely Large Bond Level!"; Transliteration: "Deddo Hīto! Kizuna Reberu Mugendai!" (Japanese: デッドヒート！ キズナレベル無限大！)	Naoyoshi Kusaka	Takamitsu Kōno	March 21, 2021
51	"Ride On! Tomica Kizuna Mode Combine Earth Granner!"; Transliteration: "Raido On! Tomika Kizuna Gattai Āsu Gurannā!" (Japanese: ライドオン！ トミカ絆合体アースグランナー！)	Tsuyoshi Yoshimoto	Yuka Yamada	March 28, 2021

=== Video games ===
Characters and units from the series were featured in the arcade crossover game Omocha ga Ataru! Roboca Battle (おもちゃがあたる！ロボカバトル, Omocha ga Ataru! Roboka Batoru; "Get the Toy! RoboCar Battle") alongside Shinkansen Henkei Robo Shinkalion and the Transformers franchises.

=== Merchandise ===
The official toys based on the series were released by Takara Tomy under the Tomica brand, including interactive role-play toys.
