= Sumioni: Demon Arts =

2012 video game

- Japanese PS Vita cover art
- Developer(s): Acquire
- Publisher(s): JP: Acquire; NA: Xseed Games
- Platform(s): PlayStation Vita, Android
- Release: JP: February 9, 2012; NA: March 20, 2012; EU: January 16, 2013
- Genre(s): Action, Platform,
- Mode(s): Single-player

Sumioni (墨鬼, Ink Demons) is a 2D action video game developed and published in Japan by ACQUIRE Corp. for the PlayStation Vita and Android.

== Development ==
The game was developed by ACQUIRE Corp. It was leaked by Japanese video game magazine Famitsu on September 7, 2011, and officially announced during Tokyo Game Show 2011 on September 16, 2011. It went on sale in Japan on February 6, 2012, and was published in North America by XSEED Games on March 20, 2012 under the title "Sumioni: Demon Arts". The game uses an art style which is reminiscent of Japanese sumi-e paintings.

XSEED Games announced on January, 2nd that it would be localizing the title for North American release within the PlayStation Vita's "launch-window" (launch window is often within the first 3-months of the hardware release).

The game has also been released on the Android platform exclusively for devices using nVidia's Tegra 3 chipset.

== Reception ==
Sumioni: Demon Arts received "mixed or average" reviews from critics, according to the review aggregation website Metacritic. In Japan, four critics from Famitsu gave the game a total score of 29 out of 40.
