= No Heroes Allowed! =

2010 video game

- Japanese cover art
- Developer(s): Japan Studio; Acquire
- Publisher(s): Sony Computer Entertainment
- Platform(s): PlayStation Portable
- Release: JP: March 11, 2010; NA: November 20, 2010
- Genre(s): Real-time strategy, God game
- Mode(s): Single-player, multiplayer

No Heroes Allowed!, released as What Did I Do to Deserve This, My Lord? 3D (Note: Japanese: 勇者のくせになまいきだ : 3D, Hepburn: Yūsha no Kuse ni Namaiki da : 3D) in Japan, is a real-time strategy video game developed by Japan Studio and Acquire and published by Sony Computer Entertainment for the PlayStation Portable. It is the sequel to What Did I Do to Deserve This, My Lord? and What Did I Do to Deserve This, My Lord? 2. Like its predecessors, The game centers on creating mazes and monsters to help defend a demon lord from heroes seeking to capture him. It was released in Japan in March 2010 and North America in November 2010 on PlayStation Network. It was the first installment in the series to not be released by NIS America overseas. It was released on PlayStation 4 and PlayStation 5 through PlayStation Plus Premium on July 19, 2022.

== Gameplay ==
The gameplay is similar to that of its predecessors with substantial improvements. Badman's daughter Badnella appears for the first time, with the duo allowing for a multiplayer mode named "Badman & Badnella". Water and aquatic monsters appear for the first time, expanding Badman's arsenal.

== Legacy ==
No Heroes Allowed! is the first game in the series to not have a convoluted localized name, rendering it to be the de facto unofficial name for the series. A sequel, No Heroes Allowed: No Puzzles Either!, was released in 2014 for PlayStation Vita, with another sequel, No Heroes Allowed! VR, released on October 14, 2017 for the PlayStation 4 through PlayStation VR.
