= Shinobido: Tales of the Ninja =

2006 video game

- European cover art
- Developer(s): Acquire
- Publisher(s): JP: Spike; EU: Sony Computer Entertainment
- Platform(s): PlayStation Portable
- Release: JP: October 26, 2006; PAL: February 9, 2007
- Genre(s): Stealth
- Mode(s): Single-player, multiplayer

Shinobido: Tales of the Ninja, known in Japan as Shinobidō: Homura (忍道 焔), is a stealth game developed by Acquire and published by Spike for the PlayStation Portable. It is a spin-off to Shinobido: Way of the Ninja. A North American version was to be released as Shinobido Homura: Soul of the Ninja but was cancelled. The game was followed by a true sequel to the original game, Shinobido 2: Revenge of Zen.

== Gameplay ==
The general gameplay is very similar to Shinobido: Way of the Ninja with a few differences. Unlike its predecessor, the game does not feature a mission generator which allowed players to choose an allegiance with a warlord. Instead a map is traversed which lets the player select missions. By completing missions new missions and playable characters are unlocked. Due to the difference in the control scheme compared to Way of the Ninja, Tales of the Ninja only allows four items to be accessed directly.

By using a USB cable, players can import their custom missions created with the mission editor from the console version onto the portable version. However, the second set of items and the item inventory were removed completely which could render a player's own custom missions unplayable, if not re-edited with the limitations in mind. The game also includes a multiplayer mode which allows multiple players to compete against each other on preset maps or the maps from their custom missions.

== Plot ==
After the events of the previous game, the Asuka ninja successfully rebuilt their village. The story begins when Goh receives a letter from the Amurita Faith leader Lady Sadame stating that the Fudo province lord Kagetora Akame hired the Taraba ninja leader Kabuto to steal her documents. Utakata lord Nobuteru Ichijo plans to marry the daughter of the neighboring lord, Princess Azami, but her father will only accept, if Goh eliminates the Kenobi ninja. On the wedding day, mysterious bandits attack Ichijo, but are stopped by Goh who is then sent to investigate. Goh finds out that three samurai generals have been betraying Ichijo, captures one of them, and discovers that Miroku, Sadame's priestess, was responsible for the wedding incident. The documents he retrieves from Akame were Sadame's diaries stating that the Amuritha Faith is just her creation. Goh heads to Miroku's convent, defeats her, then suddenly vanishes. In the morning, Zaji and Kinu search for Goh at the convent, but they find nothing but dead bodies of Miroku and her followers. Kinu, in a sad voice, says that 'he left us again'.

== Reception ==
Reception

Aggregate score
Aggregator	Score
Metacritic	50/100

Review scores
Publication	Score
Eurogamer	3/10
Famitsu	28/40
PlayStation Official Magazine – UK	(OPS2) 5/10; 4/10
PALGN	3.5/10
Play	60%
VideoGamer.com	6/10

The game received "mixed" reviews according to the review aggregation website Metacritic. In Japan, Famitsu gave it a score of one eight, two sevens, and one six for a total of 28 out of 40.
