= Shakotan Boogie =

Japanese manga series

- Cover of the first manga volume (Kindle edition)

シャコタン★ブギ (Shakotan Bugi)
- Genre: Yankī
- Manga
- Written by: Michiharu Kusunoki
- Published by: Kodansha
- Imprint: Yanmaga KC Special
- Magazine: Weekly Young Magazine
- Original run: 1986 – 1996
- Volumes: 32
- Original video animation
- Directed by: Hirotaka Kinoshita (1–2); Shinichi Tokairin (3–4)
- Produced by: Yuji Nunokawa
- Music by: Noriyuki Asakura
- Studio: Pierrot
- Released: February 6, 1991 – July 17, 1992
- Episodes: 4

Shakotan Boogie (Japanese: シャコタン★ブギ, Hepburn: Shakotan Bugi) is a Japanese manga series written and illustrated by Michiharu Kusunoki. It was serialized in Kodansha's seinen manga magazine Weekly Young Magazine from 1986 to 1996, with its chapters collected in 32 tankōbon volumes. It follows the adventures of two friends interested in shakotan, the Japanese term for lowriders. While getting into trouble, picking up girls, and street racing, these two guys have a blast in the world of Shakotan.

== Characters ==
Hajime Yamamoto (山本はじめ, Yamamoto Hajime) and Koji Watanabe (渡辺滉ニ, Watanabe Kōji)
The main characters of the story and classmates, who cruise around in their Soarer getting into all sorts of trouble. They like to pick up girls, deal with bosozoku and chinpira, and run from police. Their Soarer has number "67" decals on bonnet and doors, and is white with blue and pink accentuations. They drive a Toyota Soarer 2800GT (MZ11). Hajime also owns a Toyota Celsior (UCF10).
Akira Shimizu (清水明, Shimizu Akira)
A driver of a dump truck, whose Nissan Fairlady Z (S30) is always driving very fast (akin to Akio Asakura's Devil Z). Akira's S30Z had a bored and stroked version of the original engine and was also bodykitted with "G-nose" package with "Yanky Mate!" label on its golden-colored chassis, thus called "Akira Z". He had a drag racing battle with Hajime's Soarer.
Junichi Nomura (野村純一, Nomura Junichi)
A man who owns a repairing shop (a reference to Ruf Automobile). He is also tuning people's cars (including his Skyline). His Nissan Skyline 2000 GT-R (KPGC10) (known as Hakosuka, or Boxy Skyline) has a tuned L28 engine and some useful performance enhancements such as an external oil cooler and later turbocharging. However, during a battle with Mayumi the 7th, his Skyline quickly got wiped out, and crashed into barriers, but he managed to repair it. He had dreamt of driving his Skyline in Fuji Speedway, and was interested in cars and women.
Mayumi the 7th (セブンのマユミ, Sebun no Mayumi)
A mysterious woman which was often called "The Legendary Street Racer", and works at snack bar, she drives a rotary engined Mazda RX-7, and is very fast in the touge racing even in corners. She defeated Junichi's C10 Skyline on Hakone, and also races with Akira and Hajime. Her RX-7 has two tone colorings, which was popular color design among 1980s with the introduction of AE86 and S13, and with red-colored bumpers. In the third episode of OVA anime, she appears to use a manual boost controller.

== Media ==
=== Manga ===
Written and illustrated by Michiharu Kusunoki, Shakotan Boogie was first published as a one-shot for the Kodansha's Weekly Young Magazine's competition project, Kayō Manga Daizenshū, which ran from 1984 to 1985. It started its serialization in Weekly Young Magazine in 1986 and finished in 1996. Kodansha collected its chapters in 32 tankōbon volumes, released from March 14, 1986, to August 3, 1996.

=== Live-action film ===
A live-action film adaptation produced by Toei Company was released in 1987.

=== Original video animation ===
A four-episode original video animation (OVA), animated by Pierrot, was released from February 6, 1991, to July 17, 1992.
