= Natural Doctrine =

2014 video game

NAtURAL DOCtRINE
- Developer: Kadokawa Games
- Publishers: JP: Kadokawa Games; WW: NIS America
- Director: Atsushi Ii
- Producer: Kensuke Tanaka
- Artist: Atsushi Ikariya
- Composer: Noriyuki Asakura
- Platforms: PlayStation 3 PlayStation 4 PlayStation Vita
- Release: JP: April 3, 2014; NA: September 30, 2014; AU: October 2, 2014; EU: October 3, 2014
- Genre: Tactical role-playing

Natural Doctrine (Japanese: ナチュラル ドクトリン, Hepburn: Nachuraru Dokutorin) is a 2014 tactical role-playing game by Kadokawa Games for the PlayStation 3, PlayStation 4 and PlayStation Vita.

== Gameplay ==
The game is a tactical role-playing game based along the concept of natural selection. The game features single and multiplayer modes with versus and co-operative play, and is cross-play and cross-save compatible.

The game storyline is shown from the perspective of Geoff, the main protagonist, who is accompanied by two women named Vasily and Anka. Combat is based on a turn-based battle system, and a primary concept of gameplay is to have large numbers of allies and enemies simultaneously on a large size battlefield. Time can be controlled dynamically, and units can be controlled in a single space. Units in combat against one another form encampments, where units are able to return to camp at the end of the turn as long as the encampment isn't destroyed. Units are also able to hide behind objects.

Outside of Feste, species such as minotaurs, goblins and orcs set up bases, and intend on attacking from them. The field is wide and arranged within grid limits. In multiplayer mode, players can play as non-human species.

The online mode features a card battle game, where players can compete against one another with their own formulated decks.

== Setting ==
The setting is within a universe where humans fight other races with magic and swords. Within a world of chaos, humans built the fortress city Feste as their home, and fought against other species. The protagonist, Geoff, is a guard soldier set out to clear out goblin dens to grant access to resources important for humankind.

== Development ==
The game was announced at the SCEJA Press Conference in September 2013. It is the first title that is solely developed by Kadokawa. The game was originally intended to be a release title for the PlayStation 4; however, it was delayed twice, to April 2014.

Atsushi Ii, previously known for directing Patapon, led the development team as director. Atsushi Ikariya, responsible for character designs for Fate/Zero, designed the characters alongside ufotable. The producers are Yoshimi Yasuda and Kensuke Tanaka. The game's soundtrack was composed by Noriyuki Asakura, with the ending theme song being an arrangement of "The Court of the Crimson King" by King Crimson.

The game was localised by NIS America for the North American and PAL regional release in Q3 2014.

A major update released on July 10, 2014 added an easy mode to the game, following initial complaints by players in Japan that the game is too difficult. In addition, a more detailed tutorial is introduced, each level has strategy hints included, and the number of save checkpoints has been increased. The player can also speed up the actions of enemies. Three additional online co-op missions were included for all platforms, plus a set of extra hard missions for PlayStation 4 players.

== Reception ==
Reception

Aggregate score
Aggregator	Score		
Aggregator	PS Vita	PS3	PS4
Metacritic	60/100	60/100	53/100

Review scores
Publication	Score		
Publication	PS Vita	PS3	PS4
Destructoid	N/A	N/A	5/10
Electronic Gaming Monthly	N/A	N/A	5/10
Famitsu	30/40	31/40	31/40
Game Informer	N/A	N/A	6.5/10
GameRevolution	N/A	N/A	7/10
GameSpot	N/A	N/A	4/10
Hardcore Gamer	N/A	N/A	3/5
IGN	N/A	N/A	2.8/10
Jeuxvideo.com	13/20	13/20	13/20
PlayStation Official Magazine – Australia	N/A	60%	N/A
Push Square	N/A	N/A	7/10
RPGamer	N/A	N/A	4/5
RPGFan	N/A	N/A	75%
The Digital Fix	N/A	N/A	7/10

The game received "mixed" reviews on all platforms according to the review aggregation website Metacritic. In Japan, Famitsu gave it a score of one seven and three eights for the PlayStation 3 and PlayStation 4 versions, and one six and three eights for the PlayStation Vita version.

Heath Hindman of PlayStation LifeStyle commented that although the mechanics of the Japanese PlayStation 4 import were interesting, the user interface and level design required additional improvement, and the pacing of the game felt slower than it should. Hardcore Gamer called it "punishing, unfair at times and hell-bent on funneling players through a narrow corridor that leaves little-to-no room for tactical experimentation."

The game sold relatively few units within the first week of release in Japan, with only 18,000 physical retail units sold across the three separate platforms that week. As of July 2014, the game sold over 50,000 units across the three platforms.
