= Way of the Samurai 2 =

2003 video game

- Developer: Acquire
- Publishers: JP: Spike; NA/PAL: Capcom
- Director: Tomohiro Tsuchida
- Designer: Kōjirō Endō
- Programmer: Masatoshi Washimi
- Composer: Noriyuki Asakura
- Series: Way of the Samurai
- Platforms: PlayStation 2 PlayStation Portable
- Release: PlayStation 2: JP: October 9, 2003; NA: July 6, 2004; PAL: July 7, 2004; PlayStation Portable: JP: September 3, 2009
- Genre: Action-adventure
- Mode: Single-player

Way of the Samurai 2 (侍道2, Samurai Dou 2) is a PlayStation 2 (PS2) action-adventure game released in 2003. It was re-released on PlayStation Portable in 2009 in Japan.

The game is a prequel to Way of the Samurai.

== Gameplay ==
The game takes place in the late Edo period. The player starts as a starving rōnin who collapsed at the gate of a famous trading island-city called Amahara. Soon thereafter, a little girl shares her riceball with the ronin, giving him (or her, depending on the player's choice) energy. A choice appears, introducing the player to the diverse life of a samurai.

The combat system from the original Way of the Samurai are carried over, albeit with some changes. Amongst them are the inclusion of "stance-breaker" attacks on nearly every weapon, a simplified guard/parry system, and instant kill techniques.

Dojima from the previous game also makes an appearance, though unrelated to the main plot. Here he still serves as a blacksmith to enhance the player's swords. The stats, however, are simplified:

- Attack: Attack strength, determines the amount of damage caused when an opponent is struck with the sword
- Defense: Defensive strength, determines the amount of damage suffered when the player is struck by an opponent
- Durability: Sword strength, increases the amount of tension the sword can generate before breaking.
- Quality: The number of upgrades left that can be performed.

Also, the "Appraise" feature is able to make the swords upgraded more powerful. Their effects include addition to attack, defense, durability, tension resistance, or a combination of the above. These, however, requires certain conditions to be met, such as number of kills. Some special swords are able to be appraised based on their name.

== Reception ==
Reception

Aggregate scores
Aggregator	Score
GameRankings	63.09%
Metacritic	59/100

Review scores
Publication	Score
Edge	6/10
Electronic Gaming Monthly	5.5/10
Eurogamer	4/10
Famitsu	32/40
Game Informer	3.25/10
GamePro	4/5
GameRevolution	D+
GameSpot	6.3/10
GameSpy	3/5
GameZone	6.2/10
IGN	6/10
Official U.S. PlayStation Magazine	3/5
Maxim	4/10
The Times	2/5

Way of the Samurai 2 was met with mixed or average reception upon release, according to review aggregator Metacritic.

Ivan Sulic writing for IGN thought it to be a "poorly laid out, incredibly linear game set within the confines of a seemingly nonlinear space".
