= Shinobido: Way of the Ninja =

2005 video game

- Developer: Acquire
- Publishers: JP: Spike; EU: Sony Computer Entertainment
- Director: Koshi Nakanishi
- Producers: Takuma Endo; Yoichiro Kiyota
- Programmers: Naoki Saegusa; Yoshiaki Arimura; Kouhei Kamata
- Artists: Toshio Koike; Tomohisa Ishikawa
- Writer: Wally Kinoshita
- Composers: Hideki Sakamoto; Keisuke Ito
- Platform: PlayStation 2
- Release: JP: November 10, 2005; PAL: June 30, 2006
- Genre: Stealth
- Mode: Single-player

Shinobido: Way of the Ninja (Note: Shinobidō: Imashime (Japanese: 忍道 戒, Hepburn: Shinobidō: Imashime; "Way of the Shinobi: Commandments") in Japan) is a stealth video game developed by Acquire and published by Spike for the PlayStation 2. It is a spiritual successor to Acquire's previous series Tenchu. It was not released in North America. A follow-up for the PlayStation Portable, Shinobido: Tales of the Ninja was released the same year, with a sequel, Shinobido 2: Revenge of Zen released for the PlayStation Vita in 2011.

== Gameplay ==
Shinobido is a stealth game where the player controls the ninja Goh, nicknamed "The Crow", who conducts various missions and tasks, primarily stealth-based, for one of three warlords competing for Goh's allegiance. Missions include various clandestine operations at the request of the lords, and are delivered by a mysterious individual who shoots a message-carrying arrow into the wall of Goh's shack, the usual method of notification, used throughout the game. These missions may benefit Goh's mission, and their completion or neglect may lead to various ramifications or benefits for future missions and even the story, as lords can be either pleased or angered by the player's actions and act accordingly.

Goh carries little more than a sword. Although Goh is a capable combatant, he will generally be at a disadvantage in a straight sword fight, as his opponents are larger in number and are often more skillfully trained in direct kenjutsu than he is. He must utilize stealth tactics to avoid detection, such as crouching behind ledges and walls, climbing across rooftops, and sneaking through canals to reach the enemy before taking out unsuspecting opponents with a "stealth kill" that often utilizes the environment. If Goh is spotted or heard, the enemy may deflect or prevent the attack. Goh can then carry fallen enemies or allies into shadowy corners, or drop them down wells or into rivers, to prevent the enemy from finding the bodies and sounding a general alert.

Shinobido uses a type of "Ki Meter" similar to the Tenchu series. However, where Tenchu uses a number-based system to judge the distance and awareness of an opponent, Shinobido uses a color-based system to judge the enemy's status. When approaching an opponent or group of opponents, a pair of eyes will appear at the top of the screen, with an individual set of eyes for each enemy within Goh's range.

== Plot ==
=== Story ===
Shinobido has the player take the role of an amnesiac ninja who wakes to find himself lying on the bank of an unfamiliar river. In fact, everything is unfamiliar, as the man finds that he can no longer remember his identity and has no memory of his life or situation up until the point of his regaining consciousness. Finding only a sword lying next to him on the ground, the man stumbles across an isolated and seemingly derelict shack, only to have an arrow shoot past his head and lodge itself into the shack's outer wall. Startled, the man scans the trees and undergrowth surrounding him, but then notices a letter attached to the arrow. The letter states that the person who wrote it is simply a "concerned bystander," and further identifies the amnesiac man as "Goh," a ninja of the Asuka clan, which was wiped out the previous day. The letter informs Goh that his memories and soul have somehow been stolen and placed within eight mystical stones which were scattered during the initial attack on the Asuka ninjas' village, and then further scattered by people who have located and claimed the stones.

Using the run-down hut as a base-of-operations, Goh must locate the stones to reclaim his memory and discover the truth regarding the destruction of the Asuka ninja. However, this monumental task would prove impossible without the assistance of powerful and knowledgeable allies, and Goh is advised by the mysterious writer of the letter to gain the trust and protection of one of three powerful warlords and charismatic leaders within his proximity. Goh is further advised to begin his search in Utakata Castle, where the kind and noble Nobutero Ichijo resides. Ichijo and the Asuka ninja apparently together maintained peace throughout Utakata. With the destruction of the latter, Utakata now appears on the brink of war as ambitious neighbouring warlords and religious leaders turn their attention towards the vulnerable province. Goh must decide whether he will trust Ichijo, or instead ally himself with one of the other leaders vying for control of the region.

== Development ==
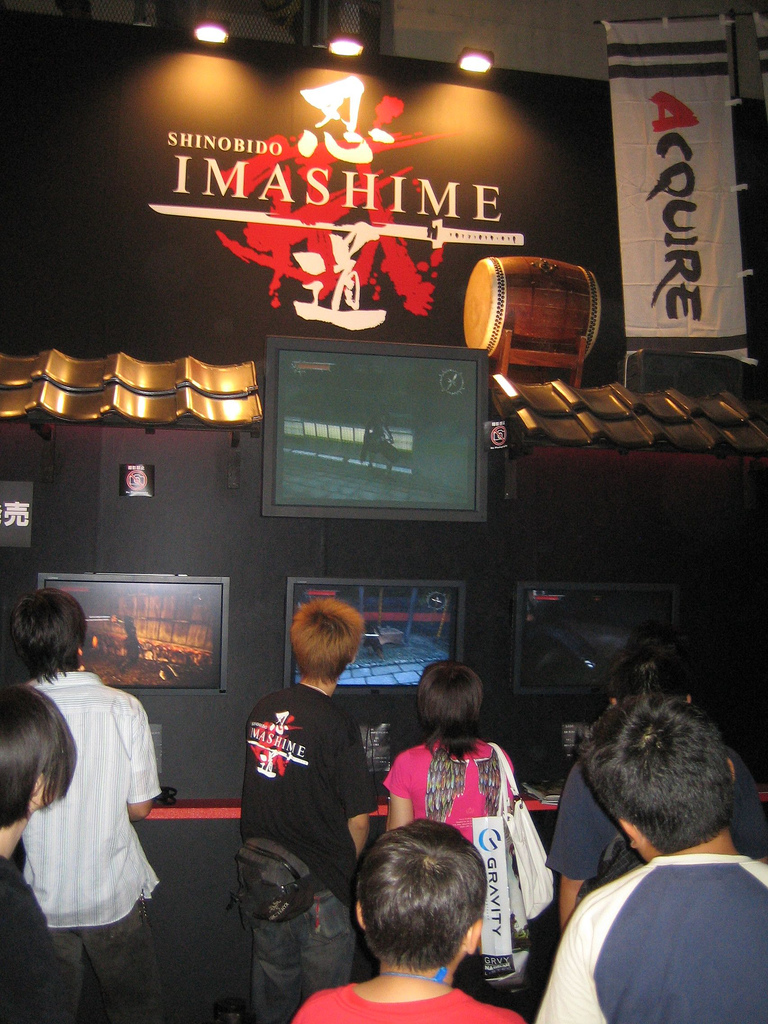
Shinobido: Way of the Ninja being displayed at the 2005 Tokyo Game Show.

After the publishing rights to the Tenchu series was purchased by Activision, Acquire was no longer able to continue developing games in the series so began development on a new series with similar style and gameplay values in an effort to retain its stealth/ninja genre fan base. Spike signed on to fund the game's development in exchange for co-ownership, much like what Acquire did with Sony Music Entertainment Japan for Tenchu.

== Shinobido Takumi expansion pack ==
The game's success in Japan spawned an expansion pack which was released exclusively to the Japanese market. The pack, entitled Shinobido Takumi and released in June 2006, contains 130 fan-made missions which have been judged and selected by the Spike development staff to be the best on offer. The creators of the submitted missions chosen by the development team received in-game credit, a copy of the game and an additional commemorative bonus item.

== Reception ==
Reception

Aggregate score
Aggregator	Score
Metacritic	59/100

Review scores
Publication	Score
Edge	6/10
Eurogamer	7/10
Famitsu	34/40
GamesMaster	55%
GamesTM	6/10
PlayStation Official Magazine – UK	3/10
PALGN	6/10
Play	63%
PSM3	50%
The Sydney Morning Herald	3.5/5
The Times	4/5

The game received "mixed" reviews according to the review aggregation website Metacritic. Critics and reviewers criticised the game's awkward control system, which would at times cause the player to accidentally be noticed by an enemy when attempting a sneak-attack or stealth kill, and also the lack of variety between missions. On the other hand, critics praised the unique story, ragdoll physics and open-ended system which allowed players to choose their allegiance and style of mission, be it stealth or all-out attack. The English language voice acting is described by Boomtown's reviewer as "patchy", adding that "some of it works, most of it doesn't". In Japan, Famitsu gave it a score of one eight, one nine, one eight, and one nine for a total of 34 out of 40.

== Other media ==
Another title in the series, Shinobido: Tales of the Ninja, is available on the PlayStation Portable. Acquire stated and apologized on its official website that, due to circumstances beyond their control, there was no planned North American release. A sequel to the PlayStation Portable game, titled Shinobido 2: Revenge of Zen, was released for the PlayStation Vita.

A female version of Goh appears as a guest character in the 2021 crossover game, Neptunina X Senran Kagura: Ninja Wars / Senran Nin Nin Ninja Taisen Neptune: Shoujo-tachi no Kyouen (閃乱忍忍忍者大戦ネプテューヌ -少女たちの響艶-)
