= Acquire (company) =

Japanese video game developer

Acquire Corp.
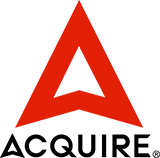
- Native name: 株式会社アクワイア
- Romanized name: Kabushikigaisha Akuwaia
- Type: Subsidiary
- Industry: Video games
- Founded: December 6, 1994; 31 years ago
- Headquarters: Chiyoda, Tokyo, Japan
- Number of locations: 2
- Key people: Takuma Endo (President and CEO)
- Products: Octopath Traveler; Mario & Luigi: Brothership; Tenchu; Way of the Samurai; Akiba's Trip
- Services: Motion capture
- Number of employees: 148 (2024)
- Parent: GungHo Online Entertainment (2011–2024); Kadokawa Corporation (2024-present)
- Website: acquire.co.jp

Acquire Corp. (Japanese: 株式会社アクワイア, Hepburn: Kabushikigaisha Akuwaia) is a Japanese video game developer and publisher, mainly known for the Octopath Traveler, Tenchu, Akiba's Trip, and Way of the Samurai series, along with Mario & Luigi: Brothership.

== History ==
Acquire was founded on December 6, 1994, and in 1998 developed Tenchu: Stealth Assassins for the PlayStation, which turned into a franchise. The developer pushed for a more sandbox approach to the level design, which found its way in other Acquire titles like Way of the Samurai and Shinobido: Way of the Ninja.

In 2011, the company was acquired by GungHo Online Entertainment. The studio co-developed Octopath Traveler with supervision and funding from Square Enix, releasing in 2018. Acquire was chosen as development partner for the game based on their affinity with pixel-art and prior work on the What Did I Do to Deserve This, My Lord? series.

Acquire developed Katana Kami: A Way of the Samurai Story, which released in 2020, following the cancellation of a fifth Way of the Samurai entry.

In 2024, the company was acquired by Kadokawa Corporation.

The studio succeeded AlphaDream, which became defunct on October 1, 2019, as the developer of the Mario & Luigi series, starting with Mario & Luigi: Brothership, which released in 2024.

== Games developed ==
Year	Title	Platform(s)	Notes
1998	Tenchu: Stealth Assassins	PlayStation	
2000	Tenchu 2: Birth of the Stealth Assassins	PlayStation	
2002	Way of the Samurai	PlayStation 2, PlayStation Portable	
2003	Way of the Samurai 2	PlayStation 2, PlayStation Portable	
2005	Samurai Western	PlayStation 2	
2005	Shinobido: Way of the Ninja	PlayStation 2	
2005	Shinobido: Tales of the Ninja	PlayStation Portable	
2006	Kamiwaza	PlayStation 2	
2007	What Did I Do to Deserve This, My Lord?	PlayStation Portable	
2008	Class of Heroes	PlayStation Portable	
2008	What Did I Do To Deserve This, My Lord? 2	PlayStation Portable	
2008	Way of the Samurai 3	PlayStation 3, Xbox 360, Windows	
2009	Tenchu: Shadow Assassins	Wii, PlayStation Portable	
2010	Patchwork Heroes	PlayStation Portable	
2010	No Heroes Allowed!	PlayStation Portable	
2011	Way of the Samurai 4	PlayStation 3, Windows	
2011	Clan of Champions	Windows, PlayStation 3	
2011	Akiba's Trip	PlayStation Portable	
2011	Wizardry: Labyrinth of Lost Souls	PlayStation 3, iOS, PlayStation Vita, Windows	
2011	Shinobido 2: Revenge of Zen	PlayStation Vita	
2012	Orgarythm	PlayStation Vita, Android	Co-developed with Neilo
2012	Sumioni: Demon Arts	PlayStation Vita, Android	
2013	Mind Zero	PlayStation Vita, Windows	Co-developed by ZeroDiv
2013	Divine Gate	Android, iOS	
2013	Rain	PlayStation 3	Co-developed with Japan Studio
2013	Akiba's Trip: Undead & Undressed	PlayStation 3, PlayStation 4, PlayStation Vita, Windows	
2013	No Heroes Allowed: No Puzzles Either!	PlayStation Vita	
2014	Fort Raiders SMAAASH!	Android, iOS	
2015	Aegis of Earth: Protonovus Assault	PlayStation 3, PlayStation 4, PlayStation Vita, Windows	
2016	Akiba's Trip Festa!	Android	Co-developed with DMM Games
2016	Akiba's Beat	PlayStation 4, PlayStation Vita	
2017	No Heroes Allowed! VR	PlayStation 4	
2018	Octopath Traveler	Nintendo Switch, Windows, Stadia, Xbox One, PlayStation 4, PlayStation 5	Co-developed with Square Enix Business Division 11
2020	Katana Kami: A Way of the Samurai Story	Nintendo Switch, PlayStation 4, Windows	
2020	Octopath Traveler: Champions of the Continent	Android, iOS	
2021	Labyrinth of Zangetsu	Nintendo Switch, PlayStation 4, Windows	
2022	Adventure Academia: The Fractured Continent	Nintendo Switch, PlayStation 4, Windows	
2023	Octopath Traveler II	Nintendo Switch, PlayStation 4, PlayStation 5, Windows, Xbox One, Xbox Series X/S	Co-developed with Creative Business Unit II
2023	Xaladia: Rise of the Space Pirates X2	Nintendo Switch, PlayStation 5, Windows	
2024	Ancient Weapon Holly	Nintendo Switch, PlayStation 4, PlayStation 5, Windows	
2024	C.A.R.D.S. RPG: The Misty Battlefield	Nintendo Switch, PlayStation 4, PlayStation 5, Windows	
2024	Scars of Mars	Nintendo Switch, Windows	
2024	Amedama	Nintendo Switch, PlayStation 5, Windows, Xbox Series X/S	Co-developed with IzanagiGames
2024	Hookah Haze	Nintendo Switch, Windows	
2024	Mario & Luigi: Brothership	Nintendo Switch	
2025	All in Abyss: Judge the Fake	Nintendo Switch, PlayStation 5, Windows	Co-developed with WSS playground
2025	Class of Heroes 3: Remaster	Nintendo Switch, PlayStation 5, Windows	
2027	Yakoh Shinobi Ops	PlayStation 5, Windows	
TBA	Black Finger JET	Windows	Co-developed with Kohachi Studio and Red Dunes Games
TBA	Monster Eater	Windows	
TBA	Hamrazu:Re	Windows	
