= Shinobido 2: Revenge of Zen =

2011 video game

- North American version cover art
- Developer: Acquire
- Publishers: JP: Spike; WW: Namco Bandai Games
- Director: Yasuhiro Abe
- Programmer: Tomonori Imura
- Writer: Tadashi Satomi
- Composer: Toshiko Tasaki
- Platform: PlayStation Vita
- Release: JP: December 17, 2011; NA: February 21, 2012; EU: February 22, 2012; AU: February 23, 2012
- Genre: Stealth
- Mode: Single-player

Shinobido 2: Revenge of Zen, known in Japan as Shinobidō 2: Sange (忍道2 散華), is a stealth video game developed by Acquire and published by Spike for the PlayStation Vita. Namco Bandai Games released the game outside Japan. It is a sequel to Shinobido: Way of the Ninja. A downloadable content pack, Mirror Spirits, was released on May 9, 2012. The game, along with its DLC, was removed from the PSN Store in 2016, most likely due to the license expiring from Bandai Namco in North America and the PAL region.

== Gameplay ==
Players take the role of one of the two main characters, Zen and Kaede. The main town features various menus. Some allow players to equip ninja tools such as caltrops, mines, shurikens, potions, smoke bombs, etc., while others let them accept missions from the three primary daimyou. As they progress through the story, players have the choice of which daimyou they want to help, and they are encouraged to only help that daimyou, encouraging three separate playthroughs. The daimyou issue various missions such as assassinating a certain target, protecting a shipping crate with supplies, freeing captive peasants, or stealing resources. Once a mission is selected, players are dropped into a map filled with enemies and treasures to collect. They must utilize stealth and a variety of skills such as a grapple hook, silent assassinations, counter attacks, etc., in order to complete their objective. Once they level up, they can put attribute points into max health, attack, defense, an extended special attack meter that allows for the Zankoku attack (a teleporting silent kill), and a longer grapple hook. Along the way, players will encounter various bosses, such as enemy ninja clan leaders, and eventually the other daimyou themselves. Players can utilize items to weaken their foes or try to lure them into a silent kill, allowing for a wide variety of play-styles.

== Plot ==
Set six months after the events of the previous game, Shinobido 2 sees the once peaceful region of Utakata in the grip of a vicious civil war. Players step into the shoes of Zen, betrayed by his companions and left fatally wounded. San, the love of his life, was killed by his two childhood friends, Shu and Nagi.

== Reception ==
Reception

Aggregate score
| Aggregator | Score |
|---|---|
| Metacritic | 55/100 |

Review scores
| Publication | Score |
|---|---|
| Destructoid | 6/10 |
| Eurogamer | 7/10 |
| Famitsu | 31/40 |
| Game Informer | 6.25/10 |
| GameRevolution | 3.5/5 |
| GameSpot | 3.5/10 |
| GameTrailers | 7.3/10 |
| GameZone | 3.5/10 |
| IGN | 4.5/10 |
| PlayStation: The Official Magazine | 5/10 |

The game received "mixed" reviews according to the review aggregation website Metacritic. In Japan, Famitsu gave it a score of three eights and one seven for a total of 31 out of 40.

PlayStation LifeStyle's overall positive review noted its cult appeal as the reviewer had plenty of praise, calling it "a fun stealth game with tons of depth."
