= Way of the Samurai =

2002 video game

- North American cover art
- Developer: Acquire
- Publishers: JP: Spike; NA: BAM! Entertainment; PAL: Eidos Interactive
- Director: Koshi Nakanishi
- Designer: Haruyuki Ohashi
- Writers: Hiroaki Mirua; Shogo Sakamoto
- Composer: Noriyuki Asakura
- Platforms: PlayStation 2, PlayStation Portable
- Release: PlayStation 2: JP: February 7, 2002; NA: May 30, 2002; PAL: September 13, 2002; Kanzenban: JP: January 16, 2003; PlayStation Portable: JP: September 18, 2008
- Genres: Action-adventure, action role-playing
- Modes: Single-player, multiplayer

Way of the Samurai, known in Japan as Samurai (侍), is a PlayStation 2 action-adventure game developed by Acquire and released in 2002.

Set in 19th century Japan, the player takes on the role of a rōnin who wanders into a remote village and becomes involved in a conflict between rival clans. A notable feature of the game is the branching storyline, which allows player decisions to radically alter the course of the story.

An updated version titled Samurai Kanzenban (侍〜完全版〜, Samurai Complete Edition) was released in Japan in 2003. It was based on the Western versions of the game, and as such, it included the non-sword weapons, bugfixes, the exit for ending the game early, hard mode, and horizontal text of those versions. The game was followed by three sequels. Way of the Samurai was also released on PlayStation Portable under the name Samurai Dō Portable (侍道ポータブル, Samurai Dō Pōtaburu) on September 18, 2008 in Japan, prior to the release of Way of the Samurai 3.

== Gameplay ==
Aside from the player's direct involvement in choosing the plot, gameplay in Way of the Samurai focuses heavily on combat. Fighting is done almost entirely with various samurai swords available in the game. Way of the Samurai features over 40 different types of swords, however the player begins with access to only one. By defeating enemies, the player can then take the fallen character's sword to add to his or her own inventory. The player may only carry a maximum of three swords at a time. Once per game, the player may leave one additional sword with the swordsmith, Dojima, and have it delivered to his or her sword collection.

=== Combat ===
The player will often have the choice of whether or not to engage in combat with a specific non-player character, however once combat is engaged the player is likely to be forced into fighting several opponents at once.

Kenji has a basic set of moves that are available with all weapons, consisting of a regular attack, a strong attack, a block, and a kick. There are numerous variations and combinations of the basic moves available depending on the particular sword equipped at the time. By defeating opponents or collecting special items Kenji can also unlock special attacks and combinations specific to each weapon. There are also several different fighting stances, depending on the particular sword equipped, each of which comes with its own fighting style.

This is the only installment in the series so far that offers a versus mode for two players.

=== Sword enhancement ===
Each of the swords available in the game has several attributes which influence its effectiveness in battle. These attributes can be enhanced using special items found, or by visiting the in-game swordsmith.

- Sharpness: Attack strength, increases/decreases the amount of damage caused when an opponent is struck with the sword
- Flexibility: Defensive strength, increases/decreases the amount of damage suffered when the player is struck by an opponent
- Durability: Sword strength, increases the amount of heat the sword can generate before breaking (heat is generated by striking or blocking, and displayed using an on-screen meter)
- Life: Increases/decreases the total number of the players hit points.

== Plot ==
The story of Way of the Samurai takes place in 1878, after the fall of the Tokugawa shogunate and the start of the Meiji period, during the Satsuma Rebellion, a time when the samurai who were once at the top of Japanese society are all but outlawed. The game begins with the player, taking the role of a wandering rōnin by the name of Kenji, arriving in a fictional outpost called Rokkotsu Pass.

Rokkotsu Pass is a sparsely populated village, whose main attractions include a railway crossing, a small restaurant, and an iron foundry. Three separate factions are competing for control of the Pass, each with their own agenda. The first is the new centralized government, whose army has been sweeping through the country securing power from the local warlords. The government army is well-funded and equipped with modern weaponry, including firearms and cannons, making them formidable opponents for the former samurai lords.

The second faction is the Kurou family, who previously held sway in Rokkotsu Pass and continue to exert their influence on the people through extortion and intimidation. Led by Tesshin Kurou, the family is resisting the government's attempt to take control of the pass, however the samurai cannot compete with the modern army. In an attempt to secure funds, the Kurou intend to sell the iron foundry to the government.

This decision by the Kurou puts them in direct opposition to the Akadama clan, whose leader, Kitcho, is the illegitimate son of Tesshin Kurou. The Akadama wish to expel the government forces from the pass, and plan to sabotage the Kurou family's attempt to sell the foundry.

Caught in the middle of this power struggle are the village peasants, who are likely to be oppressed regardless of who is in control.

=== Branching plot ===
Although the story in Way of the Samurai follows the basic framework provided above, the actual events that the player participates in depend greatly on the decisions made while playing. Immediately upon entering Rokkotsu Pass, the player is confronted by a group of samurai attempting to kidnap a young girl. The player has the choice of helping the girl, joining the abductors, or ignoring the situation altogether. Each of these decisions will lead the player down a different path, resulting in a vastly different view of the main plot points.

The player's decisions will also have a direct result on Kenji's allegiance within the storyline. The player may choose to join either the Kurou family or the Akadama clan, to support and protect the innocent villagers, or to take no side and observe the events as an outsider with minimal direct involvement. The player may also choose to help one faction and then switch allegiance later in the game.

As a result of these branching storylines, Way of the Samurai has six different endings; the particular ending obtained by the player is based on which faction, if any, Kenji has allied himself with and the actions taken during the course of the game.

== Reception ==
Reception

Aggregate score
Aggregator	Score
Metacritic	74/100

Review scores
Publication	Score
Edge	6/10
Electronic Gaming Monthly	7/10
Eurogamer	7/10
Famitsu	31/40
Game Informer	7.5/10
GamePro	4.5/5
GameSpot	7.1/10
GameSpy	82%
GameZone	8.5/10
IGN	7.8/10
Official U.S. PlayStation Magazine	3.5/5

The game received "mixed or average" reviews according to the review aggregation website Metacritic. In Japan, Famitsu gave it a score of 31 out of 40.
