= Hiro Shimono =

Japanese voice actor and singer

- 下野 紘
- Born: April 21, 1980 (age 46); Tokyo, Japan
- Occupations: Voice actor; singer
- Years active: 2001–present
- Agent: I'm Enterprise
- Children: 2
- Website: shimonohiro.com

Hiro Shimono (下野 紘, Shimono Hiro; born April 21, 1980) is a Japanese voice actor and singer affiliated with I'm Enterprise. His notable roles include Connie Springer in Attack on Titan, Shinichi Handa in Inazuma Eleven, Ayato Kamina in RahXephon, Akihisa Yoshii in Baka and Test, Haruka Kasugano in Yosuga no Sora, Keima Katsuragi in The World God Only Knows, Syo Kurusu in the Uta no Prince-sama series, Nai in Karneval, Hanzō Urushihara in The Devil Is a Part-Timer!, Norifumi Kawakami in Ace of Diamond, Dabi in My Hero Academia, Rex in Xenoblade Chronicles 2, Zenitsu Agatsuma in Demon Slayer: Kimetsu no Yaiba, Nacht Faust in Black Clover, Ryunosuke Naruhodo in The Great Ace Attorney: Adventures, Rindou Haitani in Tokyo Revengers, adult Kozuki Momonosuke in One Piece, and Nabiiyu in Princession Orchestra.

== Personal life ==
On July 2, 2021, it was announced that Shimono had tested positive for COVID-19 and was undergoing treatment. On July 12, 2021, it was announced that Shimono had recovered and would resume activities.

Shimono is married and has two children.

== Filmography ==
=== TV anime ===
2002

- RahXephon – Ayato Kamina

2003

- Bobobo-bo Bo-bobo – Shibito
- Kaleido Star – Ken Robbins
- Gunparade March – Daisuke Akane

2004

- Melody of Oblivion – Eran Vitāru
- Sgt. Frog – Masayoshi Yoshiokadaira
- Uta-Kata – Rin

2005

- Cluster Edge – Agate Fluorite
- Fushigi Boshi no Futago Hime – Bānā, Aurā
- Hell Girl – Yuji Numata
- Solty Rei – Yūto K. Steel

2006

- D.Gray-Man – Shifu

2007

- Ef: A Tale of Memories. – Hiro Hirono
- Ghost Hunt – Tomoaki Sakauchi
- Nagasarete Airantō – Ikuto Tōhōin
- Ōkiku Furikabutte – Yūichirō Tajima
- Sketchbook ~full color's~ – Daichi Negishi
- Tokyo Majin Gakuen Kenpuchō: Tō – Tatsuma Hiyuu

2008

- Ef: A Tale of Melodies. – Hiro Hirono
- Inazuma Eleven – Shinichi Handa, Fideo Ardena
- Kannagi – Jin Mikuriya
- Soul Eater – Hiro, Masamune Nakatsukasa (young)
- Special A – Tadashi Karino

2009

- Asura Cryin' – Takuma Higuchi
- Basquash! – Dan JD

2010

- Baka to Test to Shōkanjū – Akihisa Yoshii
- Detective Conan – Moriwaki Minoru (Ep.566)
- Mitsudomoe – Satoshi Yabe
- Fairy Tail – Sho
- Mobile Suit Gundam Unicorn – Takuya Irei
- Nurarihyon no Mago – Kuromaru
- SD Gundam Sangokuden Brave Battle Warriors – Rikuson Zetaplus
- Tantei Opera Milky Holmes – Rat
- The World God Only Knows – Keima Katsuragi
- Yosuga no Sora – Haruka Kasugano
- Kotoura-san – Daichi Muroto

2011

- Appleseed XIII – Yoshitsune
- Baka to Test to Shōkanjū: Ni! – Akihisa Yoshii
- Ben-To – Yō Satō
- Dragon Crisis! – Ryuuji Kisaragi
- Oretachi ni Tsubasa wa Nai – Takashi Haneda
- 30-sai no Hoken Taiiku – Hayao Imagawa
- Sket Dance – Sasuke Tsubaki
- The World God Only Knows II – Keima Katsuragi
- Uta no Prince-sama Maji Love 1000% (Season 1) – Syo Kurusu

2012

- Aoi Sekai no Chūshin de – Tejirof
- Binbō-gami ga! – Momoo Inugami
- So, I Can't Play H! – Ryōsuke Kaga
- Danball Senki– Hiro Oozora
- Kuroko's Basketball – Yūsuke Tanimura
- Sket Dance – Sasuke Tsubaki
- Tamako Market – Mechya Mochimazzi

2013

- Ace of Diamond – Kawakami Norifumi
- Attack on Titan – Connie Springer
- GJ Club – Kyōya Shinomiya
- Karneval – Nai
- Kotoura-san – Daichi Muroto
- Log Horizon – Sojiro Seta
- Senyu – Alba
- The Devil Is a Part-Timer! – Hanzō Urushihara/Lucifer
- The World God Only Knows: Goddesses Arc – Keima Katsuragi
- Uta no Prince-sama Maji Love 2000% (Season 2) – Syo Kurusu
- Unbreakable Machine-Doll – Raishin Akabane
- Tokyo Ravens – Tenma Momoe

2014

- Akatsuki no Yona – Zeno
- Baby Steps – Yukichi Fukasawa
- Battle Spirits: Saikyou Ginga Ultimate Zero – Miroku
- Crayon Shin Chan – Rui
- Donten ni Warau – Rakuchō Takeda
- Gakumon! School of Monsters – Juzu
- Mysterious Joker – Spade
- Magimoji Rurumo – Nishino
- Nobunaga the Fool – Brutus
- Noragami – Shimeji
- The Pilot's Love Song – Noriaki Kashiwabara
- Tonari no Seki-kun – Toshinari Seki
- Wake Up, Girls! – Kuniyoshi Ōta
- Z/X Ignition – Asuka Tennōji

2015

- Ame-iro Cocoa – Aoi Tokura
- Attack on Titan: Junior High – Connie Springer
- Baby Steps Season 2 – Yukichi Fukasawa
- Durarara!!×2 – Aoba Kuronuma
- Etotama – Takeru Amato
- Jitsu wa Watashi wa – Yūta Shimada
- Junjou Romantica season 3 – Shiiba Mizuki
- K: Return of Kings – Kotosaka, Ryuho Camo
- Kamisama Kiss 2 – Yatori
- Tokyo Ghoul √A – Naki
- Uta no Prince-sama Maji Love Revolutions (Season 3) – Syo Kurusu

2016

- Berserk – Isidro
- Days – Jiro Haibara
- Joker Game – Miyoshi
- Kamiwaza Wanda – Masato Kurosaki
- Myriad Colors Phantom World – Haruhiko Ichijō
- Norn9 – Senri Ichinose
- Prince of Stride: Alternative – Ayumu Kadowaki
- Servamp – Misono Arisuin
- Scared Rider Xechs – Hiro Kurama
- Mobile Suit Gundam Unicorn RE:0096 – Takuya Irei
- Uta no Prince-sama Maji LOVE Legend Star (Season 4) – Syo Kurusu
- WWW.Working!! – Takuya Kōno
- Twin Star Exorcists – Tenma Unomiya

2017

- Attack on Titan Season 2 – Connie Springer
- Berserk Season 2 – Isidro
- ACCA: 13-Territory Inspection Dept. – Jean Otus
- Yowamushi Pedal: New Generation – Issa Kaburagi
- Sakura Quest – Takashi Yamada
- Tsurezure Children – Takao Yamane
- Kaito × Answer – Q Buster Head
- Dive!! – Chikuwa, Takada
- Restaurant to Another World – Sirius Alfade
- My Hero Academia 2 – Dabi
- Wake Up, Girls! Shin Shou – Kuniyoshi Ōta
- Altair: A Record of Battles – Erbach

2018

- Attack on Titan Season 3 – Connie Springer
- Tada Never Falls in Love – Gentarō Yamashita
- Junji Ito Collection – Tōru Oshikiri, Kōta Kawai, Sugio
- Yowamushi Pedal: Glory Line – Issa Kaburagi
- Pop Team Epic – Popuko (episode 6-B)
- Devils' Line – Shōta Akimura
- My Hero Academia 3 – Dabi
- Nil Admirari no Tenbin: Teito Genwaku Kitan – Narration, Shinnosuk
- Tokyo Ghoul:re – Naki
- Dances with the Dragons – Īgī Dorie
- Record of Grancrest War – Selge Constance
- Gurazeni – Haruhiko
- 100 Sleeping Princes and the Kingdom of Dreams – Schnee
- Boarding School Juliet – Eigo Kohitsuji
- Dakaichi – Tomo-kun

2019

- The Morose Mononokean II – Shihou
- My Roommate Is a Cat – Atsushi Kawase
- Demon Slayer: Kimetsu no Yaiba – Zenitsu Agatsuma
- My Hero Academia 4 – Dabi, Wash
- Hensuki – Keiki Kiryū
- Isekai Cheat Magician – Kasim
- High School Prodigies Have It Easy Even In Another World – Elch
- African Office Worker – Ōhashi (Toucan)
- Special 7: Special Crime Investigation Unit – Seiji "Rookie" Nanatsuki
- Phantasy Star Online 2: Episode Oracle – Afin
- Ace of Diamond act II – Kawakami Norifumi

2020

- The 8th Son? Are You Kidding Me? – Erwin von Alnim
- Dorohedoro – Insect Sorcerer
- Dragon Quest: The Adventure of Dai – Deroline
- Listeners – Hole
- Peter Grill and the Philosopher's Time – Peter Grill
- Talentless Nana – Nanao Nakajima
- Sleepy Princess in the Demon Castle – The Hero Akatsuki
- Attack on Titan Final Season – Connie Springer

2021

- Attack on Titan Final Season – Connie Springer
- Kemono Jihen – Nobimaru
- Log Horizon: Destruction of the Round Table – Sojiro Seta
- I-Chu: Halfway Through the Idol – Eva Armstrong
- Black Clover – Nacht Faust
- My Hero Academia 5 – Dabi, Wash
- Backflip!! – Nagayoshi Onagawa
- Zombie Land Saga Revenge – Committee Member (Episode 7)
- The Dungeon of Black Company – Wanibe
- Miss Kobayashi's Dragon Maid S – Taketo Aida
- Tokyo Revengers – Rindo Haitani
- The Fruit of Evolution – Seiichi Hiiragi
- Deep Insanity: The Lost Child – Shigure Daniel Kai/Dan Sohn Key
- Demon Slayer: Kimetsu no Yaiba – Entertainment District Arc – Zenitsu Agatsuma

2022

- Love of Kill – Son Ryang-ha
- Orient – Shirō Inukai
- Doraemon – Moteo Mote
- Pokémon Ultimate Journeys: The Series – Piers
- Shikimori's Not Just a Cutie – Fuji Shikimori
- RWBY: Ice Queendom – Jaune Arc
- My Stepmom's Daughter Is My Ex – Mizuto Irido
- The Devil Is a Part-Timer!! – Hanzō Urushihara/Lucifer
- Peter Grill and the Philosopher's Time: Super Extra – Peter Grill
- My Hero Academia 6 – Dabi, Wash

2023

- By the Grace of the Gods Season 2 – Tony
- One Piece – Kozuki Momonosuke (adult)
- The Fruit of Evolution 2 – Seiichi Hiiragi
- Blue Lock – Julian Loki
- Demon Slayer: Kimetsu no Yaiba – Swordsmith Village Arc – Zenitsu Agatsuma
- Chibi Godzilla Raids Again – Chibi Rodan
- The Marginal Service – Cyrus N. Kuga
- Level 1 Demon Lord and One Room Hero – Leo
- My Happy Marriage – Yoshito Godō
- Undead Girl Murder Farce – Phantom
- The Most Heretical Last Boss Queen – Alan
- My Unique Skill Makes Me OP Even at Level 1 – Neptune
- My New Boss Is Goofy – Hakutō
- Tokyo Revengers: Tenjiku Arc – Rindo Haitani
- My Daughter Left the Nest and Returned an S-Rank Adventurer – Schwartz

2024

- My Instant Death Ability Is So Overpowered – Daimon Hanakawa
- Doctor Elise – Chris De Clorance
- My Hero Academia 7 – Dabi
- Delico's Nursery – Henrique Lorca
- Grendizer U – Koji Kabuto
- The Magical Girl and the Evil Lieutenant Used to Be Archenemies – Alcyone
- Haigakura – Ransaiwa
- Shy Season 2 – Tokimaru

2025

- Farmagia – Emero
- Toilet-Bound Hanako-kun – Kosuke Tennoji
- #Compass 2.0: Combat Providence Analysis System – Marcos '55
- Everyday Host – Kōichi
- Princession Orchestra – Nabiiyu
- New Saga – Seran
- Witch Watch – Sagiri Kusama
- Gachiakuta – Fu
- My Hero Academia: Final Season – Dabi

2026

- Mao – Hyakka
- So What's Wrong with Getting Reborn as a Goblin? – Izuiizu
- A Witch's Life in Mongol - Ögedei Khan

2027

- The Reincarnated Elf Left on a Journey to Master His Magic – Gallius

=== Original net animation (ONA) ===
- Sword Gai (2018) - Marcus Lithos
- JoJo's Bizarre Adventure: Stone Ocean (2022) – Guccio
- Romantic Killer (2022) – Makoto Oda
- Junji Ito Maniac: Japanese Tales of the Macabre (2023) – Oshikiri
- Akuma-kun (2023) – Strophaia
- Scott Pilgrim Takes Off (2023) – Scott Pilgrim
- Terminator Zero (2024) – Kenta

=== Original video animation (OVA) ===
- Baka to Test to Shōkanjū: Matsuri – Akihisa Yoshii
- Corpse Party: Missing Footage – Satoshi Mochida
- Corpse Party: Tortured Souls – Satoshi Mochida
- Cyborg 009 Vs. Devilman – Cyborg 0018/Seth
- GJ Club@ – Kyōya Shinomiya
- Isekai no Seikishi Monogatari – Kenshi Masaki
- Love Pistols – Tsuburaya Norio
- Megane na Kanojo – Tatsuya Takatsuka
- Memories Off 3.5: Omoide no Kanata he – Shōgo Kaga
- Noragami – Shimeji
- Saint Seiya: The Lost Canvas – Alone/Hades
- Soul Worker: Your Destiny Awaits – Erwin Arclight
- Tsubasa Tokyo Revelations – Subaru
- The World God Only Knows – Keima Katsuragi
- Yona of the Dawn – Zeno

=== Theatrical animation ===
- RahXephon: Pluralitas Concentio (2003) – Ayato Kamina
- Cencoroll (2009) – Tetsu
- Inazuma Eleven: Saikyō Gundan Ōga Shūrai (2010) – Shinichi Handa
- Inazuma Eleven GO vs. Danbōru Senki W (2012) – Hiro Ōzora
- K: Missing Kings (2014) – Kotosaka
- Tantei Opera Milky Holmes: Gyakushū no Milky Holmes (2015) – Rat
- Yowamushi Pedal Re:Generation (2017) – Issa Kaburagi
- Servamp -Alice in the Garden- (2018) – Misono Alicein
- Uta no Prince-sama Maji LOVE Kingdom (2019) – Syo Kurusu
- Cencoroll Connect (2019) – Tetsu
- My Hero Academia: Heroes Rising (2019) – Dabi
- Demon Slayer: Kimetsu no Yaiba – The Movie: Mugen Train (2020) – Zenitsu Agatsuma
- Mortal Kombat Legends: Scorpion's Revenge (2020) – Liu Kang (Japanese dub)
- Fortune Favors Lady Nikuko (2021) – Lizard, Gecko
- Backflip!! (2022) – Nagayoshi Onagawa
- Uta no Prince-sama: Maji Love ST☆RISH Tours (2022) – Syo Kurusu
- Mobile Suit Gundam SEED Freedom (2024) – Orphee Lam Tao
- Demon Slayer: Kimetsu no Yaiba – The Movie: Infinity Castle (2025) – Zenitsu Agatsuma

=== Video games ===
- 13 Sentinels: Aegis Rim – Juro Kurabe
- 7th Dragon 2020 – Unit 13
- Alchemy Stars – Jomu and Brock
- Another Eden – Serge
- Aquakids – Rei
- Arena of Valor – Slimz (Japanese Server), Zenitsu Agatsuma (Demon Slayer Collab)
- Aria The Natural: Tooi Yume no Mirage – Protagonist
- Atelier Lilie: Salburg's Alchemist 3 – Theo Mohnmeier
- Beast Master & Prince – Lucia
- Black Wolves Saga: Bloody Nightmare – Richie
- Black Wolves Saga: Last Hope – Richie
- Buried Stars – Hyesung Seo
- Corpse Party: Blood Covered Repeated Fear – Satoshi Mochida
- Corpse Party: Blood Drive – Satoshi Mochida
- Corpse Party: Book of Shadows – Satoshi Mochida
- Chaos Rings – Zhamo
- Cherry Blossom – Satsuki Ouse
- D→A: White – Tōya Shinjō
- Danganronpa V3: Killing Harmony – Kokichi Ouma
- Disgaea 2: Cursed Memories – Taro, Prism Red
- Disgaea 3 – Almaz fon Almadine Adamant
- Dissidia Final Fantasy Opera Omnia – Ceodore
- Engage Wars – James Katsumoto
- Eternal Sonata – Allegretto
- Eureka Seven: TR1: New Wave – Sumner Sturgeon
- Final Fantasy XIII – Orphan
- Fire Emblem Engage – Alear (male)
- Food Fantasy – Pizza
- Genshin Impact – Lyney
- Gloria Union – Ishut, Ashley
- God Eater Resonant Ops – Male Protagonist (Leo Kamiki)
- Grand Chase: Dimensional Chaser – Ryan
- Hana Yori Dango: Koi Seyo Otome! – Kazuya Aoike
- Hi-Fi Rush – Chai
- Home Sweet Home – Tim
- Hyakka Hyakurō: Sengoku Ninpōchō – Kuroyuki
- Icey – Narrator
- I-Chu – Eva Armstrong
- Ikemen Revolution: Alice and Love Magic – Ray Blackwell
- Issho ni Gohan – Yosuke Toriyama
- Jojo's Bizarre Adventure: All Star Battle – Secco
- Last Escort 2 – Reiji
- League of Legends – Yone
- Moujuutsukai to Oujisama – Lucia
- NORN9 – Ichinose Senri
- Phantasy Star Online 2 – Afin, Ohza
- Phantom Brave – Ash
- Project X Zone – Zephyr
- Project X Zone 2 – Zephyr
- RahXephon: Sōkyū Gensōkyoku – Ayato Kamina
- Resonance of Fate – Zephyr
- Rune Factory 4 – Kiel
- Seishun Hajimemashita! – Kaoru Kasugame
- Shadow Hearts 2 – Kurando Inugami
- Shikigami no Shiro: Nanayozuki Gensōkyoku – Rei Kanan
- Shin Megami Tensei IV: Apocalypse – Protagonist
- Shinobi, Koi Utsutsu – Garaiya
- Shōjo Yoshitsuneden – Benkei Musashibō
- Soul Worker: Your Destiny Awaits – Erwin Arclight
- Star Ocean 5: Integrity and Faithlessness – Ted
- Super Robot Wars MX – Ayato Kamina
- Super Heroine Chronicle – Claude
- Super Smash Bros. Ultimate – Rex
- Tales of Symphonia: Dawn of the New World – Emil Castagnier
- Tales of the World: Radiant Mythology 3 – Emil Castagnier
- Tartaros – Soma
- Teikoku Sensenki – Shu Hishin
- The Adventures of Elliot: The Millennium Tales – Euygene
- The Great Ace Attorney: Adventures – Ryunosuke Naruhodo
- The Great Ace Attorney 2: Resolve – Ryunosuke Naruhodo
- The Last Story – Yuris
- The Thousand Musketeers – Kirch
- Touken Ranbu – Hakusan Yoshimitsu
- Tower of Fantasy – Male Protagonist
- Uta no Prince-sama – Syo Kurusu
- Uta no Prince-sama Repeat – Syo Kurusu
- Uta no Prince-sama Sweet Serenade – Syo Kurusu
- Uta no Prince-sama Amazing Aria – Syo Kurusu
- Uta no Prince-sama All Star – Syo Kurusu
- Uta no Prince-sama All Star After Secret – Syo Kurusu
- Valkyrie Connect – Trickster God Loki
- Warriors Orochi 4 – Perseus (Loki)
- Wild Arms 5 – Dean Stark
- Xenoblade Chronicles 2 – Rex
- Xenoblade Chronicles 3: Future Redeemed – Rex
- Ys IX: Monstrum Nox – Jules, Renegade
- Zack & Wiki: Quest for Barbaros' Treasure – Zack

=== Radio ===
- Voice Crew, Kaori Mizuhashi's 12th Century personality
- Radio Misty with Yūki Kaji
- Kimetsu Radio with Natsuki Hanae
- Attack on Titan Radio

=== Drama CDs ===
- -8 (Minus Eight) – Tonami Otohiko
- Ai no Fukasa wa Hizakurai – Subaru Sakashita
- Alice=Alice – King
- Alice's Adventures in Wonderland – The Hatter
- Beauty Pop – Kei Minami
- Bokura no Unsei: Seifuku to Anata – Sugiura
- Brother Shuffle! – as Mafuyu Sakurai
- Chrome Shelled Regios – Layfon Wolfstein Alseif
- Corpse Party – Satoshi Mochida
- Egoist Prince – Rolf's help boy
- Eien no Shichigatsu – Ryuusuke Saitou
- Heart Supplement Series – (Sunday) Hinata
- Like a Butterfly – Ryōsuke Takaya
- Honoka na Koi no Danpen o – Toranosuke
- Honto Yajuu – Yamase
- Junk!Boys – Ayame Suhara
- Karneval – Nai
- Kindan Vampire 2 – Mateus von Weiseheldenburg
- Kotoba Nante Iranai – Takumi Sahara
- Kyoudai no Jijou – Juri Mizuhashi
- Love Neko – Mimio
- Maid-sama – Shouichiro Yukimura
- Mo Dao Zu Shi/Ma Dou So Shi – Lan Jingyi/Ran Keigi
- Norn9 – Senri
- Oz to Himitsu no Ai – The third key: Keisa
- Saint Seiya Episode.G – Leo Aiolia
- Shimekiri no Sono Mae ni!? – Tomohisa Tsutsugi
- Shinsengumi Mokuhiroku Wasurenagusa Vol.4 – Toudou Heisuke
- Soubou Sangokushi – Riku Son (Lu Xun)
- Storm Lover 2nd – Isuzu Kazuhisa
- Teikoku Sensenki – Shu Hishin
- Toriai Kyoudai – Gyoto Ashikawa
- Tsuki ni Ookami – Tsukishiro
- Ubu Kare – Taiki
- Wagamama dakedo Itoshikute – Shūji Adachi
- Yatamomo – Momo
- Yosei Gakuen Feararuka - Futago no Sylph ni Goyojin- – Tooru
- Secret XXX – Shouhei Ikushima

=== Live-action films ===
- Chronos Jaunter no Densetsu (2019), Kazuhiko Suihara
- Yokaipedia (2022), Ittan-momen (voice)

=== Voice/movie comics ===
- Hetakoi – Shizuka Komai
- Shitsuren Chocolatier – Sōta Koyurugi

=== Dubbing ===
==== Live-action ====
- Alex Rider – Tom Harris (Brenock O'Connor)
- Barbie – Allan (Michael Cera)
- Bones – Clinton Gilmore
- Chloe – Michael Stewart
- The Contract – Chris Keene
- CSI: Crime Scene Investigation episode "Field Mice" – Guillermo Seidel
- The Dust Factory – Ryan Flynn (Ryan Kelley)
- The Fast and the Furious: Tokyo Drift (2025 The Cinema edition) – Earl (Jason Tobin)
- F9 – Earl (Jason Tobin)
- Famous in Love – Jake Salt
- Game Shakers – Hudson Gimble
- Goodbye Christopher Robin – Older Christopher Robin Milne (Alex Lawther)
- Hannah Montana episode "My Best Friend's Boyfriend" – Lucas
- High Strung – Johnnie Blackwell (Nicholas Galitzine)
- IF – Steven (Keegan-Michael Key)
- Monsters: The Lyle and Erik Menendez Story - Lyle Menendez (Nicholas Alexander Chavez)
- Mortal Engines – Bevis Pod (Ronan Raftery)
- Real – Jang Tae-yeong (Kim Soo-hyun)
- Resident Evil – Bryan (Austin Abrams)
- Superman – Jimmy Olsen (Skyler Gisondo)
- Twisters – Boone (Brandon Perea)

==== Animation ====
- Exchange Student Zero – Hiro
- The Garfield Movie – Snickers
- Zootopia 2 – Gary De'Snake

== Discography ==
=== Singles ===
Year	EP details	Catalog No.	Peak Oricon chart positions
2016	Real: Released: March 16, 2016; Label: Pony Canyon; Format: CD	PCCG-01514 (Limited Edition), PCCG-70311 (Regular Edition)	4 (weekly chart)
2016	One Chance: Released: September 13, 2016; Label: Pony Canyon; Format: CD	PCCG-01540 (Limited Edition), PCCG-01541 (Regular Edition)	9 (weekly chart)
2017	Running High: Released: April 19, 2017; Label: Pony Canyon; Format: CD	PCCG-01589 (Limited Edition), PCCG-70365 (Regular Edition)	11 (weekly chart)
2019	Soul Flag: Released: October 23, 2019; Label: Pony Canyon; Format: CD		12 (weekly chart)
