= Book of Shadows (disambiguation) =

A Book of Shadows is a book containing religious text and instructions for magical rituals found within the neopagan religion of Wicca.

Book of Shadows or The Book of Shadows may also refer to:

== Film and television ==
- Book of Shadows (Charmed), a fictional book in the television series Charmed
- Book of Shadows: Blair Witch 2, a 2000 American film
- Corpse Party Book of Shadows, a 2016 Japanese film based on the video game of the same name
- Nowhere Boys: The Book of Shadows, a 2016 Australian film

== Games ==
- The Book of Shadows (Mage: The Ascension), a 1993 role-playing game supplement for Mage: The Ascension
- Charmed: The Book of Shadows (board game), a 2001 board game based on the television series Charmed
- Corpse Party: Book of Shadows, a 2011 video game

== Music ==
- Book of Shadows (album), a 1996 album by Zakk Wylde
  - Book of Shadows II, a 2016 album by Zakk Wylde
- Charmed: The Book of Shadows, a 2005 soundtrack album for the television series Charmed
- "Book of Shadows", a song by Tony Martin from the 2022 album Thorns
- "The Book of Shadows", a tetralogy of songs by Dragonland from the 2004 and 2006 albums Starfall and Astronomy

== Other uses ==
- Book of Shadows (biography), a 1998 book by Phyllis Corrat
