= Hyadain discography =

- Studio albums: 1
- EPs: 1
- Singles: 10

The discography of Japanese musician Kenichi Maeyamada, known by the stage name Hyadain, consists of one album, one extended play, 10 singles and many collaborations. While most of his work for other musicians is as a producer, occasionally Maeyamada releases music billed under his own stage name Hyadain. His first two solo singles were used as the anime Nichijou's theme songs. In 2012, he released his first album 20112012, a two disc set compiling the work he did over the course of two years.

== Studio albums ==
All release dates pertain to their release in Japan, unless stated.

List of albums, with selected chart positions
Title	Album details	Peak positions	Sales (JPN) (Note: Sales provided by Oricon database and are rounded to the nearest thousand copies.)
Title	Album details	JPN	Sales (JPN)
20112012	Released: November 28, 2012; Label: Lantis; Formats: CD, digital download	2	15,000

== Extended plays ==
List of albums, with selected chart positions
Title	Album details	Peak positions	Sales (JPN)
Title	Album details	JPN	Sales (JPN)
Nichijou no Remix (日常のリミックス)	Released: August 10, 2011; Label: Lantis; Formats: CD, digital download	124	800

== Singles ==
List of singles, with selected chart positions
Title	Year	Peak chart positions		Sales (JPN)	Notes	Album
Title	Year	Oricon Singles Charts	Billboard Japan Hot 100 (Note: The Japan Hot 100 was established in February 2008.) (Note: Sources for chart positions are as follows: "Hyadain no Kakakata Kataomoi-C", "Hyadain no Jōjō Yūjō", "Christmas? Nani Sore? Oishii no?", "23:40", "Warai no Kamisama ga Oritekita",)	Sales (JPN)	Notes	Album
"Hyadain no Kakakata Kataomoi-C" (ヒャダインのカカカタ☆カタオモイ-C, "Hyadain's O-O-O-One-sided Love-C")	2011	12	35	22,000	Anime Nichijou opening theme song	20112012
"Hyadain no Jōjō Yūjō" (ヒャダインのじょーじょーゆーじょー, "Hyadain's Amazing Friendship")	2011	18	41	12,000	Anime Nichijou opening theme song	20112012
"Nyanpire Taisō" (にゃんぱいあ体操, "Nyanpire Fitness") (Nyatsuko Asō & Nyadain)	2011	163	—	600	Anime Nyanpire theme song	20112012
"Christmas? Nani Sore? Oishii no?" (クリスマス?なにそれ?美味しいの?, "Christmas? What's that? Does it taste good?")	2011	49	51	3,000		20112012
"Start It Right Away"	2012	27	—	8,000	Anime Kuroko no Basuke ending theme song	20112012
"Samba de Toriko!!!" (サンバ de トリコ!!!, "Toriko Samba!!!")	2012	101	—	1,000	Anime Toriko ending theme song	20112012
"23:40" (23時40分, Nijūsan-ji Yonjuppun) (featuring Base Ball Bear)	2013	79	30	1,000	Anime Bakuman opening theme song	Non-album singles
"Shift to Jikyū to, Tsuide ni Ai o Torimodose!!" (シフトと時給と、ついでに愛をとりもどせ!!) (Risa Yoshiki + Hyadain)	2013	67	—	2,000	Anime DD Hokuto no Ken opening theme song. Features ending theme song as B-side.	Non-album singles
"Warai no Kamisama ga Oritekita" (笑いの神様が降りてきた!, "The God of Laughter Has Come!")	2013	69	67	1,000		Non-album singles
"Hanpan Spirit" (半パン魂, "Shorts Spirit")	2014	77	—	1,000	Anime Gundam Build Fighters ending theme song	Non-album singles

=== Promotional singles ===
Title	Year	Notes	Album
"Million of Bravery"	2012	Split single with Choucho, game Million Diffusion Arthur opening theme song	20112012
"Lollipops Taisō Nōninobiyōn" (ロリポップスたいそう のーびのびよーん)	2013	TV show Be Ponkikkids song	Non-album single
"22 Seiki e no Kakehashi" (22世紀への架け橋, "A Bridge to the 22nd Century") (Tetsuya Komuro vs. Hyadain)	2013		Non-album single
"Wākyā Iwarenai" (わーきゃーいわれない)	2014		Non-album single
"Char ga Kuru" (シャアが来る)	2014		Non-album single
"Pac this World!!!"	2014	Animated series Pac-Man and the Ghostly Adventures theme song	Non-album single

== Other appearances ==
List of non-studio album or guest appearances that feature Hyadain as a billed performer
Title	Year	Notes	Album
"Battle for the Last" (Hyadain + Rico Jones)	2010	Do-Don-Pachi Dai-Fukkatsu iPhone-Version Soundtrack	Game DoDonPachi DaiFukkatsu theme song
"Ika Musume no Chikyū Shinryaku March" (イカ娘の地球侵略マーチ, "Squid Girl's World Invasion March")	2011	Ika Love	
"Dangerous Jiisan Ai no Uta" (でんぢゃらすじーさん愛の歌, "Dangerous Grandpa Love Song") (Hyadain to Jiisan (Daiki Nakamura) to Mago (Ayumi Tsunematsu))	2012		Grandpa Danger OVA theme song
