= Corpse Party: Sweet Sachiko's Hysteric Birthday Bash =

2012 video game

Sweet Sachiko's Hysteric Birthday Bash
- Developers: Team GrisGris, 5pb
- Publishers: JP: 5pb.; WW: XSEED
- Series: Corpse Party
- Platforms: PlayStation Portable; Windows
- Release: PlayStation Portable: JP: August 2, 2012; Windows: WW: April 10, 2019
- Genres: Survival horror, visual novel
- Mode: Single-player

Corpse Party: Sweet Sachiko's Hysteric Birthday Bash (Note: Kōpusu Pātī The Anthology: Sachiko no Ren'ai Yūgi (Hysteric Birthday 2U) (コープスパーティー -The Anthology- サチコの恋愛遊戯♥Hysteric Birthday 2U; lit. 'Corpse Party the Anthology: Sachiko's Game of Love (Hysteric Birthday 2U)')) is a 2012 survival horror video game developed by Team GrisGris and 5pb., as a spin-off of the Corpse Party series. Initially released only to Japan, it was localized by Xseed Games and published worldwide on April 10, 2019. Described as a "midquel" to Blood Covered and Book of Shadows on Steam, the game follows Sachiko Shinozaki's birthday, as her curse mysteriously weakens and allows her to celebrate it as someone closer to the girl she was before her death. Unlike previous entries, SSHBB has been noted to include romantic comedy and dark humor.

In 2025, the game was released for to the Nintendo Switch as a bundle with Blood Covered, Book of Shadows and Blood Drive.

== Plot ==
An extra chapter is unlocked at the game, detailing previously introduced characters Yoshiki Kishinuma and Ayumi Shinozaki, and their encounter with four students from Sugatani Senior High School, notably Azusa Takai.

== Reception ==
Michael Mouran of TheSixAxis was mostly positive about the game, giving it an 8/10. He found the addition of comedy and fan service surprising in a horror game, but he criticized the reliance on previous knowledge of other games in the series. He concluded by writing that "Corpse Party: Sweet Sachiko's Hysteric Birthday Bash is an interesting divergence from the usual gory terror of the Corpse Party franchise. It's also a gargantuan crossover event that might leave players feeling lost or confused if they aren't caught up on every piece of Corpse Party media so far. Still, the latest Corpse Party is a wacky and absurd treat that any visual novel fan is sure to get a kick out of."

CGMagazine's Joel Couture, while considering the game appealing to fans of the franchise, was more critical and rated it a 6/10. He lamented the requirement of playing other games in the series, calling it a "confusing, tangled mess." He also criticized the number of characters introduced throughout the game, and noted that the game dragged on too long. Jade Swann of opnoobs.com rated it the same 6/10 score, and she was mixed on the game opting to use dark humor and romance instead of typical horror elements like previous games. She opinioned that the game "has a charming assortment of unique characters and a host of interesting choices, but doesn't always translate well into the visual novel format" and that "the lack of any lasting consequences ultimately detracts from the title's overall impact."
