= The Big Catch =

The Big Catch may refer to:

- The Big Catch (film), a 1920 film
- The Big Catch (video game), a 2026 video game
