= Corpse Party II: Darkness Distortion =

- Announcement artwork
- Developers: Team GrisGris, Mages
- Publishers: JP: Mages; NA: Xseed Games; EU: Marvelous Europe
- Series: Corpse Party
- Platforms: Nintendo Switch; PlayStation 4; PlayStation 5; Windows
- Mode: Single-player

Corpse Party II: Darkness Distortion is an upcoming horror game being developed by Team GrisGris and Mages and published by XSEED Games in North America and Marvelous in Europe. The game will be launched on Nintendo Switch, PlayStation 4, PlayStation 5, and Windows via Steam.

Makoto Kedoin, the original creator of the series, is returning to handle scenario, and Yasuhiko Nomura is the producer. Unlike Blood Drive and Book of Shadows, Darkness Distortion is a standalone sequel.

== Gameplay ==
Corpse Party II: Darkness Distortion is a 3D horror game, taking place in a hospital. The player must inspect items and their surroundings in order to progress.

== Development ==
Darkness Distortion was announced by MAGES and Team GrisGris in August 2023.

Xseed Games officially announced the game would be localized on March 28, 2024, with a trailer and a release date of sometime in the following Fall. Preorders also went on sale at this point, and the Ayame's Mercy Edition was announced as well. Despite this, the game saw multiple delays and was eventually pushed to 2026. The developers said that the game was delayed in the interest of making the game higher quality.

== Release ==
Along with the digital version, XSEED has announced two physical release of the game; a standard edition, and a collector's release titled "Ayame's Mercy Edition." The physical game includes a reversible cover, an LED candle, a 64-page artbook, an art card, a set of items from the game, and a steelbook case.
