= London Detective Mysteria =

2013 video game

- Developer: Karin Entertainment
- Publishers: JP: Marvelous AQL (PSP); JP: Karin Entertainment (PSV); NA/EU: Xseed Games
- Platforms: PlayStation Portable, PlayStation Vita, Microsoft Windows
- Release: PlayStation Portable: JP: March 7, 2013; PlayStation Vita: JP: February 11, 2016; NA/EU: December 18, 2018; Microsoft Windows: WW: July 31, 2019
- Genre: Visual novel
- Mode: Single-player

London Detective Mysteria (Note: Known in Japan as Eikoku Tantei Mysteria (英国探偵ミステリア, Eikoku Tantei Misuteria; "English Detective Mysteria")) is a 2013 otome visual novel video game for the PlayStation Portable created by Karin Entertainment and published by Marvelous in Japan.

In 2016, Karin Entertainment self-published a PlayStation Vita port known as English Detective Mysteria: The Crown (英国探偵ミステリア: The Crown, Eikoku Tantei Mysteria: The Crown). This version includes extra scenarios, a slightly different voice cast and a new artist. This version of the game was released by Xseed Games in North America and Europe for PlayStation Vita and Microsoft Windows in 2019.

== Gameplay ==
English Detective Mysteria is classified as an otome game; like most otome games, the player takes the role of the main female character, Emily, who can choose from a variety of male characters as her love interest.

== Characters ==
Most of the characters of English Detective Mysteria are inspired by famous figures of the detective mystery genre. Besides Sherlock Holmes' and Watson' respective offspring, the game features Sara Marple, niece of Agatha Christie's Jane Marple and Jean Lupin, son of the French thief Arsène Lupin created by Maurice Leblanc. Characters Kenichirou Akechi and Seiji Kobayashi are an homage to Edogawa Ranpo's mystery series protagonists Kogoro Akechi and stepson Yoshio Kobayashi.
