= Pichi Lemon =

Japanese fashion magazine

- Cover of August 2010 issue
- Categories: Fashion
- Frequency: Monthly
- Circulation: 402,401 (2014)
- Publisher: Gakken
- First issue: April 1986
- Final issue: 31 October 2015
- Country: Japan
- Based in: Tokyo
- Language: Japanese
- Website: http://pichilemon.net/

Pichi Lemon (ピチレモン, Pichi Remon) was a Japanese fashion magazine published by Gakken. The magazine targets girls from early- to mid-teens. The magazine was known for its models (called "Pichimo" as an abbreviation for "Pichi Lemon model"), as well as its abundance of fashion and beauty advice for early-to-mid teens. It ceased publication in October 2015.

== Models ==
=== Active when publication ended ===
- Riko Sekine
- Ryō Ogawa
- Moka Kamishiraishi
- Sara Shida
- Hitomi Nakazawa
- Sāya Yamasaki
- Mio Yūki
- Kanon Yoshimura
- Manami Igashira
- Mizuki Ishida
- Yui Okada
- Mariri Sugimoto
- Mai Hitachi
- Hina Hiratsuka
- Ibuki Mita
- Kaori Yamamoto
- Yūna Kogawa
- Rikako Sasaki
- Rion Seki
- Nanami Asakura
- Noa Tsurushima
- Keina Nakano
- Noa Onda
- Kokoro Kurokawa
- Momoka Tsukada

=== Past ===
- Asumi Nakada
- Haruka Fukuhara
- Ai Moritaka
- Yūno Ōhara (Dream5)
- Nonoka Yamaguchi (E-girls)
- Nozomi Maeda
- Satsuki Nakayama
- Yuumi Shida
- Kento Yamazaki

== See also ==
- Nicola
- Love Berry
