= Corpse Party: Tortured Souls =

2013 original video animation

- Corpse Party
- The cover of the English Blu-ray release

コープスパーティー Tortured Souls -暴虐された魂の呪叫- (Kōpusu Pātī: Tortured Souls – Bōgyaku Sareta Tamashii no Jukyō)
- Genre: Horror, mystery, supernatural
- Original video animation
- Directed by: Akira Iwanaga
- Produced by: Yasuhiko Nomura; Shinsaku Tanaka; Ryōsuke Osatani; Kozue Kaneniwa; Atsushi Masaoka
- Written by: Shōichi Satō
- Music by: Asao Hamamoto (Team GrisGris); Takashi Hamada
- Studio: Asread
- Licensed by: NA: Maiden Japan
- Released: 24 July 2013
- Runtime: 30 minutes
- Episodes: 4

Corpse Party: Tortured Souls (コープスパーティー Tortured Souls -暴虐された魂の呪叫-, Kōpusu Pātī: Tortured Souls – Bōgyaku Sareta Tamashii no Jukyō; lit. Corpse Party: Tortured Souls – The Curse of Tortured Souls) is a four-episode anime OVA based on the Japanese video game Corpse Party. It serves as a sequel to the Corpse Party: Missing Footage OVA.

== Cast ==
Character	Voiced by
Satoshi Mochida	Hiro Shimono
Naomi Nakashima	Rina Satō
Ayumi Shinozaki	Asami Imai
Seiko Shinohara	Satomi Arai
Yuka Mochida	Eri Kitamura
Yoshiki Kishinuma	Yuichi Nakamura
Mayu Suzumoto	Yūka Nanri
Sakutaro Morishige	Tetsuya Kakihara
Yui Shishido	Miyuki Sawashiro
Sachiko Shinozaki	Ikue Ōtani
Yuuya Kizami	Tomokazu Sugita
Naho Saenoki	Ayano Yamamoto
Yuki Kanno	Hiromi Igarashi
Ryou Yoshizawa	Satomi Moriya
Tokiko Tsuji	Momoko Ōhara
Yoshikazu Yanagihori	Daisuke Matsuo
Takamine Yanagihori	Taira Kikumoto

== Episode list ==
No.	Title	Original release date
1	"Multiple Separation"; Transliteration: "Tajūteki Betsuri" (Japanese: 多重的別離)	July 24, 2013
A group of schoolmates from Kisaragi Academy perform a friendship charm called "Sachiko Ever After" for classmate Mayu Suzumoto, who is about to transfer to another school. Upon completing the charm, they are engulfed by an earthquake and transported to the cursed Heavenly Host Elementary School, separated from one another. Friends Naomi Nakashima and Seiko Shinohara reunite and search for an exit together, but find that all the windows and doors in the building are sealed. While they are resting in an infirmary, Seiko notices that she has lost her paper charm slip and leaves Naomi to look for it. Naomi is then attacked by a ghost and narrowly escapes before encountering a girl in a red dress. When Seiko returns, Naomi angrily berates her for leaving and drives her away. Naomi later searches for Seiko to apologize, only to find her hanged in a bathroom stall.
2	"Hinged Break"; Transliteration: "Kowareru Chōtsugai" (Japanese: 壊れる蝶番)	July 24, 2013
The Kisaragi students learn that Heavenly Host is the site of a murder incident where school teacher Yoshikazu Yanagihori allegedly severed the tongues of four children. Ayumi Shinozaki and Yoshiki Kishinuma are attacked by one of the victims' ghosts, but are rescued by the ghost of Naho Saenoki, a famed blogger who posted the Sachiko Ever After ritual online. Following her advice, they look for the murdered children's tongues to return them and lay their spirits to rest. Meanwhile, two of the other child victims violently kill Mayu, while her teacher, Yui Shishido, is struck in the head by the undead Yoshikazu. Mayu's friend Sakutaro Morishige goes on an insane rampage upon finding her remains, threatening Yuka Mochida after she is separated from her brother, Satoshi, by the girl in red. Yuka is rescued by Yuuya Kizami, a student from Byakudan Senior High School, who proves to be insane as well when he stabs Sakutaro to death and declares Yuka to be his own little sister.
3	"Unreachable Feelings"; Transliteration: "Todokanu Omoi" (Japanese: 届かぬ想い)	July 24, 2013
Yuuya pursues Yuka until he is knocked unconscious by Yoshikazu. Meanwhile, after restoring three of the four children's tongues, Ayumi and Yoshiki are transported back to Kisaragi Academy by Yuki, one of the three children, when Heavenly Host's closed space briefly destabilizes; however, the space has returned to normal, so no more can escape. Yuki shows Ayumi a vision of the murder that reveals the true culprit to be Sachiko Shinozaki, the fourth child and girl in red. Following an argument with Yoshiki, Ayumi returns to Heavenly Host to save the rest of their friends by herself. In Heavenly Host, Naho reunites Satoshi with Naomi. Yuka is captured and tortured by a partially skinned Yuuya. Yoshiki arrives and kills Yuuya before sacrificing himself to protect Yuka and Ayumi from Yoshikazu. Satoshi and Naomi find Yuka, who dies from her injuries in Satoshi's arms.
4	"Sorrowful Truth"; Transliteration: "Kanashiki Shinjitsu" (Japanese: 哀しき真実)	July 24, 2013
Ayumi tells Satoshi and Naomi that in order to return home, they must appease Sachiko and perform the Sachiko Ever After ritual again using their paper slips. Ayumi vanquishes Naho in a confrontation after realizing Naho purposefully lied about how to properly perform the ritual in her blog. Ayumi later encounters Yui, who is decapitated by falling debris. Exploring the school basement, Naomi finds a video of herself hanging Seiko while possessed; she breaks down until Seiko's spirit comforts her. After the trio put Sachiko's spirit to rest, the school begins to collapse and the trio begin the ritual. Satoshi gives his slip to Naomi, who has lost hers, and intends to use Yuka's slip for himself, unaware that it is actually Yuuya's. Naomi and Ayumi successfully return to Kisaragi Academy, but because Satoshi used a slip belonging to someone from a different location, only his severed arms come with them. Later, a traumatized Naomi secludes herself in her room, her mother not believing the existence of Seiko and the other dead classmates.

== Production ==
The original video animation was announced by game production company MAGES on 2 August 2012 as a sequel to the Corpse Party: Missing Footage OVA, which was released on the same day as the announcement.

The series was directed by Akira Iwanaga and written by Shoichi Sato, with animation by the studio Asread. Seiki Tanaka provided the series' character designs, as well as serving as chief animation director.

The opening theme is "Ring of Stardust" (星屑のリング, Hoshikuzu no Ringu) by Asami Imai, while the closing theme is "Firefly Light" (蛍火, Hotarubi) by Yumi Hara.

== Release ==
Game maker 5pb. streamed three promotional videos for the OVAs prior to their release, on 22 December 2012, 28 May 2013, and 28 June 2013.

The OVAs received a special screening（ODS.Other Digital Stuff） in Osaka on 15 June 2013, which was attended by members of the staff and cast. They were released as four episodes on 24 July 2013, and were available either as two DVDs or a Blu-ray box set.

Section23 Films licensed the series for release in North America under its Maiden Japan imprint, and released it on DVD and Blu-ray on 26 January 2016.

== Reception ==
The series has acquired recognition as one of the most gruesome anime series in existence.

Reviewing the series for Anime News Network, Theron Martin gave the North American Blu-ray release an overall grade of B, writing that "if hyperviolent fare on the level of Elfen Lied, Ninja Scroll, or Hellsing Ultimate is beyond your tolerance range then give Corpse Party a wide, wide berth. If, however, you revel in such titles then this one is a must-see." He praised the OVA's art and animation, but was less pleased with the story. He concluded that the series' "absolutely nails its main selling point – its graphic content and the visuals supporting it – and that is, indeed, all that really matters."

Chris Beveridge also gave the series a B on The Fandom Post, writing that "[i]t's plainly not my cup of tea, to be honest, but I can admire what they do and I imagine for your average viewer that doesn't see this often it'll be pretty disturbing." Commenting on the animation, he said "the show has a good look about it without being too detailed or too realistic so that it doesn't freak you out completely." He also commented that "[t]he character animation comes across well and the backgrounds are largely solid." He concluded by saying that "it's likely to be a bit of a cult show in the long run. And rightly so as I can imagine a good number of fans keeping this one handy to introduce people to an area of anime not produced often these days outside of some hentai shows."

The reviewers were split on the lack of an English dub, with Martin calling it "a curious choice, as I would think fare like this would sell well enough in the States (and possibly even beyond the normal otaku crowd) to warrant an English dub," while Beveridge wrote, "I can't imagine too many actors wanting to get in on this one considering the brutality with the kids, but it's also not a property that has huge recognition over here to warrant risking it."

In June 2022, it was reported that Saint Petersburg banned Corpse Party: Tortured Souls in Russia due to graphic violence scenes.
