= Corpse Party: Blood Drive =

2014 video game

- Official artwork
- Developers: Team GrisGris, 5pb.
- Publishers: JP: 5pb.; NA: Xseed Games; EU: Marvelous Europe
- Director: Tomita Kazunori
- Producer: Asada Makoto
- Artist: Kamishiro Sakuya
- Composers: Hamada Tomoyuki; Hamamoto Mao
- Series: Corpse Party
- Platforms: PlayStation Vita; Android; iOS; Microsoft Windows; Nintendo Switch
- Release: PlayStation Vita: JP: July 24, 2014; NA: October 13, 2015; EU: October 20, 2015; Android, iOS: WW: January 31, 2017; Windows, Switch: WW: October 10, 2019
- Mode: Single-player

Corpse Party: Blood Drive is a 2014 video game developed by Team GrisGris and 5pb. and published by 5pb. It was localized by XSEED and published for the PlayStation Vita in late 2015, digitally and physically. The game was also ported to the Nintendo Switch in 2019. It is the third game in the Corpse Party series, after Corpse Party and Corpse Party: Book of Shadows. Blood Drive takes place two months after the events of Book of Shadows, where Ayumi Shinozaki becomes severely ill from the effects of black magic.

Corpse Party: Blood Drive is the direct sequel to Corpse Party: Book of Shadows, and is the first game featuring settings and characters rendered in 3D. Upon release, the game received mixed reviews from critics, who deemed it an improvement over Book of Shadows but inferior to the original game.

== Plot ==
Continuing from the prologue included in Book of Shadows, Naomi manages to save Ayumi and takes her to a hospital. The Shinozaki estate and tome subsequently vanish without a trace. Ayumi had been severely ill for her misuse of the "Book of Shadows'" black magic. In the hospital, a woman claiming to be a spiritual associate of Hinoe's visits Ayumi. This woman belongs to the "Wiccan Institute", an organization that worships spirits. She tells her Hinoe's last wish, which is to regain the "Book of Shadows" or the world will fall into the abyss. This is partially a lie, as the woman is under threat of other organizations to get Ayumi to find the book, which they wish to use for their own gain.

After being discharged from the hospital two months later, Ayumi returns to Kisaragi Academy where Satoshi and friends give her a warm welcome. However, the absence of their dead friends is a constant reminder of their inevitable reality. A new teacher's assistant, Kuon Niwa, supervises their homeroom. Later, on her way home, a black hooded boy approaches Ayumi and tells her, "If you reclaim the "Book of Shadows" and use it at Heavenly Host, those who have died there will be revived.". Ayumi pledges that she will once more take back the "Book of Shadows". The trail leads into the previous residence of Makina Shinozaki. To make matters worse, Heavenly Host's curse is expanded by the "new Sachiko", later named "Sachi".

== Development ==
Like other games in the series, dummy head mics were utilized to provide perceived 3D sound within the game.

An English translation by XSEED was announced in May 2015.

Yumi Hara and Asami Imai provided two openings to the game; the first one being "In the Rain", by Hara, and the second being "Keshin" by Imai, which plays at Chapter 7 after Ayumi's retrieval of the "Book of Shadows". The ending song is "Translucent Days" by ARTERY VEIN.

== Release ==
The initial release of Corpse Party: Blood Drive was on July 24, 2015, limited to Japan. It was released by MAGES (formerly 5pb.) XSEED, who had published previous entries in the series, localized the game and published it in North America. In addition to the digital version, limited quantities of the game were released physically, making it the first time a Corpse Party game got a retail release in English. The physical version, titled the "Everafter Edition" retailed for 49.99USD and contained the game, a CD Soundtrack and a 100-page artbook.

The game also got a release on iOS via the Apple App store. According to TouchArcade, the app was "plagued with some nasty bugs" but they were eventually fixed.

XSEED additionally released the game on PC and the Nintendo Switch in October 3, 2019.

== Reception ==
Blood Drive received "mixed or average" reviews according to review aggregator Metacritic. According to Opencritic, 22% of critics recommended the game.

Reception

Aggregate scores
Aggregator	Score
Metacritic	60/100
OpenCritic	22%

Review scores
Publication	Score
Famitsu	7/10, 8/10, 7/10, 7/10
PlayStation Official Magazine – UK	40/100
TouchArcade	70/10

One of the few positive reviews came from Matt S. of Digitally Downloaded, who gave it a 4/5. He noted the simplicity of the puzzles, technical deficiencies and lengthy loading times and cutscenes as points of criticism, however he lauded the atmosphere and storytelling. Matt finished by saying that "Corpse Party: Blood Drive is, as far as I'm concerned, what horror games should be. Genuinely unsettling, smart, and intense, it is rare that a horror game aims to break past the jump scares and combat-heavy gameplay and simply tell a creepy story, so it's a small miracle that not only does Corpse Party try, it also largely succeeds.

Nevertheless, most critical reviews were mixed. The Vita Lounge lamented the technical problems in the game but found the story interesting, particularly for longtime fans of the series. Sparky Clarkson of GameCritics panned the game, writing that "the amusing contrast of seeing cutesy anime kids in a horror story can't sustain such a jumbled plot, muddy visual design, and irritating construction. It may be worth investigating as a cultural curiosity, but otherwise this is a party to avoid." Jade Sayers from PushSquare also panned the game, and noted that "the cute, chibi-style animation is at direct odds with the horror theme – it's hard to get scared when the characters, and villains, are presented in such a cute manner." and concluded saying "Corpse Party: Blood Drive is more scary in execution than anything. Veterans of the series may be happy to see the continuation of its plot, but the game offers little to bring in any new fans."

TouchArcade considered the iOS version a serviceable sequel but considered previous knowledge and gameplay of Blood Covered and Book of Shadows necessary to understand Blood Drive.
