= Drill Sergeant Mindstrong =

2009 video game

- Developer: HI Corporation
- Publisher: Xseed Games
- Platform: WiiWare
- Release: JP: April 14, 2009; NA: June 22, 2009; PAL: February 19, 2010
- Genre: Party
- Modes: Single-player, multiplayer

Drill Sergeant Mindstrong (Brain Cadets in the PAL region) known in Japan as Onitore - Kyoukan wa Onigunsou (オニトレ～教官は鬼軍曹～) is a military recruit training-themed party video game developed by Japanese studio HI Corporation and published by Xseed Games for WiiWare. It was released in Japan on April 14, 2009, in North America on June 22, 2009 and in the PAL regions on February 19, 2010. On January 31, 2014, the game was pulled out from the Japanese WiiWare and Wii Shop Channel.

== Gameplay ==
Players compete against each other in a series of edutainment-orientated minigames led by the titular drill instructor. The minigames include "Hell March" where the player must swing the Wii remote to keep in rhythm with the drill instructor's baton while answering questions, "Hell shooting" where the player must use a Wii remote controlled cursor to shoot targets that the instructor tells them to, "Hell calculation", where the player must shoot moving numbered targets to add them up to a specific number the instructor tells them to, and "Hell roll-call", where the player must partake in a game of Simon says and follow the instructor's poses.

If players make mistakes during each minigame, it increases the anger level of the drill sergeant. Players who make four mistakes will then be forced to complete a separate "punishment" minigame before they can continue. Extra points are given for successive correct answers, and after each round each player is given a "brain power rank" based on their performance ranging from Private to Field Marshal.

== Reception ==
Reception

Aggregate score
Aggregator	Score
Metacritic	46/100

Review scores
Publication	Score
IGN	5.5/10
Nintendo Life	5/10

Nintendo Life thought the game had a few interesting ideas, but were put off by the simplistic gameplay and mediocre presentation. Wiiloveit.com praised the "more competitive nature", making it stand out from other brain training games. The reviewer felt there should've been more activities, and was also slightly put off by the "gloomy" presentation, but still found it to be a "moderately-fun party game". Writing for IGN, Lucas Thomas found the motion controls to be faulty, and overall doubted that the game would increase the players intelligence, saying, "I don't know that anyone's mind would be much stronger for having enlisted for duty here [...]"
