= Nozomi Maeda =

Japanese model and actress (born 1993)

- 前田 希美
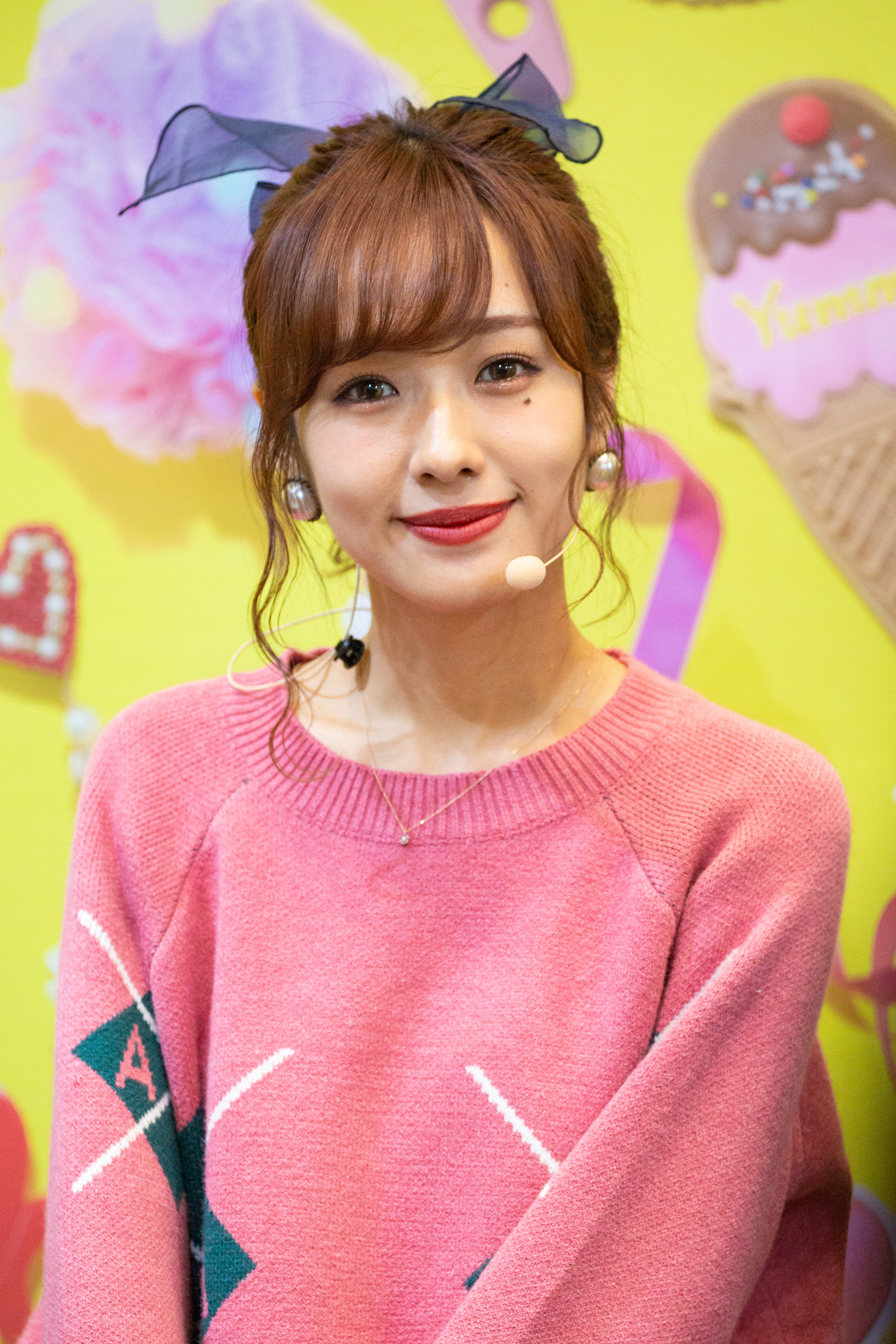
- Nozomi Maeda at Super! C Channel, 2018
- Born: June 16, 1993 (age 32); Saitama Prefecture, Japan
- Other name: Maenon (まえのん)
- Occupations: Model; actress
- Years active: 2006–present
- Agent: Vithmic
- Height: 157.8 cm (5 ft 2.1 in)
- Spouse: Ryoma Watanabe (m. 2025)

YouTube information
- Channel: Maenon
- Years active: 2017–present
- Genre: Beauty YouTuber
- Subscribers: 221 thousand
- Views: 49.1 million
- Last updated: 4 September 2024
- Website: vithmic.co.jp/talent/nozomi_maeda

Nozomi Maeda (前田 希美, Maeda Nozomi; born June 16, 1993) is a Japanese model and actress. Maeda modeled exclusively for the pre-teen fashion magazine Pichi Lemon from 2006 to 2010. From 2011 to 2017, Maeda was an exclusive model for the fashion magazine Popteen. In her early television career, Maeda was known for her appearances on Oha Suta as the show's then-Oha Girl.

== Career ==
In 2006, Maeda took part in the 14th Model Audition Grand Prix for the pre-teen fashion magazine Pichi Lemon and won, becoming an exclusive model for the magazine from May 2006 to September 2010. After graduating from Pichi Lemon, she later modeled exclusively for Popteen beginning in the March 2011 issue until 2017.

== Personal life ==
On April 9, 2025, Maeda announced on her Instagram that she married with a soccer player Ryoma Watanabe.

== Publications ==
=== Photo books ===
Year	Title	Publisher	ISBN
2010	Nozomi Maeda: Lovetoxic (前田希美♡Lovetoxic)	Gakken Publishing	ISBN 978-4056059014
2010	Nozomi Maeda: 1st Photobook: Maenon (前田希美 1stフォトブック「maenon」)	Gakken Publishing	ISBN 978-4056060904
2013	Non non, NON!	Wani Books	ISBN 978-4-8470-4601-8
2014	Maenon Nozomi Maeda Fashion Book (まえのん 前田希美 Fashion Book)	Takarajimasha	ISBN 978-4-8002-2133-9
2018	Maeda Nozomi Style Book: Nozomi no Subete. (MAEDA NOZOMI STYLE BOOK のぞみのすべて。)	Shufu to Seikatsu-sha	ISBN 978-4074353828

=== Novels ===
Year	Title	Publisher	ISBN
2010	Senpai: Himitsu no Koi (センパイ・秘密の恋) (credited for original concept)	Gakken Publishing	ISBN 9784054046122

=== Manga ===
Year	Title	Publisher	ISBN
2014	Senpai: Himitsu no Koi: Atashi ga Model ni Natta Wake (センパイ 秘密の恋 ～あたしがモデルになったワケ～) (credited for original concept)	Asahi Shimbun	ISBN 9784022757005

== Filmography ==
=== Music video ===
Year	Title	Artist	Note
2006	"Go-Go-Fighteen!"	Manami Ute	Back-up dancer

=== Television ===
Year	Title	Role	Network	Note
2006-2008	Pichi Suta	Herself	TV Saitama	Variety show regular
2007-2010	Oha Suta	Herself	TV Tokyo	Variety show regular; as Oha Girl
2009-2011	Tambourine Mania TV	Herself	Enta! 959	Variety show regular
2009-2011	Wednesday J-pop	Herself	NHK BS2	Variety show regular; as part of Sakura Babies
2009-2011	Suiensā	Herself	NHK E-TV	Variety show regular; as part of Suiensā Girls
2010	Soil	Shizuka Miura	Wowow	
2010	Ryōmaden	Nakazawa Mitsue	NHK	
2011	Nyanpire	Mori-kun, Komori-kun	Kids Station	Voice in anime
2013	Garo: Yami o Terasu Mono	Rui Suizaki	TV Saitama	
2018	Kawaii Japan-da!!	Herself	MBS TV	Variety show regular

=== Film ===
Year	Title	Role	Notes
2012	Rinjō Gekijōban	Yoshimi Sekimoto	
2014	Wonogawa	Wonoga Tsukiyama	Lead role
2015	Corpse Party	Ayumi Shinozaki	Lead role
2015	Saotome 4 Shimai	Maenon	Supporting role
2016	Corpse Party Book of Shadows	Ayumi Shinozaki	Lead role
2018	BD: Akechi Tantei Jimusho	Mayumi Hanazaki	Supporting role
