= Nyanpire =

Japanese manga and anime series

- Nyanpire: The Gothic World of Nyanpire
- Cover of the first manga volume

にゃんぱいあ (Nyanpaia)
- Manga
- Written by: yukiusa
- Original run: 2009 – 2014
- Volumes: 4
- Anime television series

Nyanpire: The Animation
- Directed by: Takahiro Yoshimatsu
- Written by: Natsuko Takahashi
- Studio: Gonzo
- Original network: GyaO!, Kids Station
- Original run: July 6, 2011 – September 21, 2011
- Episodes: 12

Nyanpire: The Gothic World of Nyanpire (にゃんぱいあ, Nyanpaia) is a Japanese dōjinshi manga series written and illustrated by Yukiusa about a black cat who becomes a vampire after being abandoned. An anime television series by Gonzo was broadcast in Japan between July 6, 2011, and September 19, 2011.

== Plot ==
A small abandoned kitten is rescued by a vampire, who feeds him some of his blood, allowing him to be reborn as a vampire cat named Nyanpire. The series follows Nyanpire's everyday life such as spending time with Misaki, his human owner and meeting other cats. Nyanpire also meets two bats called Mori and Komori.

== Characters ==
Nyanpire (にゃんぱいあ, Nyanpaia)
Voiced by: Ami Koshimizu
A small black cat who was reborn as a vampire and lives with a human owner called Misaki. As a vampire, he loves blood, but also enjoys similarly red foods, such as tomato ketchup and blood orange juice.
Masamunya Dokuganryu (独眼竜まさむにゃ, Dokuganryū Masamunya)
Voiced by: Noriaki Sugiyama
A samurai cat who falls in love with Nyanpire.
Nyatenshi (にゃてんし)
Voiced by: Jun Fukuyama
A white angel cat who was kicked out of Heaven for his womanizing behavior.
Chachamaru (茶々丸)
Voiced by: Yuko Goto
A Siamese cat who wears a large ribbon. He lives with Misaki alongside Nyanpire.
Mori-kun (毛利くん) and Komori-kun (小森くん)
Voiced by: Nozomi Maeda
A pair of bats who are somewhat related to the vampire who gave life to Nyanpire.
Misaki-chan (美咲ちゃん)
Voiced by: Shion Hirota
Nyanpire's human owner.

== Media ==
=== Anime ===
In January 2011, the Japanese animation studio Gonzo announced that an anime television adaptation of the manga was under production. Directed by Takahiro Yoshimatsu and written by Natsuko Takahashi, the series aired in Japan between July 6, 2011, and September 19, 2011. The ending theme is "Nyanpire Gymnastics" (にゃんぱいあ体操, Nyanpaia Taisō) by Natsuko Aso and Hyadain.

| No. | Title | Original release date |
|---|---|---|
| 1 | "I Want Blood meow" "Chii Kure nya" (血ぃくれにゃ) | July 6, 2011 |
Nyanpire searches the fridge looking for something to eat.
| 2 | "Masamunya Dokuganryu Appears" "Dokugan-ryū Masamunya Tōjō" (独眼流まさむにゃ登場) | July 13, 2011 |
Nyanpire meets a samurai cat, Masamunya Dokuganryu, who takes a liking to Nyanpire only to learn Nyanpire is a boy.
| 3 | "Nyatenshi Appears" "Nyatenshi-san Tōjō" (にゃてんしさん登場) | July 20, 2011 |
Nyanpire becomes friends with Nyatenshi, an angel kicked out of heaven for his misbehavior, which makes Masamunya jealous.
| 4 | "Nyatenshi's Story" "Nyatenshi-san Monogatari" (にゃてんしさん物語) | July 27, 2011 |
Nyatenshi explains the story behind his banishment from heaven, though later reveals it to be a lie.
| 5 | "Nice to Meet You" "Hajimemashite" (はじめまして) | August 3, 2011 |
Nyanpire's owner, Misaki, gets a new cat named Chachamaru who Nyanpire doesn't immediately get along with.
| 6 | "Want to Come to My House?" "Uchi ni Konai ka" (うちに来ないか) | August 10, 2011 |
Masamunya has thoughts about asking Nyanpire to come live with him.
| 7 | "Mori and Komori Appear" "Mōri-kun to Komori-kun Tōjō" (毛利くんと小森くん登場) | August 17, 2011 |
Nyanpire meets a pair of bats named Mori and Komori.
| 8 | "Summer Festival" "Natsu Matsuri" (夏祭り) | August 24, 2011 |
Masamunya tries to please Nyanpire during a summer festival.
| 9 | "My First Errand" "Hajimete no Otsukai" (はじめてのおつかい) | August 31, 2011 |
Nyanpire becomes worried when Chachamaru goes on his own to do the shopping.
| 10 | "Warrior Masamunya's Sacrifice" "Bushi Masamunya no Kenshin" (武士まさむにゃの献身) | September 7, 2011 |
Worried about Nyanpire's health, Masamunya puts Nyanpire on a program.
| 11 | "Halloween" "Harowin" (ハロウィン) | September 14, 2011 |
Nyanpire and friends decide to dress up for Halloween.
| 12 | "Vampire Once Again" "Banpaia Futatabi" (ヴァンパイア再び) | September 21, 2011 |
Since vampires are immortal, Nyanpire will outlive Misaki, Chachamaru, Nyatenshi and Masamunya which leaves Nyanpire feeling worried.

== See also ==
- Vampire films
- List of vampire television series
