= Corpse Party: Book of Shadows =

2013 video game

- North American boxart
- Developer: 5pb. Team GrisGris
- Publishers: JP: 5pb.; NA: Xseed Games; EU: Marvelous Europe
- Series: Corpse Party
- Platforms: PlayStation Portable; iOS; Microsoft Windows
- Release: PlayStation Portable: JP: September 1, 2011; NA: January 15, 2013; EU: January 23, 2013; iOS: JP: December 17, 2013; Windows: WW: October 29, 2018
- Genres: Survival horror, visual novel
- Mode: Single-player

Corpse Party: Book of Shadows is a 2011 survival horror visual novel video game developed by Team GrisGris and 5pb. and released by 5pb. for the PlayStation Portable. Xseed Games localized the game and published it in North America on January 15, 2013.

Book of Shadows is a sequel to Corpse Party and features a series of nonlinear chapters. Upon release, the game received mixed reviews from critics who generally considered it inferior to the original.

== Plot ==
This 2011 sequel to Blood Covered, Book of Shadows features a series of nonlinear chapters that add new twists and backgrounds for various characters and details important to the storyline. The game mostly takes place during the same time the first game did, continuing from one of the "wrong ends" in Corpse Party, where Sachiko sends the Kisaragi Academy students back in time. For this purpose, she erases their memories except for Satoshi's. He fails to dissuade his classmates from performing the charm, but he joins them, not wanting to let them go alone, sending them on alternative course of actions and encountering several supporting victims in Heavenly Host.

The game's epilogue, Blood Drive, serves as the set up to the eponymous sequel. Two weeks after escaping Heavenly Host, Ayumi and Naomi go to investigate the Shinozaki estate, Sachiko's birthplace, believing there is hope in reviving their dead friends since Naho and Kou Kibiki's existences were not erased like the other victims. At the estate, Ayumi discovers that she is of the same lineage as Sachiko. Hearing an eerie voice, Ayumi uncovers a magical tome known as the "Book of Shadows". Ayumi and Naomi perform a resurrection spell for Mayu, but fail. As compensation for using black magic, the book unleashes its rage upon Ayumi until her older sister Hinoe Shinozaki rushes in and saves Ayumi, at the cost of her own life.

== Release ==
Corpse Party Book of Shadows was initially released on the PSP in Japan on September 1, 2011. The game was subsequently released for GoG and Steam in 2018.

== Reception ==
Corpse Party: Book of Shadows received "mixed or average" reviews according to review aggregator website Metacritic.

Reception

Aggregate score
Aggregator	Score
Metacritic	67/100

Review scores
Publication	Score
Destructoid	7/10
Famitsu	6/10, 7/10, 7/10, 8/10
GameSpot	7/10
IGN	5.8/10
Pocket Gamer	4/5

Matthew Diener of Pocket Gamer gave the game a positive review, feeling that the game was "scary and modern in all the right ways" and that "Book of Shadows preserves the feel of its predecessor while improving on its aged gameplay and graphics." Matt Kamen in The Guardian, said that enjoyment of the game was dependent on the patience of the player, given the large amount of text, but the game "will provide a sterling example of Japanese horror." Famitsu reviewers were mostly positive.

Matthew Pollesel from Gaming Age was also mostly impressed with the game, putting particular praise on the game's story, and use of imagery and sound to scare the player.

Conversely, IGN's Scott Butterworth was more mixed, rating the game a 5.8/10. He criticized the pacing, length and some aspects of the story, and considered it a niche game for a small audience.

== Sequel ==
Corpse Party: Blood Drive was released in late 2014 for the PlayStation Vita, initially only in Japan. Xseed Games localized the game and published it in 2015.

== Film ==
A film adaptation was announced in January 2016. Kadokawa Daei released a full-length feature film titled Corpse Party: Book of Shadows (コープスパーティー, Kōpusu Pātī Book of Shadows) on July 30, 2016. It starred Rina Ikoma, Ryosuke Ikeoka and Nozomi Maeda and was the sequel to the 2015 film Corpse Party.
