= Corpse Party (film) =

2015 film

- Poster
- コープスパーティー
- Directed by: Yamada Masafumi
- Based on: Corpse Party
- Starring: Ikoma Rina; Ikeoka Ryōsuke; Yoko Kita
- Production company: Kadokawa Daiei
- Release date: August 1, 2015
- Running time: 93 minutes
- Country: Japan
- Language: Japanese

Corpse Party (コープスパーティー, Kōpusu Pātī) is a 2015 Japanese horror film directed by Masafumi Yamada and starring Ikoma Rina, Ikeoka Ryōsuke, and Maeda Nozomi. The film is based on the video game Corpse Party. It was released in Japan on August 1, 2015. A sequel, Corpse Party Book of Shadows was released on July 30, 2016.

== Plot ==
Facing graduation, Naomi Nakashima, her childhood friend Satoshi Mochida, and their classmates; Seiko Shinohara, Yoshiki Kishinuma, Sakutaro Morishige, and Mayu Suzumoto are clearing up after their last cultural festival, when class representative Ayumi Shinozaki decides to perform a charm called "Sachiko Ever After" using paper slips so they will all stay friends forever. Their teacher, Yui Shishido, comes in with Satoshi's little sister Yuka, and everyone performs the ritual but are swallowed away to a different dimension. They find themselves at Tenjin Elementary School, forced to close years ago after a series of gruesome murders.

They read newspaper articles detailing a killer of two children, Yuki, Ryou, and a third, a girl in a red dress, Sachiko, gone missing. A man with a hammer, Yoshikazu, kills Yui. Naomi twists her ankle and Seiko disappears after an argument with Naomi. Ayumi and Yoshiki witness Yuki and Ryou's ghosts killing Mayu, and Naomi finds Seiko hanged. Yoshikazu kills an insane Sakutaro. Ayumi and Yoshiki discover a video cassette and a jar of severed tongues, belonging to the children. The video was recorded by famous spiritualist Kou Kibiki, showing him and his assistant exploring the school before facing their demise at the hands of the spirits. In the video, Kou explains that to return home, the school's curse must be lifted and they need their original paper slips. Naomi thinks she has lost her slip, but Ayumi actually has it, jealous because of Naomi's close relationship with Satoshi, whom Ayumi likes. She gives Naomi a fake slip and secretly burns her real one. Ayumi returns Yuki and Ryou their severed tongues, restoring their sanity. Yuki shows Ayumi a vision, revealing that their murderer is actually Sachiko.

Yuka is murdered by Sachiko, and Yoshiki sacrifices himself to protect the others. Naomi discovers Seiko's true death when looking at Kou's ghost capture cameras: Naomi was possessed by Sachiko and killed Seiko. She breaks down at this but Seiko's spirit comforts her. Naomi rushes to protect Satoshi from Sachiko and sees a vision: Sachiko's mother, Yoshie, the school's nurse, was pushed down the stairs by Takamine, the principal. She broke her neck, and her daughter Sachiko, who witnessed the incident, was strangled by Takamine. He hid her body and cut out her tongue; this began the curse.

Naomi, Ayumi, and Satoshi uncover Sachiko's body. Sachiko attacks them; they try to convince her that her mother does not want her killing anyone but Sachiko doesn't believe them until Naomi reveals her mother's pendant, which she had found. Sachiko calms and her mother embraces her, ending the curse. With the school collapsing, the trio proceed with the reverse ritual. Naomi and Ayumi make it back home but discover they are each holding Satoshi's severed arms; he had seen Ayumi give Naomi a fake slip and took it from Naomi, giving her his real one and using the fake one himself.

In a post-credits scene, Naomi is in her room, gazing at Sachiko.

== Cast ==
- Rina Ikoma as Naomi Nakashima
- Ikeoka Ryōsuke as Satoshi Mochida
- Nozomi Maeda as Ayumi Shinozaki
- JUN (BEE SHUFFLE) as Yoshiki Kishinuma
- Yoko Kita as Seiko Shinohara
- Reina Visa as Mayu Suzumoto
- Ryōtarō as Sakutaro Morishige
- Ayu Matsuura as Yuka Mochida
- Kazuhiko Kanayama as Kou Kibiki
- Atsuko Kosaka as Yui Shishido
- Eri Takeuchi as Yoshie Shinozaki
- Hiroki Ōkawa as Takamine Yanagihori
- Shunsaku Mayama as Yoshikazu Yanagihori
- Saya Uchida as Yuki Kanno
- Haruto Satake as Ryou Yoshizawa
- Honoka Naitō as Sachiko Shinozaki

== Sequel ==
A sequel was announced in January 2016. Corpse Party Book of Shadows was released on July 30, 2016.

== See also ==
- List of films based on video games
