= The Big Catch (video game) =

- Developer: Filet Group
- Publisher: Xseed Games
- Platform: Windows
- Release: 2026
- Genre: Platformer
- Mode: Single-player

The Big Catch is an upcoming 3D platformer developed by Filet Group and Xseed Games. The game stars an acrobatic fisherman Caster on his adventure to find ingredients. It is scheduled to be released for Windows in 2026.

== Premise ==
On a request from Chef Leurre, the boss of the restaurant The Big Catch, Caster starts an adventure in search of ingredients for the menu and draw in new customers.

== Gameplay ==
The Big Catch is a single-player 3D platformer inspired by the fifth and sixth generation of video game consoles. The player takes control of Caster, an acrobatic fisherman with various platforming abilities. Additionally, Caster is equipped with a fishing rod, with which he can cast, hook and reel in objects to interact with the world.

== Development and release ==
The Big Catch was developed by Filet Group, a Canadian video game company. The developer launched a crowdfunding campaign through Kickstarter in 2022, which collected CA$241,747. In June 2024, Xseed Games, a third-party label under Marvelous USA, announced it would publish the game for Microsoft Windows. The game was announced for 2025 release, but it was delayed to 2026.

Prior to the full launch, as part of the IGN Summer of Gaming event, Filet Group released The Big Catch: Tacklebox, a standalone demo starring Caster's rival Tackle. Tacklebox contains a seamless open world with levels, similar to Bowser's Fury. Tacklebox was released on June 7th, 2024.
