= Corpse Party =

Video game series

- Promotional artwork for Corpse Party. Characters featured (clockwise from the top left): Sachiko Shinozaki, Satoshi Mochida, Yuka Mochida, Naomi Nakashima, Seiko Shinohara.
- Developers: Kenix Soft (1996); Team GrisGris (2006–present); Mages. (2010–present); Mechanic Arms (2015–present)
- Publishers: Kenix Soft (1996); Enterbrain (2006–2007); Team GrisGris (2006–2011); Mages. (2010–present); GrindHouse (2013–present)
- Platforms: PC-9801; Mobile; Microsoft Windows; PlayStation Portable; PlayStation Vita; PlayStation 4; iOS; Nintendo 3DS; Android; Nintendo Switch; Xbox One; Xbox Series X/S
- First release: Corpse-Party; April 22, 1996 (Japan only)
- Latest release: Corpse Party: Tetralogy Pack; August 7, 2025 (Japan only)

Corpse Party (Japanese: コープスパーティー, Hepburn: Kōpusu Pātī) is a horror video game originally created by Makoto Kedōin and eventually developed by Team GrisGris. Blending elements and genres of supernatural horror, survival horror, adventure, and doujin soft, the video game often features high school students who attempt to escape after becoming trapped in an abandoned, parallel school, haunted by a vengeful spirit in a red dress.

The video game has spawned several manga, an anime OVA, drama CDs, and two live action films.

== History ==
The first game in the franchise was developed using the RPG Maker software version RPG Tsukūru Dante 98 and released on April 22, 1996, for the PC-9801. It was followed by three remakes:

1. Corpse Party: NewChapter, (Note: Kōpusu Pātī NewChapter (コープスパーティー NewChapter)) which was released incomplete for mobile phones from October 3, 2006, to December 26, 2007
2. Corpse Party: Blood Covered, (Note: Kōpusu Pātī Buraddo Kabā (コープスパーティー ブラッドカバー)) which was released for Microsoft Windows from December 31, 2007, to July 28, 2011. A re-release was made on PC Steam in 2016, under the title Corpse Party.
3. Corpse Party: Blood Covered... Repeated Fear, (Note: Kōpusu Pātī Buraddo Kabā: Ripītiddo Fiā (コープスパーティーブラッドカバー リピーティッドフィアー)) which was released for the PlayStation Portable on August 12, 2010, and iOS on February 9, 2012. It was released on PC Steam in 2021, under the title Corpse Party (2021).

The game was released in North America and Europe by Xseed Games and Marvelous Europe under the title Corpse Party. Xseed Games planned to release a localized version of Corpse Party: Blood Covered for PC in North America in 2015, but the title was delayed until 2016. A 3DS version of the game, titled Corpse Party Blood Covered: ...Repeated Fear was released in Japan on July 30, 2015, and contains a new extra chapter not present in the PSP and iOS version.

The PSP game was followed by a sequel, Corpse Party: Book of Shadows, (Note: Kōpusu Pātī Book of Shadows (コープスパーティー Book of Shadows)) which was released for the PSP on September 1, 2011, in Japan, and on January 15, 2013, in North America. The game was later released on PC Steam in 2018.

A spin-off game, Corpse Party: Sweet Sachiko's Hysteric Birthday Bash, (Note: Kōpusu Pātī The Anthology: Sachiko no Ren'ai Yūgi (Hysteric Birthday 2U) (コープスパーティー -The Anthology- サチコの恋愛遊戯♥Hysteric Birthday 2U; lit. 'Corpse Party the Anthology: Sachiko's Game of Love (Hysteric Birthday 2U)')) was released for the PSP in Japan on August 2, 2012, and was released for Windows worldwide on April 10, 2019. It is described as a "midquel to Corpse Party and Corpse Party: Book of Shadows" on Steam.

A direct sequel of Corpse Party: Book of Shadows, called Corpse Party: Blood Drive, (Note: Kōpusu Pātī Buraddo Doraibu (コープスパーティー ブラッドドライブ)) was released in Japan on July 24, 2014, on PlayStation Vita, and was released in North America by XSeed Games on October 13, 2015, and on October 20, 2015, in Europe. The game is now available on Steam.

Another sequel titled Corpse Party 2: Dead Patient (Note: (コープスパーティー2 Dead Patient)) was created for the PC by GrindHouse, a dōjin circle founded by members affiliated with Team GrisGris. It was planned to be released episodically, with the first chapter released on May 29, 2013. An updated version of the chapter, Corpse Party 2: Dead Patient Neues, (Note: (コープスパーティー2 Dead Patient Neues)) was released on October 5, 2017 and made available on Steam on October 23, 2019.

In May 2025, Mages announced a bundle of Blood Covered, Book of Shadows, Sweet Sachiko's Hysteric Birthday Bash and Blood Drive called Corpse Party: Tetralogy Pack would be coming to the Nintendo Switch, and it was released on August 7, 2025, in Japan.

In August 2023, Corpse Party II: Darkness Distortion (Note: (コープスパーティーII Darkess Disortion)) was announced by MAGES. and Team GrisGris. It is the spiritual sequel to Corpse Party: Blood Drive. It will launch in Japan on PS4, PS5, Switch, and PC with Makoto Kedouin returning as scenario writer.

== Plot ==
The plot of the original Corpse Party game concerns a group of Japanese high school students, celebrating their school's culture festival. The group are telling ghost stories when a sudden paranormal "earthquake" transports them to a dilapidated schoolhouse in an alternate dimension. The school is haunted by the ghosts of people who have been trapped there. The main playable character is Satoshi Mochida, a kind-hearted high school student who is teased by his classmates for his cowardly nature. Three of the other characters are students from Satoshi's class: Naomi Nakashima, Satoshi's childhood friend; Yoshiki Kishinuma, an intimidating yet good-natured student; and Ayumi Shinozaki, the class representative. Rounding out the group is Yuka Mochida, Satoshi's younger sister. The game's antagonist is the ghost of a former student, a girl in a red dress who seeks vengeance for her and her mother's deaths at the hands of a teacher many years prior.

=== Blood Covered and Repeated Fear ===
Corpse Party: NewChapter remake was released for mobile phones in four chapters from October 3, 2006, to December 26, 2007. It was discontinued before Chapter 5 was released. It contained the same plot additions as the later Blood Covered, but had much smaller maps.

Blood Covered, released for PC in five chapters from December 31, 2007, to July 28, 2011, is an enhanced remake and port of the 1996 Corpse Party. It includes more characters, larger maps, updated graphics, and a cast of amateur voice actors. It was followed on August 12, 2010, by another enhanced remake, Blood Covered: Repeated Fear, which was released internationally as Corpse Party, which features updated art and the addition of professional voice actors/actresses.

The remake thoroughly expands the plot and setting of the original game. Here, the haunted schoolhouse is named Heavenly Host Elementary School (天神小学校, Tenjin Shōgakkō), a fictional Fujisawa elementary school that was torn down following the murders and disappearances of several of its staff and students. In modern-day Japan, the main characters' high school, Kisaragi Academy (如月学園, Kisaragi Gakuen), has been built over the elementary school site. The students are transported to Heavenly Host after performing a charm called "Sachiko Ever After (幸せのサチコさん, Shiawase no Sachiko-san)", which would supposedly allow them to remain friends for eternity.

In addition to the five protagonists of the original game, Blood Covered introduces four characters to the playable cast: Seiko Shinohara, Naomi's best friend; Mayu Suzumoto, a popular student due to transfer out of Kisaragi; Sakutaro Morishige, Mayu's best friend; and Yui Shishido, the class's homeroom teacher. Blood Covered also includes several characters from other schools who are also trapped inside Heavenly Host and affect the story. Two notable characters are Naho Saenoki, a selfish but helpful paranormalist from Paulownia Academy (桐章学園, Kirishō Gakuen) who discovered the "Sachiko Ever After" charm and came to investigate Heavenly Host; and Yuuya Kizami, a sadistic student from Byakudan Senior High School (白壇高等学校, Byakudan Kōtōgakkō) who accompanies Yuka as she is separated from her brother. The red ghost is re-envisioned as a little girl named Sachiko Shinozaki who kills the students of Heavenly Host in anger over her and her mother's murder.

=== Another Child ===
Corpse Party: Another Child is a spin-off manga that takes place during the events of Corpse Party. With their school, Satsukiyama Academy (皐月山学園, Satsukiyama Gakuen), shutting down for good, the students of a small town were heading for different directions in life, not until they decide to perform the "Sachiko Ever After" charm swallowing the entire class to Heavenly Host Elementary, along with a mysterious girl's spirit. In order to get out, they must track and get rid of the spirit.

=== Book of Shadows ===
This 2011 sequel to Blood Covered, Book of Shadows features a series of nonlinear chapters that add new twists and backgrounds for various characters and details important to the storyline. The game mostly takes place during the same time the first game did, continuing from one of the "wrong ends" in Corpse Party, where Sachiko sends the Kisaragi Academy students back in time. For this purpose, she erases their memories except for Satoshi's. He fails to dissuade his classmates from performing the charm, but he joins them, not wanting to let them go alone, sending them on alternative course of actions and encountering several supporting victims in Heavenly Host.

The game's epilogue, Blood Drive, serves as the set up to the eponymous sequel. Two weeks after escaping Heavenly Host, Ayumi and Naomi go to investigate the Shinozaki estate, Sachiko's birthplace, believing there is hope in reviving their dead friends since Naho and Kou Kibiki's existences were not erased like the other victims. At the estate, Ayumi discovers that she is of the same lineage as Sachiko. Hearing an eerie voice, Ayumi uncovers a magical tome known as the "Book of Shadows". Ayumi and Naomi perform a resurrection spell for Mayu, but fail. As compensation for using black magic, the book unleashes its rage upon Ayumi until her older sister Hinoe Shinozaki rushes in and saves Ayumi, at the cost of her own life.

=== Sweet Sachiko's Hysteric Birthday Bash ===
On the day of Sachiko's birth and death, the curse on her weakens and she gets 24 hours to celebrate her birthday as someone closer to the girl she was before her death. She uses the time loops as established in Corpse Party: Book of Shadows to force all survivors at that point to participate in activities she has set up. Given it is either that or die horribly again, something all are aware that they have already experienced but cannot remember in full, they go along with her demands. The game features almost all characters from the previous games and some new ones. While a pseudo-horror spin-off at best, it is part of the storyline, setting up a few details to prepare for Corpse Party: Blood Drive.

As with Corpse Party: Book of Shadows, there is only one extra chapter. This extra chapter takes place during the previous game and is more conventional horror. It tells of Yoshiki's and Ayumi's encounter with four students from Sugatani Senior High School, notably Azusa Takai.

=== Blood Drive ===
Corpse Party: Blood Drive is the direct sequel to Corpse Party: Book of Shadows, and is the first game featuring settings and characters rendered in 3D. The game was released for the Sony PlayStation Vita in Japan in July 2014 by 5pb. The characters are depicted in 3D chibi style, however traditional CG artwork appears during cutscenes, illustrated by Sakuya Kamishiro.

Continuing from the prologue included in Book of Shadows, Naomi manages to save Ayumi and takes her to a hospital. The Shinozaki estate and tome subsequently vanish without a trace. Ayumi had been severely ill for her misuse of the "Book of Shadows'" black magic. In the hospital, a woman claiming to be a spiritual associate of Hinoe's visits Ayumi. This woman belongs to the "Wiccan Institute", an organization that worships spirits. She tells her Hinoe's last wish, which is to regain the "Book of Shadows" or the world will fall into the abyss. This is partially a lie, as the woman is under threat of other organizations to get Ayumi to find the book, which they wish to use for their own gain.

After being discharged from the hospital two months later, Ayumi returns to Kisaragi Academy where Satoshi and friends give her a warm welcome. However, the absence of their dead friends is a constant reminder of their inevitable reality. A new teacher's assistant, Kuon Niwa, supervises their homeroom. Later, on her way home, a black hooded boy approaches Ayumi and tells her, "If you reclaim the "Book of Shadows" and use it at Heavenly Host, those who have died there will be revived.". Ayumi pledges that she will once more take back the "Book of Shadows". The trail leads into the previous residence of Makina Shinozaki. To make matters worse, Heavenly Host's curse is expanded by the "new Sachiko", later named "Sachi".

=== 2: Dead Patient ===
The game Corpse Party 2: Dead Patient takes place five years after the events of Corpse Party Heavenly Host Arc, implied to be the consequences of the Book of Shadows' powers starting to bring about the end of the world by allowing the spirit realm and real world to start to converge together. The setting is Amare Patriarcha Crucis Hospital (文月大付属・慈愛十字(パトリアーカル)病院, Fumizuki Daifuzoku Patoriākaru Byōin; "July University Patriarchal Hospital") fallen into a dark abyss. Patient records and clinical charts are scattered all over the hospital, with zombies and a bizarre SWAT team roaming through the hallways. An amnesiac girl, Ayame Itou, wakes up on an operating table and encounters the dark happenings around her.

=== II: Darkness Distortion ===
On August 11, 2020, MAGES' YouTube channel released a "10 Years of Corpse Party Repeated Fear" video celebrating the Heavenly Host Saga, at the end of the Timeline they show off "202X" with then the words "Darkness Distortion" followed by the last words of "More Corpse...", which seems to tease a direct sequel to Corpse Party: Blood Drive, which was called "The End of the Heavenly Host Saga".

== Development ==
The first game in the series was developed using the RPG Maker version RPG Tsukūru Dante 98 software and released in 1996 for the PC-9801.

Dummy head mics were utilized for Blood Covered, Book of Shadows, and Blood Drive to provide perceived three dimensional sound.

== Media listing ==
List of Corpse Party video games
Title	Developer	Publisher	Platform	Release date		
Title	Developer	Publisher	Platform	Japan	North America	Europe
Corpse-Party (Note: Kōpusu Pātī (コープスパーティー))	Kenix Soft	JP: Kenix Soft	PC-9801	April 22, 1996	—N/a	—N/a
Corpse Party: NewChapter	Team GrisGris	JP: Team GrisGris	Mobile	October 3, 2006 – December 26, 2007	—N/a	—N/a
Corpse Party: Blood Covered	Team GrisGris	JP: Team GrisGris; WW: Xseed Games	Windows	December 31, 2007 – July 28, 2011	April 25, 2016	April 25, 2016
Corpse Party: Blood Covered ...Repeated Fear	Team GrisGris, 5pb.	JP: 5pb. NA: Xseed Games; EU: Marvelous Europe	PlayStation Portable	August 12, 2010	November 22, 2011	December 14, 2011
Corpse Party: Blood Covered ...Repeated Fear	Team GrisGris, 5pb.	JP: 5pb. NA: Xseed Games; EU: Marvelous Europe	iOS	February 9, 2012	August 14, 2012	August 14, 2012
Corpse Party: Blood Covered ...Repeated Fear	Team GrisGris, 5pb.	JP: 5pb. NA: Xseed Games; EU: Marvelous Europe	Nintendo 3DS	July 30, 2015	October 25, 2016	October 26, 2016
Corpse Party: Blood Covered ...Repeated Fear	Team GrisGris, 5pb.	JP: 5pb. NA: Xseed Games; EU: Marvelous Europe	Nintendo Switch	February 18, 2021	October 20, 2021	October 20, 2021
Corpse Party: Blood Covered ...Repeated Fear	Team GrisGris, 5pb.	JP: 5pb. NA: Xseed Games; EU: Marvelous Europe	PlayStation 4	February 18, 2021	October 20, 2021	October 20, 2021
Corpse Party: Blood Covered ...Repeated Fear	Team GrisGris, 5pb.	JP: 5pb. NA: Xseed Games; EU: Marvelous Europe	Xbox One	—N/a	October 20, 2021	October 20, 2021
Corpse Party: Blood Covered ...Repeated Fear	Team GrisGris, 5pb.	JP: 5pb. NA: Xseed Games; EU: Marvelous Europe	Xbox Series X/S	—N/a	October 20, 2021	October 20, 2021
Corpse Party: Blood Covered ...Repeated Fear	Team GrisGris, 5pb.	JP: 5pb. NA: Xseed Games; EU: Marvelous Europe	Windows	October 20, 2021	October 20, 2021	October 20, 2021
Corpse Party: Book of Shadows	Team GrisGris, 5pb.	JP: 5pb. NA: Xseed Games; EU: Marvelous Europe	PlayStation Portable	September 1, 2011	January 15, 2013	January 23, 2013
Corpse Party: Book of Shadows	Team GrisGris, 5pb.	JP: 5pb. NA: Xseed Games; EU: Marvelous Europe	iOS	December 17, 2013	—N/a	—N/a
Corpse Party: Book of Shadows	Team GrisGris, 5pb.	JP: 5pb. NA: Xseed Games; EU: Marvelous Europe	Windows	October 29, 2018	October 29, 2018	October 29, 2018
Corpse Party: Sweet Sachiko's Hysteric Birthday Bash	Team GrisGris, 5pb.	JP: 5pb. WW: Xseed Games	PlayStation Portable	August 2, 2012	—N/a	—N/a
Corpse Party: Sweet Sachiko's Hysteric Birthday Bash	Team GrisGris, 5pb.	JP: 5pb. WW: Xseed Games	Windows	April 10, 2019	April 10, 2019	April 10, 2019
Corpse Party 2: Dead Patient	GrindHouse	JP: GrindHouse	Windows	May 29, 2013	—N/a	—N/a
Corpse Party: Blood Drive	Team GrisGris, 5pb.	JP: 5pb. NA: Xseed Games; EU: Marvelous Europe	PlayStation Vita	July 24, 2014	October 13, 2015	October 20, 2015
Corpse Party: Blood Drive	Team GrisGris, 5pb.	JP: 5pb. NA: Xseed Games; EU: Marvelous Europe	Android, iOS	January 31, 2017	January 31, 2017	January 31, 2017
Corpse Party: Blood Drive	Team GrisGris, 5pb.	JP: 5pb. NA: Xseed Games; EU: Marvelous Europe	Windows	October 10, 2019	October 10, 2019	October 10, 2019
Corpse Party: Blood Drive	Team GrisGris, 5pb.	JP: 5pb. NA: Xseed Games; EU: Marvelous Europe	Nintendo Switch	October 10, 2019	October 10, 2019	October 10, 2019
Corpse Party 2: Dead Patient Neues	GrindHouse	JP: GrindHouse; WW: Xseed Games	Windows	October 5, 2017	October 23, 2019	October 23, 2019
Corpse Party: Tetralogy Pack (Note: (コープスパーティー Tetralogy Pack))	Team GrisGris, Mages	JP: Mages	Nintendo Switch	August 7, 2025	—N/a (Note: Originally planned for an October 28, 2025 release by XSeed Games, but was later cancelled after failing to meet Nintendo of America guidelines.)	—N/a
Corpse Party II: Darkness Distortion	Team GrisGris, Mages	JP: Mages; NA: Xseed Games; EU: Marvelous Europe	Windows, Nintendo Switch, PlayStation 4, PlayStation 5	2026	2026	2026

List of Corpse Party manga series
Title	Author	Illustrator	Publisher	Magazine(s)	Volumes	Original run
Corpse Party: Blood Covered	Makoto Kedōin	Toshimi Shinomiya	Square Enix	Gangan Powered, Gangan Joker	10 (47 chapters)	August 22, 2008 – October 22, 2012
Corpse Party; Musume (Note: Kōpusu Pātī; Musume (コープスパーティー;娘; lit. "Corpse Party: The Girl/Daughter"))	Makoto Kedōin	Mika Orii	Media Factory	Monthly Comic Alive	3 (20 chapters)	August 27, 2010 – July 27, 2012
Corpse Party: Another Child (Note: (コープスパーティー Another Child))	Makoto Kedōin	Shunsuke Ogata	Mag Garden	Monthly Comic Blade	3 (17 chapters)	August 30, 2011 – February 28, 2013
Corpse Party: Book of Shadows	Makoto Kedōin	Mika Orii	Media Factory	Monthly Comic Alive	3 (24 chapters)	August 23, 2012 – March 24, 2014
Corpse Party: Sweet Sachiko's Hysteric Birthday Bash	Makoto Kedōin	Tsubakurou Shibata	Enterbrain	Famitsu Comic Clear	2 (12 chapters)	June 22, 2013 – January 15, 2015
Corpse Party Cemetery 0: Kaibyaku no Ars Moriendi (Note: Kōpusu Pātī Cemetery 0: Kaibyaku no Arusu Moriendi (コープスパーティーCemetery 0〜開闢のアルス・モリエンディ〜; lit. "Corpse Party Cemetery 0: The Genesis of Ars Moriendi"))	Makoto Kedōin	Ichihaya	Takeshobo	Manga Life Win	2 (19 chapters)	June 22, 2013 – April 17, 2014

List of Corpse Party anime and live-action film media
Title	Director	Producer	Run time	Release date
Corpse Party: Missing Footage (Note: (コープスパーティー Missing Footage))	Akira Iwanaga	Asread	11 minutes	August 2, 2012
Corpse Party: Tortured Souls (Note: Kōpusu Pātī Tortured Souls – Bōgyakusareta Tamashī no Jukyō (コープスパーティー Tortured Souls ―暴虐された魂の呪叫―; lit. "Corpse Party: Tortured Souls – The Curse of Tortured Souls-"))	Akira Iwanaga	Asread	117 minutes (4 episodes)	July 24, 2013
Corpse Party	Masafumi Yamada	Kadokawa Daiei	93 minutes	August 1, 2015
Corpse Party Book of Shadows	Masafumi Yamada	Kadokawa Daiei	93 minutes	July 30, 2016

== Critical reception ==
Aggregate review scores As of December 20, 2019.
Game	GameRankings	Metacritic
Corpse Party	(PSP) 73% (PC) 71% (3DS) 81%	(PSP) 71/100 (PC) 71/100 (3DS) 77/100
Corpse Party: Book of Shadows	(PSP) 68%	(PSP) 67/100
Corpse Party: Blood Drive	(VITA) 60% (Switch) 50%	(VITA) 60/100 (Switch) 54/100
Corpse Party 2: Dead Patient	-	67/100

The first game's 3DS version received "generally favourable" reviews according to the review aggregator Metacritic. Other releases received "mixed or average" reviews.

== Adaptations ==
The video game series has been adapted into four manga series: Corpse Party: Blood Covered, published by Square Enix; Corpse Party: Musume and Corpse Party: Book of Shadows, published by Media Factory; and Corpse Party: Another Child, published by Mag Garden. The manga has sold over 1 million copies, as of May 2015.

One original video animation (OVA), Corpse Party: Missing Footage, was released on August 2, 2012. Another OVA consisting of four episodes titled Corpse Party: Tortured Souls, was released on July 24, 2013, and later licensed by Section23 Films.

A live action film adaptation was released on August 1, 2015, while a film adaptation of Corpse Party: Book of Shadows was released on June 30, 2016.

== China ban ==
On June 12, 2015, the Chinese Ministry of Culture listed Corpse Party among 38 anime and manga titles banned in China.
