= Corpse Party Book of Shadows =

2016 Japanese film directed by Masafumi Yamada

- Poster

Japanese name
- Kanji: コープスパーティー Book of Shadows
Transcriptions
- Revised Hepburn: Kōpusu Pātī Book of Shadows
- Directed by: Masafumi Yamada
- Screenplay by: Yoshimasa Akamatsu
- Based on: Corpse Party
- Starring: Rina Ikoma; Ryōsuke Ikeoka; Nozomi Maeda
- Production company: Kadokawa Daiei
- Release date: July 30, 2016
- Country: Japan
- Language: Japanese

Corpse Party Book of Shadows (コープスパーティー, Kōpusu Pātī Book of Shadows) is a 2016 Japanese slasher horror film directed by Masafumi Yamada and starring Rina Ikoma, Ryōsuke Ikeoka and Nozomi Maeda. The film is based on the video game of the same name and is a sequel to the 2015 film Corpse Party. Nijika Ishimori from Keyakizaka46 made her film debut in this film. It was released in Japan on July 30, 2016.

== Plot ==
The film starts with a group of students from Byakudan Senior High School who just performed the "Sachiko Ever After" charm. Arriving in Tenjin Elementary School, Mitsuki is murdered by Sachiko Shinozaki, terrifying the other students.

Meanwhile, Naomi Nakashima has been hospitalized for half a year due to the traumatic deaths of her friends. Ayumi Shinozaki explains that her sister, Hinoe, has been researching a way to redeem things. Ayumi bites a bone that belonged to Sachiko, sending Naomi back in time to the haunted school. Naomi is delighted to see her best friend Seiko alive again. Ayumi is unable to save Yui and Mayu from their fate and Seiko and Naomi discover Sakutaro's headless body. Hinoe finds the missing bone and realizes Ayumi is making a mistake. There are two things needed to avoid a repeated death: the forbidden Book of Shadows and an entity called "Sachi".

Satoshi finds his little sister Yuka along with Ayumi and Yoshiki, but Sachiko attacks them. Naomi repels Sachiko with Sachiko's mother's necklace. Byakudan students Kensuke and Tohko are hiding till Yuuya arrives. The surviving Kisaragi students rediscover Sachiko's corpse just like last time, and Yuka dies. Naomi places the necklace on Sachiko, restoring her sanity. They encounter the Byakudan students and race to return home. Nothing happens when they do the reverse charm and an argument arises. Seiko is then decapitated by "Sachiko" and Sachi emerges from her body before murdering Tohko.

Naomi, Kensuke and Yuuya find a video camera and watch another Byakudan student, Emi Urabe, crying as Yuuya stabs her to death. Stunned, Kensuke demands an explanation but Yuuya stabs him too, revealing that he is insane and responsible for Ryosuke Katayama and Sakutaro's deaths. Hineo saves Ayumi, Yoshiki and Satoshi from the evil spirits and clarifies that Sachi is Sachiko's resentful twin sister. Sachiko ascending caused her to awaken. Yuuya lures them to a science room but Satoshi sees through his deception and fights him. Yoshiki dies and a dying Satoshi hits Yuuya's face with a bottle of sulfuric acid, disfiguring him.

Hinoe reveals the Book of Shadows' existence but a horrifically-scarred Yuuya kills her and gives chase until Sachi finishes Yuuya off for good. Ayumi grabs Sachi and drags them both down. Naomi follows Sachiko's voice to where the book lies and a white Sachiko appears. Naomi finds herself back in the real world. Opening the book, she recites "Please let everyone live!" The room shakes and the voices of her friends are heard when a disgusting creature composed of her dead friends, including Sachiko, crawls into the room, terrifying her. The book tears, leaving her fate unknown.

== Cast ==
- Rina Ikoma as Naomi Nakashima
- Ryōsuke Ikeoka as Satoshi Mochida
- Nozomi Maeda as Ayumi Shinozaki
- Ren Ishikawa as Tohko Kirisaki
- Atomu Mizuishi as Kensuke Kurosaki
- JUN (BEE SHUFFLE) as Yoshiki Kishinuma
- Yōko Kita as Seiko Shinohara
- Nijika Ishimori as Hinoe Shinozaki
- Tsunenori Aoki as Yuuya Kizami
- Ayu Matsuura as Yuka Mochida
- Honoka Naito as Sachiko Shinozaki
- Hitomi Noda as Mitsuki Yamamoto
- Rinka Ichishima as Emi Urabe

== See also ==
- List of films based on video games
