= Xseed Games =

American video game localization company

Marvelous USA Inc.
- Formerly: XSEED JKS, Inc. (2004-2013)
- Type: Subsidiary
- Industry: Video games
- Founded: November 2004; 22 years ago
- Headquarters: Torrance, California, US
- Key people: Ken Berry (president and CEO)
- Parent: AQ Interactive (2007–2011); Marvelous (2011–present)
- Website: marvelous-usa.com

Marvelous USA Inc. (formerly Xseed Games) is an American video game company founded in 2004. It was acquired by AQ Interactive in 2007 and became part of Marvelous in 2013. In 2024, the company retained the Xseed Games brand solely for third-party published titles.

== History ==
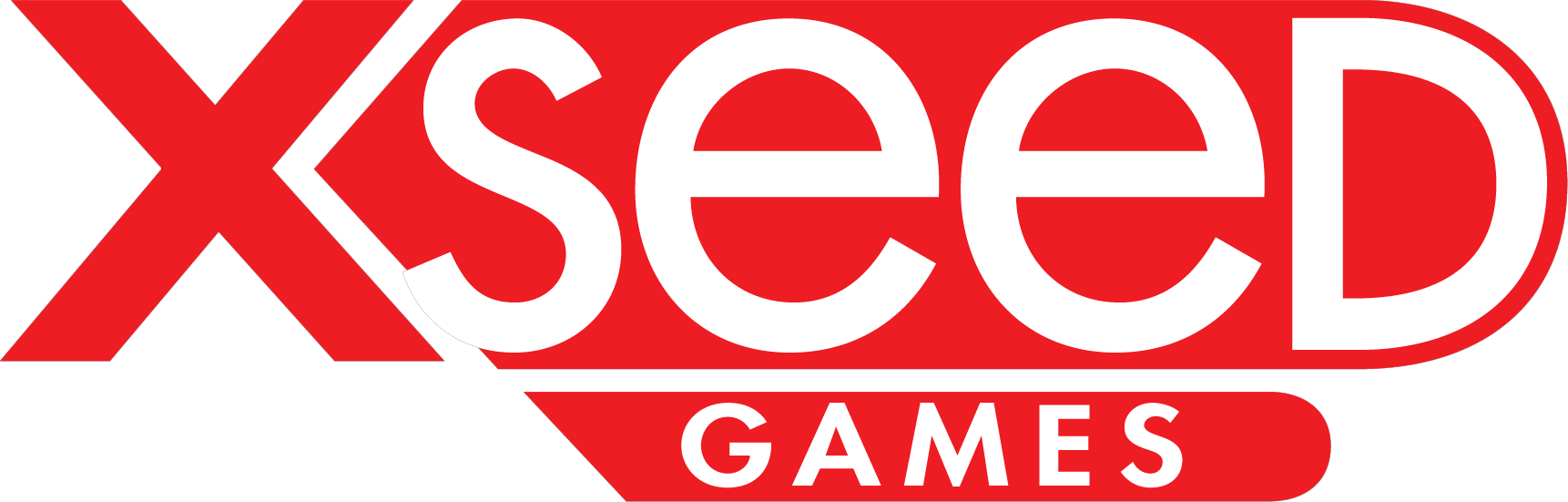
Former logo and current third-party brand

The company was founded in 2004 by former Square Enix USA employees, with the goal of localizing Japanese games for the American market. In 2007, AQ Interactive, Inc. announced the acquisition of Xseed Games, with share transfer before June. The deal was signed on April 24, and the share transfer was completed on June 26.

Xseed Games joined forces with Marvelous Entertainment (MMV) to co-publish its games in North America in 2008. At E3 2008, MMV USA and Xseed Games distinguished the games that would be co-published under the agreement and the games that Xseed would publish separately.

In April 1, 2009, AQ Interactive announced it would be increasing its stake of Xseed Games from 55% to 90%.

On April 14, 2009, Xseed Games announced a partnership with Japanese developer Nihon Falcom. It would go on to localize and publish Ys Seven, Ys: The Oath in Felghana, Ys I & II Chronicles, and the Trails in the Sky trilogy for the PlayStation Portable in North America. Xseed Games later published Ys: The Oath in Felghana and Ys Origin as its first releases on the Steam digital distribution platform in 2012.

In March 2013, Index Corporation's Atlus Online Division online business unit was purchased by Marvelous AQL and transferred to Xseed. On April 6, MarvelousAQL announced that XSEED JKS, Inc. would be renamed to Marvelous USA Inc., with the Xseed banner being used for video games and the Marvelous Online banner would be used for mobile and social titles.

In October 2019, company cofounder Ken Berry was named its president, CEO, and CFO.

In August 2024, Marvelous announced that Marvelous USA would undergo a major restructural change. The Xseed Games banner would now be used for third-party titles, while the Marvelous USA banner would be used for Marvelous' titles.

== Controversy ==
In 2019, former Xseed localization producer Brittany Avery discovered that she was not credited for her work on the enhanced PlayStation 4 port of The Legend of Heroes: Trails of Cold Steel after leaving the company the previous year. As a result, Xseed revealed its policy of not crediting staff members in games if they are no longer employed at the company at the time it releases. The practice, also done by some other companies in the industry, was widely criticized.

== Games ==
Title	Developer(s)	Release date	Platform	Ref.
Wild Arms 4	Media.Vision	January 10, 2006	PlayStation 2	
Shadow Hearts: From the New World	Nautilus	March 7, 2006	PlayStation 2	
Valhalla Knights	K2 LLC; Marvelous Entertainment	April 17, 2007	PlayStation Portable	
Dungeon Maker: Hunting Ground	Global A Entertainment	June 19, 2007	PlayStation Portable	
Brave Story: New Traveler	Game Republic	July 31, 2007	PlayStation Portable	
Wild Arms 5	Media.Vision	August 28, 2007	PlayStation 2	
Victorious Boxers: Revolution	Grand Prix; Cavia	October 16, 2007	Wii	
Wild Arms XF	Media.Vision	March 11, 2008	PlayStation Portable	
Valhalla Knights 2 (Note: Co-published with Marvelous Entertainment.)	K2 LLC	October 1, 2008	PlayStation Portable	
KORG DS-10	Cavia	November 4, 2008	Nintendo DS	
Populous DS	Genki	November 11, 2008	Nintendo DS	
Retro Game Challenge	indieszero	February 10, 2009	Nintendo DS	
Avalon Code	Matrix Software	March 10, 2009	Nintendo DS	
Rune Factory Frontier	Neverland	March 17, 2009	Wii	
Flower, Sun, and Rain: Murder and Mystery in Paradise	Grasshopper Manufacture h.a.n.d.	June 16, 2009	Nintendo DS	
Drill Sergeant Mindstrong	HI Corporation	June 22, 2009	Wii (Note: Via WiiWare.)	
Little King's Story	Cing	July 21, 2009	Wii	
Valhalla Knights: Eldar Saga	K2 LLC	September 29, 2009	Wii	
The Wizard of Oz: Beyond the Yellow Brick Road	Media.Vision	September 29, 2009	Nintendo DS	
Ju-on: The Grudge	feelplus	October 13, 2009	Wii	
Half-Minute Hero	Marvelous Entertainment	October 13, 2009	PlayStation Portable	
The Sky Crawlers: Innocent Aces	Project Aces; Access Games	January 12, 2010	Wii	
Valhalla Knights 2: Battle Stance	K2 LLC	January 21, 2010	PlayStation Portable (Note: Via PlayStation Network.)	
KORG DS-10 Plus	Cavia	February 16, 2010	Nintendo DS	
Ragnarok DS	GungHo Online Entertainment	February 16, 2010	Nintendo DS	
Lunar: Silver Star Harmony	Game Arts	March 2, 2010	PlayStation Portable	
Fragile Dreams: Farewell Ruins of the Moon	Namco Bandai Games tri-Crescendo	March 16, 2010	Wii	
Samurai Shodown: Sen	SNK Playmore	March 30, 2010	Xbox 360	
Ys Seven	Nihon Falcom	August 17, 2010	PlayStation Portable	
Ys Seven	Nihon Falcom	August 30, 2017	Windows	
Ivy the Kiwi?	Prope	August 24, 2010	Nintendo DS	
Ivy the Kiwi?	Prope	August 24, 2010	Wii	
Ivy the Kiwi? Mini	Prope	October 11, 2010	Nintendo DS (Note: Via DSiWare.)	
Ys: The Oath in Felghana	Nihon Falcom	November 2, 2010	PlayStation Portable	
Ys: The Oath in Felghana	Nihon Falcom	March 19, 2012	Windows	
Ys I & II Chronicles	Nihon Falcom	February 22, 2011	PlayStation Portable	
Ys I & II Chronicles	Nihon Falcom	February 14, 2013	Windows	
The Legend of Heroes: Trails in the Sky	Nihon Falcom	March 29, 2011	PlayStation Portable	
The Legend of Heroes: Trails in the Sky	Nihon Falcom	July 29, 2014	Windows	
Wizardry: Labyrinth of Lost Souls	Acquire	June 2, 2011	PlayStation 3	
Wizardry: Labyrinth of Lost Souls	Acquire	January 15, 2020	Windows	
Solatorobo: Red the Hunter	CyberConnect2	September 27, 2011 (Note: North America only.)	Nintendo DS	
Fishing Resort	Prope	November 21, 2011	Wii	
Corpse Party	Team GrisGris; 5pb.	November 22, 2011	PlayStation Portable	
Corpse Party	Team GrisGris; 5pb.	April 25, 2016	Windows	
Corpse Party	Team GrisGris; 5pb.	October 25, 2016	Nintendo 3DS	
Corpse Party	Team GrisGris; 5pb.	December 4, 2017	Linux	
Sumioni	Acquire	March 20, 2012	PlayStation Vita	
Ys Origin	Nihon Falcom	May 31, 2012	Windows	
Unchained Blades	FuRyu	June 26, 2012	PlayStation Portable	
Unchained Blades	FuRyu	January 3, 2013	Nintendo 3DS	
The Last Story	Mistwalker; AQ Interactive	August 14, 2012	Wii	
Way of the Samurai 4	Acquire	August 21, 2012	PlayStation 3	
Orgarhythm	Acquire; Neilo	October 23, 2012	PlayStation Vita	
Ragnarok Odyssey	Game Arts; GungHo Online Entertainment	October 30, 2012	PlayStation Vita	
Corpse Party: Book of Shadows	Team GrisGris; 5pb.	January 15, 2013	PlayStation Portable	
Corpse Party: Book of Shadows	Team GrisGris; 5pb.	October 29, 2018	Windows	
Ark of the Ages	Meteorise	March 1, 2013	Android	
Ark of the Ages	Meteorise	March 29, 2013	iOS	
Pandora's Tower	Ganbarion	April 16, 2013	Wii	
Killer Is Dead	Grasshopper Manufacture	August 27, 2013	PlayStation 3	
Killer Is Dead	Grasshopper Manufacture	August 27, 2013	Xbox 360	
Rune Factory 4	Neverland	October 1, 2013	Nintendo 3DS	
Valhalla Knights 3	K2 LLC	October 15, 2013	PlayStation Vita	
Senran Kagura Burst	Tamsoft	November 14, 2013	Nintendo 3DS	
Ys: Memories of Celceta	Nihon Falcom	November 26, 2013	PlayStation Vita	
Ys: Memories of Celceta	Nihon Falcom	July 25, 2018	Windows	
Ys: Memories of Celceta	Nihon Falcom	June 9, 2020	PlayStation 4	
Ragnarok Odyssey Ace	Game Arts	April 1, 2014	PlayStation Vita	
Ragnarok Odyssey Ace	Game Arts	April 1, 2014	PlayStation 3	
Bullet Witch	Cavia	May 13, 2014 (Note: Atari lost publishing rights and was republished digitally.)	Xbox 360	
Bullet Witch	Cavia	April 25, 2018	Windows	
Akiba's Trip: Undead & Undressed	Acquire	August 5, 2014	PlayStation 3	
Akiba's Trip: Undead & Undressed	Acquire	August 5, 2014	PlayStation Vita	
Akiba's Trip: Undead & Undressed	Acquire	November 25, 2014	PlayStation 4	
Akiba's Trip: Undead & Undressed	Acquire	May 26, 2015	Windows	
Senran Kagura Shinovi Versus	Tamsoft	October 14, 2014	PlayStation Vita	
Senran Kagura Shinovi Versus	Tamsoft	June 1, 2016	Windows	
Senran Kagura Bon Appétit!	Tamsoft	November 11, 2014	PlayStation Vita	
Senran Kagura Bon Appétit!	Tamsoft	November 10, 2016	Windows	
Brandish: The Dark Revenant	Nihon Falcom	January 13, 2015	PlayStation Portable	
Story of Seasons	Marvelous AQL	March 31, 2015	Nintendo 3DS	
Ys: The Ark of Napishtim	Nihon Falcom	April 28, 2015	Windows	
Lord of Magna: Maiden Heaven	Marvelous	June 2, 2015	Nintendo 3DS	
Onechanbara Z2	Tamsoft	July 21, 2015	PlayStation 4	
Senran Kagura 2: Deep Crimson	Tamsoft	September 15, 2015	Nintendo 3DS	
Corpse Party: Blood Drive	Team GrisGris; 5pb.	October 13, 2015	PlayStation Vita	
Corpse Party: Blood Drive	Team GrisGris; 5pb.	October 10, 2019	Windows	
Corpse Party: Blood Drive	Team GrisGris; 5pb.	October 10, 2019	Nintendo Switch	
The Legend of Heroes: Trails in the Sky SC	Nihon Falcom	October 29, 2015	PlayStation Portable	
The Legend of Heroes: Trails in the Sky SC	Nihon Falcom	October 29, 2015	Windows	
Earth Defense Force 2: Invaders from Planet Space	Sandlot	December 8, 2015	PlayStation Vita	
Earth Defense Force 4.1: The Shadow of New Despair	Sandlot	December 8, 2015	PlayStation 4	
The Legend of Heroes: Trails of Cold Steel	Nihon Falcom	December 22, 2015	PlayStation 3	
The Legend of Heroes: Trails of Cold Steel	Nihon Falcom	December 22, 2015	PlayStation Vita	
The Legend of Heroes: Trails of Cold Steel	Nihon Falcom	August 2, 2017	Windows	
The Legend of Heroes: Trails of Cold Steel	Nihon Falcom	March 26, 2019	PlayStation 4	
Nitroplus Blasterz: Heroines Infinite Duel	Examu	February 2, 2016	PlayStation 3	
Nitroplus Blasterz: Heroines Infinite Duel	Examu	February 2, 2016	PlayStation 4	
Nitroplus Blasterz: Heroines Infinite Duel	Examu	December 8, 2016	Windows	
Return to PoPoLoCrois: A Story of Seasons Fairytale	Epics	March 1, 2016	Nintendo 3DS	
Senran Kagura Estival Versus	Tamsoft	March 15, 2016	PlayStation 4	
Senran Kagura Estival Versus	Tamsoft	March 15, 2016	PlayStation Vita	
Senran Kagura Estival Versus	Tamsoft	March 17, 2017	Windows	
Little King's Story	Cing	August 5, 2016	Windows	
The Legend of Heroes: Trails of Cold Steel II	Nihon Falcom	September 6, 2016	PlayStation 3	
The Legend of Heroes: Trails of Cold Steel II	Nihon Falcom	September 6, 2016	PlayStation Vita	
The Legend of Heroes: Trails of Cold Steel II	Nihon Falcom	February 14, 2018	Windows	
The Legend of Heroes: Trails of Cold Steel II	Nihon Falcom	June 4, 2019	PlayStation 4	
Touhou: Scarlet Curiosity	Ankake Spa	September 20, 2016	PlayStation 4	
Touhou: Scarlet Curiosity	Ankake Spa	July 11, 2018	Windows	
Exile's End	Magnetic Realms	October 25, 2016	PlayStation Vita,	
Exile's End	Magnetic Realms	October 25, 2016	PlayStation 4	
Exile's End	Magnetic Realms	November 22, 2016	Wii U	
Xanadu Next	Nihon Falcom	November 3, 2016	Windows	
Shantae: Half-Genie Hero	WayForward	December 20, 2016	Wii U (Note: Only publishing the retail versions.)	
Shantae: Half-Genie Hero	WayForward	December 20, 2016	PlayStation 4	
Shantae: Half-Genie Hero	WayForward	December 20, 2016	PlayStation Vita	
Shantae: Half-Genie Hero	WayForward	May 8, 2018	Nintendo Switch	
Fate/Extella: The Umbral Star	Marvelous	January 17, 2017	PlayStation 4	
Fate/Extella: The Umbral Star	Marvelous	January 17, 2017	PlayStation Vita	
Fate/Extella: The Umbral Star	Marvelous	July 25, 2017	Windows	
Fate/Extella: The Umbral Star	Marvelous	July 25, 2017	Nintendo Switch	
Story of Seasons: Trio of Towns	Marvelous	February 28, 2017	Nintendo 3DS	
The Legend of Heroes: Trails in the Sky the 3rd	Nihon Falcom	May 3, 2017	Windows	
Akiba's Beat	Acquire	May 16, 2017	PlayStation 4	
Akiba's Beat	Acquire	May 16, 2017	PlayStation Vita	
Senran Kagura: Peach Beach Splash	Tamsoft	September 26, 2017	PlayStation 4	
Senran Kagura: Peach Beach Splash	Tamsoft	March 7, 2018	Windows	
Zwei: The Ilvard Insurrection	Nihon Falcom	October 31, 2017	Windows	
Zwei: The Arges Adventure	Nihon Falcom	January 24, 2018	Windows	
Freedom Planet	GalaxyTrail	August 30, 2018	Nintendo Switch	
Senran Kagura Reflexions	Tamsoft	September 13, 2018	Nintendo Switch	
Senran Kagura Reflexions	Tamsoft	June 24, 2019	Windows	
Gal Metal	DMM Games	October 30, 2018	Nintendo Switch	
Gungrave VR	Red/Development	December 11, 2018	PlayStation 4	
Gungrave VR	Red/Development	March 6, 2019	Windows	
London Detective Mysteria	Karin Entertainment	December 18, 2018	PlayStation Vita	
London Detective Mysteria	Karin Entertainment	July 31, 2019	Windows	
Senran Kagura Burst Re:Newal	Tamsoft	January 22, 2019	Windows	
Senran Kagura Burst Re:Newal	Tamsoft	January 22, 2019	PlayStation 4	
Fate/Extella Link	Marvelous First Studio	March 19, 2019	PlayStation 4	
Fate/Extella Link	Marvelous First Studio	March 19, 2019	PlayStation Vita	
Fate/Extella Link	Marvelous First Studio	March 19, 2019	Windows	
Fate/Extella Link	Marvelous First Studio	March 19, 2019	Nintendo Switch	
Corpse Party: Sweet Sachiko's Hysteric Birthday Bash	MAGES inc 5pb.	April 10, 2019	Windows	
Senran Kagura Peach Ball	Honey Parade Games	July 9, 2019	Nintendo Switch	
Senran Kagura Peach Ball	Honey Parade Games	August 14, 2019	Windows	
BurgerTime Party!	G-Mode	October 8, 2019	Nintendo Switch	
Travis Strikes Again: No More Heroes	Grasshopper Manufacture	October 17, 2019	PlayStation 4	
Corpse Party 2	Team GrisGris	October 23, 2019	Windows	
Heroland	FuRyu	December 3, 2019	Nintendo Switch	
Heroland	FuRyu	December 3, 2019	PlayStation 4	
Heroland	FuRyu	December 3, 2019	Windows	
Daemon X Machina	Marvelous	February 13, 2020	Windows	
Rune Factory 4 Special	Marvelous	February 25, 2020	Nintendo Switch	
Rune Factory 4 Special	Marvelous	December 7, 2021	Windows	
Rune Factory 4 Special	Marvelous	December 7, 2021	PlayStation 4	
Rune Factory 4 Special	Marvelous	December 7, 2021	Xbox One	
Granblue Fantasy Versus	Arc System Works	March 3, 2020	PlayStation 4	
Granblue Fantasy Versus	Arc System Works	March 13, 2020	Windows	
Story of Seasons: Friends of Mineral Town	Marvelous	July 14, 2020	Nintendo Switch	
Story of Seasons: Friends of Mineral Town	Marvelous	July 14, 2020	Windows	
Story of Seasons: Friends of Mineral Town	Marvelous	October 26, 2021	PlayStation 4	
Story of Seasons: Friends of Mineral Town	Marvelous	October 26, 2021	Xbox One	
Kandagawa Jet Girls	Honey Parade Games	August 25, 2020	PlayStation 4	
Kandagawa Jet Girls	Honey Parade Games	August 25, 2020	Windows	
Uppers	Honey Parade Games	October 21, 2020	Windows	
No More Heroes	Grasshopper Manufacture	October 28, 2020	Nintendo Switch	
No More Heroes	Grasshopper Manufacture	June 9, 2021	Windows	
No More Heroes 2: Desperate Struggle	Grasshopper Manufacture	October 28, 2020	Nintendo Switch	
No More Heroes 2: Desperate Struggle	Grasshopper Manufacture	June 9, 2021	Windows	
Sakuna: Of Rice and Ruin	Edelweiss	November 10, 2020	PlayStation 4	
Sakuna: Of Rice and Ruin	Edelweiss	November 10, 2020	Nintendo Switch	
Sakuna: Of Rice and Ruin	Edelweiss	November 10, 2020	Windows	
Story of Seasons: Pioneers of Olive Town	Marvelous	March 23, 2021	Nintendo Switch	
Story of Seasons: Pioneers of Olive Town	Marvelous	September 15, 2021	Windows	
Akiba's Trip: Hellbound & Debriefed	Acquire	July 20, 2021	Windows	
Akiba's Trip: Hellbound & Debriefed	Acquire	July 20, 2021	PlayStation 4	
Akiba's Trip: Hellbound & Debriefed	Acquire	July 20, 2021	Nintendo Switch	
Shadowverse: Champion's Battle	Cygames	August 10, 2021	Nintendo Switch	
Knockout Home Fitness	Pocket	September 28, 2021	Nintendo Switch	
Corpse Party (2021)	MAGES inc	October 20, 2021	Nintendo Switch	
Corpse Party (2021)	MAGES inc	October 20, 2021	PlayStation 4	
Corpse Party (2021)	MAGES inc	October 20, 2021	Windows	
Corpse Party (2021)	MAGES inc	October 20, 2021	Xbox One	
Rune Factory 5	Marvelous	March 22, 2022	Nintendo Switch	
Deadcraft	Marvelous First Studio	May 19, 2022	PlayStation 4	
Deadcraft	Marvelous First Studio	May 19, 2022	PlayStation 5	
Deadcraft	Marvelous First Studio	May 19, 2022	Windows	
Deadcraft	Marvelous First Studio	May 19, 2022	Xbox One	
Deadcraft	Marvelous First Studio	May 19, 2022	Xbox Series X/S	
No More Heroes III	Grasshopper Manufacture	October 6, 2022	PlayStation 4	
No More Heroes III	Grasshopper Manufacture	October 6, 2022	PlayStation 5	
No More Heroes III	Grasshopper Manufacture	October 6, 2022	Windows	
No More Heroes III	Grasshopper Manufacture	October 6, 2022	Xbox One	
No More Heroes III	Grasshopper Manufacture	October 6, 2022	Xbox Series X/S	
Potionomics	Voracious Games	October 17, 2022	Windows	
Loop8: Summer of Gods	Sieg Games	June 6, 2023	PlayStation 4	
Loop8: Summer of Gods	Sieg Games	June 6, 2023	Windows	
Loop8: Summer of Gods	Sieg Games	June 6, 2023	Xbox One	
Loop8: Summer of Gods	Sieg Games	June 6, 2023	Nintendo Switch	
Story of Seasons: A Wonderful Life	Marvelous	June 27, 2023	PlayStation 5	
Story of Seasons: A Wonderful Life	Marvelous	June 27, 2023	Windows	
Story of Seasons: A Wonderful Life	Marvelous	June 27, 2023	Xbox Series X/S	
Story of Seasons: A Wonderful Life	Marvelous	June 27, 2023	Nintendo Switch	
Touhou: New World	Ankake Spa	July 13, 2023	PlayStation 4	
Touhou: New World	Ankake Spa	July 13, 2023	PlayStation 5	
Touhou: New World	Ankake Spa	July 13, 2023	Windows	
Touhou: New World	Ankake Spa	July 13, 2023	Nintendo Switch	
Fashion Dreamer	Marvelous	November 3, 2023	Nintendo Switch	
Cuisineer	BattleBrew Productions	November 9, 2023	Windows	
Freedom Planet 2	GalaxyTrail	April 4, 2024	Nintendo Switch	
Freedom Planet 2	GalaxyTrail	April 4, 2024	PlayStation 4	
Freedom Planet 2	GalaxyTrail	April 4, 2024	PlayStation 5	
Freedom Planet 2	GalaxyTrail	April 4, 2024	Xbox One	
Freedom Planet 2	GalaxyTrail	April 4, 2024	Xbox Series X/S	
Farmagia	Marvelous	November 1, 2024	Windows	
Farmagia	Marvelous	November 1, 2024	Nintendo Switch	
Farmagia	Marvelous	November 1, 2024	PlayStation 5	
Rune Factory: Guardians of Azuma	Marvelous	June 5, 2025	Nintendo Switch	
Rune Factory: Guardians of Azuma	Marvelous	June 5, 2025	Nintendo Switch 2	
Rune Factory: Guardians of Azuma	Marvelous	June 5, 2025	Windows	
The Big Catch	Filet Group	TBA	Windows	
Sakuna Chronicles: Kokorowa and the Gears of Creation	Edelweiss	TBA	TBA	

== See also ==
- Rising Star Games
