= Corpse Party (2008 video game) =

2008 video game

- Game icon of the 2021 re-release
- Developers: Team GrisGris, 5pb.
- Publishers: BloodCovered; JP: Team GrisGris; WW: Xseed Games; Repeated Fear; JP: 5pb.; NA: Marvelous USA; EU: Marvelous Europe; WW: Crunchyroll (2025 mobile versions)
- Series: Corpse Party
- Platforms: Microsoft Windows; PlayStation Portable; iOS; Android; Nintendo 3DS; Nintendo Switch; PlayStation 4; Xbox One; Xbox Series X/S
- Release: BloodCovered: JP: December 31, 2007 (Cover.1); JP: March 8, 2008 (1+2); JP: August 17, 2008 (3); JP: August 16, 2009 (4); JP: July 28, 2011 (5); WW: April 25, 2016; Repeated Fear August 12, 2010: PlayStation Portable; JP: August 12, 2010; NA: November 22, 2011; EU: December 14, 2011 iOS (original release); JP: February 9, 2012; NA/EU: August 14, 2012 Nintendo 3DS; JP: July 30, 2015; NA: October 25, 2016; EU: October 26, 2016 Nintendo Switch, PlayStation 4; JP: February 18, 2021; NA/EU: October 20, 2021 Xbox One, Xbox Series X/S; NA/EU: October 20, 2021 Windows; WW: October 20, 2021 iOS, Android (remaster); JP: 2025; NA/EU: 2025
- Genre: Adventure
- Mode: Single-player

Corpse Party, released in Japan as Corpse Party: BloodCovered, (Note: Japanese: コープスパーティー ブラッドカバー, Hepburn: Kōpusu Pātī Buraddo Kabā) is a horror adventure game developed by Team GrisGris and published by Xseed Games for Microsoft Windows. Originally developed as Corpse Party: NewChapter (Note: コープスパーティー NewChapter, Kōpusu Pātī NewChapter) for Japanese mobile phones, it is a remake of the 1996 NEC PC-9801 video game Corpse-Party, and the second game in the Corpse Party series. Containing similar gameplay to its predecessor, players control a group of high school students who are transported to a haunted elementary school after performing a supposed friendship ritual, looking for a way to escape. Corpse Party is the first game in the series' rebooted continuity, introducing new characters and elements to those present in the original game, while generally following the same plot.

An enhanced port of the game for the PlayStation Portable was released in 2010 as Corpse Party: BloodCovered ...Repeated Fear (Note: Japanese: コープスパーティーブラッドカバー リピーティッドフィアー, Hepburn: Kōpusu Pātī Buraddo Kabā Ripītiddo Fiā) in Japan. This remaster was later ported to iOS, Android, Nintendo 3DS, Nintendo Switch, PlayStation 4, Xbox One, Xbox Series X/S, and was also re-released for Microsoft Windows. Since its release, the game has received generally positive reviews across all platforms, gaining praise for its inventive sound design, though it received criticism for its drawn out wrong endings. A sequel, Corpse Party: Book of Shadows, was released for the PlayStation Portable in 2011.

== Gameplay ==
A dialogue sequence in the PlayStation Portable version of Corpse Party. These sequences combine both the in-game character sprites and full dialogue portraits that are more akin to a visual novel.

Corpse Party is played in a third-person view from a top-down perspective. Players are tasked with exploring the haunted school grounds for a means of escape. To fulfill this task, characters must interact with the environment and surroundings, such as picking up objects, talking to other characters, and inspecting documents while avoiding enemies. Characters possess hit points (HP), which measure how much damage they can take from enemies and obstacles before dying. Unlike the original 1996 Corpse-Party, the remake omits role-playing game elements like magic and a battle system, with characters taking damage exclusively through overhead navigation.

Corpse Party also contains longer dialogue sequences during story progression, where full character portraits are used along with the 2D in-game character sprites. These sequences make up a large portion of the game's playtime, which has caused some to outright describe Corpse Party as a visual novel, rather than an adventure game. These sequences make use of the game's binaural audio, allowing players to hear events in perceived three-dimensional space.

The game's story is split into five chapters, each focusing on different characters and featuring multiple endings that are achieved based on the player's in-game decisions: a "True Ending" required for the game's progression; and several "Wrong Endings", the game's equivalent of a game over. If a character's hit points reach zero or a poor decision is made, a Wrong Ending will be achieved, requiring the player to reload their save file to continue playing. As players progress through the game, they unlock ten extra chapters that focus on the game's side characters and expand the storyline.

== Plot ==
Set in 2008 in Fujisawa, Japan, Corpse Party takes place at Kisaragi Academy, a high school built on the remains of Heavenly Host Elementary School, which was closed when a series of murders and disappearances occurred years prior. The game primarily centers around a group of nine, seven of which are students of Kisaragi Academy. These include the original five characters from Corpse-Party—Satoshi and Yuka Mochida, Naomi Nakashima, Ayumi Shinozaki, and Yoshiki Kishinuma—as well as four additional characters: Seiko Shinohara, Mayu Suzumoto, Sakutaro Morishige, and their teacher, Yui Shishido.

Prompted by Ayumi, the group gathers at night at Kisaragi Academy to perform a charm circulated around the internet as Sachiko Ever After, which would supposedly allow them to stay friends for eternity. Upon its completion, the group is instead transported to a different dimension, where a haunted Heavenly Host still stands.

In the group's time in Heavenly Host, they discover that many others have been transported to the school before them, most of whom have already been killed. With four of the original group members dying along the way, the remaining five learn that the school's existence is a result of Sachiko Shinozaki, a young girl in a red dress. Sachiko, who was murdered alongside her mother, kills the inhabitants of Heavenly Host in a rage over their deaths, and was responsible for the murders of the other students at Heavenly Host before it was shut down.

In an attempt to appease Sachiko's soul, the group collects the remains of the students she killed and return them to her. When this succeeds, they are transported back to their dimension, but learn that the memories of everybody who died in Heavenly Host have been erased, as if they had never existed.

== Development and release ==
Corpse Party began development as a game titled Corpse Party: NewChapter for Japanese NTT DoCoMo mobile phones, released in four chapters from October 3, 2006 to December 26, 2007. A remake of the 1996 NEC PC-9801 Corpse-Party, this game contained new story elements not found in the original game, introducing new characters and expanding the game's setting. This version was never completed, with its fifth chapter not released.

The assets created for NewChapter were repurposed by Team GrisGris for the Microsoft Windows game Corpse Party: BloodCovered, which was released exclusively in Japan in five chapters from December 31, 2007 to July 28, 2011. This new remake contained all of the additions as its mobile predecessor, but its building layouts were notably much larger than its mobile counterpart, and amateur voice acting was added during dialogue sequences.

In 2010, the company released Corpse Party: BloodCovered ...Repeated Fear for the PlayStation Portable in Japan. The first game in the series to receive a proper English release in late 2011, this port of BloodCovered contained further additions and enhancements, including a more professional Japanese voice cast, redesigned graphics and character artwork, and an animated opening sequence. In all of its English releases, the game was retitled to simply Corpse Party. The game was ported to Apple iOS in 2012, Nintendo 3DS in 2015, and Nintendo Switch, PlayStation 4, Xbox One, Xbox Series X and Series S, and back to Windows in its enhanced form in 2021, and ports of the 2021 remaster for iOS and Android were released by Crunchyroll via their game service. Each re-release contained its own unique additions, primarily bonus chapters focusing on side characters.

On April 25, 2016, preceding the North American and European release of the Nintendo 3DS version of the game, the original Corpse Party: BloodCovered for Windows was released in English for the first time, again retitled to just Corpse Party. This version includes its own exclusive bonus chapters and the option to fast-forward through previously seen dialogue sequences.

== Reception ==
Reception

Aggregate score
Aggregator	Score
Metacritic	PC (BC): 71/100 (11 reviews); PSP: 71/100 (18 reviews); 3DS: 77/100 (17 reviews); Switch: 81/100 (4 reviews); PS4: 73/100 (4 reviews)

Review scores
Publication	Score
1Up.com	B
Destructoid	PSP: 9/10; 3DS: 8.5/10; Switch: 7.5/10
Edge	6/10
Electronic Gaming Monthly	PSP: 8/10; 3DS: 4/5
Famitsu	PSP: 7/10, 7/10, 7/10, 7/10
Game Informer	8/10
GameSpot	7.5/10
GamesRadar+	3.5/5
Gamezebo	4/5
Hardcore Gamer	4/5
IGN	7/10
Nintendo Life	8/10
Pocket Gamer	3/5
RPGFan	PC (BC): 70/100; 3DS: 85/100
TouchArcade	2.5/5

Corpse Party has been largely well-received by critics, especially following the PlayStation Portable release of the game. Writing for Electronic Gaming Monthly, Mollie L. Patterson praised the character work in the game, describing a "small wave of panic and despair" she felt over the central group of characters, whom she originally described as a "who's who of Japanese anime stereotypes." Along with Marko Djordjević from GameSpot and Kimberley Wallace from GamesRadar+, Patterson specifically praised the game's audio design, describing a specific sequence in the game in which gruesome audio is used in place of visuals to disturb the player. Concurring, Ryan Clements from IGN wrote that he "couldn't imagine playing it without a top-of-the-line pair of headphones." Peter Willington from Pocket Gamer likewise praised the starring personalities of the game, specifically praising the teacher character Yui Shishido and the duo of Seiko Shinohara and Naomi Nakashima. Chris Shive from Hardcore Gamer applauded the game's horror atmosphere, and specifically how it is complemented by the original soundtrack.

Corpse Party's most extensive criticism is of its multiple ending system. While providing some praise for the disturbing nature of the wrong endings, Chris Walden from Destructoid addressed a specific example where avoiding a wrong ending in the game's second chapter was very difficult, made more cumbersome by the fact that he could not skip the wrong ending's long dialogue sequence after having already seen it prior. Dom Kim of RPGFan shared this sentiment, describing his frustration at seeing all of the game's long wrong endings, especially when he was unable to find save points. Kim found that the gameplay was uninteresting in general, stating as the conclusion of his review, "I like Corpse Party a lot, just not as a game."

Shaun Musgrave from TouchArcade heavily criticized the original iOS release of the game, saying, "unless you want your wallet to meet a bad ending itself, don't bother crashing this party, lest this party crash on you." Among his criticisms were a lack of iPad support, unpleasant screen borders, blurry filtered graphics, unaccommodating controls, and frequent game crashes that he experienced while playing.

== Adaptations ==
In 2008, the game was adapted into the manga series Corpse Party: BloodCovered, published by Square Enix in Japan.

On August 2, 2012, the original video animation (OVA) adaptation Corpse Party: Missing Footage was released as part of a limited edition release of Corpse Party: Sweet Sachiko's Hysteric Birthday Bash for the PSP. A multi-episode sequel OVA titled Corpse Party: Tortured Souls was announced on the same day.

A live-action film adaptation was released on August 1, 2015.
