= Dear me, I was... =

2025 video game

- Developer: Arc System Works
- Publisher: Arc System Works
- Director: Maho Taguchi
- Producer: Ryohei Endo
- Artist: Taisuke Kanasaki
- Composer: Satoshi Okubo
- Platforms: Nintendo Switch 2; Android; iOS; Nintendo Switch; Windows
- Release: Nintendo Switch 2: WW: July 31, 2025; Android, iOS, Switch, Windows: WW: February 12, 2026
- Genre: Adventure
- Mode: Single-player

Dear me, I was... is a 2025 adventure game developed and published by Arc System Works. Released worldwide for the Nintendo Switch 2 on July 31, 2025, it features a textless story that follows the perspective of an unnamed woman across multiple stages of her life. Versions for Android, iOS, Nintendo Switch, and Windows were released on February 12, 2026.

== Plot ==
The game follows the story of an unnamed woman throughout various stages of her life, and is divided between nine chapters. The story starts with the protagonist enjoying a day at the park with her parents. Once the girl’s father dies in a traffic accident, her mother gives her a notebook and a box of crayons, which were a gift from her late father. The girl draws her father surrounded by bubbles – a memory from their days at the park.

During her teens, the protagonist attends an art school, where she meets a peer, and starts painting by her side. The two start being friends as she gives the protagonist a painting set. During a trip to the beach, the protagonist and her friend pick up two seashells as they run towards the ocean.

One day, the protagonist’s friend tells her about an art contest, and she starts painting a draft, unaware that her friend is also participating. Once she sees that her friend won by submitting a painting of her by the beach, she runs away feeling betrayed and stores away her painting materials.

In her adulthood, the protagonist starts working an office job. Coming home one day, she opens a letter containing photos of her family and parents’ wedding. The protagonist then goes on a date with a photographer. As they go on more dates, the two eventually start a relationship. The two go on a date at the beach, where the photographer takes a picture of her by the ocean.

One night, the photographer proposes marriage to the protagonist. Looking through the window, she looks across the street to see an ad for her ex-friend’s art exhibition and declines the photographer's proposal.

At the park, the protagonist meets a kid and draws a bear and a rabbit on the ground with her. At home, the protagonist opens up the box where she had previously stored away her painting materials. The protagonist visits her mother, who is bedridden in a hospital, and the protagonist notices her old drawing of her late father surrounded by bubbles. Once her mother passes away, she adds a portrait of her to the same drawing, showing the contrast between her drawing skills at the two stages of her life.

At another time, the protagonist is sitting on a bench at the park, when she hears a cat meowing beneath her. She notices that the cat is pregnant, and takes it to an animal clinic, where the cat gives birth to two kittens. The protagonist then adopts the cat, and she draws multiple sketches of it and its two babies.

After some time, the protagonist sees a gallery on the street and recognizes the photo that the photographer took of her at the beach, and the two meet up over coffee. The protagonist draws a sketch of the photographer and gives it to him. The protagonist, now an elderly woman, receives a letter from the photographer, and the two start sending letters to each other. The protagonist then learns of the photographer’s passing in a plane crash, and visits his grave, where she meets a family member of his. He gives her a notebook, where she sees he kept the drawing she gave him. She colors and frames the drawing.

In an epilogue, the protagonist looks through her notebook once more, where the events told across the game are framed as sketches. She then writes the phrase “Dear me, I was…”, and closes the notebook.

The protagonist hears a knock on the door as her friend from art school comes into her room, carrying a suitcase that has the seashell she picked up on their visit to the beach. The two look at the memories of her life, depicted as drawings hung up on the wall.

== Development and release ==
Dear me, I was... was announced for the Nintendo Switch 2 during an Arc System Works Showcase that was broadcast on YouTube on June 26, 2025, with the release scheduled for July 31, 2025. The game was directed by Maho Taguchi, with art direction by Taisuke Kanasaki, who previously worked on Cing's Another Code series (and its remake, Another Code: Recollection), Hotel Dusk series and Chase: Cold Case Investigations - Distant Memories. The game is a textless adventure game that features rotoscoped animation. This marks Kanasaki's return to this style of animation which he last used for the 2010 Nintendo DS title, Last Window: The Secret of Cape West. The game was developed targeting a demographic of older women, and is designed to "make the player feel a bit more positive while playing"..

A Nintendo Switch version was announced at Tokyo Game Show on September 27, 2025, with a release date announced later.

The game's credits song, "Strange Journey", features vocals by ITSUKA and was released on streaming services the same day as the release of the game. Alongside news of the Switch port, the original soundtrack was released on streaming services on September 27, 2025.

== Reception ==
Reception

Aggregate scores
Aggregator	Score
Metacritic	76/100
OpenCritic	71% recommend

Review scores
Publication	Score
Nintendo Life	8/10
Nintendo World Report	8/10

Dear me, I was... received "generally favorable" reviews from critics, according to the review aggregation website Metacritic. Fellow review aggregator OpenCritic assessed that the game received strong approval, being recommended by 71% of critics. Ethan Zack of Nintendo Life praised the game's art, story, and soundtrack, though criticized the interactive sections and overall short length.
