= Rumiko Varnes =

American voice actress

- Born: Rumiko Varnes; Los Angeles, California, United States
- Other name: Rumiko Barnes
- Education: University of California, Los Angeles
- Alma mater: International Christian University
- Occupations: Voice actress; singer
- Years active: 1985–present
- Children: 1
- Website: www.rumikovarnes.com

Rumiko Varnes is an American voice actress of Japanese descent and is known to speak fluent Japanese. She is best known for her work in video games franchises such as Clock Tower, Tekken series, Unison: Rebels of Rhythm & Dance, Tekken 5, Chaos Break, Hard Edge, Shining Force Neo, Tekken 6, Blaster Master: Blasting Again and Pokkén Tournament.

== Early life ==
Rumiko was born in Los Angeles, California and she attended University of California, Los Angeles later she majored in linguistics. Then she went to Japan as a foreign exchange student to study at International Christian University at Tokyo and studied linguistic psychology.

== Career ==
She was a student when she made her debut in The Dagger of Kamui as Chiomapp. Rumiko also voices commercials along with radio shows in Japanese and she is associated with Funimation.

== Personal life ==
Rumiko lives at Los Angeles, California and Rumiko is half-Japanese also she works as a bilingual narrator. Rumiko is married and has a daughter who also did the motion capturing for Laura in Konami's popular horror video game Silent Hill 2.

== Filmography ==
=== Anime series ===
List of English dubbing performances in anime series
| Year | Title | Role | Notes |
|---|---|---|---|
| 1995 | Soar High! Isami | Isami Hanaoka | |
| 2003 | Doraemon's English World | Nobita Nobi / Shizuka Minamoto / Tamako Nobi / Emily / Female Worker | |
| 2011 | Detective Conan | Minerva Glass | Eps. 616–621 |
| 2012 | Little Charo: Tohoku-hen | Sachi | |
| 2012 | Arashi no Yoru ni | Mii | |
| 2014 | My Neighbor Seki | Singer | |
| 2019 | Ultra Galaxy Fight | Ultrawoman Grigio | |
| 2020 | Ultra Galaxy Fight: The Absolute Conspiracy | Ultrawoman Grigio / Ultraman Justice | |
| 2021 | Phantasy Star Online 2 Comic | Makino / Nekonomiya | |
| 2022 | Ultra Galaxy Fight: The Destined Crossroad | Sora / Ultraman Justice / Ultrawoman Grigio | 7 episodes |
| 2023 | Ultraman Regulos: First Mission | Sora | |

=== Animation series ===
List of voice performances in animation
| Year | Title | Role | Notes |
|---|---|---|---|
| 2014–2019 | Fastening Days | Kei / Girl 1 | |

=== Film ===
List of voice performances in direct-to-video and films
| Year | Title | Role | Notes | Source |
|---|---|---|---|---|
| 1985 | The Dagger of Kamui | Chiomapp | | |
| 1996 | Idol Janshi Suchie-Pai | Bully Queen / Cecil Telinger / Milk / Milkypai / Patient / Pinzu Monster / Shiho Katagiri | | |
| 2002 | Aquatic Language | Waitress | | |
| 2011 | Red Riding Hood | Village lady | Credited as Rumiko Barnes | |
| 2017 | Shimajiro and the Rainbow Oasis | Shimajiro Shimano | English version | |

=== Video games ===
List of voice performances in video games
| Year | Title | Role | Notes |
|---|---|---|---|
| 1996 | Clock Tower | Jennifer Simpson | PlayStation |
| 1998 | Hard Edge | Rachel Howard | PlayStation |
| 1999 | Countdown Vampires | Alicia S. Tiller / Automated System Voice / Female Casino Patron / Additional Voices | PlayStation |
| 2000 | Chaos Break | Mitsuki | PlayStation |
| 2000 | Shenmue | Others / Additional voices | Dreamcast |
| 2000 | Blaster Master: Blasting Again | Elfie Frudnick | PlayStation |
| 2000 | Unison: Rebels of Rhythm & Dance | Trill / June Baby | PlayStation 2 |
| 2000 | Silpheed: The Lost Planet | Ship Dispatcher / Computer voice | PlayStation 2 |
| 2001 | Fatal Frame | Miku Hinasaki | PlayStation 2 |
| 2001 | Beach Spikers | Female Volleyball Player | GameCube |
| 2002 | Bloody Roar Extreme | Shina 'Marvel' Gado | GameCube |
| 2003 | Mega Man X7 | Alia | PlayStation 2 |
| 2003 | Spy Fiction | Alice Coleman / Kelly Wong | PlayStation 2 |
| 2003 | Glass Rose | Ayako Yoshinodou / Tsuyako Sawamatsu | PlayStation 2 |
| 2003 | Bloody Roar 4 | Alice Nonomura | PlayStation 2 |
| 2004 | Firefighter F.D.18 | Emilie Arvin | English version |
| 2004 | Graffiti Kingdom | Pixel | PlayStation 2 |
| 2004 | Michigan: Report from Hell | Paula Orton / Carrie Graham | PlayStation 2 |
| 2004 | Taiko: Drum Master | Drum Master / Drummer / Announcer / Additional voices | PlayStation 2 |
| 2004 | Tekken 5 | Christie Monteiro / Jane | PlayStation 2 |
| 2005 | Shining Force Neo | Meryl | PlayStation 2 |
| 2005 | The Rub Rabbits! | Genius Girl | Nintendo DS |
| 2005 | Musashi: Samurai Legend | Clochette | PlayStation 2 |
| 2005 | Tekken 5: Dark Resurrection | Christie Monteiro | PlayStation 3 |
| 2006 | Elebits | Ana / Mom | Wii |
| 2007 | Tekken 6 | Christie Monteiro | Xbox 360 |
| 2007 | Mega Man ZX Advent | Pandora | Nintendo DS |
| 2009 | Arc Rise Fantasia | Adele Nevanlinna | Wii |
| 2011 | Tekken Tag Tournament 2 | Christie Monteiro | Xbox 360 |
| 2013 | Tekken Revolution | Christie Monteiro | PlayStation 3 |
| 2015 | Pokkén Tournament | Chloe | Nintendo Switch |
| 2015 | BlazBlue: Central Fiction | System Voice | PlayStation 4 |
| 2017 | Pokkén Tournament DX | Chloe | Wii U |
| 2019 | Last Cloudia | Dabourne / Leena | PC |
| 2020 | Mega Man Zero/ZX Legacy Collection | Pandora | PlayStation 4 |
| 2021 | Castlevania: Grimoire of Souls | Enemies | macOS |
| 2025 | Inazuma Eleven: Victory Road | Antonia Felicier / Maribelle Flanmir / Yelenda Poplawska / Terra Hillcroft | PlayStation 5 |
