= Rika Suzuki =

Japanese video game designer

- 鈴木 理華
- Born: Yokohama, Kanagawa, Japan
- Occupation: Video game designer
- Writing career
- Years active: 1984–present
- Genre: Adventure
- Notable works: Another Code series; Kyle Hyde saga

Rika Suzuki (Japanese: 鈴木 理華, Hepburn: Suzuki Rika) is a Japanese writer and composer. She was a co-founder of the defunct Japanese companies Riverhillsoft and Cing. Suzuki began her career in 1984 as an assistant on Newtron. She is considered a pioneer of the adventure video game genre in Japan, and has mainly contributed as a scenario writer for the games the companies had produced. Suzuki is best known for her work on Another Code series and Kyle Hyde series.

== Career ==
An early pioneer in the adventure video game genre in Japan, Suzuki had begun her career at the Sanrio design department and eventually co-founded a company of her own known as Riverhillsoft, with president Kazuhiro Okazaki in 1983. After producing several early adventure titles, such as Kuronekosou Souzoku Satsujin Jiken, she rose to prominence following the release of the J.B. Harold video game series in the mid-80s and 90s. Suzuki aided in the founding of the Japanese video game developer Cing, with Takuya Miyagawa in 1999. She had written and designed the Another Code and Hotel Dusk franchises for Nintendo. Following the bankruptcy of Cing in 2010, she continued writing online novels at Bellwood Inc., a company she formed in April 2009. Suzuki had wrote the scenario for a mobile role-playing game (RPG) called Black Rose Suspects in 2017. Since then, she has worked on a few other titles including Another Code: Recollection (2024) and Dark Auction (2026).

== Works ==
- Door Door mkII (1984) – Editing
- Newtron (1984) – Assistant
- Val Trad (1985) – Graphics
- Juggler Stone (1985) – Graphics, programming
- Dragon Quest (1986) – Assistant
- Dragon Quest II (1987) – Assistant
- Kiss of Murder (1987) – Director
- Manhattan Requiem (1987) – Director
- Dragon Quest III (1988) – Assistant
- Burai: Jōkan (1989) – Producer
- Murder Club (1990) – Game design, scenario
- Tōdō Ryūnosuke Detective Diary: Golden Compass (1991) – Game design, scenario
- Princess Minerva (1992) – Producer
- Digital Comic Patlabor: Chapter of Griffon (1993) – Producer
- Princess Minerva (1994) – Producer
- J.B. Harold: Blue Chicago Blues (1995) – Planning, screenplay
- Glass Rose (2003)
- Another Code: Two Memories (2005) – Game design, scenario
- Hotel Dusk: Room 215 (2007) – Game design, scenario
- Another Code: R – A Journey into Lost Memories (2009) – Game design, scenario
- Again (2009) – Scenario supervisor
- Last Window: The Secret of Cape West (2010) – Game design, scenario
- Another Code: Recollection (2024) – Supervisor
- Dark Auction (2026) – Scenario
