= Little King's Story =

2009 video game

- Developers: Wii: Cing; Town Factory; PlayStation Vita; Konami Digital Entertainment
- Publishers: Wii: PAL: Rising Star Games; NA: Xseed Games; JP: Marvelous Entertainment; PlayStation Vita; Konami Digital Entertainment; Microsoft Windows; Xseed Games
- Director: Yoshiro Kimura
- Producer: Yoshiro Kimura
- Designers: Tomo Ikeda; Yoshihisa Shimokawa
- Programmer: Tomohiro Misei
- Artists: Shinichi Matsumoto; Hideo Minaba (character); Kazuyuki Kurashima (monster)
- Writers: Tomo Ikeda; Taro Hirai
- Composer: Yutaka Minobe
- Platforms: Wii, PlayStation Vita, Microsoft Windows
- Release: Wii: AU: April 22, 2009; EU: April 24, 2009; NA: July 21, 2009; JP: September 3, 2009; PlayStation Vita: JP: March 29, 2012; EU: September 27, 2012; AU: October 2, 2012; NA: October 2, 2012; Microsoft Windows: WW: August 5, 2016
- Genres: Real-time strategy, life simulation, role-playing
- Mode: Single-player

Little King's Story (Note: Known in Japan as Ōsama Monogatari (Japanese: 王様物語; King Story)) is a real-time strategy life simulation role-playing video game co-developed by Cing and Town Factory for the Nintendo Wii. The game was published by Rising Star Games in Australia on April 22, 2009, and Europe on April 24, 2009, by Xseed Games in North America on July 21, 2009, and by Marvelous Entertainment in Japan on September 3, 2009.

The player character is a timid boy who has found a mysterious crown which gives him the power to charm people and make them follow orders. As king of the village, his goal is to expand it and make his subjects happy. The design of the game combines various simulation elements as well as real-time and adventure elements. A Microsoft Windows version of the original Wii game was released on August 5, 2016. This port was published by Xseed Games, the North American publisher for the original Wii release.

== Gameplay ==
=== Building ===
In Little King's Story, the player controls the new king, Corobo. With his undeniable charm and control, he issues various orders to citizens. Though starting in what is essentially a cluttered field, the player begins to upgrade the kingdom of Alpoko through activities such as treasure hunting and fighting. Within a few hours, the player is able to purchase and institute various buildings, training facilities, and other castle commodities, while the population steadily grows. All important stats, such as population and finances, are tracked through an easily accessible menu system.

When walking around, Corobo is able to select any citizen to follow him. Afterward, commands can be issued to each citizen, including actions such as digging and fighting. While a group of people can follow him, commands can only be issued to one citizen at a time. Early in the game, the player has the option to buy a podium that allows selected citizens to be gathered without walking around and searching for them.

Corobo's followers are initially very limited and weak in capability; however, this is quickly corrected when training facilities are built. At that point, the player can send his citizens into the buildings and change them into a different type of worker. The game offers different jobs for civilians, including but not limited to soldier, carpenter, peasant, farmer, and hunter. Each job allows citizens different capabilities and weaknesses. For example, a farmer is exceptional at field work and digging, but is a poor fighter, while soldiers are strong but lack the ability to traverse environmental obstacles. Corobo is also able to converse with his followers whenever he desires, though it usually only produces small talk.

Outside of the main story, side quests are widely available via a suggestion box in the town square. Courtesy of varied civilian complaints, Corobo can accept missions that range from fetch quests to hunting and fighting that allow him to keep his public satisfied and increase finances. On some days, players are actually unable to do much due to events such as celebrations. After conquering a rival land, for example, the next day a massive parade is held in Alpoko. During this day, commanding people is a futile effort as they are too busy enjoying themselves. Saving progress can only be done in the kingdom.

=== Adventuring ===
Along with building and fortifying the kingdom, adventuring and questing constitute the bulk of Little King's Story. Alpoko is only a small portion of the world, which the player must explore in order to advance the plot, collect valuable treasures and bounty, and conquer the seven rival kingdoms. It is here where having variously classed citizens comes in handy, as the player encounters various environmental obstacles, including things such as gaps in the land, caved in areas, and of course a wide slew of dangerous enemies, including boss battles.

Corobo attacks with his sceptre, but his attacks are extremely weak. Instead, he must have others do all fighting for him. All civilians and Corobo possess a set amount of life; should a civilian lose all of his he will die, while if the king dies it is game over. Scattered throughout the land are little hot springs that allow the player to replenish his life; however, in order to save and collect bounty, the player must travel back to Alpoko first.

== Plot ==
Corobo is a lonely boy who enjoys playing with his toys in his dark and cluttered room. One day, while chasing out a group of rats, he wanders into a mysterious land and finds a crown. Upon putting it on, he discovers that the crown allows him to give people orders with which they cannot refuse. Corobo is also appointed the ruler of a little kingdom known as Alpoko, accompanied by Howser the Bull Knight, his friends, Liam and Verde (who become Minister of Anything and Record Keeper, respectively), and a slew of obedient citizens.

After building up Alpoko, Corobo is challenged by a neighbouring kingdom, which he defeats and conquers, gaining additional territory and a princess. Howser then encourages Corobo to unify the remaining rival kingdoms under his rule, each led by an eccentric king with distinct abilities and themes. During this campaign, Corobo encounters Skinny Ray, who warns that the world is approaching destruction, as shown by increasingly severe earthquakes, though his claims are initially ignored. After unifying the world and gaining several more princesses, the earthquakes intensify to an apocalyptic scale, prompting Corobo to construct a flying machine in order to discover their cause. Shortly before departing, he learns that his kingdom has gone bankrupt and that his companions insist on accompanying him.

Upon choosing one of the princesses or Verde to accompany him, Corobo travels into space and discovers that his universe exists within a box, and that its inhabitants are microscopic in scale. It is revealed that many characters represent fantastical versions of people known to the box’s owner, such as Howser, who reflects a deceased grandfather, and several bosses that parody personal influences. After confronting a group of rats responsible for the earthquakes, Corobo finds himself alone as a giant boy awakens and pursues him. A final reveal shows the giant to be Corobo himself from the beginning of the story, leaving the nature of the world and events deliberately ambiguous.

== Development ==
Little King's Story began development under the working title "Project O". The game was executive produced by Yasuhiro Wada, creator of the Story of Seasons series, who located a development studio in Fukuoka and invited Yoshiro Kimura to serve as producer for the project. After joining the project, Kimura found that no director, planner, or character designers had yet been assigned, and he subsequently assembled the core development team, including Norikazu Yasunaga for game design, Youichi Kawaguchi as director, and Hideo Minaba and Kazuyuki Kurashima as character and monster designers, respectively.

Kimura had previously worked on cult titles such as Moon: Remix RPG Adventure and Chulip, and came up with the concept of Little King's Story. Kimura states that his inspiration for the game came from The Little Prince, a storybook he read as a child. His goal the first year in development was to create a real-time strategy game with easy controls, specifically one that used the Wii Remote.

Little King's Story, as "Project O", was first shown at the Tokyo Game Show in 2007. The official website held a "UMA" (Unidentified Mysterious Animal) contest, where people were able to send a sketch of a monster they created. The first prize winner would have their "UMA" star as an in-game character, and 99 other winners would have the artwork displayed in the game. Six of the creatures that won were "Bruno", "Flummex", "Octoknight", "Pirabbit", "Ninjūn", and "Kabelle".

=== Rereleases ===
On August 24, 2011, it was announced that Marvelous Entertainment was working on a reimagining to Little King's Story titled Ō to Maō to 7 Nin no Himegimi Tachi ~Shin Ōsama Monogatari, (Note: Japanese: 王と魔王と7人の姫君たち～新・王様物語～; The King, The Demon King and the 7 Princesses: New King Story) published by Konami for the PlayStation Vita. According to Famitsu, the game would have "love elements, along with new visual stylings for its characters."

In August 2016, Little King's Story was ported to PC via Steam by Marvelous, Inc. The PC version received a mixed reception at launch due to technical issues including performance problems and controller support, but a major update released in February 2017 significantly improved performance, graphical options, and gamepad controls.

=== Audio ===
The game's music is composed and arranged by Yutaka Minobe. Yoko Shimomura, famous for her music in the Kingdom Hearts series, also contributed an arrangement of Boléro for the first trailer of the game, which debuted at Tokyo Game Show 2007. Sound and voice effects were handled by Vanpool. The game's main background music comes from Beethoven's Symphony No. 9 in D minor, Opus 125, 4th movement from 9:00 to about 10:20.

== Reception ==
Reception

Aggregate scores
Aggregator	Score
GameRankings	(Wii) 86% (PSV) 69%
Metacritic	(Wii) 87/100 (PSV) 70/100

Review scores
Publication	Score
Edge	9/10
Eurogamer	8/10
Official Nintendo Magazine	92%

Little King's Story received critical acclaim by many reviewers. It received 92% from Official Nintendo Magazine, a 9/10 in UK magazine Edge and an 8/10 from Eurogamer. The game also won a Satellite Award for Outstanding Puzzle/Strategy Game.

As of November 13, 2009, Little King's Story had sold 26,000 units in Japan, 37,000 units in North America, and 67,000 units in Europe. Despite modest initial sales, Rising Star's Product Manager Yen Hau stated in 2010 that the title "is still selling well to this day, [which is] something [that] doesn't happen often to video games," citing Rising Star's satisfaction with sales. Kimura explained, "We are planning to make a sequel to Little King's Story, like Super Little King's Story, but we're still in the idea phase." However, Cing has declared bankruptcy since then; this does not mean studio closure, but rather that they will be tightening their financial belt. Regardless of Cing's closing, Marvelous Entertainment currently owns the full intellectual property rights to Little King's Story. Both Kimura and Wada left Marvelous and joined Grasshopper Manufacture in 2010.
