= Rikiya Koyama =

Japanese voice actor and narrator

- 小山 力也
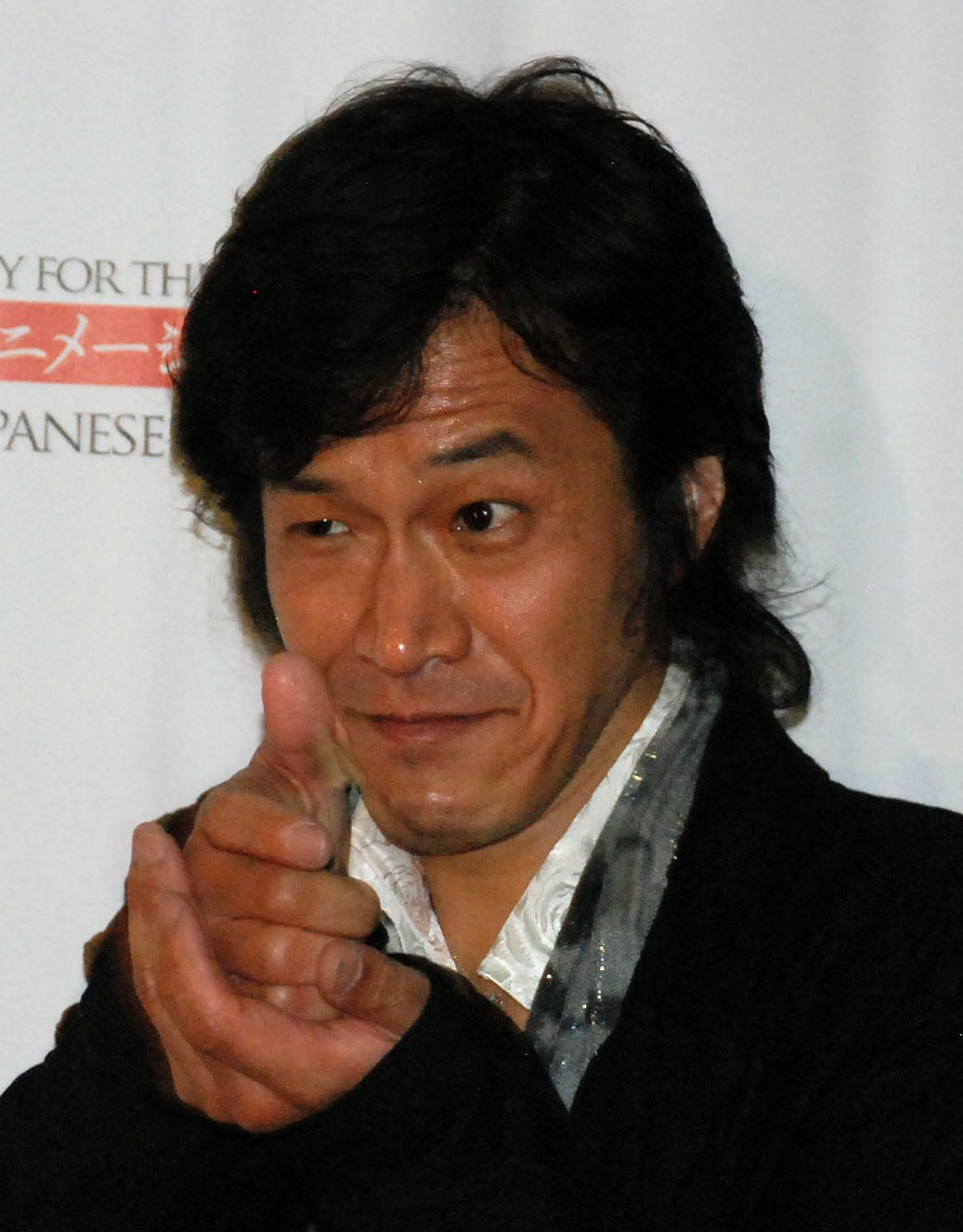
- Koyama at Anime Expo 2012
- Born: December 18, 1963 (age 62); Kyoto, Japan
- Other names: Ricky (リッキー, Rikkī); Riki (りきちゃん, Riki-chan)
- Occupations: Actor; voice actor; narrator
- Years active: 1987–present
- Agent: Haiyuza Theatre Company
- Height: 173 cm (5 ft 8 in)

Rikiya Koyama (Japanese: 小山 力也, Hepburn: Koyama Rikiya; born December 18, 1963) is a Japanese actor, voice actor and narrator currently affiliated with Haiyuza Theatre Company. He has done popular voicing roles in Hajime no Ippo, Utawarerumono, Kamen no Maid Guy and Yakuza, and has become well known for voicing Yamato in Naruto Shippuden, Ging Freecss in Hunter X Hunter and Kogoro Mouri (second voice, 2009–present) in Case Closed. In addition, he is known for voicing rather tall or massive inhuman villains like Coyote Starrk in Bleach, Fukuro in Fairy Tail and Deep Sea King in One Punch Man. He is the official dub-over artist of George Clooney, Kiefer Sutherland, Dwayne Johnson and Ma Dong-seok. In addition, he dubbed many roles of Denzel Washington, Keanu Reeves and Guy Pearce.

== Biography ==
By the time Koyama was in high school, his voice had already taken on the quality it has today, and when he answered the phone at the time, his own aunt would sometimes mistake him for his father. After attending Ritsumeikan Junior and Senior High School, Koyama entered the law department at Ritsumeikan University in 1982. He became a member of Ritsumeikan Art Theatre Company. At the time, he was performing the works of Minoru Betsuyaku and Kōhei Tsuka. After graduating from college in 1987, he moved from Kyoto to Tokyo to study theater at Toho Gakuen College of Drama and Music. He was a member of the swimming club and had no qualms about wearing a swimsuit. After graduation, he joined the Haiyuza Theatre Company and made his debut as an actor in Kamen Rider Black RX in 1989. In RX, he performed most of the action scenes himself, including wire fu and napalm explosions, except for some dangerous scenes. Due to his connection with the producers of the series, Nagafumi Hori and Susumu Yoshikawa, he often made guest appearances in the Metal Hero Series that they were in charge of.

Koyama made his debut as a voice actor in ER and initially focused on dubbing, but since the 2000s he has also appeared in many anime and video games. In addition, Utawarerumono Radio led to a surge in radio programs in which he worked with various female voice actors. In anime, he plays many austere characters, but he covers the gamut from serious to gag, from good guys to cold-hearted villains, comical roles to dynamic ones, and from lustful characters like Kristofor in the game Infinite Undiscovery to the aloof and free-spirited role of Leonard in the Angelique series. Since he has been working more as a voice actor, Koyama has not made many appearances as an actor. In 2009, he was asked to play the role of Joe of Haze in Kamen Rider Decade, the same role he played in RX, but he turned it down due to his age and discomfort with the image of the role.

Koyama has also been active as a stage actor, actively participating in stage performances in Europe (England, France, the Netherlands, Romania, Italy, and Russia) since around 2000, and his performance as Antonio in The Merchant of Venice in 2001 won the Outstanding Performance Award at the 9th Yomiuri Theater Awards. In 2011, Koyama won the Kei Tomiyama Memorial Award at the 5th Seiyu Awards.

Koyama's role of Jack Bauer in 24 is one of his most popular roles. At the end of 2010, he met Kiefer at the 24 final season campaign and fan thanksgiving event.

== Filmography ==
=== Television animation ===
Year	Title	Role	Other notes
1998	Pokémon	Dr. Proctor	
2000	Hajime no Ippo	Mamoru Takamura	
2000	Detective Conan	Saku Norifumi (ep. 199–200)	
2001	Figure 17	D.D./Daisuke Domoto	
2001	Soul Taker	Zabo (ep 6)	
2002	Detective Conan	Kiyama Tomonori (ep. 282–283)	
2002	Magical Shopping Arcade Abenobashi	Eutus, Abe	
2003	D.N.Angel	Police Chief Hiwatari	
2003	Croquette!	Bagu	
2003	Astro Boy	Katari	
2003	Ninja Scroll: The Series	Jubei Kibagami	
2004	Fafner in the Azure	Seiichirou Kaname	
2004	Ghost in the Shell: Stand Alone Complex	Hideo Kuze	
2004	Monster	Peter Jurgens	
2005	Akagi	Nangō	
2005	Eureka Seven	Norb	
2005	Eyeshield 21	Gen "Musashi" Takekura	
2005	Full Metal Panic! The Second Raid	Belfangan Grouseaux	
2005	Noein – Mou Hitori no Kimi e	Kuina	
2005	Pataliro Saiyuki!	Sa Gojō	
2005	Speed Grapher	Genba Ryougoku	
2006	Crash B-Daman	Jubee Sanada	
2006	Buso Renkin	Victor	
2006	Ayakashi Ayashi	Abi	
2006	Fate/stay night	Kiritsugu Emiya	
2006	Honey and Clover II	Mac Carlos	
2006	Naruto	Hotarubi	
2006	Taiyou no Mokushiroku	Chan	
2006	Utawarerumono	Hakuoro	
2006	Witchblade	Reiji Takayama	
2006	Yomigaeru Sora – Rescue Wings	Junzō Kuroki	
2007	Bleach	Coyote Starrk	
2007	Naruto: Shippuden	Yamato	
2007	Kaze no Stigma	Genma Kannagi	
2007	Koi suru Tenshi Angelique ~Kagayaki no Ashita~	Leonard	
2007	Kaiji	Nakayama	
2007	Hero Tales	Koyō Mougai	
2008	Soul Eater	Shinigami	
2008	Ga-Rei: Zero	Kudo Kuzuno	
2008	Rin ~Daughters of Mnemosyne~	Ihika	
2008	Mōryō no Hako	Sasagawa	
2008	Akane-Iro ni Somaru Saka	Sejirō Sugishita	
2008	Kamen no Maid Guy	Kogarashi	
2008	Blue Dragon	Voice of the Heavenly World	
2008	Neuro: Supernatural Detective	Dokuta Kuroo	
2008	Shigofumi: Letters from the Departed	Mikawa Kirameki	
2008	Yatterman	Chuck Pauer	
2008	Golgo 13	Blue-Eye Zalath	
2009	Hajime no Ippo: New Challenger	Takamura Mamoru	
2009	Spice and Wolf II	Marc Cole	
2009	Aoi Bungaku Series	K	
2009	Detective Conan	Kogoro Mori (ep. 553–present)	Replaced Akira Kamiya
2009	Rideback	Tenshirō Okakura	
2009	Souten Kouro	Lu Bu	
2009	Umineko no Naku Koro ni	Rudolf Ushiromiya	
2009	Kobato.	Genko	
2010	Durarara!!	Shuji Niekawa	
2010	Katanagatari	Souda Emonzaemon	
2010	Arakawa Under the Bridge	Seki Ichinomiya	
2010	Fairy Tail	Fukuro	
2010	The Legend of the Legendary Heroes	Lieral Lieutolu	
2010	Marvel Anime: Iron Man	Wolverine/Logan	
2010	Rainbow: Nisha Rokubou no Shichinin	Rokurouta Sakuragi	
2010	Shinryaku! Ika Musume	Ayumi Tokita's father	
2011	Fate/Zero	Kiritsugu Emiya	
2011	Last Exile: Fam, The Silver Wing	Yashbal Anand	
2011	Nura: Rise of the Yokai Clan: Demon Capital	Abe no Seimei	
2011	Marvel Anime: Wolverine	Wolverine/Logan	
2011	Marvel Anime: X-Men	Wolverine/Logan	
2011	Marvel Anime: Blade	Wolverine/Logan	
2011	Hyouge Mono	Oda Nobunaga	
2011	Shinryaku!? Ika Musume	Ayumi Tokita's father	
2012	Hunter × Hunter	Ging Freecss	2011 series
2012	Blast of Tempest	Samon Kusaribe	
2012	Ginga e Kickoff!!	Masaru Hanamisha	
2012	Kingdom	Wang Qi	
2012	Muv-Luv Alternative - Total Eclipse	Ibrahim Doğulu	
2012	Tantei Opera Milky Holmes: Act 2	Handsome Buta	
2012	World War Blue	General Alex	
2012	Daily Lives of High School Boys	Hidenori's Dad	
2013	Dog & Scissors	Tōji Nakahara, Daimon Hotokezaka	
2013	Hajime no Ippo: Rising	Takamura Mamoru	
2013	High School DxD New	Azazel	
2013	Pokémon Origins	Giovanni	
2013	Devil Survivor 2: The Animation	Ronaldo Kuriki	
2014	Space Dandy	Le Flea Brothers	
2014	Black Bullet	Kagetane Hiruko	
2014	Nobunaga Concerto	Shibata Katsuie	
2014	Parasyte -the maxim-	Yamagishi	
2014	Sengoku Basara: End of Judgement	Kuroda Kanbei	
2014	Terra Formars	Donatello K. Davis	
2014	Nanana's Buried Treasure	Jūgo's Father	
2014	Captain Earth	Tsutomu Nishikubo	
2014	Tokyo ESP	Kudo Kuzuno	
2014	Nanana's Buried Treasure	Jūgo's Father	
2014	No-Rin	Hajime Menjo	
2014	Argevollen	Toshikazu Cayenne	
2015	Blood Blockade Battlefront	Klaus Von Reinhertz	
2015	Food Wars!: Shokugeki no Soma	Jōichirō Yukihira	
2015	Heavy Object	Seawax	
2015	The Heroic Legend of Arslan	Lucian	
2015	High School DxD BorN	Azazel	
2015	My Monster Secret	Genjirō Shiragami	
2015	Lupin the Third Part IV	Cesare Albertini	
2015	One-Punch Man	Sea King	
2015	Seiyu's Life!	Himself	
2015	Garo: Crimson Moon	Watanabe no Tsuna	
2015	Ushio and Tora	Tora	
2015	One Piece	Galley, Kyros (continued till 2016)	
2015	God Eater	Johannes von Schicksal (continued till 3/26/2016 when episode 13 was aired)	
2015	Anti-Magic Academy: The 35th Test Platoon	Orochi Kusagani	
2016	Ajin: Demi-Human	Firefighter	
2016	Alderamin on the Sky	Solvenares Igsem	
2016	All Out!!	Tadakazu Taira	
2016	Bungo Stray Dogs	Fukuzawa Yukichi	
2016	Berserk	Mozgus	
2016	Beyblade Burst	Kaiza "Xhaka" Xhakuenji	
2016	Danganronpa 3: The End of Hope's Peak High School – Side: Despair	Jin Kirigiri	
2016	Food Wars! Shokugeki no Soma: The Second Plate	Jōichirō Yukihira	
2016	The Disastrous Life of Saiki K.	Tom	
2016	Gate	Shunya Kengun	
2016–2018	Chi's Sweet Adventure	Kuroino	
2017	Gintama	Neptune Shoukaku	
2017	ID-0	Grayman	
2017	Hina Logi: From Luck & Logic	Strafansky Yelistratova	
2017	Beyblade Burst God	Kaiza "Xhaka" Xhakuenji	
2017	Magical Circle Guru Guru	Gochinko (ep. 4 – 5, 10)	
2017	UQ Holder!	Jack Rakan	
2017	Altair: A Record of Battles	Corentin Pineau	
2017	The Laughing Salesman NEW	Ashi Yumemi (ep. 8)	
2017	Digimon Universe: App Monsters	Dantemon (ep. 24)	
2017	Food Wars! Shokugeki no Soma: The Third Plate	Jōichirō Yukihira	
2018	Killing Bites	Reiichi Shidō	
2018	Future Card Buddyfight	Demon Lord Dragon, Batzz	
2018	The Seven Deadly Sins: Revival of the Commandments	Zaratras	
2018	Beyblade Burst Chōzetsu	Kaiza "Xhaka" Xhakuenji	
2018	Back Street Girls	Jin Takamura	
2018	Karakuri Circus	Narumi Katō	
2018	Angolmois: Record of Mongol Invasion	Onitakemaru	
2018	Zoids Wild	Foie gras	
2019	Food Wars! Shokugeki no Soma: The Fourth Plate	Jōichirō Yukihira	
2020	The Millionaire Detective Balance: Unlimited	Katsuhiro Takei	
2020	Super HxEros	Narrator	
2020	Sleepy Princess in the Demon Castle	Majiro the Hedgehog	
2020	The Gymnastics Samurai	Britney	
2020	Black Clover	Dante Zogratis	
2021	Bungo Stray Dogs Wan!	Fukuzawa Yukichi	
2021	Kiyo in Kyoto: From the Maiko House	Onii-san	
2021	Mushoku Tensei: Jobless Reincarnation	Perugius Dola	
2021	Cestvs: The Roman Fighter	Zafar	
2021	Vivy: Fluorite Eye's Song	Antonio	
2021	That Time I Got Reincarnated as a Slime Season 2	Dagruel	
2022	Police in a Pod	Tamotsu Hōjō	
2022	Saiyuki Reload: Zeroin	Gatti Nenehawk	
2022	Deaimon	Heigo Irino	
2022	The Eminence in Shadow	Orba	
2022	Detective Conan: The Culprit Hanzawa	Kogoro Mori	
2022	Urusei Yatsura	Lum's dad	
2023	Golden Kamuy 4th Season	Niheiji Nozawa	
2023	Classroom for Heroes	King Gilgamesh	
2023	Undead Unluck	Billy	
2023	Four Knights of the Apocalypse	Pellegarde	
2023	A Playthrough of a Certain Dude's VRMMO Life	Zetan	
2024	Magilumiere Magical Girls Inc.	Kōji Shigemoto	
2025	Ishura 2nd Season	Mele the Horizon's Roar	
2025	#Compass 2.0: Combat Providence Analysis System	Luciano	
2025	Gachiakuta	Corvus	
2026	Daemons of the Shadow Realm	Right	
2026	My Hero Academia: Vigilantes	Tenma "His Purple Highness" Nakaoji	

=== Original video animation (OVA) ===
- Rurouni Kenshin: Trust & Betrayal (1999): Hijikata Toshizō
- Fushigi Yūgi Eikoden (2001): Shu Tendo
- Hajime no Ippo – Mashiba vs. Kimura (2003): Mamoru Takamura
- Full Metal Panic! The Second Raid (2005): Belfangan Grouseaux
- The Wings of Rean (2005): Shinjirō Sakomizu
- Ghost in the Shell: Stand Alone Complex – Individual Eleven (2006): Hideo Kuze
- Mahou Sensei Negima: Mō Hitotsu no Sekai (2009): Jack Rakan
- Dogs: Bullets & Carnage (2009): Fuyumine
- Akaneiro ni Somaru Saka Hardcore (2009): Sejirō Sugishita
- Mobile Suit Gundam Unicorn (2010): Flaste Schole

=== Original net animation (ONA) ===
- The Way of the Househusband (2021): Senpai Cat
- Pokémon: Hisuian Snow (2022): Alec's Father
- Pluto (2023): Hercules
- Chi's Sweet Summer Vacation (2024): Kuroino
- Disney Twisted-Wonderland the Animation (2025): Mozus Trein

=== Anime films ===
- Vampire Hunter D: Bloodlust (2000): Public Official
- Cowboy Bebop: The Movie (2001): Steve
- Tokyo Godfathers (2003): Bridegroom
- Hajime no Ippo – Champion Road (2003): Mamoru Takamura
- Fullmetal Alchemist the Movie: Conqueror of Shamballa (2005): Rudolf Hess
- JoJo's Bizarre Adventure: Phantom Blood (2007): William A. Zeppeli
- Kite Liberator (2008): Orudo Noguchi
- SD Gundam Sangokuden Brave Battle Warriors (2010): Koshin Gyan
- Detective Conan: Dimensional Sniper (2014): Kogoro Mori
- Saint Seiya: Legend of Sanctuary (2014): Taurus Aldebaran
- Dance with Devils: Fortuna (2017): Nesta
- Bungo Stray Dogs: DEAD APPLE (2018): Yukichi Fukuzawa
- My Hero Academia: Two Heroes (2018): Wolfram
- Psycho-Pass: Sinners of the System (2019): Rodion Matsuki
- Promare (2019): Ignis Ex
- Blackfox (2019): Harold
- Human Lost (2019): Atsugi
- Demon Slayer: Kimetsu no Yaiba the Movie: Infinity Train (2020): Shinjuro Rengoku
- The Tunnel to Summer, the Exit of Goodbyes (2022): Kaoru's father

=== Video games ===
- Glass Rose (2003): Koutaro Katagiri
- Final Fantasy XII (2006): Basch
- JoJo's Bizarre Adventure: Phantom Blood (2006): Will A. Zeppeli
- Fate/stay night (2007): Kiritsugu Emiya
- Musou Orochi: Rebirth of the Demon Lord (2008): Sun Wukong
- Fate/tiger colosseum Upper (2009): Kiritsugu Emiya
- Shin Sangoku Musou: Multi Raid 2 (2010): Shi Huangdi, Sun Wukong
- Yakuza 4 (2010): Taiga Saejima
- Warriors Orochi 3 (2011): Nemea, Sun Wukong
- Ultimate Marvel vs. Capcom 3 (2011): Frank West
- Project X Zone (2012): Frank West
- Yakuza 5 (2012): Taiga Saejima
- Final Fantasy XIV: A Realm Reborn (2013): Cid nan Garlond
- Granblue Fantasy (2014): Soriz, Jack Rakan
- JoJo's Bizarre Adventure: All Star Battle (2013): Yoshikage Kira, "Kosaku Kawajiri"
- Ryū ga Gotoku Ishin! (2014): Nagakura Shinpachi
- Yakuza 0 (2015): Taiga Saejima
- Xenoblade Chronicles X (2015): Douglas
- Fate/Grand Order (2015): EMIYA (Assassin)
- Devil May Cry 4: Special Edition (2015): Credo
- JoJo's Bizarre Adventure: Eyes of Heaven (2015): Yoshikage Kira, "Kosaku Kawajiri"
- #COMPASS (2016): Luciano
- NightCry (2016): Leonard
- Yakuza 6: The Song of Life (2016): Taiga Saejima
- Negimate! UQ Holder!: Magister Negi Magi! 2 (2018) - Jack Rakan
- Warriors Orochi 4 (2018): Sun Wukong
- Dragon Quest XI S: Echoes of an Elusive Age (2019): Hendrik
- Yakuza: Like a Dragon (2020): Taiga Saejima
- Nioh 2 (2020): Saitō Toshimitsu
- Disney Twisted-Wonderland (2020): Mozus Trein
- Jujutsu Kaisen: Phantom Parade (2022): Kensuke Nagino
- Arknights (2022): Młynar
- Like a Dragon Gaiden: The Man Who Erased His Name (2023): Taiga Saejima
- Arknights: Endfield (2026): Da Pan
- Dark Auction (2026): Leonard Crawford
- Marvel Tokon: Fighting Souls (2026): Wolverine

Unknown date

- Ace Combat 6: Fires of Liberation: Marcus "Shamrock" Lampert
- Angelique Etoile: Leonard
- Another Eden: Bertrand
- Armored Core 2: Leos Klein
- Code: Realize ~Sousei no Himegimi~: Jimmy A Arester
- Daemon Bride: Uriel/Dawn
- Detective Conan: Tsuioku no Mirajiyu: Tadaki Kai
- Drakengard 2: Urick
- Eat Lead: The Return of Matt Hazard: Matt Hazard
- Everybody's Golf 5: Nakajima
- Fantasy Earth: Zero: King Huenkel
- Granado Espada (Japanese version): Nar
- Halo 4, Halo 5: Guardians (Japanese version): Master Chief
- Infinite Undiscovery: Kristofor
- Jak II (Japanese version): Torn
- Lego Marvel Super Heroes (Japanese version): Daredevil
- Metroid: Other M: Adam Malkovich
- No More Heroes: Heroes' Paradise: Thunder Ryu
- One Piece World Seeker: Isaac
- Phantasy Star Universe: Leogini Santosa Berafort
- Ryū ga Gotoku Ishin!: (Nagakura Shinpachi)
- Sengoku Basara 3: Kuroda Kanbei
- Shining Resonance: Georg
- Star Ocean: Second Evolution: Gabriel
- Super Robot Wars series: Ricardo Silveira, Gaiou, Shinjirou Sakomizu, Belfangan Grouseaux
- Sword Art Online: Fatal Bullet: Bazalt Joe
- Tales of Innocence: Asura
- Tales of Vesperia: Duke
- Tenchu 4: Rikimaru
- Time Crisis 4: Terrorist Leader
- Too Human (Japanese version): Baldr
- Trauma Center: New Blood: Markus Vaughn
- White Knight Chronicles: Cyrus

=== Tokusatsu roles ===
- Kamen Rider Black RX (1989): Joe of Haze
- Blue SWAT (1994): Toru Harada
- Kamen Rider × Kamen Rider Gaim & Wizard: The Fateful Sengoku Movie Battle (2013): Bujin Gaim (voice)
- Kamen Rider Drive: Surprise Future (2015): Spider-Type Roidmude 108 (Past)/Paradox Roidmude (voice)
- Kamen Rider Zi-O (2018): Ziku-Driver Related Item Voice (Voiced by Yōhei Ōnishi), OP Narrator, Ohma Zi-O (eps. 1, 15, 16, 30, 40 – ) (voice)
- Tensou Sentai Goseiger (2010): Alien Zutinma Dereputa of the Meteor (eps. 1–12 & 16) (voice)
- Tokkei Winspector (1990): Matsuyama
- Tokkyuu Shirei Solbrain (1991): Sekine (ep. 50)
- Tokusou Exceedraft (1992): Dr. Obayashi's assistant
- Tokusou Robo Janperson (1993): Takase
- Tokusou Sentai Dekaranger: 10 YEARS AFTER (2015): Kight Reidich (voice)

=== Other live-action ===
- X-Cross (2007, film): Akira Mononobe (voice)
- Wonderful World (2010, film): Atsushi Ito
- Kami Voice (2011, film)
- No Dropping Out: Back to School at 35 (2013, TV): narrator
- Reach Beyond the Blue Sky (2021, TV): Sakai Tadashige

=== Dubbing roles ===
==== Live-action ====
- George Clooney
  - ER: Doug Ross
  - Friends: Dr. Michael Mitchell
  - One Fine Day (2001 TV Asahi edition): Jack Taylor
  - Batman & Robin (2000 TV Asahi edition): Bruce Wayne/Batman
  - The Peacemaker: Thomas Devoe
  - Out of Sight: Jack Foley
  - Three Kings: Major Archie Gates
  - The Perfect Storm: Frank William "Billy" Tyne
  - O Brother, Where Art Thou?: Ulysses Everett McGill
  - Fail Safe: Col. Jack Grady
  - Ocean's Eleven: Daniel "Danny" Ocean
  - Spy Kids (DVD/VHS edition): Devlin
  - Confessions of a Dangerous Mind: Jim Byrd
  - Welcome to Collinwood: Jerzy
  - Intolerable Cruelty: Miles Massey
  - Spy Kids 3-D: Game Over: Devlin
  - Ocean's Twelve: Daniel "Danny" Ocean
  - Good Night, and Good Luck: Fred W. Friendly
  - Syriana: Bob Barnes
  - Michael Clayton: Michael Raymond Clayton
  - Ocean's Thirteen: Daniel "Danny" Ocean
  - Burn After Reading: Harry Pfarrer
  - Leatherheads: Jimmy "Dodge" Connelly
  - The Men Who Stare at Goats: Lyn Cassady
  - Up in the Air: Ryan Bingham
  - The American: Jack
  - The Ides of March: Mike Morris
  - Gravity: Matt Kowalski
  - Money Monster: Lee Gates
  - Hail, Caesar!: Baird Whitlock
  - Ticket to Paradise: David Cotton
  - The Flash: Bruce Wayne
  - IF: Spaceman
  - Wolfs: Margaret's Man
- Kiefer Sutherland
  - Chicago Joe and the Showgirl (2009 DVD edition): Karl Hulten
  - Last Light (2009 DVD edition): Denver Bayliss
  - Freeway (2008 DVD edition): Bob Wolverton
  - Ground Control (2008 DVD edition): Jack Harris
  - 24: Jack Bauer
  - Dead Heat: Pally LaMarr
  - Desert Saints: Arthur Banks
  - Paradise Found: Paul Gauguin
  - Taking Lives (2008 TV Asahi edition): Christopher Hart
  - River Queen: Doyle
  - The Sentinel: David Breckinridge
  - Mirrors: Ben Carson
  - The Confession: The Confessor
  - The Reluctant Fundamentalist: Jim Cross
  - Touch: Martin Bohm
  - Pompeii: Senator Corvus
  - Forsaken: John Henry Clayton
  - Zoolander 2: Kiefer Sutherland
  - Designated Survivor: Tom Kirkman
  - They Cloned Tyrone: Nixon
- Denzel Washington
  - Crimson Tide (2000 TV Asahi edition): Commander Ron Hunter
  - Courage Under Fire (2004 TV Asahi edition): Lieutenant Colonel Nathaniel Serling
  - Fallen (2002 Fuji TV edition): Detective John Hobbes
  - The Siege: Anthony Hubbard
  - The Bone Collector (2002 TV Asahi edition): Lincoln Rhyme
  - John Q. (2007 NTV edition): John Quincy Archibald
  - Antwone Fisher: LCDR Dr. Jerome Davenport
  - Man on Fire (2016 Netflix edition): John W. Creasy
  - The Manchurian Candidate: Major Bennett Marco
  - Safe House: Tobin Frost
  - Flight: William "Whip" Whitaker Sr.
- Dwayne Johnson
  - The Scorpion King: Mathayus
  - The Rundown: Beck
  - Gridiron Gang: Sean Porter
  - Southland Tales: Boxer Santaros/Jericho Cane
  - Fast Five: Luke Hobbs
  - Fast & Furious 6: Luke Hobbs
  - Furious 7: Luke Hobbs
  - The Fate of the Furious: Luke Hobbs
  - Baywatch: Mitch Buchannon
  - Hobbs & Shaw: Luke Hobbs
  - Jungle Cruise: Captain Frank "Skipper" Wolff
- Louis Koo
  - Bullets Over Summer: Brian
  - For Bad Boys Only: Jack Shum
  - The Legend of Zu: Red
  - Rob-B-Hood: Octopus
  - SPL II: A Time for Consequences: Hung Mun-Gong
  - Three: Chief Inspector Ken
  - League of Gods: General Leopard
  - Call of Heroes: Cho Siu-lun
  - Line Walker 2: Invisible Spy: Security Wing Superintendent Cheng
  - The White Storm 2: Drug Lords: Fung Chun-kwok
- Keanu Reeves
  - The Matrix series: Thomas Anderson/Neo
    - The Matrix (VHS/DVD/Blu-ray edition)
    - The Matrix Reloaded (VHS/DVD/Blu-ray and Theatrical edition)
    - The Matrix Revolutions (VHS/DVD/Blu-ray and Theatrical edition)
    - The Matrix Resurrections
  - The Watcher (2005 TV Tokyo edition): David Allen Griffin
  - Hardball: Conor O'Neill
  - Constantine (DVD and Blu-ray edition): John Constantine
  - A Scanner Darkly: Bob Arctor
  - Man of Tai Chi: Donaka Mark
- Cuba Gooding Jr.
  - A Murder of Crows: Lawson Russell
  - Instinct: Dr. Theo Caulder
  - Chill Factor: Arlo
  - Men of Honor: Carl Brashear
  - Pearl Harbor: Doris Miller
  - Snow Dogs: Dr. Theodore "Ted" Brooks
  - Hardwired: Luke Gibson
- Ma Dong-seok
  - Train to Busan: Sang-hwa
  - Along with the Gods: The Last 49 Days: Seongju
  - The Gangster, the Cop, the Devil: Jang Dong-soo
  - Ashfall: Professor Kang Bong-rae
  - The Roundup: Ma Seok-do
  - The Roundup: No Way Out: Ma Seok-do
  - The Roundup: Punishment: Ma Seok-do
- Gerard Butler
  - Shooters: Jackie Junior
  - Timeline: André Marek
  - Dear Frankie: The Stranger
  - The Game of Their Lives: Frank Borghi
  - Gamer: John "Kable" Tillman
  - Gods of Egypt: Set
- Guy Pearce
  - Ravenous: Capt. John Boyd
  - Memento: Leonard
  - Two Brothers: Aidan McCrory
  - Fragments: Dr. Bruce Laraby
  - Jack Irish series: Jack Irish
  - Breathe In: Keith Reynolds
- Aaron Kwok
  - The Storm Riders: Striding Cloud/Bou Ging Wan
  - China Strike Force: Darren Tong
  - Cold War: Sean K.F. Lau
  - The Monkey King: Bull Demon King
  - The Monkey King 2: Sun Wukong/Monkey King
  - The Monkey King 3: Sun Wukong
- Antonio Banderas
  - Interview with the Vampire (2000 TV Tokyo edition): Armand
  - Spy Kids (Netflix/Hulu edition): Gregorio Cortez
  - Femme Fatale: Nicolas Bardo
  - Ballistic: Ecks vs. Sever (2009 TV Asahi edition): Agent Jeremiah Ecks
  - My Mom's New Boyfriend: Tommy Lucero/Tomas Martinez
- Stephen Dorff
  - FeardotCom: Detective Mike Reilly
  - Felon: Wade Porter
  - Brake: Jeremy Reins
  - Zaytoun: Yoni
  - Embattled: Cash "The Slayer" Boykins
- Christian Bale
  - Captain Corelli's Mandolin: Mandras
  - Reign of Fire: Quinn
  - Equilibrium: John Preston
  - The Machinist: Trevor Reznik
- Dougray Scott
  - Arabian Nights: Sultan Shahryar/Amin
  - Ripley's Game: Jonathan Trevanny
  - Dark Water: Kyle Williams
  - Death Race 3: Inferno: Niles York
- Jason Clarke
  - Everest: Rob Hall
  - Terminator Genisys: John Connor/T-3000
  - The Man with the Iron Heart: Reinhard Heydrich
  - Pet Sematary: Dr. Louis Creed
- Nicolas Cage
  - The Rock (1999 NTV edition): Stanley Goodspeed
  - City of Angels: Seth
  - Windtalkers (2005 TV Asahi edition): Sergeant Joe Enders
  - Left Behind: Rayford Steele
- Prabhas
  - Baahubali: The Beginning: Shivudu alias Mahendra Baahubali and Amarendra Baahubali
  - Baahubali 2: The Conclusion: Shivudu alias Mahendra Baahubali and Amarendra Baahubali
  - Saaho: Ashok Chakravarthy / Siddhant Nandan Saaho
- 101 Dalmatians (2001 TV Asahi edition): Roger Dearly (Jeff Daniels)
- Abandon: Wade Handler (Benjamin Bratt)
- Air America: Rio Arnet (Lorenzo Lamas)
- Ali: Muhammad Ali (Will Smith)
- Aliens (2004 TV Asahi edition): Corporal Dwayne Hicks (Michael Biehn)
- Aliens vs. Predator: Requiem: Sheriff Eddie Morales (John Ortiz)
- All About the Benjamins: Tyson Bucum (Ice Cube)
- Ally McBeal: Doctor Greg Butters (Jesse L. Martin)
- Angels & Demons: Inspector General Ernesto Olivetti (Pierfrancesco Favino)
- Atomic Train: John Seger (Rob Lowe)
- Attack Force: Dwayne (David Kennedy)
- Austenland: Mr. Henry Nobley (JJ Feild)
- Ballerina: Daniel Pine (Norman Reedus)
- Battlefield Earth: Ker (Forest Whitaker)
- Belly of the Beast: Sunti (Byron Mann)
- Belly of the Beast (2007 TV Tokyo edition): Leon Washington (Patrick Robinson)
- Black Book: Hans Akkermans (Thom Hoffman)
- Black Water: Adam (Andy Rodoreda)
- Brotherhood of the Wolf: Mani (Mark Dacascos)
- Burn Notice: Simon Escher (Garret Dillahunt)
- Cat People (2003 DVD edition): Paul Gallier (Malcolm McDowell)
- Charlie Jade: Charlie Jade (Jeffrey Pierce)
- Che: Ernesto "Che" Guevara (Benicio del Toro)
- Chicago: Fred Casely (Dominic West)
- Children of Men: Luke (Chiwetel Ejiofor)
- Clash of the Titans: King Acrisius/Calibos (Jason Flemyng)
- Cold Case: Joseph Shaw (Kenny Johnson)
- Connie and Carla: Jeff (David Duchovny)
- Contact: Willie (Max Martini)
- Crash: Cameron Thayer (Terrence Howard)
- Crime and Punishment in Suburbia: Chris (Jeffrey Wright)
- Curse of the Golden Flower: Emperor Ping (Chow Yun-fat)
- Daredevil: Matt Murdock/Daredevil (Ben Affleck)
- The Deep End of the Ocean: Pat Cappadora (Treat Williams)
- Desperate Housewives: Bill Pearce (Mark Deklin)
- The Dilemma: Ronny Valentine (Vince Vaughn)
- Don't Breathe 2: Raylan (Brendan Sexton III)
- Due South: Benton Fraser (Paul Gross)
- El tiempo entre costuras: Ramiro Arribas Querol (Rubén Cortada)
- Enemy of the State (2003 Fuji TV edition): Loren Hicks (Loren Dean)
- The Exorcist: Father Marcus Keane (Ben Daniels)
- Exodus: Gods and Kings: Ramesses II (Joel Edgerton)
- Feast: Hero (Eric Dane)
- The Final Cut: Fletcher (Jim Caviezel)
- Flight of the Living Dead: Outbreak on a Plane: Paul Judd (Richard Tyson)
- The Forbidden Kingdom: The Jade Warlord (Collin Chou)
- Frankenfish: Sam Rivers (Tory Kittles)
- Full Frontal: Calvin/Nicholas (Blair Underwood)
- Ghost in the Shell: Hideo Kuze (Michael Pitt)
- Gone with the Wind (2000 TV Tokyo edition): Frank Kennedy (Carroll Nye)
- The Great Escape (2000 TV Tokyo edition): Louis Sedgwick (James Coburn)
- Halo: Master Chief (Pablo Schreiber)
- The Hard Corps: Wayne Barclay (Razaaq Adoti)
- Hitler: The Rise of Evil: Ernst Hanfstaengl (Liev Schreiber)
- Hope Floats: Bill Pruitt (Michael Paré)
- Hostage: Marshall "Mars" Krupcheck (Ben Foster)
- The Hunted: Aaron Hallam (Benicio del Toro)
- In America: Johnny Sullivan (Paddy Considine)
- In Enemy Hands: Captain Jonas Herdt (Til Schweiger)
- In Hell: Kyle LeBlanc (Jean-Claude Van Damme)
- Inception (2012 TV Asahi edition): Robert Fischer (Cillian Murphy)
- Invincible: Vince Papale (Mark Wahlberg)
- Ip Man 4: The Finale: Barton Geddes (Scott Adkins)
- K-19: The Widowmaker: Captain Mikhail Polenin (Liam Neeson)
- Kamen Rider: Dragon Knight: Frank Taylor (Jeff Davis)
- Kate & Leopold: Stuart Besser (Liev Schreiber)
- Killing Me Softly: Adam (Joseph Fiennes)
- La Vie en Rose: Marcel Cerdan (Jean-Pierre Martins)
- Land of the Dead: Foxy (Tony Nappo)
- Lara Croft: Tomb Raider – The Cradle of Life: Sean (Til Schweiger)
- The Legend of Bagger Vance: Bagger Vance (Will Smith)
- Legionnaire: Luther (Adewale Akinnuoye-Agbaje)
- Lethal Weapon 4: Martin Riggs (Mel Gibson)
- Little City: Kevin (Jon Bon Jovi)
- The Lord of the Rings trilogy: Boromir (Sean Bean)
- The Magnificent Seven (2013 Star Channel edition): Britt (James Coburn)
- A Man Apart: Jack "Hollywood" Slayton (Timothy Olyphant)
- Mars Attacks!: Billy-Glenn Norris (Jack Black)
- The Master: Freddie Quell (Joaquin Phoenix)
- Memories of Murder: Detective Seo Tae-yoon (Kim Sang-kyung)
- Mentors: King Arthur (Daniel Gillies)
- Miami Vice: Ricardo Tubbs (Jamie Foxx)
- Midnight in Paris: Ernest Hemingway (Corey Stoll)
- Monk: Gavin Lloyd (Ben Bass)
- Mother's Day: Bradley Barton (Jason Sudeikis)
- Mr. & Mrs. Smith: Eddie (Vince Vaughn)
- The Mummy Returns: Lock-Nah (Adewale Akinnuoye-Agbaje)
- The Musketeers: Emile Bonnaire (James Callis)
- My Best Friend's Wedding: Michael O'Neal (Dermot Mulroney)
- Nash Bridges: Ricky Allen Klinsmann (Kirk Fox)
- The Net: Jack Devlin (Jeremy Northam)
- New Police Story: Chief Inspector Chiu Chan (Yu Rongguang)
- The Next Best Thing: Ben Cooper (Benjamin Bratt)
- Night at the Museum: Secret of the Tomb: Laaa (Ben Stiller)
- No Escape: Hawkins (Ernie Hudson)
- On the Occasion of Remembering the Turning Gate: Gyung-soo (Kim Sang-kyung)
- Payback: Porter (Mel Gibson)
- A Perfect Murder: David Shaw (Viggo Mortensen)
- Picture Claire: Detective Lee (Raoul Bhaneja)
- Piranha 3D: Novak (Adam Scott)
- Planet of the Apes (2005 NTV edition): Thade (Tim Roth)
- Police Story (2012 Ultimate Blu-Ray edition): Danny Chu Ko (Fung Hark-On)
- Pride and Prejudice: Mr. Darcy (Colin Firth)
- Psycho (2010 Blu-Ray edition): Sam Loomis (John Gavin)
- The Punisher: Frank Castle/Punisher (Thomas Jane)
- The Purifiers: John (Gordon Alexander)
- Pushing Tin: Russell Bell (Billy Bob Thornton)
- Quo Vadis: Marcus Vinicius (Paweł Deląg)
- Ransom: Tom Mullen (Mel Gibson)
- Rebecca (DVD edition): Maxim de Winter (Laurence Olivier)
- Resident Evil: Apocalypse: Nicholai Ginovaeff (Zack Ward)
- Ride On: He Xin (Yu Rongguang)
- Robin Hood: Robin Hood (Jonas Armstrong)
- Roger Corman's Operation Rogue: Capt. Max Randall (Mark Dacascos)
- Rollerball: Marcus Ridley (LL Cool J)
- Runaway Jury: Lawrence Greene (Jeremy Piven)
- Sahara: Dirk Pitt (Matthew McConaughey)
- The Sentinel: Det. Jim Ellison (Richard Burgi)
- Secret Agent Man: Davis (Dondre Whitfield)
- Sherlock Holmes: Lord Coward (Hans Matheson)
- Sidewalks of New York: Tommy Reilly (Edward Burns)
- Snakes on a Plane: Three G's (Flex Alexander)
- Someone Like You: Eddie Alden (Hugh Jackman)
- Spartacus series: Spartacus (Andy Whitfield/Liam McIntyre)
- Star Wars: Episode II – Attack of the Clones: Captain Gregar Typho (Jay Laga'aia)
- Star Wars: Episode III – Revenge of the Sith: Captain Gregar Typho (Jay Laga'aia)
- Starship Troopers: Traitor of Mars: Colonel Johnny Rico (Casper Van Dien)
- Stealth: Lieutenant Ben Gannon (Josh Lucas)
- The Sum of All Fears: John Clark (Liev Schreiber)
- Sweet Home Alabama: Jake Perry (Josh Lucas)
- Swordfish: Stanley Jobson (Hugh Jackman)
- Taxi: Det. Andrew "Andy" Washburn (Jimmy Fallon)
- The Terminator (2003 TV Tokyo edition): Kyle Reese (Michael Biehn)
- The Thieves: Andrew (Oh Dal-su)
- The Towering Inferno (2013 BS Japan edition): Michael O'Hallorhan (Steve McQueen)
- Trapped: Dr. Will Jennings (Stuart Townsend)
- Triple 9: Russell Welch (Norman Reedus)
- Typhoon: Sin (Jang Dong-gun)
- Under the Tuscan Sun: Marcello (Raoul Bova)
- Underworld series: Kraven (Shane Brolly)
- Unstoppable: Dean Cage (Wesley Snipes)
- Vampires: Jan Valek (Thomas Ian Griffith)
- Van Helsing: Velkan Valerious (Will Kemp)
- Walk the Line: Johnny Cash (Joaquin Phoenix)
- The Walking Dead: Daryl Dixon (Norman Reedus)
- The Walking Dead: Daryl Dixon: Daryl Dixon (Norman Reedus)
- The Warlords: General Pang Qingyun (Jet Li)
- The Watcher: Joel Campbell (James Spader)
- Wedding Crashers: Jeremy Grey (Vince Vaughn)
- The Wedding Planner: Steve Edison (Matthew McConaughey)
- The West Wing: Lt. Cmdr. Jack Reese (Christian Slater)
- Wheels on Meals: Thug #1 (Benny Urquidez)
- Wild Things: Sam Lombardo (Matt Dillon)
- Without a Trace: Danny Taylor (Enrique Murciano)
- Wrong Turn: Chris Flynn (Desmond Harrington)
- Your Highness: Prince Thadeous (Danny McBride)
- Zombieland: Double Tap: Tallahassee (Woody Harrelson)

==== Animation ====
- Atlantis: Milo's Return: Vincenzo Santorini
- Baahubali: The Lost Legends: Amarendra Baahubali
- Chuggington: Action Chugger
- Epic: Ronin
- Final Fantasy: The Spirits Within: Gray Edwards
- Finding Nemo: Crush
- Finding Dory: Crush
- The Nut Job: Raccoon
- Resident Evil: Degeneration: Curtis Miller
- South Park: Bigger, Longer & Uncut: Dr. Gouache, Conan O'Brien, The Baldwin Brothers
- Star Wars: Clone Wars: Captain Gregar Typho
- Star Wars: The Clone Wars: Captain Gregar Typho
- Star Wars: Droids (2005 DVD edition): Mungo Baobab
- Team America: World Police: Chris
