= Another Code: R – A Journey into Lost Memories =

2009 video game by Cing

Another Code: R A Journey into Lost Memories
- Developer: Cing
- Publisher: Nintendo
- Director: Shigeru Komine
- Producer: Takuya Miyagawa
- Designer: Rika Suzuki
- Programmers: Junpei Fukuura; Natsuko Wada; Hiroaki Ōkuma
- Artists: Taisuke Kanasaki; Keisuke Sakamoto
- Writers: Rika Suzuki; Yu Tominaga; Shunichi Nakagaki; Tsubasa Shibata
- Composer: Satoshi Okubo
- Platform: Wii
- Release: JP: 5 February 2009; EU: 26 June 2009
- Genre: Point-and-click adventure
- Mode: Single-player

Another Code: R – A Journey into Lost Memories (Note: Japanese: アナザーコード：Ｒ 記憶の扉, Hepburn: Anazā Kōdo: Āru – Kioku no Tobira; lit. "Another Code: R – Memory's Door") is a 2009 point-and-click adventure game developed by Cing and published by Nintendo for the Wii console. First released in Japan on 5 February 2009, and in Europe on 26 June of the same year, it is a sequel to 2005 Nintendo DS title Another Code: Two Memories. (Note: Known as Trace Memory in North America.) Set two years after the first game, returning protagonist Ashley Mizuki Robins joins her father at the fictional Lake Juliet, solving the mystery of her mother at this location.

Remakes of both Another Code games were released for the Nintendo Switch as part of Another Code: Recollection on 19 January 2024.

== Gameplay ==
Players control Ashley Mizuki Robbins via the Wii Remote, to explore, and solve puzzles, across Lake Juliet. Exploration gameplay is split into two distinct sections: exterior, and interior exploration. During map exploration of exterior locations, the player moves Ashley along set routes within 3D environments. During exploration of most interior areas, Ashley is fixed to a set spot, and the player can rotate her perspective of the room, as well as move from room to room by selecting a doorway when it is within their view. During both exterior and interior exploration, the player can highlight select portions of the environment within the environment to examine them closer, and have a look at specific things of interest. By interacting with the environment, the player can enter certain items into their inventory. The player can also take photos of the environment, which can be used to solve various puzzles.

Interactions with non-player characters take the form of visual novel style segments, in which the player progresses through Ashley's conversation with the characters, and is occasionally prompted to pick a specific response. The player may also be required to present an item to someone.

The player must solve various puzzles throughout the game by utilising the Wii Remote's motion sensing capabilities. An in-game device which can unlock card-reader locks, the "TAS", is made to resemble a Wii Remote, and is used through the game by the player to access locked areas by completing unlocking sequences which utilise the remote's motion sensing and unique button layout. An updated model of the DAS from Two Memories (now modelled after the Nintendo DSi) acts as the player's menu, from which they can access various features, including in-game options such as viewing the photos on the DAS, as well as game options.

Despite the claims of the game's promotion and back-cover, the nunchuk is required in order to play the game, as it is needed to complete a late-game puzzle.

== Plot ==
The story takes place two years after the events of the first game on the fictional Lake Juliet. At the end of the summer holiday, Ashley Mizuki Robins, now 16-years old and an aspiring musician, receives an invitation with a package of newly modelled "DAS" (Dual Another System), containing a message from her father that he wants to bond with the two on a camping trip at Lake Juliet. Ashley arrives, but frustrated as her bag gets stolen. After a brief argument with her father, Richard, he reveals that he came to the lake to know why her mother, Sayoko was doing here 13 years ago, which much to her surprise, Ashley's been having brief flashbacks as soon as she arrived. He gives Ashley a "TAS" (True Another System), a mysterious remote-like device which Sayoko had built before death.

Richard leaves after getting an emergency call from the lab, then Ashley meets with a man named Ryan Gray, a scientist who's employed at J.C. Valley that knew of her parents, especially Sayoko. After camping with him, she meets a 13-year-old boy named Matthew Crusoe, who is a runaway that came to search for his missing father, Michael in Lake Juliet. The two explore around the lake, as they recover missing items that were in Ashley's bag, and learns what happened to Michael: he was framed by the real culprits behind the pollution of the lake, and has been being followed ever since.

Ashley is called by her father to J.C. Valley, which much to her surprise, he never sent the message. After slowly unravelling the mystery inside J.C. Valley, Ashley learns that one of the employees named Sofia Callaghan is in league with Ryan to search for Sayoko's pendant, and is also helping him reactivate the prototype "Another". After Sofia escapes, Ashley learns the truth of her mother from Rex Alfred: The lab's late-director Judd Fitzgerald had summoned Sayoko and gave her an ultimatum, which she chose her family over being a scientist. As a result, Sayoko's memory of her days as a scientist were erased, but Rex had secretly placed the liquid memories in a pendant and gave it to her.

After Richard's memories were erased by Ryan via prototype "Another", Ryan blackmails Ashley by letting her mother's memories overwrite hers from the device and her mother's pendant, but fails during its process. Ryan tries to kill Ashley, but Rex saves her and is wounded in the process. After Ashley uses the "TAS" to restore her father's memories, both later discover from Rex that Ryan is Judd's son and to get rid of his grief from his mother's tragic passing, Judd had erased his son's memory via formula and was given away for adoption. Both chase Ryan down to the nearby island and confront him, where he reveals that he is the reason behind Sayoko's death: Judd had chosen Sayoko as his successor, and Bill Edward had revealed to Ryan afterwards of his true heritage. Enraged, he was determined to kill off any successors to Judd, and convinced Bill to kill Sayoko. After failing to kill Ashley, Richard, and himself, Ryan decides to turn himself in.

The next morning, with everything resolved, Ashley returns home. The game ends with Ashley in a band contest.

== Development ==
The game was first shown at Nintendo's autumn conference in October 2008.

== Reception ==
Reception

Aggregate score
Aggregator	Score
Metacritic	66/100

Review scores
Publication	Score
Adventure Gamers	3/5
Edge	4/10
Eurogamer	6/10
Famitsu	28/40
GamesMaster	70%
GameSpot	6.5/10
IGN	8/10
NGamer	70%
Nintendo Life	7/10
Official Nintendo Magazine	84%
The Daily Telegraph	8/10

The game received a score of all four sevens for a total of 28 out of 40 from Japanese gaming magazine Famitsu. Elsewhere, it received a bit more mixed reviews than the original Another Code according to the review aggregation website Metacritic. It was the 11th best-selling game in Japan during the week of its release, selling fewer than 15,000 copies.

Chris Schilling of The Daily Telegraph gave the game 8/10. He gave praise to the puzzles and the touching story with its mature themes, stating that they help keep interest even when the game's story meanders. He also praised the game's watercolour visuals, saying that they make the world a pleasure to be in.

Despite mixed reception and lacklustre sales, Another Code: R has gained a reception as an underrated game over the years. Chris Schilling of The Telegraph, who gave praise to the game in his review, rated Another Code: R as one of the top ten underrated games of 2009, in December of the same year. The game has particularly garnered some positive reception following the end of the Wii's lifespan. Kate Willaert of A Critical Hit put the game seventh in a shared seventh place in "Top 20 Games Nintendo Wouldn't Release In The US", alongside Last Window: The Secret of Cape West, another title by Cing. She said that it had a "beautifully designed and animated world" and also praised the game's cover art as "one of the nicest looking of 2009". GameCentral on Metro UK called the game a "hidden gem of the Wii", praising the graphics, animations, soundtrack, puzzles, and in particular, the story and Ashley's "realistically written" character. Game journalist Chris Scullion put Another Code: R in his list of the 30 best Wii games, calling it "cracking" and considering Ashley to be a "rare" example of a "well-rounded female lead". A decade after the game's release, in 2019, Charles Herold of Lifewire called Another Code: R one of the "top 5 missing Wii games", referring to its lack of an American release.

Positive analysis has also been directed at its angle of storytelling. Anthony John Agnello of The A.V. Club has praised how the game's storytelling "thrived on boredom". He stated that Another Code: R's story sandwiches exciting, large moments between hours of tedious conversations, in a way that allows the game to thrive on this, by making players experience the "beauty of real boredom [...] the color of a natural life", in a way that is "unexpectedly intoxicating". He compared the experience of Another Code: R "to waking up in the morning and realizing how miraculous it is that you are alive".

Ashley in her Another Code: R variation has appeared in the Super Smash Bros. Ultimate iteration of the Nintendo crossover fighting series Super Smash Bros.
