= Bianca Allen =

American voice actress

- Born: United States
- Other names: B. Allen; Bianka Aren
- Occupation: Voice actress

Bianca Allen is an American voice actress who primarily does narration voice-over work as well as characters in numerous video games. She is mostly known for her roles as Carrie Fernandez from Castlevania 64, Alicia S. Tiller and Misato Hayakawa from Countdown Vampires, and Reiko Hinomoto and Rowdy Reiko from Rumble Roses. Recently she has provided narration and subway platform announcements in Japanese.

== Filmography ==
=== Television ===
| Year | Title | Role | Notes | Ref. |
|---|---|---|---|---|
| 1996 | Kenpо̄ Wa Mada Ka | Beate Sirote Gordon | Television film; as Bianka Aren | |
| 2010 | Edonism | TV Announcer | | |
| 2012 | Little Charo: Tohoku-hen | Mina | English dub | |
| 2021 | Yasuke | Additional Voices | English dub | |

=== Video games ===
| Year | Title | Role | Notes | Ref. |
|---|---|---|---|---|
| 1999 | Castlevania | Carrie Fernández | | |
| 1999 | Countdown Vampires | Alice S. Tiller; additional voices | | |
| 1999 | Gallop Racer | Additional voices | as B. Allen | |
| 2000 | Shenmue | Honey Jackson; additional voices | English dub | |
| 2000 | Slashout | Luna | | |
| 2001 | Bloody Roar 3 | Uriko Nomura | | |
| 2001 | Mr. Driller 2 | Additional voices | | |
| 2001 | Universal Studios Theme Parks Adventure | Winnie Woodpecker | | |
| 2002 | Gitaroo Man | Kira, Pico | English dub | |
| 2002 | Poinie's Poin | Lilin, Lolo, Poinie's Mam | English dub | |
| 2002 | Rygar: The Legendary Adventure | Princess Harmonia | English dub | |
| 2002 | Tekken 4 | | PlayStation 2 version | |
| 2003 | Boktai: The Sun is in Your Hand | Lita, Carmilla | English dub | |
| 2003 | Glass Rose | Takako Yoshinodou, Kanae Yoshinodou | English dub | |
| 2003 | Ka 2: Let's Go to Hawaii | Additional voices | | |
| 2003 | Outrun 2 | Narrator, Clarissa | Uncredited | |
| 2003 | Spy Fiction | Sheila Crawford | | |
| 2003 | Way of the Samurai 2 | Kasumi | English dub | |
| 2004 | Baten Kaitos: Eternal Wings and the Lost Ocean | Xelha | English dub | |
| 2004 | Boktai 2: Solar Boy Django | Lita, Violet, Durathror | English dub | |
| 2004 | Michigan: Report From Hell | Pamela Martel, Deborah Flair | English dub | |
| 2004 | Rumble Roses | Reiko Hinomoto / Rowdy Reiko | English dub | |
| 2005 | Musashi: Samurai Legend | Mirabo, Maribo | English dub | |
| 2006 | Elite Beat Agents | Additional voices | | |
| 2006 | Mobile Suit Gundam: Crossfire | Additional voices | English dub | |
| 2007 | Lunar Knights | Virginia Poe, Carmilla, Lisbeth | English dub | |
| 2007 | Virtua Fighter 5 | Vanessa Lewis | | |
| 2008 | Cooking Mama: World Kitchen | Kate, David | English dub | |
| 2010 | Ace Combat: Joint Assault | Sara Andersson | English dub | |
| 2010 | Mario Sports Mix | White Mage | English Dub | |
| 2011 | Frog Minutes | Narrator | English dub | |
| 2016 | The King of Fighters XIV | Female Announcer | | |
| 2020 | Last Cloudia | Lily | English dub | |
