= Chase: Cold Case Investigations - Distant Memories =

2016 video game

- Developer(s): Arc System Works
- Publisher(s): JP: Arc System Works; WW: Aksys Games
- Director(s): Tetsuro Shoji
- Producer(s): Tadashi Nishi
- Designer(s): Taisuke Kanasaki
- Programmer(s): Toshiya Kazu; Araki Yusuke
- Writer(s): Mayu Sakura
- Composer(s): Satoshi Okubo
- Platform(s): Nintendo 3DS
- Release: JP: May 11, 2016; NA/EU: October 13, 2016
- Genre(s): Visual novel, adventure
- Mode(s): Single-player

Chase: Cold Case Investigations - Distant Memories (Note: Japanese: CHASE 未解決事件捜査課 ～遠い記憶～, Hepburn: Chēsu: Mikaiketsu Jiken Sōsaka — Tōi Kioku) is a 2016 visual novel adventure video game developed by Arc System Works for the Nintendo 3DS. It was released in Japan on May 11, 2016, and in North America and Europe on October 13, 2016, courtesy of Aksys Games. The game revolves around detective partners who reopen a cold case, realizing it may have been the work of a murderer. It got mixed reviews from critics, who praised its artwork, music and story, but lamented its short length, lack of interactivity or difficulty, and abrupt ending, believing it felt like the intro for a larger, nonexistent game.

== Overview ==
Chase is based on two detectives of the Tokyo Metropolitan Police Department's cold case unit, Shounosuke Nanase and Koto Amekura, that are tipped off by an anonymous caller that an explosion five years prior, previously ruled an accident, was purposely set off to mask a murder, leading to a new investigation of the case.

== Development and release ==
Chase was developed by Arc System Works, by former staff members from the studio Cing, including game designer Taisuke Kanasaki. It is narratively and thematically similar to Hotel Dusk: Room 215 and Last Window: The Secret of Cape West, detective titles developed by Cing before its closure.

The game was released in Japan as a digital-only title for the Nintendo 3DS eShop on May 11, 2016. Aksys Games handled the localization and published the title for North America and Europe on October 13, 2016.

== Reception ==
Reception

Aggregate score
Aggregator	Score
Metacritic	59/100

Review scores
Publication	Score
Adventure Gamers	1.5/5
Destructoid	7/10
Nintendo Life	7/10
Nintendo World Report	6.5/10
USgamer	2/5

Chase: Cold Case Investigations - Distant Memories received "mixed" reviews according to the review aggregation website Metacritic.
