= Another Code: Recollection =

2024 video game by Arc System Works

- Icon
- Developer: Arc System Works
- Publisher: Nintendo
- Director: Tetsuro Shoji
- Producers: Shinya Saito; Satoshi Shimada; Toyokazu Nonaka
- Designers: Shinichi Nakagawa; Masayuki Hida
- Programmer: Kentarou Hata
- Artist: Taisuke Kanasaki
- Writers: Rika Suzuki; Aiko Takami; Mariko Yuuda; Hiromitsu Azuma
- Composers: Satoshi Okubo; Rei Kondoh; Haruno Ito
- Engine: Unity
- Platform: Nintendo Switch
- Release: January 19, 2024
- Genre: Puzzle adventure
- Mode: Single-player

Another Code: Recollection (Note: Japanese: アナザーコード リコレクション: ２つの記憶 / 記憶の扉, Hepburn: Anazā Kōdo Rikorekushon: Futatsu no Kioku/Kioku no Tobira; lit. "Another Code Recollection: Two Memories/Door of Memory") is a 2024 puzzle adventure game developed by Arc System Works and published by Nintendo for the Nintendo Switch. Released worldwide on January 19, 2024, it is a remake of two point-and-click adventure games originally developed by Cing: 2005 Nintendo DS title Another Code: Two Memories, (Note: Released in North America as Trace Memory.) and 2009 Wii title Another Code: R – A Journey into Lost Memories. Players control protagonist Ashley Mizuki Robins as she searches for her father in Blood Edward Island, and clues of her mother in Lake Juliet two years later. Along with updated visuals and gameplay, the remake's versions of these titles saw several narrative changes to streamline their respective stories, with the plot of the latter game also diverging heavily from the original.

== Gameplay ==
Another Code: Recollection is a 3D puzzle adventure game. Players control protagonist Ashley Mizuki Robins to explore and solve puzzles in Blood Edward Island (Two Memories) and Lake Juliet (Journey into Lost Memories) in a third-person view. In both stories, through Ashley, the players can operate a "DAS" (Dual Another System), a handheld device that resembles the Nintendo Switch, (Note: In the original games, it resembled the Nintendo DS (Two Memories) and Nintendo DSi (Journey into Lost Memories).) through which they can utilize a camera, view photos and character biographies, and scan QR coded origami crane messages. In addition, the "DAS" unlocks card reader locks around Lake Juliet via "RAS" (Reboot Another System), a wristband-like device Ashley receives at the beginning of the latter game. (Note: In the original game, the device resembled a Wii Remote, and was dubbed "TAS" (True Another System) in the European version.) Interactions with non-player characters still retains the visual novel style format from the original games, but with the addition of voice acting, fully 3D models and comic book-style panel and speech bubbles. The remake introduces an optional escalating hint system to assist the player if they ever get stuck or miss a puzzle.

== Plot ==
=== Two Memories ===
On February 24, 2005, a day before her birthday, a 13-year-old Ashley Mizuki Robins arrives on Blood Edward Island with her aunt Jessica, after she receives a letter from her father, Richard, who was believed to be dead, along with a handheld device called "DAS" (Dual Another System). After they arrive, Richard is not there to greet them, so Jessica goes to look for him, but when she does not return, Ashley ventures out to search for both of them. While exploring the island, Ashley encounters and befriends a 10-year-old ghost named D, who has lost his memories and wants to learn the truth behind his death. Together, they enter the Edward Mansion and search for clues on Jessica and Richard's whereabouts and D's memories.

In the mansion, Ashley and D learn the history of the Edward family, and his past: D's real identity is "Daniel Edward", a young boy from the Edward family and son of Thomas Edward, who both visited the island during his great-grandfather, Lawrence's illness, and befriended a girl named Frannie, the daughter of his uncle Henry. At the same time, Ashley meets her father, Richard, in the drawing room, where he asks her to retrieve three keys to "Another", which is a device with the ability to replace someone's real memories with false ones, which was created by Ashley's parents while they worked as memory researchers at MJ Labs. While retrieving the keys, Ashley eventually learns that her mother, Sayoko, was murdered on the night of her 3rd birthday. Ashley questions her father about her mother's death, but Richard angrily shouts at her for not giving him the keys, and soon after, a saddened Ashley rebukes him.

Ashley later finds Jessica trapped in the wine cellar, who reveals that Richard and Sayoko's old colleague, Bill Edward, had dragged her there. Ashley later realizes that the imposter she encountered earlier was Bill, soon after reuniting with the real Richard Robins in an "Another" lab. Realizing Bill had altered Richard's memory from "Another", Ashley uses the "DAS" to recover his true memory of the night of her mother's murder, which reveals that he was not the killer. Ashley and Richard confront Bill in a cave, where at gunpoint, she realizes that Bill is the true culprit of her mother's murder. Bill explains that because of his jealousy and his rage over Sayoko's "betrayal", he broke into their family home to steal back "Another", shooting Sayoko. As he tries to shoot both of them, D's sudden appearance shocks Bill and causes him to fall a nearby drop to his death.

Bill's death causes D to remember his death: after he had witnessed his uncle shooting and killing his father in a misunderstanding over the inheritance, D ran in fear from his uncle to the cave, where he fell to his death while seeing his uncle's outstretching hand. Shortly after, Ashley finds out on Bill's laptop that he had successfully transferred "Another"'s data to an unknown chat user named "j.c.valley_0013". Before Ashley, Richard, and Jessica depart the island, Ashley bids D farewell as he departs to the afterlife, content that he found his answers.

=== Journey into Lost Memories ===
Two years later, on August 24, 2007, now 16-year-old Ashley Mizuki Robins arrives to Lake Juliet after receiving a call from her father, Richard for a camping trip and sends her the "DAS". Ashley arrives, but becomes frustrated after her bag gets stolen by a 13-year-old boy named Matthew Crusoe near the bus stop. At the campsite, she and Richard briefly argue, as she states that she made plans with her bandmates for the upcoming band contest, but her father reveals that he wanted to show Ashley the lake again, as her mother, Sayoko had visited the lake 13 years prior. Much to Ashley's surprise, she admits she's been having flashbacks of her mother when she arrived. He later gives Ashley the "RAS" (Reboot Another System), a wristband-like device that was built by Sayoko before her death.

After the camping trip, Ashley frequently encounters a mysterious guy named Ryan Gray, a J.C. Valley employee who claims to have known her mother. Soon after, Ashley encounters Matthew again, and befriends him, after learning that he's a runaway in search for clues of his father, Michael, who had disappeared. While searching for clues, they learn that Michael was a lottery winner that attempted to turn the lake into a beautiful resort, but overnight was mysteriously framed by the residents and tourists for pollution on the lake. Soon after they re-activate the clock tower's bell, Matthew remembers his sister, Kelly's death, who died by falling off the clock tower five years ago, and suppressed it ever since. Soon after, Greg Davis, a journalist trying to prove Michael's innocence, appears and informs Matthew that his father had woken up from a coma.

After Matthew leaves with Greg to be reunited with his father, Ashley is called to J.C. Valley by Ryan, claiming her father had summoned her. She is then ambushed by Sofia Callaghan, one of the employees in J.C. Valley, who then locks her in one of the labs. While exploring the lab, Ashley discovers from J.C. Valley employees, Gina Barnes and Ian Tyler that Richard never sent for her, and Sofia is in league with an unknown accomplice, as she's stealing information about "Another". After Richard saves her from Sofia at gunpoint, Ashley is taken by Ryan to a hidden "Another" lab, where he uses it to implant Sayoko's memories through her. In her mind, a memory of Sayoko informs Ashley to save herself by destroying her memories through "RAS", as the device was made to counteract "Another"'s memory re-write function. Ryan is disappointed as Ashley wakes up in her own self, and disappears.

After learning of the situation, J.C. Valley's director, Rex Alfred, reveals the truth behind the several conspiracies: First, the lab's original director, Judd Fitzgerald had summoned Sayoko to the lab 13 years ago, where he gave her an ultimatum, which she chose her family over being a scientist, leading Judd to use "Another" to extract Sayoko's memories of her days as a scientist, but after seeing the sadness in her eyes, Rex had secretly placed the memory in a liquid pendant and gave it to her. Second, Ryan is the son of Judd, and he had died 15 years ago after being a failed test subject to an incomplete "Another", where Judd tried to erase his son's memories of his mother after her death. Third, Judd is responsible for resident's blame towards Michael Crusoe via a remote-controlled "Another" that he had placed throughout the security cameras to protect his research.

Ashley and Richard arrive to a nearby small island, where Ryan's grave is located. Ryan appears before Ashley, and reveals everything: After real Ryan's death, his memories were recorded through liquid memory, and developed a conscience life-form. Then, a storm from 6 years prior tore the J.C. Valley building, and contained memories were leaked through the water of the lake, thus not only the lake became his brain, but caused its pollution. After he gained access to J.C. Valley's computers, Ryan learned of Bill Edward's murder on Sayoko, and was somehow connected to Judd. This angered Ryan and his construct appeared before him, whom questioned Sayoko's death, but his appearance shocked Judd, leading to his death. He also reveals he's the one behind Bill and Sofia's motives on stealing "Another" data, as he wanted to use the device to be reunited with Sayoko, since she's the only one who knew of his existence. With the message from Sayoko through the "RAS", Ashley assures Ryan that he will not be forgotten, and he peacefully passes on.

The next morning, with everything resolved, Ashley bids everyone goodbye, and returns home with her aunt Jessica.

== Development and release ==
Another Code: Recollection is a remake of Another Code: Two Memories, released for the Nintendo DS handheld console in 2005, and its sequel, Another Code: R – A Journey into Lost Memories for the Wii console in 2009, for the Nintendo Switch. It was first announced during September 2023's Nintendo Direct. It also marked the first time the sequel was being released in North America, as the original game was only released in Japan and European countries. In addition to enhanced visuals, puzzles and music, Recollection features fully explorable areas and voice acting in cutscenes, which were not present in the original games. That same day, Taisuke Kanasaki, who served as a director, art director and character designer for both original games confirmed that he returned as an art director for the remakes. A demo of the game was released on Nintendo eShop on December 14, 2023, which allowed the progression from the first chapter.

== Reception ==
=== Critical reception ===
Reception

Aggregate scores
Aggregator	Score
Metacritic	73/100
OpenCritic	64% recommend

Review scores
Publication	Score
Destructoid	7/10
Digital Trends	3.5/5
Famitsu	32/40
GameSpot	7/10
Hardcore Gamer	2/5
IGN	7/10
Nintendo Life	7/10
Shacknews	7/10
Video Games Chronicle	4/5

Another Code: Recollection received "mixed or average reviews" on review aggregator website Metacritic. On OpenCritic, the game was recommended by 64% of critics. Chris Scullion of Video Games Chronicle rated the game positively, saying that "while it lasts, however, Another Code: Recollection is a beautiful adventure game with a touching storyline that only goes to remind us why Cing's closure all those years ago remains such a loss." GameCentral on Metro UK gave the game a mixed review, praising the visuals and artwork, but stating that they felt the script and the puzzles were weak.
