= Again (video game) =

2009 video game

- Developer: Cing
- Publisher: Tecmo
- Director: Shigeru Komine
- Producer: Takuya Miyakawa
- Designers: Angyo Hayasaka; Shiro Uagawa; Takashi Yano; Takashi Amano
- Programmers: Tetsuji Fujisawa; Yasuki Sekihara; Toshifumi Higashi; Toshiyuki Iwabuchi; Kenji Udoh
- Artist: Kenichi Shigeto
- Writers: Yuki Tsuruta; Hidetake Itoh
- Composers: Naoyuki Yoneda; Tatsuya Fujiwara
- Platform: Nintendo DS
- Release: JP: December 10, 2009; NA: March 30, 2010
- Genre: Adventure
- Mode: Single-player

Again: Interactive Crime Novel, known in Japan as Again: FBI Chōshinri Sōsakan (AGAIN FBI超心理捜査官; "Again: FBI Parapsychological Investigator"), is a mystery adventure video game developed by Cing and published by Tecmo for the Nintendo DS. It was released in Japan on December 10, 2009 and in North America on March 30, 2010.

== Gameplay ==
The game is presented in FMV cutscenes. While playing the game, the DS is held vertically, using two screens for the visions. Environments are explored in first person, with the player moving around using the control pad. The player can use J's psychic abilities to see into the past, which allows him to investigate crime scenes as they happened. The player can inspect items and interact with the environment using the touch screen, and can view visions of the past by manipulating the area to make it look like what it looked like when the crime was committed. After all of the visions in an area have been found, the player will be given a series of clips that are out of order. Putting the clips in order reveals a short video where the murder is shown. J has a "psychic health meter" which depletes if the players uses his abilities on areas irrelevant to the case. Completely draining the meter results in a game over, forcing the player to restart the investigation. J can also interview witnesses for additional information through a branching dialogue system.

== Premise ==
A string of serial murders from 19 years ago have started up again. The player takes the role of J, an agent of the FBI and sole survivor of the murders. J has a special ability called "past vision" to solve puzzles, which he uses as he investigates the murders committed by the serial killer known only as "Providence".

== Development and release ==
Throughout Again's development, Cing intended it to appeal to Western audiences from the very beginning by taking cues from US crime television shows like CSI: Crime Scene Investigation and Law & Order: Special Victims Unit and incorporating a realistic film noir visual style. The game was originally planned to be subtitled Eye of Providence.

Again was first released in Japan on December 10, 2009, and a North American localization was released on March 30, 2010, just nearly one month after the company folded. Again is thus Cing's penultimate game overall (ahead of Last Window: The Secret of Cape West) and also its last game to be published by a third party or localized for North America.

== Reception ==
Reception

Aggregate score
Aggregator	Score
Metacritic	52/100

Review scores
Publication	Score
Adventure Gamers	3.5/5
Destructoid	5/10
Eurogamer	4/10
Famitsu	30/40
Game Informer	6/10
GameSpot	5/10
GameTrailers	4.7/10
IGN	4.5/10
Nintendo Power	7/10
Nintendo World Report	5.5/10

The game received "mixed" reviews according to the review aggregation website Metacritic. Critics praised the concept, FMV artstyle, and controls, but criticized the "Psychic health meter", mechanics, sense of direction, dialogue system, and ending.

Writing for Eurogamer, John Walker gave a disappointed review, stating, "It's a game that asks the player to think more deeply, or at least demands that one be slightly pretentious when discussing it. But rather sadly, it's also rubbish.". Writing for Game Informer, Annette Gonzalez called the game a "Huge snoozefest" and criticized the area graphics, calling them "Muddy and pixelated". Writing for IGN, Arthur Gies was harsh on the game, calling it "Full of bad adventure game cliches" and "Mired in repetition". In a review for GameSpot, Nathan Meunier criticized the game's plot progression, calling it "Awkward and clunky", but praised the FMV artstyle, saying it "[Made] the [game] stand out in a good way". In Japan, Famitsu gave it a score of one eight, two sevens, and one eight, for a total of 30 out of 40. Randy Nelson from Nintendo Power praised the game mechanics that recreate past crimes for bringing "a fresh new twist" to the DS hardware but felt there wasn't enough of it. He concludes by calling Again "an open-and-shut case for budding crime-solvers with a taste for the unusual."
