= Hotel Dusk: Room 215 =

2007 video game

- Developer: Cing
- Publisher: Nintendo
- Director: Taisuke Kanasaki
- Producer: Takuya Miyagawa
- Designer: Rika Suzuki
- Artists: Taisuke Kanasaki; Keisuke Sakamoto
- Writer: Rika Suzuki
- Composer: Satoshi Okubo
- Platform: Nintendo DS
- Release: NA: January 22, 2007; JP: January 25, 2007; AU: February 22, 2007; EU: April 13, 2007; KOR: February 12, 2009
- Genre: Point-and-click adventure
- Mode: Single-player

Hotel Dusk: Room 215 (Note: Japanese: ウィッシュルーム 天使の記憶, Hepburn: Wisshu Rūmu Tenshi no Kioku; lit. "Wish Room: Angel's Memory") is a point-and-click adventure game developed by Cing and published by Nintendo for the Nintendo DS. The game debuted at E3 on May 9, 2006. It was initially released in North America on January 22, 2007, and later internationally. The game supports the Nintendo DS Rumble Pak accessory. It was re-released in 2008 under the Touch! Generations line of DS (Dual Screen) games. A sequel, Last Window: The Secret of Cape West, was released in 2010 for the DS.

== Gameplay ==
Screenshot of gameplay showing both DS screens in their vertical format

The player, controlling Kyle Hyde, interacts with the environment using the Nintendo DS's touch screen. Gameplay involves navigating the hotel, speaking with hotel staff and patrons, and solving puzzles using the handheld's various features including the touch screen, microphone, and clamshell cover. The game is played with the DS rotated 90 degrees like a book.

The player may ask questions about items that Kyle has collected, or topics which have been brought to his attention. By asking the right questions, the player will uncover the information Kyle needs, but incorrect choices, including asking the wrong question, making a wrong assumption, behaving rudely, getting caught with contraband, or being caught in a restricted area may confuse, frighten or anger the character Kyle is speaking to, as indicated by the character's image darkening. This may result in a game over, which usually involves the hotel manager expelling him from the premises, or a crucial character refusing to cooperate, preventing him from ever solving the mystery.

Many of the game's puzzles involve using the touch screen to perform a simple task. Movement is performed by leading an iconic representation of Kyle around a map of the hotel on the touch screen, or by using the d-pad, while a first-person three-dimensional view is shown on the other screen.

The game includes a journal to record notes in, with the player able to write and erase across three pages. All critical in-game story notes are copied automatically.

== Synopsis ==
The game takes place in a rural Nevada hotel, Hotel Dusk, and centers on Kyle Hyde, a former NYPD detective now working as a salesman in order to find his missing police partner, Brian Bradley. At the hotel, he checks in to Room 215, which is rumored to grant wishes. At the hotel, Hyde dives into a series of interconnected mysteries about art forgery, kidnappings, murder, his missing partner, and the criminal organization Nile.

== Development ==
Hotel Dusk was in production for about a year and a half. The development team comprised 20 staff members. In an interview with QJ.net, director Taisuke Kanasaki explained that the development team wanted Hotel Dusk to have "an unprecedented visual expression not found in any other game".

The game uses rotoscoping to animate its characters. Game environments are illustrated in a brushwork style, with backgrounds drawn half-finished and 3D objects strewn about. While not a first in gaming, rotoscoping was still rare in most games (with only a handful, including the original Prince of Persia, using the animation style). Many of the characters' designs were influenced by the appearance of their actors.

== Reception ==
Reception

Aggregate score
Aggregator	Score
Metacritic	78/100

Review scores
Publication	Score
1Up.com	B+
Adventure Gamers	3.5/5
Edge	6/10
Electronic Gaming Monthly	8.67/10
Eurogamer	7/10
Famitsu	9/10, 7/10, 9/10, 8/10
Game Informer	7/10
GamePro	3.75/5
GameRevolution	B−
GameSpot	8.2/10
GameSpy	4/5
GameTrailers	8.1/10
GameZone	8.9/10
IGN	7.9/10
Nintendo Power	8/10
The A.V. Club	D+
The Sydney Morning Herald	3/5

Hotel Dusk: Room 215 received "generally favorable reviews" according to review aggregation website Metacritic. In Japan, Famitsu gave it a score of 33 out of 40.

The game was selected as one of Gaming Target's "52 Games We'll Still Be Playing From 2007". It was the 76th best-selling game in Japan in 2007, with 213,208 copies sold. A retrospective at Kotaku described the experience as "a big puzzle; everyone has a secret, and the writing (and localization) is done so well." The reviewer added that they were "constantly surprised by the characters and their motivations". 411Mania gave it a score of seven out of ten, saying that the game is "easy to like and easier to want to get more of." 1Up.com gave the game a B+ and wrote: "As you'd expect from a Nintendo-published game, the dialogue truly shines -- there's tons of it, and it's all wonderfully written, with tiny touches of humor to liven up an increasingly serious and gripping mystery." Nintendo Power gave the game an 8 out of 10, praising the graphics and story while criticizing the game's simplistic puzzles and gameplay.

The New York Times gave Hotel Dusk an average review, calling it "unrelentingly linear". The Sydney Morning Herald gave it three stars out of five, and said: "Having to wait until the game lets you solve a riddle even though you have grasped the solution long ago is particularly galling. Players too often feel like passengers on a scripted ride, rather than individual auteurs directing their own unique experience". The A.V. Club gave it a D+ and pointed out that "while a mystery should keep you alert for clues and misstatements, Hotel Dusk slaps you in the forehead with every new piece of evidence, then patronizes you with reading-comprehension quizzes after every chapter".

In 2011, Adventure Gamers named Hotel Dusk the 65th-best adventure game ever released.

== Sequel ==
A sequel, Last Window: The Secret of Cape West, released in 2010 in Japan and Europe. It takes place in Los Angeles, California during 1980, one year after the events of Hotel Dusk. Due to developer Cing's bankruptcy, Last Window was not released in North America.

== See also ==
- Chase: Unsolved Cases Investigation Division – Distant Memories
- Trace Memory, a similar game made by the same team
