= Glass Rose =

2003 video game

- Developers: Cing; Capcom Production Studio 3
- Publisher: Capcom
- Director: Kazuki Matsue
- Producer: Kouji Nakajima
- Programmer: Keiji Kubori
- Writer: Rika Suzuki
- Composers: Kenjirou Matsuo; Yuichi Nakamura; Ken Inaoka; Keiichi Okabe
- Platform: PlayStation 2
- Release: JP: November 6, 2003; EU: March 26, 2004
- Genres: Point-and-click adventure, psychological horror
- Mode: Single-player

Glass Rose (Japanese: 玻璃ノ薔薇, Hepburn: Garasu no Bara) is a point-and-click adventure psychological horror video game developed by Cing and Capcom's Production Studio 3 and published by Capcom for the PlayStation 2. It was released in Japan on November 6, 2003 and later in Europe on March 26, 2004.

== Gameplay ==
Takeshi Kagetani speaks to Kunio Hachiya. Highlighting words/phrases allows for conversations between him and other characters.

The game mainly uses a point and click system. Players do not control Takashi's movements directly, instead using a cursor to select points of interest in the game's environment. This control scheme is also used in some scenes that are similar to quick time events. Mind Points are used if players fail to complete investigating a certain area within a period of time and when mind reading is used. The game ends if MPs are entirely consumed.

A large portion of the game involves talking to other characters in the Yoshinodou household. While engaging a conversation, the player can use the cursor to highlight words in the text onscreen, which allows Takashi to further inquire about certain topics of discussion.

== Plot ==
Glass Rose primarily takes place in a remote Japanese mansion in 1929. The player assumes the role of an amateur reporter named Takashi Kagetani. While exploring an abandoned mansion with his friend Emi in the year 2003, he is knocked unconscious by a supernatural force and awakens seventy-four years in the past, where the mansion has been restored to its former glory. In order to return to his own time, Takashi is forced to explore the mansion and interact with its denizens, the Yoshinodou family.

Takashi also finds that the time warp has left him with the ability to briefly glimpse into a person's mind while conversing with them. By employing this ability, he can investigate into a series of murders in the Yoshinodou household.

== Characters ==
Takashi Kagetani - The main character of the game. He is said to bear a resemblance to Denemon Yoshinodou's long lost son. This observation later leads to him being accused of the murders. Masahiro Matsuoka from the band Tokio lent his likeness to the character, as well as motion capture and voice acting. He is voiced by Eric Kelso in the English version.

Emi Katagiri - Takashi's friend and Koutaro's granddaughter. After Takashi is sent back in time, Emi appears to him as a ghost-like apparition, and they lose direct contact with each other. She is voiced by Ryoko Gi in Japanese and Lisle Wilkerson in the English version.

Koutaro Katagiri - Emi's grandfather and a former detective. He was called to the Yoshinodou mansion by his boss, Ryouji Ihara, in order to locate Kazuya Nanase for the murder of Ihara's wife. He is voiced by Rikiya Koyama in Japanese and Peter von Gomm in the English version.

=== Yoshinodou Family ===
Denemon Yoshinodou - The head of the Yoshinodou family. He is the first murder victim in what becomes known as the "New World Cinema murders" in 1929. He is voiced by Hiroshi Arikawa in Japanese and Barry Gjerde in the English version.

Hisako Yoshinodou - The first wife of Denemon and an actress. She gave birth to three children: their son, Hideo, and twins Takako and Kazuya.

Yurie Yoshinodou - The second wife of Denemon, she gave birth to 2 children: Kanae and Marie. It is said throughout the game that she was Denemon's most loved wife, but in reality, she was a bitter woman who conspired to kill him. She committed suicide out of paranoia that Denemon would kill her one day.

Ayako Yoshinodou - The third wife of Denemon. She married Denemon in order to use his money to pay off her family's debts, and she is said to be untrustworthy by her stepchildren. Ayako wanted to escape from life in the Yoshinodou mansion but died before she could do so. She is voiced by Miki Yamazaki in Japanese and Rumiko Varnes in the English version.

Hideo Yoshinodou - The eldest son and current head of the Yoshinodou family. He is the husband of Youko Yoshinodou and has a son named Taki Matsubashi. He was the second victim of the murders. He is voiced by Masaki Terasoma in Japanese and Walter Roberts in the English version.

Takako Yoshinodou - The second eldest girl in the family and Kazuya's twin sister, albeit without her knowledge. Following in her mother's steps, she also became an actress, and her fiancee, Kiyohiko Yoshikawa, was helping her career as a director. She is later murdered, and her body is found by Takashi. She is voiced by Saori Yumiba in Japanese and Bianca Allen in the English version.

Kazuya Nanase - Denemon's long lost son. While he is still loved by his estranged father, Kazuya is a vengeful man who orchestrates the murders. He is voiced by Masahiro Matsuoka in Japanese and Eric Kelso in the English version.

Matsunosuke Shimada - A gardener who works for the Yoshinodou family. He is involved in Yurie's conspiracy to murder Denemon. He is voiced by Noboru Mitani in Japanese and Jeff Manning in the English version.

== Development ==
Capcom held a press conference to promote Glass Rose on February 21, 2003. According to Tatsuya Minami, Glass Rose's graphics were inspired by Art Nouveau. He also said that the decision was made to give players the feeling that they're watching an old movie.

Masahiro Matsuoka's voice and likeness was used in the game.

== Reception ==
Reception

Aggregate score
Aggregator	Score
Metacritic	41/100

Review scores
Publication	Score
Adventure Gamers	2.5/5
Edge	3/10
Famitsu	29/40
Jeuxvideo.com	10/20

The game received "generally unfavorable reviews" according to the review aggregation website Metacritic. In Japan, Famitsu gave it a score of one seven, one eight, and two sevens for a total of 29 out of 40.
