= Chaos Break =

2000 video game

- Developer: Taito
- Publishers: JP: Taito; EU: EON Digital Entertainment
- Platform: PlayStation
- Release: JP: January 27, 2000; EU: December 8, 2000
- Genres: Survival horror, third-person shooter
- Mode: Single-player

Chaos Break: Episode from "Chaos Heat" is a third-person shooter survival horror video game developed by Taito and released for the PlayStation in 2000. It is the sequel to the 1998 arcade game Chaos Heat.

== Gameplay ==
Progress through the game is made by defeating the enemies, which in this case are alien parasitic lifeforms, mutated staff members and the laboratory's robotic security drones, collect level-clearance pass cards and data which are CDs. Looting the corpses and lockers for health, ammo and key items to progress through the facility and with an in-game 24-hour clock that affect some of the doors' access window.

An element of survival horror is introduced at the computer terminals, where the player can save their game and read the emails that explain some of the back-story of those who worked at the civilian research facility before the outbreak.

== Plot ==
Set in an abandoned, contaminated biochemical laboratory; Fluxus Biomateril Industries Lab 7, a civilian research facility set on an isolated island. The two playable characters; Mitsuki and Rick, who are D.E.F agents, an investigatory and cleansing task force that are sent out to check the facility, and retrieve the research data.
