= Hard Edge =

1998 video game

- PAL cover art used in Europe and Australia
- Developer: Sunsoft
- Publisher: Sunsoft
- Director: Masayuki Takatsuji
- Producer: Yoshiaki Iwata
- Programmer: Hirokatsu Fujii
- Composer: Atsushi Takada
- Platform: PlayStation
- Release: JP: December 3, 1998; NA: March 31, 1999; EU: May 20, 1999; AU: 1999
- Genre: Action-adventure
- Mode: Single-player

Hard Edge (Note: Japanese: ハードエッジ, Hepburn: Hādo Ejji), released in North America as T.R.A.G.: Tactical Rescue Assault Group - Mission of Mercy (or simply T.R.A.G.), is a 1998 action-adventure game developed and published by Sunsoft for the PlayStation.

A successor game, Hard Edge - War Zone, was released for Windows on July 23, 2026. It is a card battler instead of an action-adventure game.

== Plot ==
The T.R.A.G. team infiltrates the Togusa building, which has been taken over by terrorists, and they attempt to take it back, as well as rescue Professor Kevin Howard, an important scientist who is a hostage of the terrorists.

== Gameplay ==
The gameplay is somewhat similar to that of Resident Evil, with 3D characters moving across pre-rendered backgrounds most of the time.

== Characters ==
There are 4 playable characters, each with a unique ability and also a different fighting style:

- Alex Barrat is a member of T.R.A.G. who is able to use night vision goggles and fights using his pistol.
- Michelle Stevenson is Alex's comrade who fights with a knife.
- Rachel Howard is Professor Howard's daughter who fights with tonfa batons. Her small size allows her to get in tight places.
- Burns Byford is a local detective who was searching for one of the terrorists, Gasshu. He fights with his fists. His strength allows him to move heavy objects that the other characters cannot.

Each character can be switched with another one almost anytime; if the characters are split into two teams, the player is able to explore two areas separately as well. It's notable that there are no new weapons to be picked up during the main game; instead those are obtained only as unlockables after the game's completion.

== Release ==
The game was released in Japan on December 3, 1998, for the PlayStation game console. In Japan, it was later re-released under the PlayStation the Best label in 2000, as well as the value 1500 label in 2001. The game was released emulated on the PlayStation Network as a PS one Classic in Japan on March 29, 2007. It later saw its first worldwide re-release for the PlayStation 5 and Nintendo Switch 2 on July 2, 2026 via the Console Archives series, courtesy of Hamster Corporation.

== Reception ==
Reception

Aggregate score
Aggregator	Score
GameRankings	59%

Review scores
Publication	Score
Consoles +	85%
Computer and Video Games	3/5
Game Informer	7.5/10
GameSpot	5.9/10
Hyper	67%
PlayStation Official Magazine – UK	5/10
Official U.S. PlayStation Magazine	3/5
PlayStation: The Official Magazine	3/5

The game received mixed reviews according to the review aggregation website GameRankings.

== See also ==
- Deep Freeze
