= Another Code: Two Memories =

2005 video game by Cing

- European cover art
- Developer: Cing
- Publisher: Nintendo
- Director: Taisuke Kanasaki
- Producer: Takuya Miyagawa
- Designer: Rika Suzuki
- Programmer: Kazuhiko Hagihara
- Artists: Taisuke Kanasaki; Keisuke Sakamoto
- Writer: Rika Suzuki
- Composers: Makoto Hagiwara; Kenjiro Matsuo; Yuichi Nakamura
- Platform: Nintendo DS
- Release: JP: February 24, 2005; EU: June 24, 2005; AU: July 6, 2005; NA: September 27, 2005
- Genre: Point-and-click adventure
- Mode: Single-player

Another Code: Two Memories, (Note: Japanese: アナザーコード ２つの記憶, Hepburn: Anazā Kōdo Futatsu no Kioku) known as Trace Memory in North America, is a 2005 point-and-click adventure game developed by Cing and published by Nintendo for the Nintendo DS. The game was first released in Japan on February 24, 2005, with releases in Europe, Australia, and North America, following later the same year.

Players take on the role of Ashley Mizuki Robbins (Note: In Trace Memory Ashley's surname is spelled Robbins, while in PAL regions it is spelled Robins. Other games in the series spell Ashley's surname as Robins.), a 13-year-old girl, as she searches for her father on the fictional Blood Edward Island. Gameplay revolves using the DS touchscreen or D-pad to solve puzzles.

Another Code received "mixed or average" critic reviews, according to review aggregation website Metacritic. Though praised for its implementation of the DS controls, its story, and hand-drawn artwork, many criticized the game's short length, unoriginal puzzles, and gearing towards a younger audience. A sequel, Another Code: R – A Journey into Lost Memories, was released for the Wii in 2009 in Japan and Europe. A remake of the game and its sequel were released for the Nintendo Switch as part of Another Code: Recollection on January 19, 2024.

== Gameplay ==
Players navigate through 3D environments and attempt to solve puzzles as protagonist Ashley Mizuki Robbins. During movement, the DS's touchscreen displays an aerial view of Ashley and her surroundings. The player can move Ashley using a point and click system, dragging the stylus across the screen, or using the D-pad. The top screen shows pre-rendered images of the player's current location. To solve puzzles encountered in the game, the player must use the touchscreen, or other DS capabilities, such as the DS microphone.

A device in the game called the DAS (renamed DTS in the North American release) allows the player to save and load, read messages in the form of DAS data cards, and examine photographs. The photographs come from the player's in-game camera which can take up to 36 photographs at a time. An inventory list is also available to store items for later use. The player will sometimes encounter non-player characters in the game. To initiate dialog with them, the player must tap the talk icon.

== Story and setting ==
Ashley Mizuki Robbins is the daughter of Richard and Sayoko Robbins, researchers of human memory. After her parents mysteriously went missing in 1994, they were presumed dead. Consequently, Ashley was raised by her father's younger sister, Jessica Robbins, in the suburbs of Seattle. Around this time, Ashley begins to suffer from a recurring nightmare, in which she is hiding inside a closet as a child and witnesses someone getting shot. Eleven years later, two days before her fourteenth birthday, Ashley receives a package from her father containing a birthday card and a device called a DAS. The DAS, programmed to respond only to Ashley's biometrics, contains a message from her father, claiming that he is waiting for her on Blood Edward Island, an island located off the coast of Washington.

Two days before her fourteenth birthday in 2005, the day before her birthday, Jessica and Ashley ride over to Blood Edward Island on a boat, but Ashley's father is not there to greet them. Jessica goes to look for him, but when she doesn't return, Ashley ventures out to search for both of them. While exploring the island, Ashley also befriends D, a ghost who has lost his memories. D is only visible to Ashley, and wants to learn the truth behind his death. Together they enter the Edward Mansion, each looking for answers to their own questions.

As they explore Edward Mansion, Ashley and D begin to learn the history behind the Edward family, who are rumored to have all died one after the other, resulting in the island's name. At the same time, they begin to unravel the mystery surrounding Ashley's father, Richard, and their invitation to the island. Ashley eventually discovers that her mother, Sayoko, was murdered on the night of her third birthday, her recurring nightmare being a vague memory of that night. She also learns about "Another", a device with the ability to replace someone's real memories with false ones, which was created by Ashley's parents while they worked as memory researchers at MJ Labs. Its purpose was to help those who have PTSD and other forms of psychological trauma, by replacing their traumatic memories. Richard has the memory of being Sayoko's murderer and suspects his memory was replaced. During his time alone on Blood Edward he had developed "Another II", which allowed someone's true memories to be verified and returned, and locked it to the DAS, allowing only Ashley to activate it. After she activates "Another II", Ashley is relieved to find out that her father's true memory of the night of her mother's murder was, indeed, altered to make him remember shooting her mother. She returns his real memory of that night.

Ashley and Richard end up confronting Bill Edward, an old friend of Richard and Sayoko, who was also a scientist. While holding Richard at gunpoint in a cave, Bill forces Ashley to remember the night of her mother's murder, and she realizes that Bill was the culprit. Bill had been in love with Sayoko, however, she was happily committed to Richard. After they had finished the development of "Another", Richard and Sayoko tried to keep it out of reach of those that might use it for malicious purposes, and Sayoko eventually gave birth to Ashley, and gave up being a scientist to focus on her husband and daughter. In his jealousy and his rage over Sayoko's "betrayal", Bill broke into their family home to steal back "Another", shooting Sayoko. Just as Bill is about to shoot Richard, D appears before him and tells him that he's "making Franny cry"; the shock causes Bill to fall down a nearby drop, to his death.

Depending on how much Ashley and D have discovered regarding D's memories and the Edward family, D will either not remember his death, and will, therefore, be cursed to wander the island alone, or he will. In the case of the latter, it is revealed that D's real identity is "Daniel Edward", a young boy from the Edward family. Daniel's uncle shot and killed his father in a tragic misunderstanding over inheritance. Having witnessed this, D ran in fear from his uncle into the cave, where he fell to his death; the last thing he saw was his uncle's outstretched hand, attempting to save him. After this incident, the uncle shot himself out of guilt, and his daughter, Franny, left the island, as the sole survivor of her family, later giving birth to Bill. Having finally found his answers, D is able to depart to the afterlife in peace.

Richard and Ashley meet up with Jessica, and the three leave the island, to now be "together forever". If the player is using a new game plus save data, they will get a post-credit scene where Ashley receives a letter wishing her a happy "sweet sixteen", foreshadowing the events of the sequel.

== Development ==
Cing started development on Another Code in February 2004, and the game was officially announced by Nintendo on October 7, under the working title Another. The first playable demo of the game debuted during the November 2004 Nintendo World Japanese tour. At a Nintendo retailer conference in January 2005, the release date was set for Japan on February 24. The release date for Europe was set on June 24, under the title Another Code: Two Memories. The game was showcased at E3 2005 under the title Trace Memory. It was released in North America on September 27.

The game's designer and scenario writer, Rika Suzuki, said she "prefer[s] stories that are emotionally moving", and that, "one thing that is reflected in my work is the idea of memories as a device for moving the story along. Suzuki has further mentioned memories and recollection are important to her story telling, particularly in regard to her own life experience. "When [my father] was very young he lived in Shanghai, and because of the disease he became able to draw very detailed maps of the area, which he couldn't before. That stimulated me to think a lot more about memory." Suzuki's father had Alzheimer's disease.

Another Code was originally displayed from a quarter view, but was later changed to a top-down perspective due to difficulties with controlling the game using the stylus, and in an attempt to make it more user-friendly for players not used to a 3D game. Taisuke Kanasaki, the game's director and character designer, said that the development team always considers the relation a puzzle has to a game's story, and, "even if we could invent an amazing idea for a puzzle, it might not be adopted without a solid relationship with the story". Suzuki said she thought the burden on the game's programmers was quite large. Lead Programmer Kazuhiko Hagihara reportedly had disagreements with Kanasaki during the latter half of development. The game's protagonist, Ashley Robbins, was designed by Kanasaki to appeal to both male and female players. She was originally designed to be 17 years old, but her age was later changed to 14 by Suzuki.

Ann Lin of Nintendo of America's Product Development Department noted there are several differences between Another Code's original Japanese text and the North American translation. She commented: "I think that a believable character, a believable person would have certain feelings of betrayal, not just acceptance. I wanted to explore that just a little. I think the [Japanese text] was a little more accepting, not really questioning the weirdness of meeting a ghost or any of the [strange] circumstances that had befallen her."

Suzuki later said the game had a large impact in Japan, and that "one thing that I am particularly proud of is that if you go into a games shop in Japan now there is an adventure corner, and that's something that we feel we've contributed to coming back." She also said that "the company feels that with our games you don't need the special skills required to play other games. There is no gender or age classification, it's just you and the story."

== Reception ==
Reception

Aggregate score
Aggregator	Score
Metacritic	70/100

Review scores
Publication	Score
1Up.com	C+
Adventure Gamers	4.5/5
Edge	7/10
Electronic Gaming Monthly	6.17/10
Eurogamer	7/10
Famitsu	35/40
Game Informer	7.5/10
GameRevolution	C
GameSpot	7.2/10
GameSpy	2.5/5
IGN	6/10
Nintendo Power	8.5/10
CiN Weekly	78/100
The Sydney Morning Herald	4/5

Another Code was the 123rd best-selling game of 2005 in Japan, with 105,452 copies sold. The game also placed 32nd on the list of best-selling DS games of 2005 in Europe, with around 15,000 copies sold in the United Kingdom.

The game received "mixed" or average" reviews according to the review aggregation website Metacritic. In Japan, Famitsu gave it a score of 9, 10, 8, and 8 for a total 35 out of 40. The game was considered by many reviewers to be aimed at a younger audience, or "a good introduction to the graphic adventure genre". PJ Hruschak of CiN Weekly commented that some critics referred to the game as "Myst for Kids".

The game was praised for its story and graphics; Matt Wales of Computer and Video Games said: "From the gorgeous hand drawn artwork and gloriously detailed 3D environments to the intimate and expertly paced storyline, the game maintains a light and uniquely engaging atmosphere throughout". Jason Hill of The Sydney Morning Herald said the game possessed "a rich plot exploring themes of love, grief, ambition and memory [that] complements engaging characters", and Kristan Reed of Eurogamer remarked that "Another Code does a great job of structuring the game well to keep you guessing". GamesMaster described the graphics as "an enticing mix of cutesy anime portraits and lovely 3D environments", and Bethany Massimilla of GameSpot thought that "the 2D art in the game is where all the richness of detail is."

Jeremy Parish of 1UP.com complained that the game's puzzles were extremely unoriginal, with the comment that "the devices and gimmicks used to obstruct progress are so hoary that archaeologists have unearthed ancient clay tablets inscribed with Trace Memory puzzle solutions". This sentiment was echoed to lesser degree by several reviewers. However, Parish said that "maybe that's not entirely fair. The DS is. . . [Nintendo's] attempt to branch out beyond traditional gamers; it's quite likely that the target audience for Trace Memory really is 13-year-old girls, just like Ashley". He ended the review by saying: "Trace Memory is the very definition of a safe, comfortable, middle-of-the-road experience."

GamesMaster praised the game's control scheme as "absolutely brilliant" and "[the] best ever". They said that the implementation of DS capabilities would cause players to "re-evaluate the way you approach in-game puzzles", and that "the DS-specific puzzles are, without exception, uniformly fab". He noted that "more action-oriented gamers could well find Another's puzzles linear and obscure, constant backtracking frustrating". The game received praise for its interface from other reviewers: Reed called it "brilliantly implemented", and Wales said it was "fantastically slick."

The game's length garnered negative response from critics, as did its lack of replay value. Massimilla stated that "you could burn through the entirety of Trace Memory in about four or five hours in a single marathon session", and Craig Harris of IGN called it "very, very short for an adventure game". Wales thought that "there's little to encourage replay". The game was also criticized for its use of backtracking; several reviewers were irritated by the game design decision that "certain items can only be collected once you've found a use for them".

The Another Code series is represented in two iterations of the Nintendo crossover fighting series Super Smash Bros. through collectable stickers, a trophy, and a spirit. In Super Smash Bros. Brawl, Ashley appears as a trophy, and she and other characters appear as stickers. Her Another Code: R – A Journey into Lost Memories design appears as a spirit in Super Smash Bros. Ultimate.
