= Satellite Award for Outstanding Puzzle/Strategy Game =

Retired annual media award

The Satellite Award for Outstanding Puzzle/Strategy Game was an annual award given by the International Press Academy as one of its Satellite Awards from 2004 to 2008.

== Winners and nominees ==
Year	Winners and nominees	Developer	Publisher
2004 (winner unknown)	The Guy Game	Top Heavy Studios	Gathering of Developers
2004 (winner unknown)	Katamari	Bandai Namco Entertainment	Bandai Namco Entertainment
2004 (winner unknown)	Ultra Bust-A-Move X	Taito	Taito
2004 (winner unknown)	Pirates!	Firaxis Games	Atari, 2K Games, Feral Interactive
2004 (winner unknown)	The Urbz: Sims in the City	Griptonite Games, Maxis	Electronic Arts
2004 (winner unknown)	Worms 3D	Team17	Sega, Acclaim Entertainment, Feral Interactive
2005	Pump It Up: Exceed SE	Andamiro, Nexcade	Mad Catz
2005	Black & White 2	Lionhead Studios	Electronic Arts, Feral Interactive
2005	The Sims 2	Maxis	Electronic Arts, Aspyr
2006	Company of Heroes	Relic Entertainment	THQ
2006	Dr. Kawashima's Brain Training: How Old Is Your Brain?	Nintendo	Nintendo
2006	Galactic Civilizations II: Dread Lords	Stardock	Stardock, Paradox Interactive
2006	Mercury Meltdown	Ignition Banbury	Sony Computer Entertainment, Ignition Entertainment, Atari
2006	Tetris DS	Nintendo	Nintendo
2007	Medieval II: Total War	Creative Assembly	Sega
2007	Civilization IV: Beyond the Sword	Firaxis Games	Take Two Interactive
2007	Command & Conquer 3: Tiberium Wars	Electronic Arts, TransGaming Inc.	Electronic Arts
2007	Puzzle Quest: Challenge of the Warlords	Infinite Interactive	D3 Publisher
2007	World in Conflict	Massive Entertainment	Sierra Entertainment
2008	World of Goo	2D Boy	2D Boy, Nintendo (WiiWare)
2008	Advance Wars: Days of Ruin	Intelligent Systems	Nintendo
2008	Professor Layton and the Curious Village	Level-5	Nintendo
2008	Sid Meyer's Civilization Revolution	Firaxis Games	2K Games
2008	Spore	Maxis	Electronic Arts
