= CiN Weekly =

- Type: Free weekly
- Owner: The Cincinnati Enquirer
- Editor: Sue Cook-White
- Associate editor: Michael Perry
- Managing editor: Katie Kelley Schmid
- Founded: October 2003
- Ceased publication: July 2009
- Language: English
- Headquarters: 312 Elm Street Cincinnati, OH
- Circulation: 63,000 weekly
- Website: cinweekly.cincinnati.com

CiN Weekly was a free weekly culture newspaper in Cincinnati, Ohio, operated by The Cincinnati Enquirer. It was established in 2003, and in July 2009 the paper was replaced by a Cincinnati version of Metromix.
