= Dark Auction =

2026 video game

- Cover art featuring the main cast of characters
- Developer: IzanagiGames
- Publisher: Good Smile Company
- Producer: Shinsuke Umeda
- Designer: Kohske
- Writer: Rika Suzuki
- Composer: Yuko Komiyama
- Engine: Unity
- Platforms: Nintendo Switch; PlayStation 5; Windows; Nintendo Switch 2
- Release: Switch, PS5, Windows; January 29, 2026; Nintendo Switch 2; June 11, 2026
- Genres: Adventure, visual novel
- Mode: Single-player

Dark Auction (Note: Japanese: 闇のオークション, Hepburn: Yami no ōkushon) is an adventure visual novel developed by IzanagiGames and published by Good Smile Company. The game features a dark anime-style environment and focuses on themes of memory, trauma, and guilt, using a linear and investigative style. It was originally released for Nintendo Switch, PlayStation 5 and Windows in January 2026. The story follows Noah Crawford who is haunted by the memory of his mother abandoning him at a very young age. He lives together with just his father Leonard Crawford.

The game was met with controversy regarding its initial title. Dark Auction earned slightly positive reviews praising the writing handling of themes in the story and the mystery. Critics were divided on the use of AI and grammar mistakes, also highlighting the lack of effort put into the art featured in the game.

== Gameplay ==
Dark Auction is an adventure visual novel video game that casts players in the role of 18-year-old Noah Crawford, an investigator searching for clues of his father's disappearance. The plot is set in November 1981 in West Germany. The game features a 3D environment with point-and-click mechanics. Players explore the area in first person while rooms lock them into place, forcing them to investigate from a fixed perspective.

In exploration phases, players talk to other participants, search rooms and floors, and reveal lies and trauma that leads them to the truth that each person may keep hidden. Once players retrieve information, it is placed in their Word Cloud, which is then used to solve mysteries during every auction. Rather than being an auction with bids of money, the game's auctions are instead bid with the participants memories. They must attempt to win by offering their own memories as bids, using an EPO memory reconstruction device. Memories affected by trauma or secrets can often differentiate wholly, becoming warped and fallacious. If participants offer incomplete memories, their bid fails. When a participant's auction is a success, the truth is revealed—showcasing the dramatic story behind each ill-fated auction exhibit.

== Plot ==
In Dark Auction, players control the protagonist Noah Crawford. Leonard Crawford, Noah's father, has been missing for a few days after receiving a mysterious invitation to attend an auction involving items connected to Dictator X. Concerned for his father, Noah travels to Geheimnis Castle, the site of the auction, located near the Black Forest mountain range in West Germany. Upon entering the castle, he finds his father's dead body slumped on a chair with a strange device on his head. The Auctioneer, the man in charge of the auction who wears a parrot mask, says that he will tell Noah the truth about his father's death as long as he both takes his father's place as a participant and ensures that the other five participants' auctions succeed. Noah does not realize until later that he and the other guests are trapped and unable to escape. In auctions, guests bid for items with their memories. Noah works to solve the mysteries related to the dictator hidden in the auction items, slowly revealing his father's secret. Guests are given an EPO device to bid their memories, when a false memory is bidden, the machine causes the participant's death. When a bidder completes all the 4 stages of memory retrieval, they win the item that they are bidding on. To help each character with their bid, Noah researches their life, discovering various connections to Dictator X.

== Development ==
Dark Auction was produced by Shinsuke Umeda, and planned and written by Japanese video game designer Rika Suzuki. Character design for the game was done by manga artist Kohske, while the game's score was composed by Yuko Komiyama. Umeda had described it as "authentic mystery adventure". In an interview with Netto's Game Room, Umeda had explained that during the initial stages of development, he and the rest of the developer team sat down and talked with Suzuki about multiple artworks that were lost to wars and natural disasters throughout history. He explained that "There are a wide range of artifacts and works of art have been lost that have a long history or certain legends about them that can really add an extra element to storytelling. We decided to incorporate that idea into the thematic core of the game."

== Promotion and release ==
Dark Auction was first teased around August 2023 with the announcement of the game under its original title, Dark Auction: Hitler's Estate. The game was initially met with controversy regarding the original title, which was later changed. Developers initially intended to release Dark Auction in 2024 to Steam and Nintendo Switch, later choosing to delay the game. Writer Rika Suzuki announced it was intended for a 2025 release. In June 2025, Good Smile Company released a trailer titled "Story, Mystery & Bidding". Later that year, further announcements regarding the release on the game were publicized. A playable demo featuring the main cast of Dark Auction, was released on January 22, 2026. Later, on January 29, 2026, the game was released and made available to platforms such as Nintendo Switch, PlayStation 5 and Windows. In Japan, the Nintendo Switch and PlayStation 5 versions of the game were sold digitally for 5,340 yen (¥), alongside physical pre-orders for Amazon and Bic Camera. In February 2026, it was announced that a Nintendo Switch 2 version would be released on June 11.

== Reception ==
Reception

Aggregate scores
| Aggregator | Score |
|---|---|
| Metacritic | PS5: 69/100; PC: 73/100 |
| OpenCritic | 50% recommend (Note: Based on 14 reviews) |

Review scores
| Publication | Score |
|---|---|
| Famitsu | 7/10, 8/10, 9/10, 8/10 |
| Push Square | 7/10 |
| PSX Brazil | 60/100 |

Upon release, Dark Auction received "mixed or average" reviews from video game publications based on the review aggregate website Metacritic aimed towards the PlayStation 5 and PC ports. Fellow review aggregator OpenCritic assessed that the game received fair approval, being recommended by 50% of critics.

José Viana of PSX Brazil commented on the game's story in the first few chapters, calling it "quite interesting". The reviewer praised the game for its art and soundtrack, but noted that they were "nowhere near enough to save this game." Push Square's Jenny Jones wrote "The story premise is slightly bonkers but surprisingly compelling. [...] even with its slow moments and uneven presentation, Dark Auction's writing and mystery kept [us] hooked. The reviewer had compared the auctions to the trials in Danganronpa, calling it "far simpler". Famitsu gave it a score of 30 out of 40, which gained the game a Gold Award in the 2026 Weekly Famitsu New Game Cross Review.

Negative critical response to the game often focused on the "uneven" presentation. Multiple critics condemned Dark Auction for its use of AI and the "handful" of grammatical mistakes. With Jenni Lada of Siliconera stating "Worst of all, there's genAI used for some artistic elements. It's just a shame." While Jenny Jones stated the game had "A handful of typos". Lada had noted that "because of the combination of going with “Dictator X,” erasing parts of actual history, and certain characters' reactions to some memories, it doesn't feel as meaningful. The case investigations and piecing together timelines for each auction aren't terribly exciting."
