= Countdown Vampires =

1999 video game

- Developer: K.2.C.
- Publisher: Bandai
- Director: Satoki Mizuhara
- Producer: Ken Fukaki
- Designer: Susumu Akaishi
- Programmer: Kuniharu Kobayashi
- Artist: Kaoru Kamigiku
- Composer: Kenichi Kamio
- Platform: PlayStation
- Release: JP: December 22, 1999; NA: July 2000
- Genre: Survival horror
- Mode: Single-player

Countdown Vampires (カウントダウンヴァンパイヤーズ, Kauntodaun Vanpaiyāzu) is a 1999 survival horror game developed by K.2.C. and published by Bandai for the PlayStation.

== Gameplay ==
The gameplay is similar to the earlier games in the Resident Evil series, to the extent of being labelled a "clone", although there are some additions like a dart gun as a secondary weapon, used to sedate most enemies (mainly, zombie-like "vampires") and then sprinkle "white water" on them to restore their humanity, instead of simply killing all enemies that approach the player (which can also be done). This encourages the player to use a wide variety of fighting techniques if they want to "save" the enemies. As the game advances, more and more creatures appear (whose origins are not that well explained until late in the game), such as giant vampire bats, werewolf-like creatures, giant humanoid mantis-like insects, giant frog mutants (which are similar to the hunters from the first Resident Evil), and purple blobs. The dart gun does not work on these types of enemies.

It is possible to reload all guns and to switch between the dart gun and a lethal weapon in real-time without having to use the menu screen. It is also possible to reload in real-time before emptying a gun. There is an "e-mail" system in the item storage boxes which is mainly used to further explain and expand the backstory. It is also notable that there are minigames available in the first part of the game (set in a casino), like roulette and slot machines; the money won in these games can be used to buy food and drinks, the in-game recovery items.

If the game is cleared within eight hours, a special story mode is unlocked which shows an altered version of the original story and includes additional characters not present in the first playthrough. This also gives the option to gather the five "Lucky coins". A minigame called "Prince of Darkness" is unlocked by typing "Prince Darkness" in the New Game option of the second disc. In this minigame, the player controls a vampire version of Keith and has to slay humans within a 20 minutes time limit. Game characters appear as enemies, such as Mira, Sheck, and The Man in Black.

== Plot ==
Sea Rim City Police Homicide Detective Keith J. Snyder had a problem which involved his previous partner, Wesley Simmons, so he was assigned, as a disciplinary measure, to be a bodyguard for several VIPs who were key to the inauguration of a new horror-themed casino, the Desert Moon. The problems begin when a fire breaks out and a mysterious black liquid starts to pour out of the fire sprinklers, turning the vast majority of the people into vampires that proceed to devour the remaining survivors. Now Keith must find his way out of the casino and also try save as many people as he can.

== Reception ==
Reception

Aggregate score
Aggregator	Score
Metacritic	41/100

Review scores
Publication	Score
AllGame	2.5/5
Electronic Gaming Monthly	2/10, 6/10, 3.5/10, 4.5/10
Famitsu	30/40
Game Informer	6.5/10
GameSpot	3.3/10
IGN	4.5/10
Official U.S. PlayStation Magazine	1.5/5
PlayStation: The Official Magazine	1/5

The game received "unfavorable" reviews according to the review aggregation website Metacritic. In Japan, Famitsu gave it a score of 30 out of 40. Official U.S. PlayStation Magazine gave it a negative review months before the game was released Stateside.
