= Cing =

Defunct Japanese video game developer

Cing Inc.
- Type: Private
- Industry: Video games
- Founded: April 1999
- Defunct: March 1, 2010
- Fate: Bankrupt
- Headquarters: Fukuoka, Japan
- Key people: Takuya Miyagawa, CEO / President
- Number of employees: 29 (as of Jan. 2006)

Cing Inc. (株式会社シング, Kabushiki-gaisha Shingu) (styled CiNG) was a Japanese independent video game developer based out of Fukuoka. Founded in April 1999, it is known for its close working relationship with Nintendo, a partnership which spanned four projects: Another Code: Two Memories (Trace Memory) and Hotel Dusk: Room 215, along with their respective sequels (Another Code: R - A Journey into Lost Memories and Last Window: The Secret of Cape West). It is also known for the critically-acclaimed Little King's Story for the Wii.

The studio filed for bankruptcy on March 1, 2010.

== History ==
Cing was founded on April 22, 1999 by Takuya Miyagawa and Rika Suzuki, both formerly of Riverhillsoft. Throughout its life, it was a small development house that employed only 29 people.

The studio's first project was providing the core production for Capcom's Glass Rose, a 2003 adventure title for Sony's PlayStation 2 that featured the likeness of Masahiro Matsuoka (from the popular Japanese pop group Tokio) for its main character. Unfortunately, the title failed to prove successful at retail and was never localized in North America, although it did see a European release.

In early 2005, Cing released the adventure title Another Code: Two Memories for the Nintendo DS, marking their first project produced with Nintendo. The game made extensive use of the various unique capabilities of the DS, and proved to be a fairly moderate success. The studio's next project, Hotel Dusk: Room 215, was another adventure title making specific use of the DS functionality, including holding the system sideways to play (similar to Nintendo's Brain Age titles).

On March 13, 2007, Cing announced their next-generation video game title for Nintendo's Wii, titled Little King's Story. The game was released in Australia and Europe in April 2009, in North America on July 21, 2009, and in Japan on September 3, 2009. In November 2009, Cing announced Last Window: The Secret of Cape West, the sequel to Hotel Dusk: Room 215 for Nintendo DS. It was released on January 14, 2010 in Japan and September 17, 2010 in Europe.

Cing filed for bankruptcy in Japan on March 1, 2010. The company was reportedly suffering from liabilities of 256 million yen (USD 2.9m/EUR 2.1m).

== Games developed ==
Year	Title	Publisher(s)	Platform(s)
2003	Glass Rose	Capcom	PlayStation 2
2005	Another Code: Two Memories	Nintendo	Nintendo DS
2007	Hotel Dusk: Room 215	Nintendo	Nintendo DS
2008	Monster Rancher DS	Tecmo	Nintendo DS
2009	Another Code: R – A Journey into Lost Memories	Nintendo	Wii
2009	Little King's Story	Marvelous Entertainment	Wii
2009	Again	Tecmo	Nintendo DS
2010	Last Window: The Secret of Cape West	Nintendo	Nintendo DS
