= Last Window: The Secret of Cape West =

2010 video game

- Developer: Cing
- Publisher: Nintendo
- Director: Taisuke Kanasaki
- Producer: Takuya Miyagawa
- Designer: Rika Suzuki
- Artists: Taisuke Kanasaki; Keisuke Sakamoto
- Writers: Rika Suzuki; Yu Tominaga; Shunichi Nakagaki
- Composer: Satoshi Okubo
- Platform: Nintendo DS
- Release: JP: 14 January 2010; EU: 17 September 2010
- Genre: Adventure
- Mode: Single player

Last Window: The Secret of Cape West (Note: Japanese: ラストウィンドウ 真夜中の約束, Hepburn: Rasuto U~indō: Mayonaka no Yakusoku; lit. "Last Window: Midnight Promise") is a 2010 adventure video game developed by Cing and published by Nintendo for the Nintendo DS handheld game console. It is the sequel to Hotel Dusk: Room 215, starring protagonist Kyle Hyde, and takes place one year after those events. Set in 1980 Los Angeles, the Cape West Apartments, the story deals with a new mystery in a new location, but it also delves into some unanswered questions from Kyle Hyde's past. Last Window was the last game developed by Cing before the company filed for bankruptcy on 1 March 2010. Unlike its predecessor, it was never released in North America.

== Gameplay ==
The Nintendo DS is held vertically, like a book. Last Window introduces an 'Ignore' feature which allows the player to let go the lines of questioning they don't find useful. Ignoring too many lines of questioning, as well as not ignoring enough, may cause an early game over. The player can also get a game over if Kyle says something that can get him in trouble, gets caught with something that isn't his, or is caught within a restricted area by the landlady.

A new story-based feature is the in-game novel Last Window. Every time a chapter of the game is cleared, a new chapter in the Last Window book is made available. The contents of the book complements the game's story, and they can be influenced by the decisions the player makes.

The player can unlock a "Pinkie Rabbit Land" mini-game by either completing the story or by winning it in an optional in-game prize-contest. The game is in the style of a handheld electronic game from the time period of Last Window, based around fictional cartoon character "Pinkie Rabbit". Post-game, the player also unlocks the ability to play the 9-ball mini-game whenever they want.

== Plot ==
The game takes place in Los Angeles in December 1980, one year after the events of the previous game.

In Cape West Apartments, a soon-to-be-demolished apartment block owned by Margaret "Mags" Patrice, ex-detective Kyle Hyde is fired from his job at Red Crown for slacking and receives a mysterious letter. While everyone has secrets and parts of their past they would rather leave buried, for Hyde, the case is taking a more personal twist. As he investigates, Hyde uncovers a story that links his fellow residents, a priceless diamond called the Scarlet Star, and the death of his father Chris. At one point, he reunites with Mila, a character from the original game. Additional discoveries include an incident on Cape West's closed off fourth floor involving a murder and a fire, learning that one of the guests is an old partner of Chris', a crime ring called Condor that is part of the crime syndicate Nile, learning that one of the apartments' employees is working for Nile, and a secret room owned by Condor that is accessible through Cape West's elevator via a secret code (which explains the elevator's technical issues). He also gets his job back at one point. In the end, Kyle finds the Scarlet Star and after having a long talk with Mags, who had found the secret room before, he sends the Scarlet Star to a museum.

== Reception ==
Reception

Aggregate score
Aggregator	Score
GameRankings	80%

Review scores
Publication	Score
Adventure Gamers	4/5
Edge	7/10
Eurogamer	7/10
Famitsu	32/40
IGN	7.5/10
NGamer	84%
Nintendo Life	8/10
Nintendo World Report	9/10
Official Nintendo Magazine	78%
VideoGamer.com	8/10
The Daily Telegraph	8/10

Last Window: The Secret of Cape West received "favorable" reviews according to the review aggregation website GameRankings. In a Kotaku retrospective, Peter Tieryas described the game as one of the best murder mysteries in gaming and that "the narrative is much more organic and one reveal ends up being just one small glimpse through the window of their lives". In Japan, Famitsu gave it a score of one nine, two eights, and one seven for a total of 32 out of 40.
