= Masanori Kuwasashi =

Japanese video game designer

Masanori Kuwasashi (Japanese: 鍬差 政則, Hepburn: Kuwasashi Masanori) is Japanese game designer. He worked at SNK and K2. Originally a movie fan who sought a career in creating such works, Kuwasashi instead was recruited by video game companies, becoming the creator of the fighting game The King of Fighters for which he created gathered multiple characters from SNK IPs and created original characters during the mid 1990s. In the early 2000s, Kuwasashi founded K2 where he was also famous for making several Tenchu stealth games.

== Personal life ==
Masanori Kuwasashi was born in Hiroshima. During his childhood he enjoyed drawing pictures of Yoshiyuki Tomino's anime Mobile Suit Gundam and other mecha anime. Among other manga and anime he enjoyed Devilman, Tensai Bakabon, Ashita no Joe and Tiger Mask while also played multiple arcade games and Super Famicon video games. He worked in the black industry where he did package design for electronic products. Still, he never considering working in a game company. His favorite games were Dragon Quest II, Space Invaders and Super Mario Bros. He was particularly fascinated with the storytelling of Dragon Quest II.

In his high school years, Kuwasashi made a movie with his friends, leading him to wonder if his future could involve making films. He was specifically fascinationed with science fiction and action movies. He saw director Hideaki Anno as one of his favorite icons. After graduating, he joined the Visual Concept Planning Department of Osaka University of Arts, where he followed his desire of making movies. However, he was instead recruited by game designers and his career changed. While he was involved with the narrative of The King of Fighters game he directed, he believes it was not until the Tenchu series that he became a fully fledged writer due to the limitations of fighting games.

== Career ==
Kuwasashi's first work was Baseball Stars Professional, a baseball game similar to the original Baseball Stars and other similar titles from the era, where players compete in matches against computer-controlled opponents or other players across two ballparks. He later created Quiz Daisousasen: The Last Countdown and Neo & Geo: Quiz Daisousasen Part 2, which mix adventure games with questionnaires. That was where he met artist Shinkiro.

Takashi Nishiyama appointed him as the director of The King of Fighters '94, impressed with his work in Baseball Stars. The prototype version of the game was a Double Dragon-style side-scrolling beat 'em up titled Survivor. It was intended to use only core characters from the Art of Fighting and Fatal Fury series, allowing players to control Robert Garcia and Terry Bogard during location testing. The idea was eventually abandoned. However, because SNK was attached to the concept of a crossover between the two series, the staff agreed to pivot the project into an all-star fighting game. Classic characters from Ikari Warriors and Psycho Soldier were subsequently added to the roster. The concept of a three-man team was one of the few ideas retained from the side-scrolling prototype. The game was meant to be action game like Capcom's Final Fight but the rise of popularity of fighting games in the era led to transforming into a fighting game. Among multiple SNK developers, Murahasashi was supervised by Kazuhito Kono. The game had little budget or deadline, reducing strest the developer had. He believed the game would not be popular so he did not care about using other IPs either. However, with the sudden success of The King of Fighters '94 that surprised him himself, Kuwasasashi received complaints about using other SNK characters. Kuwasashi expressed early concerns about introducing a young lead character who might clash with the established veteran fighters, but ultimately believed it would benefit sales. After several discussions, the staff finalized the creation of the new hero, Kyo Kusanagi. They focused on designing him to be a more realistic and relatable character than those seen in other fighting games, emphasizing his youth, personal relationships, and stylish clothing. Other original characaters he created like Rugal, Goenitz and Heidern were named after Kusawashi's favorite anime. Years after leaving SNK, Kuwasashi also heard multiple complaints about The King of Fighters using Fatal Fury characters.

Kuwahashi returned to direct The King of Fighters '95. Production took place at SNK's headquarters in Osaka. Kuwahashi made the plot which was inspired by the Yamata no Orochi myths as both Kyo and Iori Yagami were related to Orochi demon power first seen in this game when Rugal Bernstein develops his maximum power. However, when it came to Kyo's girlfriend mentioned in his file, the director was against using her. Masanori Kuwasashi returned to The King of Fighters '96 were he further wrote the Orochi story arc. Kuwasashi experienced pressure with the annual release schedule and was replaced with battle designer Toyohisa Tanabe, who ended the Orochi arc with The King of Fighters '97.

In 2000, Kuwasashi and Mitsuo Kodama founded K2. Initially, it was a development studio of Activision and was involved in the development of the Tenchu series. In 2003, Kuwahashi became one of the designers for Tenchu: Wrath of Heaven for the PlayStation 2. Kuwahashi was in charge of the A.I. design as well as the capabilities of the boss characters rivaling the stealth games Metal Gear. The game's development lasted 10 months. He was pleased with the original release for the PlayStation 2 but noted the Xbox had issues. He found the development of the gameplay easy to develop. In order to develop the Tenchu games, Kuwahashi researched Japan's past lore. In the next year, Kuwasashi worked in the sequel Tenchu: Fatal Shadows where he is credited as chief planner. He expressed his desire to add fresh content and improved the camera from the previous installment. He was satisfied with the focus on stealth actions as he believed it fitted the characters. He wanted the Xbox Live functions to help players do cooperative gameplay besides adding new content.

After the rights to Tenchu were transferred to FromSoftware, K2 continued to work on the series as well as the Valhalla Knights series published by Marvelous Entertainment, before becoming a Capcom group company in 2008. In the same year, Masanori Kuwasashi and others became independent and established Kurogane Co., Ltd. Its headquarters were located in Fujiidera City, Osaka Prefecture until it moved to Osaka City in 2009.

== Works ==
- Baseball Stars Professional (1990), director
- Quiz Daisousasen: The Last Countdown (1991)
- Neo & Geo: Quiz Daisousasen Part 2 (1992)
- The King of Fighters '94 (1994), director
- The King of Fighters '95 (1995), director
- The King of Fighters '96 (1996), director
- Tenchu: Wrath of Heaven (2003), designer
- Tenchu: Fatal Shadows (2004), chief planner
- Tenchu: Time of the Assassins (2005)
- Tenchu Z (2006)
- Valhalla Knights 2 (2008)
- Samurai Shodown: Sen (2009)
