= Tōru Ōkawa =

Japanese actor and narrator

- 大川 透
- Born: Kagoshima Prefecture, Japan
- Education: Nihon University
- Occupations: Actor; voice actor; narrator
- Years active: 1984–present
- Agent: Mausu Promotion
- Notable credits: Tokyo Ghoul as Kureo Madō; Aldnoah.Zero as Saazbaum; Fullmetal Alchemist as Roy Mustang; Sword Art Online as Heathcliff; Soul Eater as Death Scythe; JoJo's Bizarre Adventure as Narrator; Sengoku Basara 3 as Tokugawa Ieyasu
- Height: 174 cm (5 ft 9 in)

Tōru Ōkawa (大川 透, Ōkawa Tōru) is a Japanese actor, voice actor and narrator. While he went to a College of Art, Nihon University, he started his career as a stage actor, but after he moved to Mausu Promotion, his current agency, he came to focus on voice acting.

== Filmography ==
=== Television animation ===
Year	Title	Role	Notes
1995	Virtua Fighter	Chris	
1996	Chōja Reideen	Leaper	
1996	You're Under Arrest	Tower Employee B	
1996	The Vision of Escaflowne	Gaddes	
1996	Midori no Makibao	Fried Chicken	
1997	Virus Buster Serge	Captain Rick, Man A, Petri's Subordinate B, Simon	
1997	Berserk	Bartender, Sir Laban	
1997	YAT Anshin! Uchu Ryokou	Boss, Man A	
1997	Flame of Recca	Hanabishi Shigeo, Homura, Kondō, Narrator, Setsuna	
1998	Gasaraki	Gowa Operator, Kiou Watanabe, Kiyomu Yonetani, Takeharu Gowa, Tatsumi Wakisaka	
1998	Shadow Skill	Zal Zachary	
1998	Neo Ranga	Makoto Kageyama	
1999	Kakyuusei	Haruhiko Satake	
1999	Kyoro-chan	Dementon, Maya's Father	
1999	The Big O	The Thug	
1999	Power Stone	Okuto	
1999	Detective Conan	Ryuichi Arai, Masayoshi Sato, Tatsuzo Genda, Delivery Man	
1999	Shukan Storyland	Dream Boy, Announcer	
2000	Saiyuki	Crowman	
2001	Baki the Grappler	Igari	
2001	Cyborg 009 The Cyborg Soldier	Cyborg 0011	
2001	Super GALS! Kotobuki Ran	Yamada	
2001	Hajime no Ippo	Kida	
2001	Figure 17	Shinichi Ibaragi	
2001	Rune Soldier	Dandy	
2002	Mobile Suit Gundam SEED	Lt. Cdr Biddaulph, Uzumi Nara Athha	
2002	Ghost in the Shell: Stand Alone Complex	Saito	
2002	The Twelve Kingdoms	Kaname's Father, Kyōki, Shōkō	
2002	Patapata Hikōsen no Bōken	William F. Buxton	
2003	Kino's Journey	Trucker	
2003	Transformers: Armada	Convoy, Scourge	
2003	Fullmetal Alchemist	Roy Mustang	
2003	Zatch Bell!	Circus Director	
2003	Papuwa	Hijikata Toshizō	
2003	Planetes	Norman	
2003	Rockman.EXE Axess	Bowlman	
2004	Mobile Suit Gundam SEED Destiny	Uzumi Nara Athha	
2004	Kyo kara Maoh!	Hiscreif	
2004	Ghost in the Shell: Stand Alone Complex 2nd GIG	Saito	
2004	Burst Angel	Wanted Man	
2004	Fantastic Children	Tooma's Father, Ude	
2004	Black Jack	Doctor	
2004	Pokémon Advance	Suzumura	
2005	The Law of Ueki	Diego Star	
2005	Gaiking: Legend of Daikū-Maryū	Captain Garis, Buby, Daiya's Father, Doctor Two	
2005	Gallery Fake	Keiji Takakura	
2005	Ginga Densetsu Weed	John	
2005	Doraemon	Nobita Nobi (adult), Snowman	
2005	Trinity Blood	William Walter Wordsworth	
2005	Honey and Clover	Mario Fujiwara	
2005	Blood+	James Ironside	
2005	Futakoi Alternative	Ainosuke Futaba	
2005	Shinshaku Sengoku Eiyu Densetsu	Kosuke Anayama	
2005	Sōkyū no Fafner - Single Program - Right of Left-	Tsukasa Saotome	
2005	Fushigiboshi no Futago Hime	Wohl	
2006	Innocent Venus	Maximas Drake	
2006	Utawarerumono	Inkara, Sasante	
2006	Angel Heart	Sōchin's Father	
2006	Glass Fleet	Jirad, Theodoric	
2006	Ginyuu Mokushiroku Meine Liebe wieder	Director Werner	
2006	Kekkaishi	Tatsumi Minō	
2006	Pumpkin Scissors	Ranke	
2006	Kenichi: The Mightiest Disciple	Kozo Ukita	
2006	Megaman Star Force	Dragon Sky	
2006	Higurashi When They Cry	Jirō Tomitake	
2007	Higurashi no Naku Koroni Kai	Jirō Tomitake	
2007	El Cazador de la Bruja	Antonio	
2007	Oh! Edo Rocket	Kinshirō Tōyama	
2007	Gegege no Kitarō	Mitsuo Nezu, Miage-Nyūdō	
2007	Koutetsu Sangokushi	Unchō Sekiwa	
2007	Ghost Hound	Yasuhiro Nakajima, Narrator	
2007	Sky Girls	Tenzen Sakurano	
2007	Nodame Cantabile	Tatsuo Noda	
2007	Magical Girl Lyrical Nanoha StrikerS	Genya Nakajima	
2007	Moonlight Mile	Deputy Director Gainsbourg	
2007	Moyashimon	Ryūta	
2007	Romeo × Juliet	Giovanni	
2008	Amatsuki	Fire Rat, Tadajirō Sasaki	
2008	Gunslinger Girl: Il Teatrino	Lieutenant Colonel Military Policeman	
2008	Kurozuka	Hasegawa	
2008	Code Geass: Lelouch of the Rebellion R2	Commanding Officer	
2008	Soul Eater	Death Scythe	
2008	Birdy the Mighty: Decode	Anchorman	
2008	Neo Angelique Abyss	Nyx	
2008	Neo Angelique Abyss -Second Age-	Nyx	
2008	Web Ghost PiPoPa	Theodore	
2008	Hakaba Kitarō	Mizuki	
2008	Earl and Fairy	Professor Carlton	
2008	Macross Frontier	Elmo Kridanik, Jeffrey Wilder, Narrator	
2008	Blade of the Immortal	Saburō Anotsu	
2008	Fireball	Gedächtnis	
2008	Corpse Princess	Hazama	
2009	Corpse Princess: Kuro	Hazama	
2009	Slap Up Party: Arad Senki	Linus	
2009	CANAAN	Cummings	
2009	Guin Saga	Lunan	
2009	Sasameki Koto	Tenkai Murasame	
2009	Sengoku Basara: Samurai Kings	Tokugawa Ieyasu	
2009	Sora no Manimani	Sayo's Father	
2009	The Book of Bantorra	Mattalast	
2009	Tears to Tiara	Arawn	
2009	Hajime no Ippo: New Challenger	Kida	
2009	Pandora Hearts	Leader, Oz's father	
2009	Modern Magic Made Simple	Company President	
2010	Zakuro	Village Chief	
2010	Katanagatari	Mutsue Yasuri	
2010	Gokyōdai Monogatari	Shōichirō Yamanaka	
2010	Shiki	Toshio Ozaki	
2010	The Qwaser of Stigmata	Shin'ichirō Ōtori	
2010	Durarara!!	Kazutawno	
2010	Hakuōki	Isami Kondō	
2010	Hakuōki: Record of the Jade Blood	Isami Kondō	
2011	Un-Go	Minami Motoyama	
2011	Gosick	Bryan Roscoe	
2011	Suite Precure	Sōsuke Minamino	
2011	Sacred Seven	Onigawara	
2011	Softenni	Monjūrō Sawanatsu	
2011	Battle Spirits: Heroes	Keisuke Saimon	
2011	Fireball Charming	Gedächtnis	
2011	Blade	Hayate	
2011	Manyū Hiken-chō	Hatomune Mie	
2012	AKB0048	Nagisa's Father	
2012	Btooom!	Kiyoshi Taira	
2012	Campione!	Susanō	
2012	Hakuōki Reimeiroku	Isami Kondō	
2012	Horizon in the Middle of Nowhere II	Christopher Hutton, Walter Raleigh	
2012	Is This a Zombie? of the Dead	Demon Baron	
2012	JoJo's Bizarre Adventure	Narrator	
2012	Naruto Spin-Off: Rock Lee & His Ninja Pals	Narrator	
2012	Little Busters!	Kojirō Kamikita	
2012	Moyashimon Returns	Ryōta	
2012	Muv-Luv Alternative: Total Eclipse	Commander Yamaguchi	
2012	The Pet Girl of Sakurasou	Sorata's Father	
2012	Sengoku Collection	Fasad 29	
2012	Upotte!!	Garland, Narrator	
2012	Sword Art Online	Heathcliff	
2013	Sword Art Online: Extra Edition	Heathcliff	
2013	Aikatsu!	Maya Yumekōji	
2013	Cuticle Detective Inaba	Don Valentino	
2013	Dog & Scissors	Fumio Honda	
2013	Koroshiya-san	Police Sergeant	
2013	Kotoura-san	Isao Onozaki	
2013	Samurai Flamenco	Jun Harazuka	
2013	Silver Spoon	Tamako's Father	
2013	Star Blazers 2199	Vals Lang	
2013	Tanken Driland	Wilderness Samurai Wilde	
2014	Akatsuki no Yona: Yona of the Dawn	King Hiryū	
2014	Aldnoah.Zero	Saazbaum	
2014	Hanayamata	Naomasa Sekiya	
2014	The Irregular at Magic High School	Harunobu Kazama	
2014	JoJo's Bizarre Adventure: Stardust Crusaders	Narrator	
2014	Nobunaga The Fool	Mitsutsuna	
2014	Noragami	Tenjin	
2014	Space Dandy	Vestian	
2014	Sengoku Basara: Judge End	Tokugawa Ieyasu	
2014	Your Lie in April	Mr. Miyazono	
2014	Tokyo Ghoul	Kureo Mado	
2015	Tokyo Ghoul √A	Kureo Mado	
2015	Aldnoah.Zero 2	Saazbaum	
2015	Chaos Dragon	Kurama, Reikōretsu	
2015	Concrete Revolutio	Uru	
2015	Gunslinger Stratos	Srinivasa	
2015	JoJo's Bizarre Adventure: Stardust Crusaders Egypt Arc	Narrator	
2015	Mr. Osomatsu	ESP Kitty	
2015	Noragami Aragato	Tenjin	
2015	One Piece	Sengoku	Episodes 703+
2015	The Heroic Legend of Arslan	Karlarn	
2015	The Rolling Girls	Kishō Ōtomo	
2015	World Break: Aria of Curse for a Holy Swordsman	Tarō Tanaka	
2016	Active Raid	Yasuharu Funasaka	
2016	Boku Dake ga Inai Machi	Makoto Sawada	
2016	JoJo's Bizarre Adventure: Diamond is Unbreakable	Narrator	
2016	Nobunaga no Shinobi	Shibata Katsuie	
2016	Mobile Suit Gundam: Iron-Blooded Orphans	Rustal Elion	
2016	Re:Zero − Starting Life in Another World	Russell Fellow	
2016	Time Travel Girl	William Gilbert	
2016	March Comes in like a Lion	Masachika Kouda	
2017	March Comes in like a Lion 2nd Season	Masachika Kouda	
2017	ACCA: 13-ku Kansatsu-ka	Spade	
2017	Fate/Apocrypha	Gordes Musik Yggdmillennia	
2017	Angel's 3Piece!	Masayoshi Sawatari	
2017	100% Pascal-sensei	Heart Technology Pascal	Ep. 21
2017	Elegant Yokai Apartment Life	Keiji Hase	
2019	Boogiepop and Others	Kyōichiro Teratsuki	
2019	JoJo's Bizarre Adventure: Golden Wind	Narrator	
2020	Higurashi: When They Cry – Gou	Jirō Tomitake	
2021	Higurashi: When They Cry – Sotsu	Jirō Tomitake	
2021	Sonny Boy	Voice	
2022	Utawarerumono: Mask of Truth	Dekopompo	
2026	Kusunoki's Garden of Gods	Reiki	

=== Original video animation (OVA) ===
Year	Title	Role	Notes
1997	Legend of the Galactic Heroes	Mattohēfā	
1998	Geobreeders	Hound Yoda	
1998	Weiss Kreuz	Persia	
2003	.hack//Liminality Volume 1	Doctor Makino	
2005	Final Fantasy VII Advent Children	Rufus Shinra	
2017	Mobile Suit Gundam: The Origin	Tianem	

=== Original net animation (ONA) ===
Year	Title	Role	Notes
2018	A.I.C.O. -Incarnation-	Susumu Kurose	
2020-22	Ghost in the Shell: SAC 2045	Saito	
2021	Hanma Baki - Son of Ogre	George Bosch	
2021-22	JoJo's Bizarre Adventure: Stone Ocean	Narrator	

=== Theatrical animation ===
Year	Title	Role	Notes
2005	Final Fantasy VII Advent Children	Rufus	
2005	Mobile Suit Zeta Gundam A New Translation I: Heirs to the Stars	Apolly Bay	
2005	Fullmetal Alchemist the Movie: Conqueror of Shamballa	Roy Mustang	
2010	Atashin'chi	Executive Secretary	
2012	009 Re:Cyborg	Albert Heinrich	
2017	No Game, No Life Zero	Ivan Zell	
2020	Saezuru Tori wa Habatakanai – The Clouds Gather	Misumi	
2025	Zombie Land Saga: Yumeginga Paradise	Prime Minister of Japan	

=== Video games ===
Year	Title	Role	Notes	Source
1997	Lego Island	Papa Brickolini	Japanese dub	
1998	Panzer Dragoon Saga	Zastava		
1998	Sonic Adventure	Pachacamac, Announcer		
1999	Street Fighter III: 3rd Strike	Ryu		
2001	Sonic Adventure 2	GUN soldiers, Announcer		
2008	Street Fighter IV	Gouken	Also Super and Ultra	
2008	Soulcalibur IV	Nathaniel "Rock" Adams		
2009	Sin & Punishment: Star Successor	Deko Gekisho		
2010	Zangeki no Reginleiv	Heimdall		
2012	Fire Emblem Awakening	Reflet (Male)		
2012	ZombiU		Japanese dub	
2013	Dragon's Dogma: Dark Arisen	Seneschal		
2015	JoJo's Bizarre Adventure: Eyes of Heaven	Weather Report, Narrator		
2015	Yakuza 0	Masaru Sera	Also Director's Cut	
2016	Yakuza Kiwami	Masaru Sera		
2016	Detective Pikachu	Detective Pikachu		
2016	I Am Setsuna	Yomi		
2016	Overwatch	Soldier: 76	Japanese dub	
2016	Ys VIII: Lacrimosa of Dana	Dran, Wagmur		
2017	Fire Emblem Heroes	Arden, Valter		
2020	Persona 5 Strikers	Akira Konoe		
2020	Final Fantasy VII Remake	Rufus Shinra		
2023	Final Fantasy VII: Ever Crisis	Rufus Shinra		
2024	Final Fantasy VII Rebirth	Rufus Shinra		

=== Web animation ===
Year	Title	Role	Notes
1997	Tales of Destiny	Daris	
1998	Tenchu: Stealth Assassins	Rikimaru	
1998	JoJo's Bizarre Adventure	Joseph Joestar	
1998	Spyro the Dragon	Dragon Voice	
2001	Max Payne	B.B.	Japanese dub
2002	Onimusha 2: Samurai's Destiny	Tokichiro Kinoshita	
2003	Tenchu: Wrath of Heaven	Rikimaru	
2003	Star Ocean: Till the End of Time	Norton	
2004	Advance Guardian Heroes	Ginjirō	
2004	Bloody Roar 4	Stun	
2005	Kingdom Hearts II	Iago	
2005	Samurai Shodown VI	Kibagami Genjuro, Liu Yunfei and Yagyu Jubei	
2005	Shinobido: Way of the Ninja	Kabuto	
2006	Dawn of Mana	Masked Guru	
2006	Onimusha: Dawn of Dreams	Toyotomi Hideyoshi	
2006	Sengoku Basara 2	Tokugawa Ieyasu	
2006	Lamento -BEYOND THE VOID-	Kaltz	
2007	Super Robot Wars Original Generation Gaiden	Mizal Touval	
2008	Sengoku Basara X	Tokugawa Ieyasu	
2008	Super Robot Wars Z	Apolly Bay	
2008	Hakuoki Shinsengumi Kitan	Kondo Isami	
2009	Hakuoki Zuisouroku	Kondo Isami	
2009	Sin and Punishment: Sora no Kōkeisha	Deco Gekishō	
2009	Soulcalibur: Broken Destiny	Nathaniel "Rock" Adams	
2010	Hakuoki Yugiroku	Kondo Isami	
2010	Sengoku Basara: Samurai Heroes	Tokugawa Ieyasu	
2011	Sengoku Basara: Chronicle Heroes	Tokugawa Ieyasu	
2011	Super Robot Wars Z2: Destruction Chapter	Jeffrey Wilder, Apolly Bay	
2012	Fire Emblem Awakening	Avatar	
2012	Puchimas! Petit Idolmaster	Narrator, Basilisk, Yamata no Orochi (Five - Eight)	
2012	Root Double: Before Crime*After Days	Keiji Ukita	
2012	Tales of Xillia 2	Julius Will Kresnik	
2013	Double Score CosmosxCamellia	Shirosaki Rio	
2013	One Piece: Unlimited World Red	Sengoku	
2014	Puchimas! PetitPetit Idolmaster	Narrator, Basilisk, Supepapupu, Pointy Hair Male, Dog (♂)	
2014	Gakuen Heaven 2: Double Scramble	Sojiro Sakaki	
2014	Sengoku Basara: End of Judgement	Tokugawa Ieyasu	
2014	Sengoku Basara 4	Tokugawa Ieyasu	
2014	Super Robot Wars Z3: Hell Chapter	Jeffrey Wilder	
2015	Super Robot Wars Z3: Heaven Chapter	Jeffrey Wilder	
2015	Bravely Second	Nikolai Nikolanikov	
2015	The Witcher 3: Wild Hunt	Avallac'h	Japanese dub
2016	Ratchet & Clank	Clank	Japanese dub
2016	Sengoku Basara: The Legend of Sanada Yukiura	Tokugawa Ieyasu	
2018	Meitantei Pikachu: Shin Konbi Tanjō	Pikachu	

=== Drama CDs ===
Year	Title	Role	Notes
1998	Tekken	Yoshimitsu	
2005	Koi Dorobou o Sagase!	Yūji Ōkawa	
2005	Are you Alice? - Drink me	The Queen of Hearts	
2006	Are you Alice? - Call me	The Queen of Hearts	
2007	Are you Alice? Alice's Tea Party - Phase 2	The Queen of Hearts	
2007	Fushigi Yūgi Genbu Kaiden	Einosuke Okuda	
2008	Yume Musubi, Koi Musubi	Ryōmei Kōsaka	
2008	Yume wa Kirei ni Shidokenaku	Mido	
2008	Are you Alice? - Alice the gibberish!	The Queen of Hearts	
2008	Are you Alice? - Disappearance curve	The Queen of Hearts	
2008	Are you Alice? - Unbirthday	The Queen of Hearts	
2008	Ai no Kusabi ~DESTINY~	Iason Mink	
2008	Ai no Kusabi ~NIGHTMARE~	Iason Mink	
2008	Ai no Kusabi ~RESONANCE~	Iason Mink	
2010	Abazure	Kaname Kōzuki	
2010	Yasashikute Toge ga Aru	Hayato Takashina	
2010	Turning Point	Endō	
2010	Wakakusa Monogatari ~Kami Hikōki ni Notte~	Narrator	
2010	Karneval	The Mysterious Man	
2011	Are you Alice? - Arrest of the heart	The Queen of Hearts	
2011	Are you Alice? - Fork it over	The Queen of Hearts	
2012	Taiyō no Ie	Kaitō Motomiya	

=== Tokusatsu ===
Year	Title	Role	Notes
1998	Seijuu Sentai Gingaman	Grinjii	Ep. 12
2007	Kamen Rider Den-O	Snowman Imagin	Ep. 45
2008	Kamen Rider Kiva: King of the Castle in the Demon World	Mummy Legendorga	
2013	Zyuden Sentai Kyoryuger	Deboth Chaos	Ep. 44
2013	Zyuden Sentai Kyoryuger	Butterfly Absolute God Deboth	Eps. 45 - 48

=== Dubbing ===
==== Live-action ====
Original year	Title	Role	Original actor	Notes	Ref(s)
1954	Rear Window	Lars Thorwald	Raymond Burr	2012 Blu-Ray edition	
1979	Alien: The Director's Cut	Parker	Yaphet Kotto		
1985	Police Story	Counsellor Cheung	Lau Chi-wing	2012 Ultimate Blu-Ray edition	
1985	Out of Africa	Berkeley Cole	Michael Kitchen		
1985	Mad Max Beyond Thunderdome	Dr. Dealgood	Edwin Hodgeman	2015 Supercharger edition	
1989	The Karate Kid Part III	Terry Silver	Thomas Ian Griffith		
1990	God of Gamblers II	Ko Chun	Chow Yun-fat		
1994	Only You	False Damon Bradley	Billy Zane		
1995-97	ER	Al Boulet	Michael Beach		
1996	Trainspotting	Mikey Forrester	Irvine Welsh		
1997	12 Angry Men	Juror #6	James Gandolfini		
1997	Tomorrow Never Dies	Jack Wade	Joe Don Baker		
1998	Velvet Goldmine	Jerry Devine	Eddie Izzard		
1999	The Adventures of Elmo in Grouchland	Oscar the Grouch	Caroll Spinney		
1999	Magnolia	Officer Jim Kurring	John C. Reilly		
1999	Never Been Kissed	Augustus Strauss	John C. Reilly		
2000	Dancer in the Dark	Norman	Jean-Marc Barr		
2000	Fail Safe	Jimmy Pierce	Don Cheadle		
2001	Exit Wounds	Latrell Walker / Leon Rollins	DMX		
2001	Lara Croft: Tomb Raider	Alex West	Daniel Craig		
2001	A.I. Artificial Intelligence	Gigolo Joe	Jude Law		
2002	The Salton Sea	Danny Parker / Tom Van Allen	Val Kilmer		
2003	Cradle 2 the Grave	Anthony Fait	DMX		
2003	The Matrix Reloaded	Link	Harold Perrineau		
2003	The Matrix Revolutions	Link	Harold Perrineau		
2003	S.W.A.T.	Lieutenant II Greg Velasquez	Reg E. Cathey		
2004	Downfall	Heinrich Himmler	Ulrich Noethen		
2004	Collateral	Felix Reyes-Torrena	Javier Bardem		
2004	The Punisher	Quentin Glass	Will Patton		
2005	Batman Begins	Ra's al Ghul	Ken Watanabe		
2006	The Wicker Man	Edward Malus	Nicolas Cage		
2006	Mercenary for Justice	Chapel	Roger Guenveur Smith		
2007	The Kingdom	Adam Leavitt	Jason Bateman		
2007	The Lookout	Lewis	Jeff Daniels		
2007	Shoot 'Em Up	Hertz	Paul Giamatti		
2007	The Counterfeiters	Sturmbannführer Herzog	Devid Striesow		
2007	Island of Lost Souls	Richard	Nicolaj Kopernikus		
2008	Nights in Rodanthe	Jack Willis	Christopher Meloni		
2008-09	Red Cliff	Lu Su	Hou Yong		
2009	Post Grad	Walter Malby	Michael Keaton		
2009	State of Play	Dominic Foy	Jason Bateman		
2009-23	NCIS: Los Angeles	Sam Hanna	LL Cool J		
2010	Alice in Wonderland	Thackery Earwicket, the March Hare	Paul Whitehouse		
2010	Sarah's Key	William Rainsferd	Aidan Quinn		
2011	Super 8	Colonel Nelec	Noah Emmerich		
2011	Rise of the Planet of the Apes	Chief John Hamil	Ty Olsson		
2011	Dragon	Liu Jinxi	Donnie Yen		
2011	Hugo	René Tabard	Michael Stuhlbarg		
2011	The Ides of March	Paul Zara	Philip Seymour Hoffman		
2011	Midnight in Paris	Salvador Dalí	Adrien Brody		
2011	Morbius	Adrian Toomes / Vulture	Michael Keaton		
2014	Need for Speed	Bill Ingram	Stevie Ray Dallimore		
2014	Need for Speed	Monarch	Michael Keaton		
2014	Pawn Sacrifice	Boris Spassky	Liev Schreiber		
2014	Dumb and Dumber To	Harry Dunne	Jeff Daniels		
2015	Run All Night	Detective Harding	Vincent D'Onofrio		
2015	Sicario	Matt Graver	Josh Brolin		
2015	Ant-Man	Darren Cross / Yellowjacket	Corey Stoll		
2016	Personal Shopper	Ingo	Lars Eidinger		
2016	Alice Through the Looking Glass	Thackery Earwicket, the March Hare	Paul Whitehouse		
2017	Alien: Covenant	Tennessee "T" Faris	Danny McBride		
2017	Spider-Man: Homecoming	Adrian Toomes / Vulture	Michael Keaton		
2017	War for the Planet of the Apes	The Colonel	Woody Harrelson		
2020	White House Farm	DCI Taff Jones	Stephen Graham		
2021-25	Cobra Kai	Terry Silver	Thomas Ian Griffith		

==== Animation ====
Original year	Title	Role	Original actor	Notes	Ref(s)
1999-04	Home Movies	Coach McGuirk	H. Jon Benjamin		
2005	Wallace & Gromit: The Curse of the Were-Rabbit	Victor Quartermaine	Ralph Fiennes		
2006	Bambi II	Great Prince of the Forest	Patrick Stewart		
2006	Tom and Jerry: Shiver Me Whiskers	Red Parrot Stan	Charles Nelson Reilly		
2010-17	Adventure Time	Hunson Abadeer	Martin Olson		
2010-17	Regular Show	Benson	Sam Marin		
2011	The Adventures of Tintin	Thompson	Simon Pegg		
2011	Cars 2	Rod "Torque" Redline	Bruce Campbell		
2013	Tarzan	Jim Porter	Joe Cappelletti		
2016	Zootopia	Stu Hopps	Don Lake		
2016	Ratchet & Clank	Clank	James Arnold Taylor		
2017	Cars 3	Sterling	Nathan Fillion		
