= Tenchu: Time of the Assassins =

2005 video game

- European box art
- Developer: K2
- Publishers: JP: FromSoftware; EU: Sega
- Composer: Noriyuki Asakura
- Series: Tenchu
- Platform: PlayStation Portable
- Release: JP: July 28, 2005; EU: June 23, 2006
- Genres: Action-adventure, stealth
- Modes: Single-player, multiplayer

Tenchu: Time of the Assassins (Note: Tenchu Shinobi Taizen (天誅 忍大全, Tenchū Shinobi Taizen, lit. "Divine Retribution: Shinobi Chronicles")) (published in Japan as "Tenchu Shinobi Taizen") is an action-adventure stealth video game developed by K2 and published by FromSoftware in Japan and Sega in Europe for the PlayStation Portable in 2005. This marks the first game in the series not to be released in North America.

The game features many characters from previous Tenchu games, including some deceased from previous titles. Time of the Assassins includes a "buffed up" mission editor, first introduced in Tenchu Shinobi Gaisen.

== Gameplay ==
The gameplay is like a standard Tenchu title. The player takes control of a skilled ninja assassin and sneak your way through the levels, while eliminating any opposition along the way. The game has a similar control scheme to the previous two Tenchu titles, but the game is harder to play due to the player's field of vision being hampered by a black fog.

The game also features two-player gameplay via ad-hoc, however there is no online infrastructure play in the game. Players can engage in versus and co-op modes, originally from Wrath of Heaven. Multiplayer maps that have been created can be played, as well as some pre-made ones by K2 with various objectives. Playing multiplayer or custom missions now allows the player choose most of the character from the entire Tenchu franchise thus far, including many characters who were killed off in past games.

The game revives the mission editor from Tenchu 2, now returning with even more features. Players can create their own Story Missions, or make custom multiplayer maps which the Versus and Co-op game modes can be played on. Players can save as many maps as they wanted provided they have enough memory stick space. Players can also share maps via memory stick or by uploading them to various fan sites.

One of the more prominent fansites named 'Tenchu Missions' hosts custom missions built for both the Japanese–Asian and European versions of the game. Anyone who has registered and logged in at the website can be able to either upload custom missions of their own to share with other members or download user created missions directly to their memory sticks. As of December 2007 there are roughly 60 custom missions available for download.

== Plot ==
The opening cinematic shows Rikimaru, Ayame, Tesshu (Wrath of Heaven), and Rin (Fatal Shadows) slaying rival ninjas for unknown reasons. Ayame appears again when Tatsumaru (Tenchu 2: Birth of the Stealth Assassins, Wrath of Heaven) appears and challenges Ayame. The recurring villain Onikage appears fighting Rikimaru and the two charge for each other, right before the game's title appears and gets engulfed in flames.

Each character has their own story, which like previous games, follows the basic story-line (defending Lord Gohda and rescuing Princess Kiku) but with new twists. Whereas with Tesshu, his story is a prequel of his Wrath of Heaven appearance, and the player finds out how he was first employed by Zenosuke. Rin's story is a sequel to Fatal Shadows, she finds a man fleeing from his burned down village, where he passes away, Rin promises to get revenge, a lot like what happened to her village. Players can play as Rikimaru, Ayame, Tesshu and Rin from the beginning, and Onikage's story can be unlocked upon the other four characters' story mode completion.

Unlike its predecessors, Time of the Assassins is not driven by a single linear plot, but is actually composed of short stories from the views of each of the characters (including Onikage). Each character has one video that plays as their story begins and one when their story ends. The characters each have their own reasons for embarking on the adventures depicted, yet they all eventually end up encountering Onikage.

== Reception ==
Reception

Aggregate score
| Aggregator | Score |
|---|---|
| GameRankings | 51% |

Review scores
| Publication | Score |
|---|---|
| Edge | 5/10 |
| Eurogamer | 3/10 |
| GamesMaster | 65% |
| PlayStation Official Magazine – UK | 6/10 |
| PALGN | 5/10 |
| Play | 38% |
| PSM3 | 66% |
| VideoGamer.com | 3/10 |
| The Sydney Morning Herald | 1.5/5 |

Tenchu: Time of the Assassins received "mixed or average" reviews, according to review aggregator GameRankings.
