= Tenchu: Dark Secret =

2006 video game

- North American box art
- Developer: Polygon Magic
- Publishers: JP: From Software; WW: Nintendo
- Director: Tatsumi Sugiura
- Producer: Atsushi Taniguchi
- Programmers: Junichi Kawai; Shigenao Kawai; Yuki Ōta; Tominobu Kaieda; Shintaro Minamino
- Writer: Toshiyuki Kaziwara
- Composers: Hideyuki Eto; Koichi Suenaga
- Series: Tenchu
- Platform: Nintendo DS
- Release: JP: April 6, 2006; NA: August 21, 2006; AU: September 21, 2006; EU: November 24, 2006
- Genres: Action-adventure, stealth
- Modes: Single-player, multiplayer

Tenchu: Dark Secret (Note: Tenchu Dark Shadow (天誅 DARK SHADOW; lit. "Divine Retribution: Dark Shadow")) (published in Japan as "Tenchu Dark Shadow") is an action-adventure stealth video game developed by Polygon Magic and published by FromSoftware in Japan and Nintendo worldwide for the Nintendo DS in 2006. It is also the first game in the Tenchu series to be released for the Nintendo system and not to have a Mature rating from the ESRB.

== Gameplay ==
The game allows players to choose between Rikimaru and Ayame, two ninja assassins sent out to save a princess. There are more than 40 missions, as well as local wireless multiplayer combat and Wi-Fi capabilities which can be used to trade, buy and sell items around the world.

== Plot ==
Two years after the Burning Dawn crisis, Azuma Clan ninja Rikimaru and Ayame arrive at the small frontier village of Saiga on the northern outskirts of Lord Matsunoshin Gohda's domain, where they witness a noblewoman being wounded by an arrow during a bandit raid. After driving back the bandits, they confirm that the woman is Princess Shizu, wife of Lord Kagemasa of the Hakkaku province (formerly the Toda province, war-torn since the demise of its previous daimyo, Lord Toda). As it turns out, the marriage was a political one, intended to forge an alliance between Hakkaku and the neighboring Akama, ruled by Lord Tokiyori, an ally of Lord Gohda. However, a year after the wedding, Princess Shizu escaped Hakkaku and took refuge in Saiga. Seeking to help his ally, Lord Gohda sent Rikimaru and Ayame to safely escort Princess Shizu to Gohda Castle.

Upon regaining consciousness, Princess Shizu reveals that Lord Hakkaku would involve her in strange, occult rituals, eventually prompting her to run away; on the night of her escape, she stabbed him in the eye with a small dagger, and is now fearful for her life at the hands of her vengeful husband. Rikimaru informs Lord Gohda of the situation in Saiga, and a decision is made to falsely report the sudden demise of the princess, in hopes of tricking Lord Hakkaku into stopping – or at least delaying – his attacks on the village; meanwhile, Lord Gohda begins to make preparation for war just in case, intending to protect Princess Shizu at any cost.

While Princess Shizu recovers from her wound, Rikimaru and Ayame protect the village from relentless bandit attacks. Upon encountering the leader of the bandits, Rikimaru recognizes him as Akunosuke Murai, a former general of the late Lord Toda, wounded during a battle and missing ever since; the two clash swords in battle, and Rikimaru emerges the victor. Later, the bandits are joined by Lord Hakkaku's samurai, sent to return Princess Shizu to her husband. Eventually, Lord Hakkaku's attempts to retrieve his wife escalate to include sending ninja and even undead creatures, but are successfully rebuffed by Rikimaru and Ayame. Ultimately, Lord Hakkaku decides to ignore any and all attempts at diplomacy and marches his forces into Lord Gohda's domain. In response, Lord Gohda marshals his own troops, reinforced by Lord Akama's men, thus beginning a war with the villainous Lord Hakkaku. However, due to the advantage of having undead creatures under his command, Lord Hakkaku quickly forces the joint Gohda-Akama army into a slow retreat.

After Rikimaru and Ayame defeat Kurokaze, leader of the Furai ninja clan in service of Lord Hakkaku, they learn that Princess Shizu is pregnant. Following another raid on Saiga, Princess Shizu becomes possessed by an evil entity and vanishes from the village. Rikimaru and Ayame find the princess atop a tall cliff, ready to kill herself in order to prevent the birth of her child. Lord Hakkaku appears, seemingly possessed by an evil entity himself, and explains that the occult rituals he performed on Princess Shizu were meant to resurrect the Lord of the Dead and successfully resulted in her becoming pregnant with a demonic spawn. Furthermore, he reveals his intentions of opening a gateway between the world of the living and the underworld, allowing countless demons to pass through and feast on the flesh and souls of helpless humans. Princess Shizu, struggling to resist the demonic possession, flings herself off the cliff, but is caught by Lord Hakkaku before she hits the ground; they both disappear into the night.

Soon after, an ominous castle emerges from the night fog; realizing it is the gateway between the worlds Lord Hakkaku spoke of, Rikimaru and Ayame venture inside the castle and prevent the dark ritual's completion. Lord Hakkaku, revealed to have been long possessed by the demon Kubira, is defeated and killed by the two ninja, and the evil entity possessing Princess Shizu is exorcised using Izayoi, the ancestral blade of the Azuma Clan. The three survivors of the ordeal escape the crumbling castle and return to Saiga. Princess Shizu remains in the village for a while to regain her strength before returning home to her father, while Rikimaru and Ayame, their mission finished, head back to Gohda Castle.

The Hakkaku province replaced their lost ruler with a relative of Kagemasa, but he lacked the skills befitting of a lord, and Hakkaku eventually vanished from history altogether. Meanwhile, unable to find peace at home, Princess Shizu left the Akama province one day, never to be seen again.

== Development ==
Tenchu was developed by Polygon Magic—their first Nintendo DS game—and published by From Software and Nintendo. It was first released in Japan on April 6, 2006, and later that year in North America (August 21) and the United Kingdom (November 24). Tenchu was released exclusively for video game retailers EBGames and GameStop in North America.

== Reception ==
Reception

Aggregate score
Aggregator	Score
Metacritic	37/100

Review scores
Publication	Score
Famitsu	29/40
GameSpot	4.3/10
GamesRadar+	2/5
IGN	3.5/10
Nintendo Life	2/10
Nintendo Power	5/10
Official Nintendo Magazine	30%

Tenchu: Dark Secret received "generally unfavorable" reviews, according to review aggregator Metacritic. In Japan, Famitsu gave it a score of one eight and three sevens, for a total of 29 out of 40.

Craig Harris of IGN wrote that the game's exclusivity to specific retailers was a mark of a specialty product. He said the game's quality was much lower than expected for a game published by Nintendo. Harris added that the game did not use its 3D environments and that a port of the original Tenchu game for PlayStation would have fared much better. He found the music repetitive and unfitting, the gameplay "stiff", and the graphics and story poor.
