= Kusunoki's Garden of Gods =

Japanese light novel series

- First light novel volume cover

神の庭付き楠木邸 (Kami no Niwatsuki Kusunoki-tei)
- Genre: Fantasy, slice of life
- Novel series
- Written by: Enju
- Published by: Shōsetsuka ni Narō
- Original run: April 14, 2021 – present
- Light novel
- Written by: Enju
- Illustrated by: ox
- Published by: ASCII Media Works
- English publisher: NA: Yen Press
- Imprint: Dengeki no Shin Bungei
- Original run: November 17, 2021 – present
- Volumes: 13
- Manga
- Written by: Enju
- Illustrated by: Akira Anzai
- Published by: ASCII Media Works
- Imprint: Dengeki Comics NEXT
- Magazine: ComicWalker (Note: ComicWalker changed its name to KadoComi (カドコミ) in December 2023.)
- Original run: November 15, 2021 – present
- Volumes: 6
- Anime television series
- Directed by: Sekijuu Sekino
- Written by: Yūji Kobayashi
- Music by: R.O.N
- Studio: Juvenage
- Licensed by: Crunchyroll: SEA: Medialink
- Original network: ANN (TV Asahi), BS Asahi
- Original run: April 5, 2026 – June 21, 2026
- Episodes: 12
- icon

Kusunoki's Garden of Gods (Japanese: 神の庭付き楠木邸, Hepburn: Kami no Niwatsuki Kusunoki-tei) is a Japanese light novel series written by Enju and illustrated by ox. It began serialization on the user-generated novel publishing website Shōsetsuka ni Narō in April 2021 and is ongoing. It was later acquired by ASCII Media Works who began publishing it under their Dengeki no Shin Bungei imprint in November 2021. A manga adaptation illustrated by Akira Anzai began serialization on Kadokawa's ComicWalker manga website in November 2021. An anime television series adaptation produced by Juvenage aired from April to June 2026.

== Plot ==
Minato Kusunoki ends up becoming the caretaker of family-owned house in the countryside. However, it turns out to be overrun by evil spirits. Minato wipes out all the evil spirits with his strong exorcism powers without even realizing it. Now that the evil spirits are exorcized, various unique gods begin to gather in the house and giving him many blessings.

== Characters ==
Minato Kusunoki (楠木湊, Kusunoki Minato)
Voiced by: Shogo Sakata
Yamagami (山神)
Voiced by: Shinshū Fuji
Seri (セリ)
Voiced by: Shinnosuke Tokudome
Torika (トリカ)
Voiced by: Minako Kotobuki
Utsugi (ウツギ)
Voiced by: Makoto Koichi
Saiga Harima (播磨才賀, Harima Saiga)
Voiced by: Yūichirō Umehara
Fūjin (風神)
Voiced by: Yoshiki Nakajima
Raijin (雷神)
Voiced by: Daiki Kobayashi
Reiki (霊亀)
Voiced by: Tōru Ōkawa
Ōryū (応龍)
Voiced by: Kōji Yusa
Kirin (麒麟)
Voiced by: Show Hayami
Hōō (鳳凰)
Voiced by: Hiroki Takahashi

== Media ==
=== Light novel ===
Written by Enju, Kusunoki's Garden of Gods began serialization on the user-generated novel publishing website Shōsetsuka ni Narō on April 14, 2021. It was later acquired by ASCII Media Works who began releasing it with illustrations by ox under their Dengeki no Shin Bungei light novel imprint on November 17, 2021. Thirteen volumes have been released as of August 2026. The series is licensed in North America by Yen Press.

No.	Original release date	Original ISBN	North American release date	North American ISBN
1	November 17, 2021	978-4-04-914102-3	October 29, 2024	978-1-9753-9078-5
2	May 17, 2022	978-4-04-914408-6	May 13, 2025	978-1-9753-9080-8
3	December 17, 2022	978-4-04-914409-3	November 25, 2025	978-1-9753-9082-2
4	March 17, 2023	978-4-04-914929-6	June 9, 2026	979-8-8554-0845-4
5	August 17, 2023	978-4-04-915063-6	November 10, 2026	979-8-8554-0847-8
6	January 17, 2024	978-4-04-915363-7	—	—
7	June 17, 2024	978-4-04-915661-4	—	—
8	October 17, 2024	978-4-04-915939-4	—	—
9	March 17, 2025	978-4-04-916269-1	—	—
10	July 17, 2025	978-4-04-916428-2	—	—
11	November 17, 2025	978-4-04-916430-5	—	—
12	April 17, 2026	978-4-04-916433-6	—	—
13	August 17, 2026	978-4-04-952411-6	—	—

=== Manga ===
A manga adaptation illustrated by Akira Anzai began serialization on Kadokawa's ComicWalker manga website on November 15, 2021. The manga's chapters have been collected by ASCII Media Works into six tankōbon volumes as of September 2026.

No.	Release date	ISBN
1	August 26, 2022	978-4-04-914562-5
2	March 25, 2023	978-4-04-914954-8
3	January 26, 2024	978-4-04-915506-8
4	December 26, 2024	978-4-04-916118-2
5	December 27, 2025	978-4-04-916891-4
6	September 26, 2026	978-4-04-952443-7

=== Anime ===
An anime television series adaptation was announced on July 14, 2025. It is produced by Juvenage and directed by Sekijuu Sekino, with series composition handled by Yūji Kobayashi, characters designed by Yūko Inoue and Chikako Noma, and music composed by R.O.N. The series aired from April 5 to June 21, 2026, on the NUMAnimation programming block on TV Asahi and its affiliates. The opening theme song is "Odoroki no Ko" (驚きの子; 'Child of Surprise') performed by Miyu Irino, and the ending theme song is "Utamahi" (うたまひ) performed by Jyocho. Crunchyroll is streaming the series. Medialink licensed the series.

==== Episodes ====
No.	Title	Directed by (Note: Production staff information is taken from the ending credits of each episode.)	Written by	Storyboard by	Original release date
1	"A Mountain God Visits the Garden of Gods"; Transliteration: "Kami no Niwa ni Yama no Kami, Kitaru" (Japanese: 神の庭に山の神、来たる)	Rintarō Kitabayashi	Yūji Kobayashi	Jutaro Sekino	April 5, 2026
Young Minato Kusunoki sees a Zashiki-warashi, confirming he has the family ability to see benevolent spirits. As a teenager Minato is made caretaker for the home of a deceased relative. Unknown to him the house is infested with wicked spirits that he cannot see, but his spirit powers are so strong they are exorcised when he enters the house. Soon he is visited by a wolf Yamagami; the Mountain God. Yamagami explains he has been weakened for some time, allowing spirits to run wild, but Minato's handwriting possesses the power of exorcism, so by writing on post-it notes he unintentionally exorcised the house. Minato carves a nameplate for the house, preventing evil spirits entering. Later, exorcist Saiga Harima is amazed the oblivious Minato exorcises a spirit just by walking through it. Yamagami restores the garden and also summons marten spirits Seri, Torika and Utsugi. Harima visits to ask for Minato's help as an exorcist. He is amazed Minato's talisman that exorcised the spirit was a handwritten shopping list. Minato writes him another list which Harima insists on paying ¥100,000 for. Feeling guilty at the amount, Minato insists on drawing an additional pentagram on Harima's hand. Later, Harima saves his comrades Katsuragi and Horikawa from a powerful spirit using the pentagram, leaving him shocked.
2	"The Shrine in the Mountain and the Sacred Tree in the Garden"; Transliteration: "Onyama no Hokora to, Niwa no Go-Shinboku" (Japanese: 御山の祠と、庭の御神木)	Aiko	Yūji Kobayashi	Jutaro Sekino	April 12, 2026
Minato runs out of money buying offerings for Yamagami and the martens. Later, he wins ¥100,000 on a raffle. Yamagami reveals another God has moved into the garden, Reiki the turtle, one of the Four Heavenly Beasts of Luck, who was saved from possession when Minato banished the spirit Harima was chasing. Next, Minato wins a sweepstake of ¥1Million. Reiki gifts Minato seeds to plant. The Gods Fujin and Raijin visit and in exchange for offerings Fujin grants Minato wind magic. Harima continues exorcising using the shopping list and pentagram, making exorcist Seishiro jealous. Reiki's seeds begin growing into a sacred Camphor tree. Minato decides to climb Mount Hojo and clean Yamagami's neglected shrine. An evil spirit appears nearby, so Minato writes another list and throws it using wind magic, exorcising the spirit and freeing a kirin it was possessing, who quickly departs. A dragon visits the house, revealing it is Ouryo, the second Heavenly Beast. Ouryo summons rain which grows the Camphor into an adult tree. Harima, who can't see the Gods, visits to buy more lists written on business cards so he can throw them like shuriken. He also asks for a square grid on his hand, his family crest, instead of a pentagram. Later, Seishiro locates and applies a tracking talisman to Minato.
3	"Training Wind Power in the Sacred Ground"; Transliteration: "Kaze no Chikara, Shiniki nite Shugyō Seyo" (Japanese: 風の力、神域にて修行せよ)	Asahi Yoshimura	Ryōta Suzuki	Masatoshi Hakata	April 19, 2026 (Note: This episode aired at 2:00 a.m. JST, 30 minutes after the original air time on ANN.)
Seishiro visits, planning to demand Minato work for him, but Yamagami secretly sends him to a dark dimension to be killed repeatedly. The bun shop owner, Echigo, mentions Yamagami helped him when he was young. Minato notices Echigo appears healthier, but Yamagami reveals Echigo is terminally ill, so he blessed him with vitality until his grandson can inherit his shop. Seishiro eventually prays for forgiveness, so Yamagami lets him go. Minato admits he misses the hot spring from his hometown, so Yamagami, Ouryo and Reiki create one in the garden. The kirin visits to thank Minato for freeing him, revealing he is Kirin, the third of the Heavenly Beasts. He is surprised Minato doesn't want a reward as he is used to selfish humans. Fujin and Raijin start to grow into adults as a result of Minato's respect. Fujin notices Minato is repressing his wind magic from fear of hurting people. Minato's mother messages him the nameplate he carved for their house is broken. Yamagami suggests Zashiki-warashi is warning them the protective energy has run out. The martens create a temporary dimension for Minato to harmlessly train magic. Kirin leaves a Durian fruit for Minato, but it is rejected by Ouryo and Reiki because of its stench. After training, Minato creates a more powerful nameplate. Harima discovers a temple emitting miasma.
4	"Off to the Other World to Exorcise the Evil Spirit"; Transliteration: "Kotokai no Akuryō Barai e, Iza Shutsujin" (Japanese: 異界の悪霊祓いへ、いざ出陣)	Ryō Yamauchi	Yūji Kobayashi	Ryō Yamauchi	April 26, 2026
Minato continues to improve his wind powers. Despite leaving more gifts for him Kirin continues to be nervous around Minato. Harima visits to beg Minato to banish a cursed doll that has become an evil spirit. Due to its sheer malevolence normal exorcists cannot even approach it within its own extra dimensional space. In exchange for an offering of sweets Yamagamai sends the martens to assist Minato. Inside the extra dimension the doll destroys Minato's shopping lists, injures the martens and captures Minato. Yamagami sends the martens some of his power, so they incapacitate the doll, which Minato purifies by writing on its face. The cause of the impurity that corrupted the doll is revealed to be a former god. Minato discovers his normal writing is not powerful enough to purify a god, but the martens reveal he has a sacred Camphor leaf in his jacket. Writing on the leaf, the god is purified and the dimension begins to collapse. Fujin and Raijin help them escape so they do not disappear into oblivion. Harima thanks Minato with even more sweets. Minato thanks the Camphor for its leaf. The purified god recovers and is revealed to be Ho'o the Phoenix, the fourth Heavenly Beast.
5	"The Sacred Ground of the Goddess and the Power to Seal Things"; Transliteration: "Megami no Shin'iki to, Tojikomeru Chikara" (Japanese: 女神の神域と、閉じ込める力)	Yoshitaka Nagaoka	Yūji Kobayashi	Jutaro Sekino	May 3, 2026
Portals to abandoned dimensional spaces begin appearing everywhere, so Yamagami intervenes. Fujin and Raijin warn Minato humans that wander into these portals can end up lost forever. Voices warn Minato to avoid a nearby shrine, but a portal opens inside the shrine that absorbs Minato and Ho'o. Wandering around he finds the sleeping Goddess that created the space, who realises her power has diminished due to humans neglecting her shrine. As Minato has Fujin's wind magic she asks him to get rid of the miasma that has filled the dimension. In exchange for Camphor leaves the Goddess grants him the power to seal that which cannot be seen. She explains humans usually pray to her to take away what they cannot handle or do not like about themselves, such as unfulfilled dreams and jealousy. The martens rescue Minato and deduce the Goddess was Amaterasu, shocking him. They also explain the voices that tried to warn him were wind spirits and he will see them clearer if he trains the ability. Harima comes into conflict with a team of untrustworthy exorcists who charge high fees for exorcisms. Due to closing all the portals Yamagami reverts to a puppy, so Minato decides to keep feeding him snacks until hew returns to his real size.
6	"Welcome to the Spring Garden"; Transliteration: "Haru no Niwa ni, Zokuzoku to Okoshiyasu" (Japanese: 春の庭に、ぞくぞくとおこしやす)	Rintarō Kitabayashi	Ryōta Suzuki	Yoshimaki Hiraike	May 10, 2026
Minato decides to train his power to seal the unseen, hoping if he can seal exorcism power in an object then it might be useful for Harima. As the house is for sale, Minato wonders why potential buyers keep cancelling. Yamagami sends Minato foraging for bamboo shoots, claiming they will help his training. Fujin and Raijin are revealed to be driving buyers away so Minato never leaves. Fujin considers giving Minato more powers, but Yamagami warns it risks Minato no longer remaining human. A bear approaches Minato, but Yamagami reassures him the bear is a servant of Kirin offering to harvest the bamboo. Minato is confused how eating bamboo helps training, but Yamagami reveals it is about relaxing as Minato has been stressed. The God Ebisu visits and trades Taiyaki for using the hot spring but notes Minato is something other than human. A black fox named Tsumugi visits, explaining she is a servant of the God of the neighbouring mountain, and in exchange for Inarizushi she gives Minato a golden peach. Minato worries being non-human might change him, but Yamagami assures him there is nothing to worry about. Yamagami hints a clue to sealing might be in Minato's past. Minato recalls the Zashiki-warashi was the first spirit he saw when he was five.
7	"The Key to Unlocking the Power is in the Memories"; Transliteration: "Chikara no Kagi wa, Omoide no Naka ni" (Japanese: 力の鍵は、想い出の中に)	Jun Nagahisa	Yūji Kobayashi	Jutaro Sekino	May 17, 2026
Minato further recalls becoming friends with Warashi. When one yokai, Hihi, began picking on him his grandfather told him to find a way to get along, so Minato began using sweets as offerings. After his grandfather died Minato was attacked by an unfriendly yokai, but it was banished by a travelling exorcist. The exorcist complimented Minato's handwriting, after which Minato carved the inn's nameplate. Minato is certain the man knew his handwriting contained power. Yamagami is certain Minato's power to seal is connected to the memory of that exorcist. Minato imagines sealing his pure heart into a talisman, and finally succeeds. Elsewhere, Harima keeps Minato's identity secret from his five exorcist sisters. On his next trip to Minato's Harima receives the improved sealing talismans. Another abandoned dimension absorbs Minato and Yamagami. Minato finds the God sealed inside a sword, and after purifying it the dimension starts to collapse. Seishiro is shown to be less arrogant as dying repeatedly left him with a phobia of bells, which his assistant Horikawa takes advantage of. Minato escapes the dimension right next to Harima and his sisters but leaves without meeting them. As the new God is drained Minato places it in the garden to recover.
8	"Ancient Connection with the Neighbouring Mountain"; Transliteration: "Tonari no O Yama ni, Inishie Yori no In'nen Ari" (Japanese: 隣の御山に、いにしえよりの因縁あり)	Asahi Yoshimura	Yūji Kobayashi	Masatoshi Hakata	May 24, 2026
Yamagami alters the garden to include a waterfall, but shrinks to a puppy again. Koi appear in the stream, servants of the God of the neighbouring mountain, whom Yamagami is not on good terms with. A dragon friend of Ouryo appears with sweets for Minato, who feeds them all to Yamagami, but he still does not return to normal size yet. Yamagami and Minato are visited by the other God, Tenko, a female nine-tailed fox who rudely demands Minato visit her mountain. Harima reports to his superiors that he saw scam-artist exorcist Ansho in their territory. Dead branches fall off the Camphor, so Minato carves the wood into charmed keychains for his parent's inn. He also gives one to Yamagami. A squirrel visits and requests a keychain, which it uses to cleanse its baby of miasma. Tenko possesses Tsumugi to enter the garden and demands Minato offer her inarizushi. Yamagami is outraged she entered the garden without permission and the two fight. Minato is almost hurt, but Yamagami sacrifices his keychain to save his life. Tenko blames Yamagami's reliance on humans for his current weakness. Harima catches Ansho conning elderly people and expels him from their territory. As they flee, Ansho's partner finds the keychain the squirrel dropped.
9	"Uninvited Guests While Walking Around Town"; Transliteration: "Machi-meguri no Ma ni, Maneka Rezaru Kyaku" (Japanese: 町巡りの間に、招かれざる客)	Yoshitaka Nagaoka	Ryōta Suzuki	Jutaro Sekino & Masayoshi Nishita	May 31, 2026
Minato worries Yamagami is still a puppy and seems depressed. Yamagami visits Musashi Publishing, who writes his favourite magazine. Towada, a depressed writer, keeps being possessed by evil spirits, so he is shocked when Yamagami exorcises the latest spirit. Towada is grateful to learn Yamagami reads his articles on Japanese sweets. The employees gather to welcome Yamagami, as he was good friends with the company founder. They enthusiastically agree with Yamagami's request to write about smooth bean paste sweets. They visit Mimasaka Diner, popular with other humans that are friends with Gods and spirits. Yamagami reveals there is a tsukumogami in their house, the wind chime. There is also one in the restaurant, the doorbell, which only rings when spirits enter, letting staff know to bring an extra menu. Ansho and his partner Enno break into the house looking for more keychains. The martens trap them in a maze of endless hallways before dumping them outside. Terrified, they flee. Minato encounters an elderly lady praying to a Jizo statue of Yamagami, who suddenly grows into an adult again. Minato is confused, but Yamagami explains he stayed a puppy because he was depressed that morning's magazine was on chunky bean paste, but the woman's prayer made him happy again. Enno refuses to leave until they have made enough money, but an abandoned dimension opens above them.
10	"Unsolicited Training with a Raging God"; Transliteration: "Araburukami to, Nozomanu Shugyō e" (Japanese: 荒ぶる神と、望まぬ修行へ)	Yoshitaka Nagaoka, Ryō Yamauchi & Rintarō Kitabayashi	Yūji Kobayashi	Jutaro Sekino	June 7, 2026
Harima admits Minato's improved talismans are a big help, but so many evil spirits are being drawn to the town the talismans do not last long. Harima drops of numerous gifts from his sisters who appreciate "the Jade One". Amaterasu's brother Susano'o barges into the garden to judge whether Minato is worthy of Amaterasu's sealing power. Before they can talk Susano'o gets in a fight with his own eight-headed snake Yamata no Orochi. Minato stops the fight with wind magic, intriguing Susano'o, so he drags an unwilling Minato to his dimension for training. Susano'o is disappointed Minato has barely trained his wind powers when he is the first human Fujin ever gave powers to. Ansho and Enno sabotage the talismans Harima placed around town, reasoning the more evil spirits there are the more people they can con. Hundreds of spirits begin spawning nearby, so Harima and Katsuragi rush over. Minato finally generates a wind slash powerful enough to impress Susano'o. He admits he wants Minato as powerful as possible to support Yamagami in battle. Amaterasu arrives to drag Susano'o home for inconveniencing Minato. Harima discovers the spirits are coming from a kami dimension that moves around to spread the spirits as far as possible.
11	"The Grudge of Evil Spirits Defile the Festival"; Transliteration: "Akuryō no Urami ga, Matsuri o Kegasu" (Japanese: 悪霊の恨みが、祭りを穢す)	JOL-chan	Yūji Kobayashi	Norikazu Ishigooka & Ryō Yamauchi	June 14, 2026
Hojo festival arrives, with Yamagami revealing it was once a festival to honour his generosity. Seishiro's partner Horikawa receives an anonymous tip from a civilian than Ansho and Enno are hiding nearby. Minato encounters the civilian and recognises him as the travelling exorcist he met as a child, though he quickly vanishes. Fujin and Raijin arrive with news of the moving dimension. Yamagami reckons the dimension contains something powerfully evil. Harima and his team catch Ansho and Enno who confess to taking advantage of the moving dimension. The dimension appears again, and nearby humans become sick from miasma. Yamagami realises the powerful spirit inside is resentful its God abandoned it. Yamagami forces it closed, but the spirits continue spreading miasma. Minato runs to get materials for talismans, leaving Harima and his team to protect the town. The dimension reopens over Minato's house as the spirit targets the nearest God, Yamagami. Yamagami starts to fade as human worship is being blocked by the miasma so he can no longer maintain a body. Minato rushes to town with his talismans, where the travelling exorcist recognises him as the boy with the powerful handwriting. Harima's sisters join the fighting. Minato's talismans are blown away and Yamagami instantly shrinks to a puppy saving Minato's life.
12	"Kusunoki's Garden of Gods"; Transliteration: "Kami no Niwatsuki Kusunoki-tei" (Japanese: 神の庭付き楠木邸)	Ryō Yamauchi & Rintarō Kitabayashi	Yūji Kobayashi	Jutaro Sekino	June 21, 2026
Tenko arrives and warns Yamagami humans are not worth sacrificing himself. Yamagami insists some humans are worth it, and closes the dimension. The resentful spirit escapes but Yamagami's power is gone. The air spirits return Minato's lost talismans which he throws at the spirit, but they do not make it past the miasma. Remembering a spinning top game he taught Yamagami earlier, Minato rotates the talismans at high speeds with wind magic to increase their power. Tenko changes her mind and protects Minato from the lesser spirits. The talismans destroy the resentful spirit, causing the miasma to fade. The humans recover, and their gratitude returns Yamagami to normal. Tenko departs, glad Yamagami found one of the good humans. Ansho and Enno try to slip away but are caught by the travelling exorcist. The festival is a huge success. Several days later, Harima confirms Ansho and Enno are living quietly elsewhere. Katsuragi suspects he knows the man who captured them. Tsumugi visits Minato, as does Ebisu, Susano'o, Yamata No Orochi and Amaterasu for a drinking party. Harima visits for talismans, as another evil spirit has taken over the cemetery. The God Minato rescued from the sword dimension some time ago finally recovers in the form of an Ezo flying squirrel, whom Minato welcomes to the Garden.

== Reception ==
The series was ranked tenth in the tankōbon category in the 2022 Next Light Novel Awards.

== See also ==
- They Don't Know I'm Too Young for the Adventurer's Guild, another light novel series with the same illustrator
