= Tenchu 2: Birth of the Stealth Assassins =

2000 video game

- North American box art
- Developer: Acquire
- Publishers: WW: Activision; JP: Acquire
- Director: Takuma Endo
- Producers: Yutaka Hoshina; Masami Yamamoto
- Designers: Nobuhito Kuramochi; Yoshiaki Arimura
- Programmer: Daisuke Hisamatsu
- Artists: Kiyoshi Arai; Koshi Nakanishi
- Writer: Mikasa Hiragi
- Composer: Noriyuki Asakura
- Series: Tenchu
- Platform: PlayStation
- Release: NA: August 8, 2000; EU: September 8, 2000; JP: November 30, 2000
- Genre: Stealth
- Mode: Single-player

Tenchu 2: Birth of the Stealth Assassins (Note: Japanese: 立体忍者活劇 天誅 弐, Hepburn: Rittai Ninja Katsugeki Tenchū Ni; lit. "Stereoscopic Ninja Theatrical Drama: Divine Retribution 2") (published in Japan as "Rittai Ninja Katsugeki: Tenchu 2") is a 2000 stealth video game developed by Acquire for the PlayStation. Being the second entry in the Tenchu series, it was published in the West by Activision and in Japan by Acquire. Tenchu 2 is a prequel to Tenchu: Stealth Assassins (1998), following the early lives of Azuma ninja Rikimaru and Ayame as they and their fellow Tatsumaru must confront a militant force called the Burning Dawn. Gameplay follows the chosen protagonist as they complete missions, the goal being to remain undetected and either avoid or silently kill enemies.

Production on Tenchu 2 began following the original's success at the request of Activision. Originally intended as a Western exclusive, consequent adjustments were made to reduce its niche Japanese elements while also polishing the gameplay and graphics. Composer Noriyuki Asakura returned from the first game. Reaching high positions on sales charts, it saw praise from critics and was generally seen as an improvement over its predecessor. Following Tenchu 2, Activision acquired the intellectual property and shifted production to newly-formed company K2 for the next entry Tenchu: Wrath of Heaven.

== Gameplay ==
The game consists of controlling a character in a 3D environment through a third-person viewpoint. The player can use a variety of ninja tools and equipment and stealth to dispatch enemies and complete the game's missions. Missions are set in different locales at varying times of day, ranging from rural farmland, bamboo forests, mountainous regions, beaches, ships, villages and caverns. After the player completes a mission, they are given a rank depending on their accomplishments during that mission such as number of enemies killed, number of times spotted etc. High ranks are then used to unlock special gadgets that can be used in-game. One of the game's most acclaimed features was the Mission Editor. This gave the player the opportunity to create their own missions, including level layout, deciding which characters to place in it and mission objectives to complete.

== Synopsis ==
Tenchu 2 is set in Japan during the Sengoku period, four years prior to the events of Tenchu: Stealth Assassins. Following the death of the elder Lord Godha, a coup against his benevolent son Matsunoshin is launched by his uncle Motohide. Each is supported by a ninja clan; Matsunoshin is supported by the Gohda's long-standing allies the Azuma Ninja, while Motohide ends up manipulated by both a neighbouring lord and the rogue ninja group called the Burning Dawn led by Lady Kagami. The lead characters are three young ninja of the Azuma clan who trained together since childhood. They are Rikimaru, dedicated to his duty as a ninja; the rebellious and free-spirited Ayame; and Tatsumaru, the chosen successor to their mentor Azuma Shiunsai. The storyline is split across three campaigns following first Rikimaru and Ayame, and then Tatsumaru.

Motohide allies himself with the warlord Toda Yoshisada in order take control of the Gohda lands. Toda launched an attack against Gohda castle which resulted in the death of Lord Gohda's wife and the kidnapping of his daughter Kiku. Motohide is later killed by Toda, only to be killed in turn by Kagame, who founds the Burning Dawn to the goal of turning ninja into an acknowledged political force. Kiku is successfully rescued, forming a strong bond with Ayame. Over a period of time following Toda's death, the Burning Dawn partake in a series of underground criminal activities such as kidnapping, theft, forced labor, smuggling and murder. During one such conflict, Tatsumaru is apparently killed while fighting Kagame, but in fact suffered amnesia and was adopted by Kagame into the Burning Dawn under the title "Seiryu". Under this identity, Tatsumaru kills all the Azuma ninja aside from Rikimaru and Ayame, then kills Shiunsai who reveals he killed Tatsumaru's father before adopting him.

In a final campaign by Lord Godha against the Burning Dawn on their flagship Fire Demon, Rikimaru kills Suzaku and then mortally wounds Kagame. Tatsumaru slowly regains some of his memories, and when fighting Ayame kills himself with Rikimaru's sword as penance for his actions against the Azuma and Godha. Kagame dies embracing Tatsumaru, having fallen in love with him, as the Fire Demon is destroyed by Godha's forces. Rikimaru pledges himself to Lord Godha as the Azuma's new leader, and Ayame while depressed by Tatsumaru's death chooses to keep living for Kiku, who has come to see her as an older sister. In the post-credits scene of Tatsumaru's campaign, Suzaku is revived as Onikage, servant of the demonic Mei-Oh and a leading antagonist of the first Tenchu.

== Development ==
Tenchu: Stealth Assassins, developed by Japanese company Acquire, was released in 1998 and went on to sell one million units worldwide, prompting the creation of a second title. The original's director Takuma Endo had wanted to develop a potential sequel on the PlayStation 2, but unfamiliarity with the new technology and demands from Western publisher Activision led to a sequel being produced on the original PlayStation, which Endo regretted. The game's budget was ¥200 million, with a production team of thirty people. The success of the original Tenchu allowed Endo to hire more people to ease production. Endo returned as director. The producer was Masami Yamamoto of Sony Music Entertainment Japan, with Activision's Pat Dwyer acting as associate producer. The scenario was written by Mikasa Hiragi of Studio Angina. Character designs are attributed to both original artist Koshi Nakanishi, and Kiyoshi Arai. The lead programmer was Daisuke Hisamatsu. Nobuhiro Obata returned to design an expanded level editor mode. Production lasted eighteen months. During production of both Tenchu and Tenchu 2, mistrust and tension had built up between Acquire and Activision over requests for changes, making working together increasingly difficult.

The original game ended with Rikimaru presumed dead, so rather than face the problems resolving that issue, it was decided to make the game a prequel. This decision was reinforced by a lack of character development in the story of the first Tenchu. The mission structure and accompanying narrative links were redesigned, as the original had its story missions handed out "in a slightly capricious fashion" from the character Godha, with missions instead emerging from the narrative and building on each other. The setting of a civil war over the Godha lands allowed for greater gameplay variety including escort missions. As part of Activision's requests, more overtly Japanese elements were toned down to make the game more appealing to Western players. For his work on the character art, Arai gave them an earthenware texture. Noriyuki Asakura returned as composer. Compared to the style of the original, the music for Tenchu 2 was made more Japanese in tone at the request of the producers. As with the original, the opening theme used Hausa for the lyrics.

Hisamatsu remembered creating a new draw engine and incorporating new control options as the hardest part of his job. He had a lot of trouble with technical problems which persisted until the later part of production, mostly due to issues with getting the graphics to run smoothly. The enemy AI was upgraded to be more reactive, greater ability to hear sounds made by the player, and able to call reinforcements. The number of stealth kills were also increased. The swimming controls were redesigned, with Acquire coming up with five different versions before Activision settled on an option. The motion capture was recorded at a studio in Okinawa. The motion capture performer for the game was Tsutomu Kitagawa, who previously performed in and supervised motion capture for the first game. Real-time event scenes were handled by Ayako Takenaga, who called the project exhausting for her, and saying some scenes were planned and drafted but ultimately dropped from the final product. The CGI cutscenes were co-created by Technonet, Sasahara-Gumi and Trilogy.

== Release ==
Tenchu 2 was officially announced in May 1999 during that year's E3. Promotion of the title at E3 2000 was problematic, as it drew staff away from the American and European localizations, the latter requiring technical alterations by Acquire to match different frame rate displays for PAL televisions. Notable bugs that needed to be caught were a common freezing bug, and Rikimaru being able to clip through walls. It was published in North America by Activision on August 8, 2000. The European version saw substantial alterations, featuring less blood, no decapitations, and shurikens removed due to laws prohibiting their portrayal in the United Kingdom. It released in Europe by Activision on September 8.

The demand from Activision was for a sequel aimed at Western markets, with a Japanese release originally not being planned. To get it released in Japan, Acquire chose to self-publish the title. This version saw further improvements graphically and technically, in additions to expansions to the level editor with new objects for level creation. The game was released in Japan on November 30. A guidebook was published in Japan by Dengeki PlayStation on December 11.

== Reception ==
Reception

Aggregate score
Aggregator	Score
Metacritic	77/100

Review scores
Publication	Score
AllGame	4.5/5
Edge	6/10
GameFan	72%
GamePro	4/5
GameRevolution	B−
GameSpot	8.3/10
IGN	9.1/10
Next Generation	4/5
Maxim	6/10

During its North American month of release, the game was the sixth best-selling title during the period. According to a press release, it continued to sell well over the following months. It also reached the top ten best-selling multiplatform titles upon its release in the UK. According to Famitsu, the sequel sold over 101,000 units in Japan.

Tenchu 2: Birth of the Stealth Assassins received "generally favorable" reviews, according to review aggregator Metacritic.

Jim Preston reviewed the PlayStation version of the game for Next Generation, rating it four stars out of five, and stated that "Tenchu 2 doesn't surpass the original but does succeed in capturing its smooth gameplay and despite some minor weaknesses, the game is without a doubt exceedingly cool."

== Legacy ==
Following Tenchu 2, the series' licenser Sony Music Entertainment Japan underwent restructuring, resulting in Activision buying the Tenchu intellectual property in November 2000. This prevented Acquire from developing any more titles for the series, as Activision shifted production to another company. The development studio K2, newly-formed in 2000 by industry veteran Mitsuo Kodama, created the sequel Tenchu: Wrath of Heaven for release in 2003. Acquire's inability to work on Tenchu, but continued wish to develop titles using a feudal Japanese setting, resulted in them partnering with Spike to create Way of the Samurai.
