= They Don't Know I'm Too Young for the Adventurer's Guild =

Japanese light novel series

- First light novel volume cover

冒険者ギルドが十二歳からしか入れなかったので、サバよみました。 (Bōkensha Girudo ga Jūni-sai kara Shika Haire na Katta node, Saba Yomimashita)
- Genre: Adventure, fantasy
- Novel series
- Written by: KAME
- Published by: Shōsetsuka ni Narō
- Original run: March 12, 2021 – present
- Light novel
- Written by: KAME
- Illustrated by: ox
- Published by: Micro Magazine
- English publisher: NA: J-Novel Club
- Imprint: GC Novels
- Original run: January 30, 2023 – present
- Volumes: 3
- Manga
- Written by: KAME
- Illustrated by: GUNP
- Published by: Micro Magazine
- Imprint: Ride Comics
- Magazine: Comic Ride
- Original run: August 30, 2023 – July 30, 2025
- Volumes: 3

They Don't Know I'm Too Young for the Adventurer's Guild (冒険者ギルドが十二歳からしか入れなかったので、サバよみました。, Bōkensha Girudo ga Jūni-sai kara Shika Haire na Katta node, Saba Yomimashita) is a Japanese light novel series written by KAME and illustrated by ox. It began serialization on the user-generated novel publishing website Shōsetsuka ni Narō in March 2021. It was later acquired by Micro Magazine who began publishing the series under their GC Novels imprint in January 2023. A manga adaptation illustrated by GUNP was serialized in Micro Magazine's Comic Ride online magazine from August 2023 to July 2025.

== Media ==
=== Light novel ===
Written by KAME, They Don't Know I'm Too Young for the Adventurer's Guild began serialization on the user-generated novel publishing website Shōsetsuka ni Narō on March 12, 2021. It was later acquired by Micro Magazine who began publishing it with illustrations by ox under their GC Novels light novel imprint on January 30, 2023. Three volumes have been released as of April 30, 2024. The series is licensed in English by J-Novel Club.

No.	Original release date	Original ISBN	North American release date	North American ISBN
1	January 30, 2023	978-4-86716-390-0	March 10, 2025	978-1-71-830868-8
2	June 30, 2023	978-4-86716-442-6	June 17, 2025	978-1-71-830870-1
3	April 30, 2024	978-4-86716-567-6	—	—

=== Manga ===
A manga adaptation illustrated by GUNP was serialized in Micro Magazine's Comic Ride online magazine from August 30, 2023, to July 30, 2025. The manga's chapters were compiled into three tankōbon volumes released from April 26, 2024, to September 29, 2025.

No.	Release date	ISBN
1	April 26, 2024	978-4-86716-565-2
2	December 25, 2024	978-4-86716-687-1
3	September 29, 2025	978-4-86716-839-4

== Reception ==
The series won the 10th Internet Novel Award in 2022.

== See also ==
- Kusunoki's Garden of Gods, another light novel series with the same illustrator
