= Fireball (TV series) =

Series of CGI anime shorts

- Cover of the first DVD volume

ファイアボール (Faiabōru)
- Genre: Science fiction comedy
- Created by: Wataru Arakawa
- Anime television series
- Directed by: Wataru Arakawa
- Written by: Wataru Arakawa
- Music by: Yoshiyuki Usui
- Studio: Jinni's Animation Studios; Walt Disney Television International Japan
- Original run: April 7, 2008 – June 30, 2008
- Episodes: 13
- Anime television series

Fireball Charming
- Directed by: Wataru Arakawa
- Written by: Wataru Arakawa
- Music by: Yoshiyuki Usui
- Studio: Jinni's Animation Studios; Walt Disney Television International Japan
- Original network: Disney Channel, Tokyo MX
- Original run: April 4, 2011 – June 27, 2011
- Episodes: 13
- Anime television series

Fireball Humorous
- Written by: Wataru Arakawa
- Music by: Yoshiyuki Usui
- Studio: TMS Jinni's Inc.
- Original network: Dlife
- Original run: October 6, 2017 – December 8, 2017
- Episodes: 3
- Anime television series

Fireball Gebäude Bäude
- Written by: Wataru Arakawa
- Music by: Yoshiyuki Usui
- Studio: TMS Jinni's Inc.
- Original network: Disney Channel
- Original run: November 8, 2020 – December 10, 2020
- Episodes: 10

Fireball (ファイアボール, Faiabōru) is a series of CGI anime shorts produced by Jinni's Animation Studios and Walt Disney Television International Japan. The designer is Hitoshi Fukuchi. It is animated entirely in 3D with no cel-shading of any sort, as would be typical for the medium.

The show takes place in the distant future of the 49th millennium, and revolves around the happenings inside a giant manor inhabited by two robots; the gynoid duchess Drossel von Flügel (voiced by Miyuki Kawashō) and her massive cyclopean arachnoid servant, Gedächtnis (Tōru Ōkawa). The episodes are usually nonsensical in nature, normally showing the two characters making idle conversation in the midst of a war with humanity. A third character, a monkey-like robot named "Schadenfreude", joins them during the course of the series.

== Synopsis ==
The series' main characters, Gedächtnis and Drossel von Flügel, reside in a gigantic manor surrounded by a presumably robot-inhabited city, beyond which is a desert that humanity's forces slowly encroach across during the 144-year timeframe in which the series is set (identified onscreen as the "Merkur Era", 48,650–48,794).

Gedächtnis is Drossel's servant and guardian, having sworn to her late father to protect her. Drossel treats him very much after the manner of the "spoiled princess" stereotype. A running gag in the series is that, at the beginning, Gedächtnis waits for Drossel to arrive and is called by a name Drossel chooses seemingly at random (although some, such as Sancho Panza and Rasputin, infer an unambiguously subservient status upon him). Gedächtnis then attempts (in a gentle, butler-like fashion) to remind Drossel of his name, upon which she tells him not to interrupt her. Another recurring joke is Drossel claiming that she practices karate despite her moves obviously being capoeira.

Drossel was manufactured as having the mind of a 14-year-old girl, with Gedächtnis' being that of a 50-year-old man; neither's age is explicitly stated, although both are known to be at least 2,800 years old–Gedächtnis stated that he entered service with the von Flugel family 2,800 years ago, and that it has been his duty to remain by Drossel's side for all of that time. Both Gedächtnis and Drossel move and speak in markedly unconventional ways, for example: instantly replying to each other at inhumanly fast speeds; freezing in postures until a new one is assumed; replying in seemingly unrelated ways. They remark upon how illogical human speech seems to them and act in what could be said to be an unemotional manner, though they do show emotions at times.

The characters occasionally display knowledge of elements that would normally be considered on the other side of the fourth wall–Drossel makes reference to what happened "in the last episode", and at another time points out that she has heard something already in an anime; Gedächtnis stops a laughter track (and indeed, the episode) by punching the screen, causing it to fracture in the accustomed glass-splinter visual code and then to fall sideways to the floor.

The series sometimes makes serious points in otherwise complete nonsense–the city in which Tempest Tower is built (shown during the opening title sequence) appears to be stereotypically dystopian in appearance; in the episode "Butterfly", Gedächtnis discusses the nature of rules, and what it is to be 'real' in an almost philosophical fashion, and the last episode features some distinctive "last stand" elements (it is this episode in which Drossel recites her entire name and title and then walks to face the human forces just as the series ends).

== Crew ==
- Series Director: Wataru Arakawa (Walt Disney Animation (Japan), Inc. and Walt Disney Television International Japan)
- Series Composition: Hidemi Akao, Hitoshi Uehara, Mayumi Kawanishi and Nobumasa Hoshino
- Character Design: Hitoshi Fukuchi and Takayuki Yanase
- CG Director/Producer: Shigeyuki Watanabe (Walt Disney Animation (Japan), Inc. and Walt Disney Television International Japan), Hiroki Kawashima
- Guest Design: Asato Mifune (Walt Disney Animation (Japan), Inc. and Walt Disney Television International Japan) and Rie Tanaka
- Producers: Shogo Fukuwara, Nobumasa Hoshino (Jinni's Animation Studios), Hironori Motooka, Animation Production by Walt Disney Animation (Japan), Inc. and Walt Disney Television International Japan and co-produced by (Produced in association of Disney Channel Japan).

== Production ==
The anime series was created by Jinni's Animation Studios and animation production by Walt Disney Animation (Japan), Inc. and Walt Disney Television International Japan (conjunction of Walt Disney Animation Studios) and produced in association of Disney Channel.

=== Sequels ===
On August 10, 2010, it was announced on the official Fireball blog that the production for a second series had been green-lit, with director and writer Wataru Arakawa on board.

The sequel, titled Fireball Charming, was released in 2011 and is set chronologically before the events of Fireball (Fireball is set between the years 48650–48734; Charming begins in 48234, as shown on each episode's title cards). In all seasons save Fireball Humorous, either 8 or 16 years lapse between episodes.

Another sequel, Fireball Humorous, was released in 2017. There are no title cards showing the year, but a set of novelty glasses spelling out "40000" appear in episode 3, indicating that it most likely takes place later than that year.

The final chapter Fireball Gebäude Bäude was released in 2020; it is set between 39298 and 39362 in the "Cinnabar Calendar".

== Series overview ==
Season	Episodes	Originally aired	
Season	Episodes	First aired	Last aired
Fireball	13	April 7, 2008	June 30, 2008
Fireball Special	1	August 19, 2009	
Fireball Charming	13	April 4, 2011	June 27, 2011
Fireball Humorous	3	October 6, 2017	December 8, 2017
Fireball Gebäude Bäude	10	November 8, 2020	December 10, 2020

== Episodes list ==
=== Fireball ===
No.	Title	Original release date
1	"See the Aquatic Animals"; Transliteration: "Sono Suisei Dōbutsu o Miyo" (Japanese: その水生動物を見よ)	April 7, 2008
2	"9:25"	April 14, 2008
3	"The Day the Dolphin Flew"; Transliteration: "Iruka ga Tonda hi" (Japanese: イルカが飛んだ日)	April 21, 2008
4	"St. Elmo's Fire"; Transliteration: "Sento Erumo no Hi"	April 28, 2008
5	"Demon of the Frontal Lobe"; Transliteration: "Zentōyō no Akuma" (Japanese: 前頭葉の惡魔)	May 5, 2008
6	"An Unwavering Heart"; Transliteration: "Yuruginai Kokoro" (Japanese: ゆるぎないこころ)	May 12, 2008
7	"Prophecy"; Transliteration: "Purofeshī" (Japanese: プロフェシー)	May 19, 2008
8	"The Monkey in the Seat"; Transliteration: "Zamen no Saru" (Japanese: 座面の猿)	May 26, 2008
9	"Butterfly"; Transliteration: "Batafurai" (Japanese: バタフライ)	June 2, 2008
10	"Terminus"; Transliteration: "Shūchakueki" (Japanese: 終着駅)	June 9, 2008
11	"Intruders"; Transliteration: "Shinnyūsha-tachi" (Japanese: 侵入者たち)	June 16, 2008
12	"The Virtual Eye"; Transliteration: "Kyozō no Me" (Japanese: 虚像の眼)	June 23, 2008
13	"The Place Where Dreams Are Born"; Transliteration: "Yume no Umareru Basho" (Japanese: 夢の生まれる場所)	June 30, 2008

=== Fireball Special ===
No.	Title	Original release date
1	"Fireball Special - Making of Fireball"; Transliteration: "Faiabōru Supeshyaru - Meikingu obu Faiabōru" (Japanese: ファイアボールスペシャル メイキング・オブ・ファイアボール)	August 19, 2009

=== Fireball Charming ===
No.	Title	Original release date
1	"Bootstrap Continuum"; Transliteration: "Būtosutorappu Renzoku-tai" (Japanese: ブートストラップ連続体)	April 4, 2011
Drossel tells Gedächtnis of a dream where she encounters a human and considers using diplomacy to solve the robot-human conflict. At the end of the episode a human in gear resembling a space suit appears before them.
2	"Trojan Horse"; Transliteration: "Toroi ni Mokuba" (Japanese: トロイに木馬)	April 11, 2011
Gedächtnis gives Drossel lessons on grace and agility in preparation for an upcoming ball.
3	"Fixing the Klein Bottle"; Transliteration: "Kurain no Tsubo Naoshi" (Japanese: クラインの壷直し)	April 18, 2011
4	"Vacant Space"; Transliteration: "Utsurona Uchū" (Japanese: うつろな宇宙)	April 25, 2011
5	"Table of Champions"; Transliteration: "Chanpion-tachi no Shokutaku" (Japanese: チャンピオンたちの食卓)	May 2, 2011
6	"Brainstorming Session of Horror"; Transliteration: "Kyōfu no Zunō Kaigi" (Japanese: 恐怖の頭脳会議)	May 9, 2011
7	"Wuthering Heights"; Transliteration: "Arashigaoka" (Japanese: 嵐が丘)	May 16, 2011
8	"Gauntlet"; Transliteration: "Gantoretto" (Japanese: ガントレット)	May 23, 2011
9	"Rules of the Game"; Transliteration: "Gēmu no Kisoku" (Japanese: ゲームの規則)	May 30, 2011
10	"Waiting for the Last Year"; Transliteration: "Kyonen o Machinagara" (Japanese: 去年を待ちながら)	June 6, 2011
11	"Limbo"; Transliteration: "Rinbo" (Japanese: リンボ)	June 13, 2011
12	"Gravity"; Transliteration: "Jūryoku no Itoguruma" (Japanese: 重力の糸車)	June 20, 2011
13	"A World Without Love"; Transliteration: "Ai Naki Sekai" (Japanese: アイなき世界)	June 27, 2011

=== Fireball Humorous ===
No.	Title	Original release date
1	"The World to Come"; Transliteration: "Kitarubeki sekai" (Japanese: きたるべき世界)	October 6, 2017
2	"Heart of Gold"; Transliteration: "Kogane no kokoro" (Japanese: 黄金のこころ)	November 10, 2017
3	"The Hyperion Intersection"; Transliteration: "Haiperion kōten" (Japanese: ハイペリオン交点)	December 8, 2017
