= K2 (video game company) =

Japanese video game company

K2 Co., Ltd. is a Japanese company that plans and develops game software. It is a consolidated subsidiary of Capcom.

== History ==
K2 was founded in 2000 by Mitsuo Kodama and Masanori Kuwasashi, who had worked in game development for over 10 years at companies such as Irem, SNK, Psikyo, and Square Enix. Initially, it was a development studio of Activision and was involved in the development of the Tenchu series. After the rights to Tenchu were transferred to FromSoftware, K2 continued to work on the series as well as the 'Valhalla Knights series (published by Marvelous Entertainment), before becoming a Capcom group company in 2008. In the same year, Masanori Kuwasashi and others became independent and established Kurogane Co., Ltd. Its headquarters were located in Fujiidera City, Osaka Prefecture until it moved to Osaka City in 2009.

Since joining the Capcom Group, K2 has participated as a development partner in major Capcom titles such as the Resident Evil series, the Monster Hunter series, and the Ace Attorney series. K2 was responsible for the development of Lost Planet Colonies, an online expansion for Lost Planet Extreme Condition, released in 2008. Resident Evil Umbrella Corps, released in 2016, was a joint development with Capcom, with Capcom handling game design and K2 responsible for design data creation and programming. K2 also handled the ports of Resident Evil HD Remaster and the console version of Captive Palma.

== Company history ==
- August 2000 - Established in Fujiidera City, Osaka Prefecture.
- February 2008 - Reorganized from a limited company to a joint-stock company.
- May 2008 - Became a Capcom group company.
- July 2009 - Moved to Toyosaki, Kita-ku, Osaka City, Osaka Prefecture.
- March 2018 - Moved to Awajimachi, Chuo-ku, Osaka City, Osaka Prefecture.

== Main development projects ==
- 2003. Tenchu 3 PlayStation 2 Activision
- 2004. Tenchu 3 ~Kaiki no Sho~ Xbox Activision
- 2004. Tenchu Kurenai PlayStation 2 FromSoftware
- 2005. Tenchu Shinobi Taizen PlayStation Portable FromSoftware
- 2006. Tokimeki Memorial Girl's Side 2nd Kiss PlayStation 2 Konami Digital Entertainment
- 2006. Valhalla Knights PlayStation Portable Marvelous Entertainment
- 2006. Tenchu Senran Xbox 360 FromSoftware
- 2008. Samurai Shodown Sen Taito Type X2 SNK Playmore
- 2008. Valhalla Knights 2 PlayStation Portable Marvelous Entertainment
- 2008. Lost Planet Colonies Xbox 360 Capcom Lost Planet Extreme Condition online expansion
- 2012. Extroopers Nintendo 3DS, PlayStation 3 Capcom co-developed
- 2014. Resident Evil HD Remaster PlayStation 3, Xbox 360 Capcom port
- 2016. Resident Evil Umbrella Corps PlayStation 4, PC Capcom co-developed
- 2017. BIOHAZARD 7 resident evil "End of Zoe" PlayStation 4, Xbox One Capcom Expansion DLC for Resident Evil 7 Resident Evil. Co-developed
- 2019. Captive Palma Switch Capcom port
- 2020. Captive Palma Refrain Switch Capcom port
