= Shadow Assault: Tenchu =

2008 video game

- Developer: FromSoftware
- Publisher: FromSoftware
- Series: Tenchu
- Platform: Xbox 360
- Release: October 8, 2008
- Genres: Action, puzzle
- Modes: Single-player, multiplayer

Shadow Assault: Tenchu is a 2008 action game by FromSoftware for the Xbox 360. It is a part of the Tenchu series. Shadow Assault: Tenchu received mixed reviews from critics.

Shadow Assault is the only game in the series to be free of graphic violence, and was thus rated Everyone 10+ by the ESRB as a major departure from the more mature atmosphere of other games in the series.

== Gameplay ==
The game places the player in charge of one of several selectable characters from the Tenchu universe. Players are given a task to complete on each level, playing out much like Bomberman, where players must place ninja traps and other items on the field for enemies to run afoul of.

Enemies in the game have a hit point total, displayed above their heads, and a line of sight grid, shown as yellow squares over the regular terrain. When a player is spotted by a unit, its sight turns to red squares, and it begins to chase the player. After a time, if the player has yet to be reacquired by the enemy, it will return to its original pathfinding.

== Reception ==
Reception

Aggregate score
Aggregator	Score
Metacritic	46/100

Review scores
Publication	Score
1Up.com	C
GameSpot	5.5/10
IGN	4.7/10
Official Xbox Magazine (UK)	5/10
Official Xbox Magazine (US)	5/10

Shadow Assault: Tenchu received "mixed or average" reviews, according to review aggregator Metacritic.
