= Tenchu: Stealth Assassins =

1998 video game

- North American box art
- Developer: Acquire
- Publishers: JP: Sony Music Entertainment Japan; WW: Activision
- Director: Takuma Endo
- Producer: Masami Yamamoto
- Programmer: Daisuke Hisamatsu
- Artists: Koshi Nakanishi; Kensuke Yamamoto
- Writer: Takuma Endo
- Composer: Noriyuki Asakura
- Series: Tenchu
- Platform: PlayStation
- Release: JP: February 26, 1998; NA: September 14, 1998; EU: October 30, 1998
- Genre: Stealth
- Mode: Single-player

Tenchu: Stealth Assassins (Note: Japanese: 立体忍者活劇 天誅, Hepburn: Rittai Ninja Katsugeki Tenchū; lit. "Stereoscopic Ninja Theatrical Drama: Divine Retribution") is a 1998 stealth video game, developed by Acquire and published by Sony Music Entertainment Japan for the PlayStation. It is the first installment in the Tenchu series, with Activision releasing the game outside Japan. Following Rikimaru and Ayame of the Azuma ninja clan as they complete missions for their employer Lord Gohda in Sengoku-era Japan, the gameplay involves the player guiding their chosen character through missions. With the aim to being undetected while either avoiding or quietly killing enemies.

Production began in 1996 as Acquire's first project, with the aim being to create a then-uncommon game using only 3D graphics, in addition to focusing on stealth over action. The team faced multiple technical challenges, and director Takuma Endo ended up taking on multiple roles within the production including scenario writer. It met with positive reception from game journalists, with praise focusing on its mission design and focus on stealth. It was also a commercial success, selling over one million units worldwide by 2003, and having estimated sales of five million across all versions by 2019. A sequel without the involvement of rights owner SMEJ, Tenchu 2: Birth of the Stealth Assassins, was released worldwide in 2000.

== Gameplay ==
A mission in Tenchu; female protagonist Ayame hides from a guard's view.

Tenchu: Stealth Assassins is a stealth video game where players take on the role of either Rikimaru or Ayame, ninja who complete a set of eleven sandbox levels. While generally similar, Rikimaru has more health but is slower and has only one blade, while Ayame is weaker but uses two blades and has higher movement speed. Each mission starts off with a skippable briefing, then players can equip a limited number of items at an equipment screen. The items include health potions, trail markers, poisoned rice cakes, caltrops, shurikens (throwing blades in Europe), smoke bombs, grenades and land mines. The only permanent item taken into all missions is a grappling hook; when in use, the player enters a first person perspective, and the grapple can be fired at any solid surface to pull the player towards it. A map of the level is provided for players.

The selected character's health is shown in the bottom left, with the bottom right showing equipped or found items. Engaged enemies have health bars shown around the top left area of the screen. The goal is to complete levels with minimal detections and disturbances, with most levels ending in a boss encounter, and each having three level layouts which are randomly selected with each playthrough. During navigation, the player can traverse rooftops and walls, run or crouch into a sneaking position, hang from ledges, and hug nearby walls to remain undetected. Sneaking up on an enemy undetected allows for an instant kill, with close-range kills triggering cinematic death animations. If the selected character dies, the level must be restarted and all items aside from the grappling hook are lost.

To monitor surroundings, each protagonist has the Ki meter, indicating the distance and alert status of nearby enemies. A question mark indicates no alert, a single exclamation mark shows enemies are alerted but do not clearly see the character, an exclamation and question mark indicates a high alert state caused by sounds or a body discovery, while double exclamation mark is a full alert state where enemies will attack. A number beside the Ki display shows an enemy's distance. Each mission is ranked from the lowest "Thug" to the highest "Grand Master". Score is impacted by the number of undetected or detected kills, whether the character was spotted, and whether non-combatants were killed. Grand Master rank for each level unlocks a new special ability that can be equipped for replays.

== Synopsis ==
Tenchu is set in Japan's turbulent Sengoku period, and follows missions undertaken by the stoic ninja Rikimaru and spirited kunoichi Ayame of the Azuma ninja clan for their employer the benevolent Lord Gohda and his daughter Princess Kiku, who treats Ayame as an older sister. During several missions, the ninja are first accosted, then fought by the dark ninja Onikage, who is behind several of the disturbances with the goal of bringing his demonic master Lord Mei-Oh into the world. Onikage ultimately stages an attack on a town castle as a distraction so Kiku can be kidnapped and used as leverage against Lord Gohda. Onikage is defeated, but revives and attacks a final time as the ninja go to confront Lord Mei-Oh and rescue Kiku. Lord Mei-Oh is defeated in his cavern lair, which starts to collapse around them. Rikimaru sacrifices himself to allow Ayame and Kiku to escape.

== Development ==
The project was created by Takuma Endo, who had long wanted to produce video game titles and founded Acquire in 1994 with a group of friends. The PlayStation console was released that same year, and while Endo was eager to develop for it and approached Sony as an individual, he was turned down as Sony was only working with development studios. He was later turned down again after founding Acquire as Sony were unwilling to work with new developers. Acquire took part in a "Digital Entertainment Program" audition organized by Sony Music Entertainment Japan to find up-and-coming development studios. They successfully pitched to Sony, who agreed to support production for a PlayStation title. After a troubled six-month period of testing and planning, they had a prototype build. Production proper on the game began in 1996, though Endo was concerned due to the rarity of games which allowed for free exploration of a 3D space. The producer was Sony Music Entertainment Japan's Masami Yamamoto, the game being his debut as a producer. The lead programmer was Daisuke Hisamatsu. A Nintendo 64 version was considered, but Acquire ultimately decided to focus on one platform for the best quality.

The original pitch used a futuristic science fiction setting, with characters performed using motion capture and a ninja aesthetic set in a near-future New York City. During this early stage, the game drew inspiration from the movie adaptations of Judge Dredd and Batman. Acquire ultimately decided to abandon the futuristic setting in favour of feudal Japan. Endo explained the decision as being due to the team losing their vision for the game behind the science fiction setting. With the new direction, the team now drew inspiration from the movies of Japanese filmmaker Akira Kurosawa. Once the setting was decided, the game's title was chosen, as it was a regularly-used phrase in samurai movies meaning to attack one who does wrong. Japanese folklore also informed their depictions of the demonic enemies. The change in setting caused problems for the development team, and Endo ended up taking on multiple roles within the production alongside his role as director. He acted as planner, scenario writer, sound editor, and one of the game testers. There were no dedicated designers, with the production being a collaborative effort. The main artist and character designer was Koshi Nakanishi. The in-house artist team was led by Kensuke Yamamoto.

During development, there was a constant worry that the game would not sell, with emotional conflicts between staff members going on throughout. A male and female protagonist was present in the first pitch, and remained intact at the team's insistence during other production troubles. Endo cited the early 2D Metal Gear games as an influence, but the team wanted a fully 3D feel to stealth gameplay by adding the element of height and different camera angles. The 3D map and camera systems of 1996's Tomb Raider inspired the team as it was quite close to their initial design ideas. The game was a technical challenge due to the PlayStation's hardware limitations, as they needed to balance draw distance, a stable frame rate, and the gameplay requirement of seeing enemies. The nighttime setting was chosen as a suitable compromise, and enemies had to be carefully placed as clusters of them would cause the frame rate to drop. The Ki meter was included to play into the traditions surrounding ninja while giving players an alert system in the dark environments without resorting to a minimap. While Acquire could not match the budget and scope of Metal Gear Solid, which was in development at the time, they used it to spur themselves to making the game's setting and 3D environments as convincing as possible. The main motion capture actors were Sho Kosugi (Rikimaru), Naoko Kamio (Ayame), and Kane Kosugi (Onikage). Other in-game characters were performed by Tsutomu Kitagawa, Shigehiro Takeda and Yoshinari Hirose. Kitagawa supervised the motion capture process.

=== Music ===
The music was composed by Noriyuki Asakura, who would gain notoriety through his work on the Rurouni Kenshin anime adaptation and had worked with the PlayStation hardware on the soundtrack of Crime Crackers. He acted as both composer and arranger, and he used a combination of live and synthezised instruments. Asakura was contacted by Yamamoto during a long hunt for a composer, and Asakura was brought on board the project after sending in the opening theme "Addua", originally written for another project. Rather than limiting himself to the game's historical period, Asakura blended Japanese musical styles with Chinese, Thai and Turkish elements to create a new type of Asian music. The goal was to take this musical style and fuse it with Western rock and fusion to defy player expectations about the music.

The lyrics for "Addua" are Hausa, which was used as it sounded romantic and mysterious. Asakura originally intended to use English lyrics, then standard Japanese, but both were rejected as lacking compared to the game's atmosphere. The lyrics were written by Asakura's wife Sumie, who originally suggested using Hausa. Researching the language was challenging as Sumie Asakura only had access to language dictionaries rather than native speakers. Asakura provided the male vocals for the opening theme. The female vocals were performed by Yui Murase.

An official soundtrack album was released on April 22, 1998. Murase also performed on the track "Tenchu Suite - aminina", an album-exclusive composition with lyrics by Sumie. "Addua" and "animina" were released as singles on the same day as the album.

== Release ==
Tenchu released in Japan on February 26, 1998. Sony had no plans to release Tenchu outside Japan due to its stealthy depiction of ninjas clashing with the action-oriented Western portrayals, but American publisher Activision was impressed by the game and successfully pitched for the rights. The Western version was co-produced by Yamamoto and Larry Galka. Galka remembered Tenchu being seen as a big risk for Activision due to its gameplay innovations and setting. The Western version included two more levels "Cross the Checkpoint" and "Execute the Corrupt Minister", and alternating layouts for missions. In addition, there were technical improvements to polish the graphics and stabilize the frame rate. Asakura returned to compose tracks for the new levels. An early version of the new level "Cross the Checkpoint" has a female boss character looking like a young girl, which needed changing to make her more mature so it would pass Sony's approval criteria. A further addition was the level editor and cheat menu, which Hisamatsu remembered as a challenging addition as they needed to incorporate it onto the limited spare space on the game disc. Bug fixes carried on past the new year. In the United Kingdom, the game was censored to replace shurikens with throwing blades due to laws prohibiting kunai use and display. The game released in the West on September 14 in North America and on October 30 in Europe. The Western version was released in Japan on February 22, 1999 under the title Tenchu: Shinobi Gaisen, with cover art drawn by manga artist Hiroaki Samura and a new opening. This version released in the budget "The Best" series on November 11, 1999. A standalone expansion compiling one hundred user-created levels was released in Japan on that same date under the title Tenchu: Shinobi Hyakusen.

== Reception ==
Reception

Aggregate score
Aggregator	Score
Metacritic	87/100

Review scores
Publication	Score
Edge	7/10
Electronic Gaming Monthly	7.75/10
Famitsu	28/40
Game Informer	9/10
GameRevolution	A
GameSpot	8.3/10
Hyper	91%
IGN	9/10
Next Generation	4/5 (Import); 4/5
Play	77%
Dengeki PlayStation	90/100, 70/100, 75/100, 90/100

Tenchu: Stealth Assassins was very successful both in Japan and overseas; by 2003 it sold 250,000 units in Japan, and a total of over 1.4 million copies worldwide. It was Activision's highest-selling title for that year. It would be Acquire's best-selling title until the 2018 release of Octopath Traveler. Former Activision producer David Grijns estimated in 2019 that the game ultimately sold five million units across its original release and subsequent re-releases.

The game received "generally favorable" reviews, according to review aggregator Metacritic. It was ranked as the 54th-top game of all time by the staff of Game Informer in 2001: "Tenchu: Stealth Assassins showed the gaming world that it takes more than just dark clothes and pointy throwing objects to make it as a ninja. Forcing players to learn and utilize stealth techniques to not only excel, but merely survive, Tenchu is a challenging, nerve-wracking game that leaves you screaming in frustration, then crawling back for more."

Next Generation reviewed the game, rating it four stars out of five, and stated that "The complicated and involving nature of the various missions makes Tenchu a highly engrossing, one-player adventure—the sort of thing long nights are made of." Next Generation later reviewed the U.S. version, rating it four stars out of five, and stated that "Activision has made significant changes in the conversion, but it feels as if the developers have jury-rigged bug fixes and added filler material rather than improved the game."

The Academy of Interactive Arts & Sciences named Tenchu as a finalist for "Console Action Game of the Year" and "Console Game of the Year" during the 2nd Annual Interactive Achievement Awards, which were ultimately awarded to Banjo-Kazooie and The Legend of Zelda: Ocarina of Time, respectively.

== Legacy ==
Tenchu was one of a number of titles released in the late 1990s that codified the stealth game genre, alongside Thief: The Dark Project and Metal Gear Solid. The success of Tenchu helped establish Acquire as a company, though it would also limit their titles to a Japanese aesthetic for some time. Activision demanded a sequel for Western players, which Acquire developed under the title Tenchu 2: Birth of the Stealth Assassins. The title released in 2000, with Acquire acting as its Japanese publisher. Following Tenchu 2, Activision acquired the Tenchu IP and gave development of the next title Tenchu: Wrath of Heaven to K2. Acquire would not return to the series until 2008's Tenchu: Shadow Assassins.
