= Tenchu: Shadow Assassins =

2008 video game

- Developer: Acquire
- Publishers: JP: FromSoftware; WW: Ubisoft
- Director: Keisuke Kanayama
- Producer: Masanori Takeuchi
- Designer: Yasuhiro Abe
- Programmer: Nobuhiro Momiyama
- Artist: Yoshiyuki Okada
- Writer: Yasuhiro Abe
- Composer: Noriyuki Asakura
- Series: Tenchu
- Engine: Gamebryo
- Platforms: Wii; PlayStation Portable
- Release: Wii: JP: October 23, 2008; NA: February 5, 2009; PAL: March 12, 2009; PlayStation Portable: JP: February 12, 2009; NA: March 24, 2009; EU: April 3, 2009; AU: April 9, 2009
- Genres: Action-adventure; Stealth
- Mode: Single-player

Tenchu: Shadow Assassins (Note: Tenchu 4 (天誅 4, Tenchū Yon, lit. "Divine Retribution 4")) is a stealth game developed by Acquire and published by FromSoftware in Japan and Ubisoft worldwide for the Wii in 2008 and the PlayStation Portable in 2009.

== Gameplay ==
Shadow Assassins allows players to take control of both Rikimaru and Ayame. The camera is an over-the-shoulder point of view. All of the 10 missions are ground-based. There are no healthbars in this game except sword fight parts. Players will play the first five stages and the last one using Rikimaru and stages six to nine as Ayame. There are also 50 side missions called "Assignments".

Ayame is faster but weaker, making it harder for her to hide bodies. According to FromSoftware, their stages are also completely different; Rikimaru's are more straightforward, while Ayame's are "a little trickier, she can use the environment more." There are about 10 multi-purpose items in the game; for example, a cat can be used as distraction as well as a scout.

On Wii, players use the analog stick on the Wii Remote's Nunchuck accessory to move, A button for actions, holding B button while moving forward to run or while moving sideways to strafe, and the C button for jumping (a long jump can be performed while running). The Wii Remote is also used for first-person perspective sword fighting.

The gameplay of the PlayStation Portable version is generally the same. However, its controls have been altered to fit the handheld's functionality, thus removing the motion controls; however, some similar controls have been retained, such as moving the analog stick to move forward, and pressing the D-pad to choose between the player's items. The controls for doing a stealth kill has been slightly changed; the player now has to press the face buttons of the PSP console to trigger it and moving the analog stick.

== Plot ==
In the land of Lord Gohda, peace has not been fully restored and rumors of betrayal have been swirling around the lord and his subjects. As a result, Lord Gohda calls upon the Azuma Ninja, Rikimaru and Ayame, to investigate. Rikimaru soon discovers that someone is planning to start a war. Meanwhile, Counselor Sekiya, Lord Gohda's right-hand man, arranges for a fortune-teller to predict the future of Lord Gohda's kingdom. Unfortunately, the fortune-teller turns out to be an imposter and kidnaps Princess Kiku, Lord Gohda's daughter.

Ayame chases after her without hesitation, while Rikimaru goes on another mission for Lord Gohda instead: resume the investigation on the nuisances that have been troubling the land. He then discovers that Daimyō Tado is the one behind all this. Lord Gohda then decides to declare war on Tado and travels to his land with Rikimaru. After Rikimaru succeeds in taking Daimyō Tado's life, the woman who posed as the fortune-teller, a Kunoichi named Rinshi, appears and tries to kill Rikimaru, but fails thanks to the intervention of Tachibana Hyakubei, who was hired by Lord Gohda. After Lord Gohda's order, Rikimaru heads back to the castle. When he arrives however, he is attacked by the guards, who were ordered to consider him a traitor by Sekiya. Ayame had actually succeeded in rescuing the Princess Kiku, but had been attacked by someone who seemed to be Rikimaru, who was actually Rinshi in disguise. Ayame and Princess Kiku then flee the castle as the real Rikimaru arrives, and the two women head for a secret hideout suggested by Sekiya. The Princess then reveals to be Rinshi in disguise and wounds Ayame, but Rikimaru arrives just in time to save her and kills Rinshi.

Lord Gohda, noticing his castle in flames, realizes that it was all Sekiya's doing and orders Rikimaru to get back there and eliminate him. After he seemingly takes Sekiya's life and saves Princess Kiku, Sekiya rises again and reveals himself to be Onikage, who then challenges Rikimaru to a duel. Rikimaru ultimately gains the upper hand but Onikage uses the princess as a shield, forcing Rikimaru to drive his sword through her to get to Onikage and kill him. Ayame, who had followed Rikimaru, cries upon Princess Kiku's death. The extended ending (attained by collecting all of the map pieces in normal mode) shows Ayame speaking in Onikage's voice, suggesting his hatred survived in her since Rikimaru murdered her best friend.

=== Characters ===
- Rinshi - A mysterious kunoichi who disguised herself as a fortune-teller during the first attempt of kidnapping Princess Kiku. Sekiya was fooled by letting her inside the castle. Later on, she reveals that her motive is actually to avenge the deaths of her parents because of Lord Gohda. In the U.S. version, this character is the reason why the ESRB accounted the game with the Suggestive Themes descriptor.
- Sekiya - The trusted right-hand man of Lord Gohda. It is noticeable that he could also give orders to the Azuma Ninja even without the accordance of Lord Gohda. In Tenchu: Shadow Assassins, it is revealed that the Sekiya during those times was just an impostor and turned out to be Onikage. It is not revealed where the real Sekiya is.
- Tado - A vicious daimyō who wished to start a war with Lord Gohda. He later dies after Rikimaru poisons his sake (depending on the player).
- Onikage - A mysterious, demonic ninja who seems to have some sort of past connection with the Azuma Ninja.

== Reception ==
Reception

Aggregate score
| Aggregator | Score | |
| Aggregator | PSP | Wii |
|---|---|---|
| Metacritic | 68/100 | 70/100 |

Review scores
| Publication | Score | |
| Publication | PSP | Wii |
|---|---|---|
| 1Up.com | N/A | B− |
| Edge | N/A | 6/10 |
| Game Informer | N/A | 6.5/10 |
| GamePro | 4/5 | N/A |
| GameSpot | N/A | 5/10 |
| GameTrailers | N/A | 7.4/10 |
| GameZone | 7.5/10 | 8/10 |
| IGN | 7/10 | 8/10 |
| Nintendo Life | N/A | 8/10 |
| Nintendo Power | N/A | 7/10 |

Tenchu: Shadow Assassins received "mixed or average" reviews, according to review aggregator Metacritic.
