= Tenchu: Fatal Shadows =

2004 video game

- European PlayStation 2 box art
- Developers: K2 (Kei-Two); FromSoftware (PSP)
- Publishers: JP: FromSoftware; NA/EU: Sega
- Director: Mitsuo Kodama
- Producers: Masanori Takeuchi; Naotoshi Zin
- Writer: Tomoyuki Hosokawa
- Composer: Koichi Suenaga
- Series: Tenchu
- Platforms: PlayStation 2, PlayStation Portable
- Release: PlayStation 2: JP: July 22, 2004; NA: February 17, 2005; EU: May 6, 2005; PlayStation Portable: JP: January 28, 2010
- Genres: Action-adventure, stealth
- Mode: Single-player

Tenchu: Fatal Shadows (Note: Tenchu Kurenai (天誅 紅, Tenchū Kurenai, lit. "Divine Retribution: Crimson")) (published in Japan as "Tenchu Kurenai") is an action-adventure stealth video game developed by K2 and published by FromSoftware in Japan and Sega in North America and Europe for the PlayStation 2 in 2004. The PlayStation Portable version of the game, Tenchu Kurenai Portable, (Note: Tenchu Kurenai Portable (忍者活劇 天誅 紅 Portable, Ninja Katsugeki Tenchū Kurenai Portable, lit. "Ninja Theatrical Drama: Divine Retribution Crimson Portable")) was released in Japan in 2010.

== Gameplay ==
Much like Wrath of Heaven, the previous entry in the series, Fatal Shadows uses the same engine. The ability to drag the victims' dead bodies after a kill returns, a mechanic only previously seen in Tenchu 2 Birth of the Stealth Assassins and Tenchu Return From Darkness, the Xbox port of Wrath of Heaven. Instead of increasing Kanji points after a stealth kill, scrolls are gathered, and the number of required scrolls increases as the player progresses through the story. Double stealth kills are possible when two enemies are together, and each stealth kill has a name listed below as the animation plays out.

== Plot ==
In a time of feudal wars, Rikimaru and Ayame, two ninjas of the Azuma Ninja Clan, served Lord Gohda by returning his precious daughter, Princess Kiku, from the hands of Lord Mei-Oh. Unfortunately, Rikimaru was caught in a disastrous rockfall during his escape in an attempt to save Ayame and Princess Kiku and is still missing at this point in the story. After losing her clan member, Rikimaru, peace was maintained in Lord Gohda's lands. Several months after Rikimaru's disappearance, Ayame is tasked with patrolling Gohda's territory. One day in her travels, Ayame came across a decimated ninja village. She hoped to find survivors but arrived too late. An old shinobi she finds dies in her arms, whispering "Kuroya" with their final breaths. As she was about to leave, a young female ninja arrived and stood in her way. Her name was Rin, and she was devastated to see the village in ruins. Rin and Ayame briefly engage in combat, with Ayame emerging victorious. Ayame spares her and disappears. Since then, their fates become inextricably intertwined as the story progresses.

== Characters ==
=== Rin ===
Rin is a playable character, and she replaces Rikimaru as the story's protagonist. The last of the Hagakure, her village was burned, and the Kuroya killed her family.

Rin is a young girl trained in assassination and unarmed combat since childhood. She was born and raised in a small ninja village on the border of "Hagakure." After her village was destroyed, Rin sought to avenge the deaths of her loved ones, working as a hired assassin for "Lady Razor" Ogin. Upon encountering Ayame, the two briefly battle, although Rin soon realizes that the other kunoichi is not responsible for the destruction of her village. The pair then ally so that they may better achieve their agendas. Rin wields a sword called Natsume but prefers to fight in unarmed combat, much like Tesshu Fujioka and Tatsumaru. She seeks to avenge her slain kin.

=== Ayame ===
The second playable character and a longtime member of the Azuma Ninja Clan dedicated to Lord Gohda Matsunoshin and his family. She is particularly close to Lord Gohda's daughter, Princess Kiku.

=== Kuroya ===
The main antagonists are called the Kuroya, a group of rogue ninja led by Jyuzou:

- Jyuzou - He is the supreme leader of the Kuroya, and is responsible for the destruction of his hometown, Hagakure village. He was actually next in line to become the next leader of the Hagakure, but refused to live by the rules set before him. Jyuzou's weapon is a blade concealed within a parasol. He had been Rin's fiancé before he betrayed the Hagakure and has since been pursued by Rin, seeking revenge.
- Futaba - One of the Kuroya assassins and the younger sister of Hitoha. She is another ex-member of Rin's clan who betrayed her friends and family and proved loyal in service to Jyuzou. Futaba considered Rin her rival and hated her deeply. She wields a crossbow-type device that shoots knives from a distance while battling alongside her twin brother.
- Hitoha - Just like Rin, he is from the Hagakure village. Along with his twin sister, he followed Jyuzou and betrayed the rest of the village. Hitoha fights with a pyrotechnic gauntlet on his wrist which can eject streams of fire at his enemies, combining the use of such a device with his athletic prowess and mastery of ninja mysticism.
- Ranzou - An assassin for the Kuroya who delights himself in torturing people. He is a twisted individual who derives pleasure from the pain of women; at the moment when Ayame finds him, he is torturing Rin's master, Lady Ogin. There are many of the Kuroya who look down on preying upon the weak, but Ranzou takes pride in his work. Ranzou fights with two katana swords connected together on end.
- Shou - An effeminate, narcissistic assassin of the Kuroya who disguises himself as a musician. He joined the Kuroya around the same time as Shinogi and is Jyuzou's personal favorite of the Kuroya, armed with a shamisen (a Japanese three-stringed guitar) which hides a powerful gun within. Together with Ranzou both of them are a powerful team in the Kuroya.
- Shinogi - An assassin for the Kuroya, it is his life goal to kill one thousand people before he himself dies. He joined the Kuroya after meeting Jyuzou for he saw an opportunity to kill with abandon. He fights in a similar manner to Roronoa Zoro from One Piece, in that he uses three sword style.
- Toshinari Katsuragi - A samurai-turned bandit, Katsuragi is a member of the Iwazuke clan with price on his head.
- Kichigorou - A man who works as assassin for the Beniya, and also a Goda spy. His real name is Mimizuku, but only Ayame knows this. He also might kill Rin but luckily, Rin does not know the secret of the letter. He was Rin's partner.
- Nasu - A blind man who pretends to be a masseuse to get into the homes of women, where he uses his technique to immobilize them. He hides a sword within his walking stick. Nasu is an entirely different enemy sharing the same name as one in the previous title. His appearance and fighting style make him an homage to Zatoichi.
- Ogin - Also known as "Lady Razor," this woman serves as Rin's employer and as head of the Beniya assassins. Her name is infamous in the criminal underworld.
- Tatsukichi - A geisha in the village of Hagogake who is blindly in love with Jyuzou, who sends her to her death to fight Ayame as distraction so he can escape. She is the weakest boss in the game, attacking with a poisoned knife while cringing in fear, but willing to fight in the death of Jyuzou's name. When defeated, she asks Jyuzou to forgive her failure, but he refuses while impaling her on his sword, stating that he "hates needy women". The Kuroya are a dangerous group of rogue ninja and the main enemies in the story. Led by Jyuzou, they are a mix of former allies, assassins, and outcasts who turned away from loyalty and honor to follow their own path. Even though each member has their own reasons, they all stand with Jyuzou and are ready to do whatever it takes to reach their goals, making them a serious threat throughout the story.

== Tenchu Kurenai Portable ==
The PlayStation Portable version of the game, Tenchu Kurenai Portable, was released in Japan in 2010. The game has been optimized for the PSP's screen size, and featured tweaked graphics and a new character costumes.

== Reception ==
Reception

Aggregate score
Aggregator	Score
Metacritic	58/100

Review scores
Publication	Score
1Up.com	C
Edge	6/10
Electronic Gaming Monthly	5/10
Eurogamer	4/10
Famitsu	31/40
Game Informer	7/10
GamePro	3.5/5
GameRevolution	D
GameSpot	6.4/10
GameSpy	3/5
GameZone	6.3/10
IGN	6.5/10
Official U.S. PlayStation Magazine	2/5
Detroit Free Press	1/4
The Sydney Morning Herald	2/5

Tenchu: Fatal Shadows received "mixed or average" reviews, according to review aggregator Metacritic.
