= Tenchu: Wrath of Heaven =

2003 video game

- European box art
- Developers: K2 (Note: Xbox port programmed by Prosoft Corporation. PlayStation Portable port designed by Kurogane Co. Ltd, and programmed by Prosoft.); TKO Software (Mobile)
- Publishers: WW: Activision; JP: FromSoftware; Mobile: EU: Digital Bridges; NA: I-Play
- Director: Mitsuo Kodama
- Designers: Masanori Kuwasashi; Tomoyuki Hosokawa; Susumu Nakamoto
- Programmers: Shinichi Shimizu; Tadao Tada
- Artist: Koichi Iwasaki
- Composer: Noriyuki Asakura
- Series: Tenchu
- Platforms: PlayStation 2, Xbox, Mobile phone, PlayStation Portable
- Release: March 4, 2003: PlayStation 2; NA: March 4, 2003; EU/AU: March 7, 2003; JP: April 24, 2003; Xbox; NA: March 9, 2004; EU: March 19, 2004; AU: March 30, 2004; JP: May 27, 2004; Mobile; EU: February 23, 2005; NA: June 13, 2005; PlayStation Portable; JP: August 27, 2009
- Genres: Action-adventure, stealth
- Modes: Single-player, multiplayer

Tenchu: Wrath of Heaven (Note: Tenchu 3 (天誅 参, Tenchū San, lit. "Divine Retribution 3")) (published in Japan as "Tenchu 3") is an action-adventure stealth video game developed by K2 and published by Activision for the PlayStation 2 in 2003. FromSoftware published the game in Japan as Tenchu 3. It was later ported to the Xbox in 2004 under the title Tenchu: Return from Darkness (Note: Tenchu 3 (天誅 参 〜回帰ノ章〜, Tenchū San Kaikinoshō, lit. "Divine Retribution 3: Chapter of Regression")) and to the PlayStation Portable in 2009 by FromSoftware under the title Tenchu 3 Portable. (Note: Tenchu 3 Portable (忍者活劇 天誅 参 Portable, Ninja Katsugeki Tenchu San Portable, lit. "Ninja Theatrical Drama: Divine Retribution 3 Portable")) A mobile version featuring 2D side-scrolling action gameplay was developed by TKO Software and released in 2005.

== Plot ==
After Lord Mei-Oh was defeated in Tenchu: Stealth Assassins, Rikimaru was left in Lord Mei-Oh's fortress holding a giant boulder to provide an escape route for Ayame and Princess Kiku. He appears to be trapped and left for dead. Ayame stuck Rikimaru's sword, "Izayoi" (he is seen drawing this sword in the opening CG of Wrath of Heaven), in the snow as a monument for her fellow clan member, now considered dead. A year later, Rikimaru reports to Lord Gohda that he has survived this near-death experience; unbeknownst to them, the real Rikimaru is trapped in the 20th century, trying to find a way back to their time.

The game's plot plays differently depending on the character chosen but connects at specific points. The story revolves mainly around Rikimaru's return and the struggle for the Three Jewels, which are said to give power to those who possess them. These are the Jewels of Heaven, Earth, and Virtue. Tenrai, an evil wizard who wants to get his hands on them, commands a band of his men to take the Jewels from whoever possesses them. However, upon encountering Rikimaru, he seems interested in his power and attempts to convince him to join his men. Rikimaru refuses, and he and Ayame face each one of them. One of the men in Tenrai's arsenal is Onikage, who only serves him to pursue his plan of reviving Mei-Oh (his former master) and Tatsumaru (the former leader of the Azuma Ninja Clan whom Tenrai restored). Rikimaru and Ayame follow Tenrai into his fortress to stop him from destroying the world using the power gained from two of the Jewels. Peace will be returned to Gohda's land if he can be defeated.

== Characters ==
Player characters:

- Rikimaru (力丸) is a physically strong and powerful ninja. Despite being reported as "missing" following the events of Tenchu: Stealth Assassins, he later reveals and surprised Lord Gohda with his return although technically he is only a shadow of the real Rikimaru who traveled without their notice. While the real Rikimaru is still trying to find a way to return to his time, he is trapped in the 20th century. He uses the sword "Izayoi" as his weapon and uses it mainly in his stealth kills.
- Ayame (彩女) is an agile young kunoichi. She is the remaining Azuma Ninja in the care of Lord Gohda with Rikimaru's disappearance. She is tasked to search for Rikimaru's body following the events of Tenchu: Stealth Assassins. She later paired up with the real Rikimaru when she encountered Onikage in the Amagai Castle. She uses a pair of Kodachi as her weapon and kills enemies with acrobatic stealth moves.
- Tesshu Fujioka (鉄舟藤岡) is a new character introduced in Tenchu: Wrath of Heaven. A village doctor by day and a vigilante assassin by night; however, he is not a ninja and is not serving under Lord Gohda but instead, he serves in an underground organization of assassins known as Muzen that murders only if it serves justice and is led by Zennosuke. Tesshu uses brute force, and pure strength in battle and uses his fists as his weapons. His attacks resemble aggressive jujutsu techniques, utilizing crippling strikes, headbutts, and vicious bone-breaking twists. He also wields acupuncture needles in many of his stealth kills. Although he possesses acupuncture needles, he only uses them for killing enemies in stealth. Tesshu also has a brief moment of rivalry with Rikimaru, when they fight each other to a draw after Rikimaru "steals" Tesshu's kill (Nasu). In Tenchu: Fatal Shadows, Tesshu makes a brief cameo in a cutscene after Rin defeats Futaba and Hitoha. He is the only playable character in the series to have a known full-name. Tesshu's character design is heavily based upon the character "Baian Fujieda" originally created by historical novelist Shōtarō Ikenami in 1972 and played by Ken Watanabe in the Japanese TV drama Baian the Assassin from 1990–1992.

Other characters:

- Tenrai is a powerful evil sorcerer who is the main antagonist of the game. He set up fortress near Gohda's lands to make his plans easier to execute. He plans on gathering the Three Jewels with the aid of his "Lords of Darkness". Achieving two of the Jewels, he transforms into his stronger form while fighting Rikimaru or Ayame. Tenrai possesses a set of candles representing each of the other boss enemies throughout the game: as his candles snuff themselves out, he is aware of the movements of Rikimaru and Ayame. His Lords of Darkness, consists of people he summoned and some he revived:
- Dr. Kimaira, a mad scientist-inventor who is in charge of the mechanism of Amagai Castle, north of the Ronin village. He carries a giant Gatling gun-equipped puppet whom he calls "Mahime" (which literally translates to "Dancing Princess") which he invented for battle.
- Hyakubake, an impersonator who exactly copied Ayame in Rikimaru's story and vice versa. He was battled and killed when he slipped through his words while speaking to Rikimaru. He does not fight on his true appearance.
- Ganda, one of Tenrai's Lords of Darkness whom you encounter at the Great Buddha temple. He will be fought alone when playing as Ayame and Tesshu. But he is joined by Kagura when playing as Rikimaru.
- Kagura, a sorceress who never fights alone. When playing as Rikimaru, you encounter her together with Ganda and when playing as Ayame, you encounter her together with a Kitsune (spirit fox), most likely summoned. She also summons paper ghosts to disrupt Rikimaru and Ayame on their mission. Ganda's triple-backbreaker throw is identical to a move used by Clark Still of The King of Fighters games, and Kagura bears more than a passing resemblance to Chizuru Kagura, also of KOF.
- Onikage, a recurring villain from previous Tenchu games, recruited by Tenrai to retrieve Shichishito, the sword of Lord Mei-Oh. A mysterious shadow-ninja who faithfully serves Lord Mei-Oh, King of Hell and is one of the main antagonist in the game. He kills Echigoya Tokubei to get the Jewel of Earth and was also summoned by Tenrai to stop Rikimaru and Ayame from getting to his fortress. After facing Rikimaru again in the depths of Tenrai's fortress, he shows a side totally unlike himself, by addressing Lord Mei-Oh to forgive his failure, and proceeds to throw himself into a chasm, where he apparently explodes.
- Tatsumaru, the late leader of the Azuma Ninja clan who was an "elder brother" figure to Rikimaru. He was revived by Tenrai eight years after his demise because of his excellent skills. Though he was forced to battle Rikimaru and Ayame, he would eventually break out of Tenrai's mind control, sacrificing himself in order to help his former allies Rikimaru and Ayame stop Tenrai. Tatsumaru wields his sword with great skill and efficiency, but prefers to use methods of unarmed combat.
- Hamada, one of Lord Gohda's men. Under Tenrai's control, he became a traitor to Lord Gohda with the goal of stealing the Jewel of Virtue. Rikimaru carries out the kill without even having to fight, but Hamada puts up more of a fight when confronted by Ayame.
- Jinnai, a former member of the Muzen group, is actually the twin brothers, Sakyo and Ukyo, leaders of a particular organization against Tesshu's master, Zennosuke. Tesshu killed both of them in revenge of his boss whom he is so attached to.
- "Mr. D" CEO, a special boss who is only encountered in Rikimaru's special mission titled, "Through the Portal". An evil company-CEO who is trying to spread a disease and selling the 'only' medicine that can cure it in very expensive prices thus, gaining high profit. When Mei-Oh was defeated, Rikimaru followed him into the portal and ended up at this corporation that makes the disease in the present day period. He was later encountered by Rikimaru and was able to stop his evil plan. Rikimaru was then transported back into the 16th century.
- Nasu, an evil statesman who is very interested in buying innocent young women who are being kidnapped and sold by his trading partner Tokubei Echigoya. He has no affiliation at all with Tenrai. Nasu visited the renovated Echigoya Estate for a deal, only to be faced by the Azuma ninja and be killed.
- Tajima, a bodyguard working for Tokubei Echigoya who fights drunk with a katana and a three-barreled pistol. Aside from working for Echigoya, nothing else was learned from him because he dies on his first encounter with the Azuma.

== Development and release ==
=== Tenchu: Return from Darkness ===
Return from Darkness was developed over an eleven month period, with approximately three to four of those months spent on designing new stages, and the rest on porting the rest of the game while incorporating Xbox Live features. Tenchu: Return from Darkness was supported until the termination of Xbox Live in April 2010. The game is now playable online on the replacement online servers for the original Xbox called Insignia. Tench Design and direction was handled by the same team that worked on the original iteration of the game, while programming was done by Japan-based Prosoft Corporation.

Changes in the Xbox port included graphical improvements, two new multiplayer characters, two new single player missions, extra special moves, and the ability to go online with the versus and co-op multiplayer modes.

Three new characters were also added:

- Kanbe Tadokoro, one of Lord Gohda's vassals. He leads a rebellion against Lord Gohda and is killed by his daughter Mifuyu in order to preserve the honour of the Tadokoro clan.
- Mifuyu Tadokoro, daughter of Tadokoro Kanbe. She killed her father when she discovered that Tadokoro is planning a rebellion against Gohda.
- Yuge, a vassal of Tadokoro. Jinnai Sakyo convinced him to lead an attack on Gohda Castle.

=== Manga ===
A two-part prequel manga by Seishi Kishimoto was published in the April and May 2003 issues of Monthly Shōnen Gangan. The two chapters were titled Tenchu San, Zenpen (天誅 参（前編）; "Tenchu three, Part One") and Tenchu San, Kōhen (天誅 参 (後編); "Tenchu three, Part Two") respectively; the first chapter also included a color poster. The manga was never collected in tankōbon format, and thus is quite rare.

=== PSP version ===
In 2009, FromSoftware published a PlayStation Portable port of Tenchu 3. Designed by Kurogane Co. Ltd and programmed by Prosoft, this port included features from the Xbox port Tenchu: Return from Darkness with the exception of multiplayer.

== Reception ==
Reception

Aggregate score
Aggregator	Score	
Aggregator	PS2	Xbox
Metacritic	79/100	70/100

Review scores
Publication	Score	
Publication	PS2	Xbox
Edge	6/10	N/A
Electronic Gaming Monthly	7.17/10	6.67/10
Eurogamer	8/10	6/10
Game Informer	9/10	7.25/10
GamePro	3.5/5	3.5/5
GameRevolution	B−	N/A
GameSpot	8.3/10	7.3/10
GameSpy	4/5	3/5
GameZone	8.6/10	8.1/10
IGN	8.5/10	7/10
Official U.S. PlayStation Magazine	3/5	N/A
Official Xbox Magazine (US)	N/A	7.3/10
Maxim	10/10	N/A

Wrath of Heaven received "generally favorable" reviews, while Return from Darkness received "mixed or average" reviews, according to review aggregator Metacritic.

Ryan Boyce of Maxim gave Wrath of Heaven a perfect ten score, stating that, "If you're the kind of guy who likes to chop his prey into Sizzlean before he gets a whiff of your bad man musk, then the ninjas of Tenchu: Wrath of Heaven are right up your dojo." A 2015 retrospective by Eurogamer described Wrath of Heaven as the apex of the series, featuring "a tangible sense of purpose and poetry".
