= Tenchu Z =

2006 video game

- North American box art
- Developer: K2
- Publishers: JP: FromSoftware; WW: Microsoft Game Studios
- Director: Kiyoji Tomita
- Producer: Masanori Takeuchi
- Designer: Kiyoji Tomita
- Artists: Koichi Iwasaki; Hajime Ito
- Composers: Yoshikazu Takayama; Koichi Suenaga; Hideyuki Eto
- Series: Tenchu
- Platform: Xbox 360
- Release: JP: October 5, 2006; NA: June 12, 2007; AU: June 21, 2007; EU: June 29, 2007
- Genres: Action-adventure, stealth
- Modes: Single-player, multiplayer

Tenchu Z (Note: Tenchu Senran (天誅 千乱, Tenchū Senran, lit. "Divine Retribution: Disturbance")) (published in Japan as "Tenchu Senran") is an action-adventure stealth video game developed by Kei-Two and published by FromSoftware in Japan and Microsoft Game Studios worldwide for the Xbox 360 in 2006.

It is different from previous games in the series in that the player creates their own ninja characters, then builds up their skills as they play through the game rather than choosing from a small selection of pre-made characters, as they take orders from the series' previous main male character, Rikimaru. It also features four-player cooperative play through Xbox Live.

== Plot ==
The House of Gohda, where the Azuma Ninja Clan reside under the service of Lord Gohda, is on the brink of war with the neighboring country of Ogawara. As a new recruit in the Azuma Ninja Clan, the protagonist is sent to assassinate those who are assisting the country of Ogawara, including army generals and spies who have infiltrated the House of Gohda, as well as recover stolen items and rescue prisoners. In between thwarting the country of Ogawara's plans, the protagonist also receives missions in which he eliminates evil people such as abusive monks and greedy merchants.

The only returning characters are Rikimaru and Lord Gohda. There is a connection to previous games by having the corrupt Echigoya family play a part in the story.

== Gameplay ==
Tenchu Z is the largest game in the series to date, containing 50 missions with different difficulty settings and objectives. Characters also have different attributes (which are strength, agility, and health) which can be altered. Players use gold obtained by doing well in missions both in single player and multiplayer to purchase new aesthetic styles, abilities, items to use during missions, different special attacks to use in combat, in addition to combo-editing abilities.

Gameplay is relatively the same as the previous games in the series. The main difference is that, as mentioned above, players create their own character and unlock new skills, items and clothing for him as the game progresses. Only one fighting style is available: a Ninjato that can either be set with slower but more damaging attacks (the same as Rikimaru's in previous games) or faster and weaker attacks with different animations. The unlockable skills however are more varied, with most of them making their first appearance in the series while others return from previous games with some tweaks. Certain skills can be upgraded twice, enhancing the protagonist's abilities beyond those of the characters from previous games.

Enemies can hear footsteps if players run too close, and may hear them from a greater distance if they run on noisy surfaces such as puddles of water. They can also smell the protagonist if they fall into a cesspool (only found during some missions; after the protagonist emerges from the cesspool, a brown haze surrounds him, indicating that he can be detected by smell at a certain distance) or are covered with blood from an earlier fight. Lighting is also a factor, as the protagonist is less likely to be spotted while standing or crouching in a dark area.

== Reception ==
Reception

Aggregate score
Aggregator	Score
Metacritic	56/100

Review scores
Publication	Score
1Up.com	C+
Edge	6/10
Eurogamer	3/10
Game Informer	6.5/10
GamePro	3.5/5
GameRevolution	D
GameSpot	4.9/10
GameSpy	2.5/5
GameTrailers	5.9/10
GameZone	5.5/10
IGN	5.2/10
Official Xbox Magazine (US)	5/10
The A.V. Club	C

Tenchu Z received "mixed or average" reviews, according to review aggregator platform Metacritic.
