= Tenchu =

- Genres: Stealth, Action-adventure
- Developers: Acquire; K2; FromSoftware
- Publishers: Sony Music Entertainment Japan; Activision; Acquire; FromSoftware; Sega; Nintendo; Microsoft Game Studios; Ubisoft
- Creator: Takuma Endo
- Platforms: PlayStation; PlayStation 2 Xbox; PlayStation Portable; Nintendo DS; Xbox 360; Wii
- First release: Tenchu: Stealth Assassins; February 26, 1998
- Latest release: Tenchu: Shadow Assassins; February 2009

Tenchu (Note: Japanese: 天誅, Hepburn: Tenchū; lit. Divine Retribution) is a stealth action-adventure video game series owned by Japanese game publisher FromSoftware, where the player assumes the role of a ninja in 16th-century feudal Japan. The first game in the series titled Tenchu: Stealth Assassins was developed by Japanese developer Acquire and published in 1998. Later games have also been developed by K2 and FromSoftware. The current rightsholder to the series is FromSoftware who bought the rights from Activision in 2004.

The title in Japanese literally translates in English as "Divine Retribution", with 天 (ten) meaning heaven and 誅 (chū) meaning death penalty (another translation of this phrase, Wrath of Heaven, is the title of the first PlayStation 2 entry in the series).

== Gameplay ==
The game perspective is third-person. There are numerous items to help the ninja on his/her mission, but unlockable items can be acquired if the player gets a "Grand Master" rating at the end of the level by being as stealthy as possible. Items and controls vary from game to game, but the gameplay is essentially the same throughout except Tenchu: Shadow Assassins. Stealth is a very important element in the game, where players have to duck, crouch, and hide behind walls to avoid detection. Enemies can be killed with one maneuver by using Stealth Kills, and a player can avoid detection by using the Ki meter. The larger the number, the closer the player's position to an enemy. If a player is spotted, the Ki meter will turn red, the enemy will alert everyone in the area, and the player is forced to fight hand-to-hand or hide somewhere until the enemies give up their search and resume their patrol routes.

== Synopsis ==
=== Characters ===
The main characters of the Tenchu series are Rikimaru, Ayame, Tesshu and Rin. Rikimaru is a tall, white-haired shinobi with a single ninjatō named "Izayoi" and a scar over his right eye. He is physically stronger than Ayame and Rin, but relatively slower. Ayame is a kunoichi (female ninja) who wears black (sometimes dark purple) clothing, with long pants, a loose belt, arm armor that goes to halfway from the elbow and shoulder, and a ring that surrounds her neck, with her midriff exposed and carries a pair of kodachi. She is faster and can perform more combos than Rikimaru and Tesshu, but is weaker than them. Tesshu is a vigilante who wears blue doctor's clothes and fights bare-handed with acupuncture needles; he is strong like Rikimaru, but slower than Ayame and Rin. His appearance is heavily based on the character "Baian Fujieda". Rin is a young kunoichi who carries a large katana called Natsume. Despite wielding a sword, she prefers to use hand-to-hand combat, relying on fast combos like Ayame.

=== Plot ===
The series takes place in 16th-century feudal Japan. The original story (Stealth Assassins) revolves around two ninjas, Rikimaru and Ayame, who have both been members of the Azuma Ninja Clan since childhood. The two ninjas serve the benevolent Lord Gohda and work for him as his secret spies to root out corruption and gather intelligence in his province. However, the evil demonic sorcerer Lord Mei-Oh sought to destroy Lord Gohda, and using his demon warrior Onikage, wreaked havoc throughout Lord Gohda's province. Although Lord Mei-Oh was killed in the first game, Onikage appeared in all subsequent games (except Fatal Shadows and Tenchu Z) as the archenemy of the two ninja, especially Rikimaru. Another major character who shows up frequently is Princess Kiku, Lord Gohda's daughter who often needs to be saved.

== Development ==
Release timeline
1998	Tenchu: Stealth Assassins
1999
2000	Tenchu 2: Birth of the Stealth Assassins
2001–2002
2003	Tenchu: Wrath of Heaven
2004	Tenchu: Fatal Shadows
2005	Tenchu: Time of the Assassins
2006	Tenchu: Dark Secret
2006	Tenchu Z
2007
2008	Shadow Assault: Tenchu
2008	Tenchu: Shadow Assassins

Tenchu: Stealth Assassins (1998) and Tenchu 2: Birth of the Stealth Assassins (2000) were both developed by Acquire. Activision purchased the international publishing rights to the games from Sony Music Entertainment, who originally published the first game in Japan. The third game, Tenchu: Wrath of Heaven (2003) was developed by K2 and published by FromSoftware in Japan and Activision internationally. Activision sold the rights to the series, excluding the first two games, to FromSoftware in 2004, who then together with K2 developed six future games, released from 2004 to 2008, which were internationally distributed by various publishers.

There is an additional Japan-exclusive release for Tenchu: Stealth Assassins on the PlayStation. One hundred of the best competing levels designed with the level editor of Tenchu: Shinobi Gaisen (an expanded version of Tenchu re-released in Japan) were put together to form a stand-alone, non-story based expansion set called Tenchu: Shinobi Hyakusen. The engine and game fundamentals remained unchanged. Shinobi Hyakusen is famous for the hardest level settings among Tenchu fans, especially because of the tight time limits and the overall lack of the items, excluding the caltrops and the throwing stars. No North American or European versions were released however.

Several games were also ported to mobile phones with graphic changes. These include Tenchu: Ayame's Tale 3D which was released for the Sony Ericsson mobile phone series and Tenchu: Wrath of Heaven by TKO-Software and Digital Bridges which was released for mobile phones in 2005, although it used two-dimensional graphics. A Game Boy Advance version of the franchise was attempted by Classified Games in 2000, but it was scrapped due to the publisher's problems.

The video game Sekiro: Shadows Die Twice, developed by FromSoftware and published by Activision in 2019 was initially conceived as a new Tenchu game.

== Related media ==
A stage play adaptation Tenchu Butai was performed in 2014. DotA and its sequel Dota 2 include a playable character named "Riki, the Stealth Assassin".

== Reception ==
=== Critical reception ===
Aggregate review scores
Game	Metacritic
Tenchu: Stealth Assassins	(PS1) 87
Tenchu 2: Birth of the Stealth Assassins	(PS1) 77
Tenchu: Wrath of Heaven	(PS2) 79 (Xbox) 70
Tenchu: Fatal Shadows	(PS2) 58
Tenchu: Time of the Assassins	(PSP) 51% (Note: GameRankings score)
Tenchu: Dark Secret	(NDS) 37
Tenchu Z	(X360) 56
Shadow Assault: Tenchu	(X360) 46
Tenchu: Shadow Assassins	(Wii) 70 (PSP) 68

=== Sales ===
It's estimated that the whole series sales are at 10 million games sold worldwide as of 2018.

== See also ==
- List of ninja video games
- Shinobido: Way of the Ninja – a 2006 PS2 game with similar gameplay and stealth/action principals, also developed by Acquire.
