= List of gacha games =

Gacha games are video games that implement the gashapon mechanic. Gashapon is a type of a Japanese vending machine in which people insert a coin to acquire a random toy capsule. In gacha games, players pay virtual currency (bought with real money or acquired in-game) to acquire random game characters or pieces of equipment of varying rarity and usefulness. This is a variant of the loot box mechanic where players spend currency to acquire an entire set of random game items.

Gacha games are typically mobile games made in China, Japan, South Korea, or other Asian countries. They are typically free-to-play games which can be played using only the currency or characters received for free through gameplay and grinding. They are financed through the sale of virtual currency to the players who want to spend real money to progress faster or be better at competing with others. So-called "whale" players may spend significant amounts on gacha games, leading to concerns about gambling addiction.

This list is limited to notable gacha games with an article of their own and which have been released in an English-language version.

Overview of gacha games
Name	Genre	English language availability	Notes or short description	Ref.
A3!	Life simulation	2018–2021		
Action Taimanin	Action role-playing	2020	Hack and slash game based on the Taimanin visual novel series.	
Alchemy Stars	Tactical role-playing	2021–2025		
Animal Crossing: Pocket Camp	Social simulation	2017–2024	Animal Crossing mobile game	
Another Eden	Tactical role-playing	2019		
Arknights	Tower defense	2020	Noted for its soundtrack featuring high-profile musicians.	
Arknights: Endfield	Action-adventure Factory simulation	2026		
Artery Gear: Fusion	Turn-based strategy	2021-2024		
Azur Lane	Shoot 'em up	2019	Anthropomorphizes historic warships as young girls.	
BanG Dream! Girls Band Party!	Rhythm	2018	Part of the BanG Dream! music franchise.	
Bleach: Brave Souls	Beat 'em up	2016	Part of the Bleach media franchise based on Tite Kubo's manga.	
Blue Archive	Eastern role-playing	2021		
Blue Protocol: Star Resonance	MMORPG	2025	Part of the Blue Protocol franchise.	
Brave Frontier	Eastern role-playing	2013–2022		
Chaos Zero Nightmare	Turn-based strategy	2025		
Cookie Run Kingdom	City-building Role-playing	2021	Part of the Devsisters Cookie Run franchise.	
D4DJ Groovy Mix	Rhythm	2021	Part of the D4DJ music media franchise.	
DanMachi: Memoria Freese	Eastern role-playing	2017–2024	Part of the Is It Wrong to Try to Pick Up Girls in a Dungeon? Light novel franchise.	
Destiny: Rising	First-person shooter	2025	Part of the Destiny video game series by Bungie, but developed under license by NetEase	
Disney Twisted-Wonderland	Adventure Rhythm	2022	Part of a collaboration between Aniplex and Walt Disney Japan.	
Dragalia Lost	Action role-playing	2018–2022	First Nintendo IP released only on mobile platforms.	
Dragon Ball Z: Dokkan Battle	Board Puzzle	2015	Part of the Dragon Ball media franchise.	
Dragon Collection	Card battle	2012	The first popular Japanese gacha game, released 2010 on GREE.	
Duet Night Abyss	Open-world action role-playing	2025		
Eggy Party	Battle royale Platform Party	2023		
Ensemble Stars!! Music	Rhythm	2022	Spin-off to the Ensemble Girls! (2012)	
Epic Seven	Eastern role-playing	2018		
Fate/Grand Order	Tactical role-playing	2017	Part of the Fate/stay night visual novel franchise.	
Final Fantasy: All the Bravest	Eastern role-playing	2013–2023	Part of the Final Fantasy franchise. Widely criticized for its lack of gameplay, after one producer said that it was actually “not a game”.	
Final Fantasy Brave Exvius	Tactical role-playing	2016–2025	Part of the Final Fantasy franchise. Not to be confused with its spin-off War of the Visions: Final Fantasy Brave Exvius.	
Final Fantasy VII: Ever Crisis	Eastern role-playing	2023	Part of the Final Fantasy franchise.	
Fire Emblem Heroes	Tactical role-playing	2017	Spin-off of the Fire Emblem series.	
Gakuen Idolmaster	Raising simulation	2024	Spin-off of the Idolmaster series.	
Genshin Impact	Open-world Action role-playing	2020		
Girls' Frontline	Turn-based strategy	2018	Anthropomorphizes firearms as young girls.	
Girls' Frontline 2: Exilium	Turn-based tactics	2024	Sequel game to Girls' Frontline (2018).	
Girls' Frontline: Neural Cloud	Real-time strategy	2022	Spin-off and prequel game to Girls' Frontline (2018).	
Goddess of Victory: Nikke	Third-person shooter Role-playing	2022		
Granblue Fantasy	Eastern role-playing	2016	Browser game with music by Nobuo Uematsu (Final Fantasy). Generated various spin-offs.	
Heaven Burns Red	Eastern role-playing	2024		
Hatsune Miku: Colorful Stage!	Rhythm	2020	Part of the Hatsune Miku: Project DIVA franchise.	
Hololive Dreams	Rhythm	2026		
Honkai Impact 3rd	Hack and slash	2018		
Honkai: Star Rail	Eastern role-playing	2023	Spin-off to Honkai Impact 3rd (2018)	
Identity V	Multiplayer Survival horror	2018		
Infinity Nikki	Open-world Dress-up Action-adventure	2024	Sequel game to Shining Nikki (2019).	
Kingdom Hearts χ	Tactical role-playing	2016–2024	Part of the Kingdom Hearts series. Released on mobile devices as Kingdom Hearts Unchained χ. The "χ" character is a lower-case Greek chi.	
KonoSuba: Fantastic Days	Eastern role-playing	2021–2025	Part of the KonoSuba light novel franchise.	
Langrisser Mobile	Tactical role-playing	2019	Part of the Langrisser franchise.	
Limbus Company	Dungeon Role-playing	2023	Sequel to Library of Ruina (2021).	
Love and Deepspace	Otome	2024		
Love Live! School Idol Festival	Rhythm	2014–2023	Part of the Love Live! franchise. Has a 2020 spin-off: Love Live! School Idol Festival All Stars.	
Magia Exedra	Turn-based role-playing	2025	Spin-off of the anime series Puella Magi Madoka Magica, follow-up to Magia Record.	
Magia Record	Tactical role-playing	2019-2020	Spin-off of the anime series Puella Magi Madoka Magica.	
Mario Kart Tour	Kart racing	2019	14th game in the Mario Kart franchise. Unusually for a gacha game, a subscription was needed for many features. The gacha elements were removed in a 2022 update.	
Mobius Final Fantasy	MMORPG	2016–2020	Part of the Final Fantasy franchise.	
Monster Strike	Physics	2014	Became the basis of a special media franchise in Japan, including an anime series and several films.	
Naruto Shippuden: Ultimate Ninja Blazing	Action role-playing	2016–2021	Spin-off of the Naruto: Ultimate Ninja fighting game series.	
Neverness to Everness	Action role-playing	2026		
Nier Reincarnation	Eastern role-playing	2021–2024	Part of the Nier franchise.	
Ni no Kuni: Cross Worlds	Eastern role-playing	2021	Part of the Ni no Kuni franchise.	
Onmyōji	Eastern role-playing	2016	Part of the Onmyōji novel franchise.	
Octopath Traveler: Champions of the Continent	Role-playing game	2021	Part of the Octopath Traveler franchise.	
One Piece Bounty Rush	Beat 'em up	2018	Based on the One Piece franchise. Re-released in 2019.	
One Piece Treasure Cruise	Tactical role-playing	2015	Based on the One Piece franchise.	
Path To Nowhere	Tactical role-playing	2022		
Persona 5: The Phantom X	Role-playing Social simulation	2025	Part of the Persona franchise.	
IDOLA: Phantasy Star Saga	Turn-based role-playing	2020-2022	Part of the Phantasy Star franchise.	
Pokémon Masters EX	Pokémon	2019	Originally named Pokémon Masters. Based on the Pokémon franchise.	
Princess Connect! Re:Dive	Eastern role-playing	2021-2023	Sequel game to Princess Connect! (2015–2016). Also received a two-season anime adaptation.	
Punishing: Gray Raven	Hack and slash	2021		
Puzzle & Dragons	Tile-matching	2012	Received spin-offs including Puzzle & Dragons X and Puzzle & Dragons Z + Super Mario Bros. Edition.	
Raid: Shadow Legends	Auto-battler	2019	Infamous for its pervasive advertising on social media and aggressive monetization.	
Reverse: 1999	Tactical role-playing	2023		
Schoolgirl Strikers 2/Twinkle Melodies	Visual novel Role-playing	2014–2017–2018	Part of the Schoolgirl Strikers media franchise.	
SD Gundam Capsule Fighter Online	MMOTPS	2011		
Seven Knights	Eastern role-playing	2014–2023		
Seven Knights 2	MMORPG	2020	Sequel game to Seven Knights (2014).	
Shin Megami Tensei: Liberation Dx2	Eastern role-playing	2018	Part of the Megami Tensei franchise.	
Shoujo Kageki Revue Starlight -Re LIVE-	Rhythm	2018-2024	Part of the Revue Starlight media franchise.	
SINoALICE	Eastern role-playing	2020–2024	Directed by Yoko Taro (Drakengard).	
Solo Leveling: ARISE	Action role-playing Hack and slash	2024	Game adaptation to the Manhwa Solo Leveling.	
Sonic Runners	Endless runner	2015		
Stella Sora	Light-action adventure	2025	Yostar's first fully developed in-house game.	
Sword Art Online: Integral Factor	MMORPG	2017	Based on Sword Art Online Light Novel franchise.	
Tears of Themis	Adventure Visual novel	2020		
The Battle Cats	Tower defense	2012		
The King of Fighters All Star	Beat 'em up	2019-2024		
The Seven Deadly Sins: Grand Cross	Eastern role-playing	2019	Part of The Seven Deadly Sins franchise.	
Tokyo 7th Sisters	Rhythm	2014–2026		
Tokyo Afterschool Summoners	Card battle	2018	One of the first commercial Japanese LGBT video games, with art by prominent bara artists. Partially translated into English.	
Touhou LostWord	Turn-based strategy	2021	Based on the Touhou Project bullet hell franchise.	
Touken Ranbu: Online	Card battle	2021–2023		
Tower of Fantasy	Open-world Action role-playing	2021	Noted for its similarity to Genshin Impact.	
The Alchemist Code	Tactical role-playing	2017–2023		
Trickcal: Chibi Go	Auto battler	2025		
Uma Musume: Pretty Derby	Roguelike Sports video game	2025		
Uta no Prince-sama Shining Live	Rhythm	2018–2022	Part of the Uta no Prince-sama franchise.	
War of the Visions: Final Fantasy Brave Exvius	Tactical role-playing	2020—2025	Spin-off of Final Fantasy Brave Exvius.	
Warhammer Quest: Silver Tower	Tactical role-playing	2020	Part of the Warhammer Fantasy franchise.	
White Cat Project	Action role-playing	2015–2016	Released internationally under the name Colopl Rune Story; also received a one-season anime adaptation from 2020.	
Wikigacha	Collectible card game	2026	Online browser game	
Wuthering Waves	Open-world Action role-playing	2024		
Zenless Zone Zero	Action role-playing Hack and slash	2024		
