= Final Fantasy Brave Exvius =

2015 mobile game

Final Fantasy: Brave Exvius
- Developer: Alim
- Publisher: Square Enix
- Director: Eiji Takahashi
- Producers: Kei Hirono; Hiroki Fujimoto
- Writers: Yukinori Kitajima; Nanako Saito
- Composer: Noriyasu Agematsu
- Series: Final Fantasy
- Platforms: iOS, Android
- Release: JP: October 22, 2015; WW: June 30, 2016
- Genre: Role-playing
- Mode: Single-player

Final Fantasy Brave Exvius was a free-to-play role-playing video game developed by Alim and published by Square Enix for iOS and Android. Serving as a spin-off of the Final Fantasy series, the game was the first collaborative effort between Square Enix and Alim. Since August 2019, the app had been downloaded over 40 million times worldwide. A tactical RPG spin-off video game, War of the Visions: Final Fantasy Brave Exvius, was released in Japan on November 14, 2019, and globally on March 25, 2020.

It was shut down outside of Japan on October 30, 2024, and in Japan on October 31, 2025. An enhanced remake that adapts the first arc of Brave Exvius, titled Final Fantasy Resonance, was released on the Nintendo Switch 2, Nintendo Switch, PlayStation 5, Xbox Series X/S, and Windows on October 22, 2026.

== Gameplay ==
Brave Exvius was designed as a turn-based role-playing game, combining elements from the Final Fantasy series with those of previous Alim game, Brave Frontier. Similar to Brave Frontier, the battle system consists of a simplified interface where players can command their characters to attack by touching the character's corresponding attack button, and special attacks or items can be used by swiping the button and choosing the desired command. The game also used elements from the Final Fantasy franchise, such as magic spells, character-specific limit breaks, and the summoning of creatures (known as 'Espers').

Characters were presented in a pixel art style. As part of the game's gacha system, players summoned characters from past Final Fantasy and Brave Frontier titles. The rarity of summoning has ranged from 1 to 5 stars, with five-star summons (only inside the base) to be upgraded between 6 and 7 stars. Players then used those characters to build custom parties of the five units. They also recruited an additional 6th unit from other players. Through collaboration events, players had also been able to summon characters from other Square Enix titles such as Tomb Raider, Kingdom Hearts and Secret of Mana as well as multiple forms of Ariana Grande and Katy Perry. Players advanced through a series of stages until they encountered and defeated the final boss, during which they gained experience points, crafting materials and money.

The game also featured 'exploration' stages (a new addition compared to Brave Frontier), during which players were able to freely explore towns and other areas in a classic RPG style via touch controls, interacting with characters, visiting shops, obtaining quests, looking for resources and fighting enemies in random encounters (during which, the interface remained the same as regular battle stages). Hidden objects from exploration areas was the character known as the 'Fat Chocobo', who sold rare, exclusive items in exchange for a specific resource, known as 'Star Quartz'.

An arena mode was also available; allowed players to compete against the teams of other players. The game also featured various limited-time story events, where-by new stages and exploration areas are available for a limited duration.

Energy was a resource which players required to begin most stages. It re-charged themselves from real-time, even when the game was closed, or in the context of ‘sleep-mode’. New players began the game with a maximum energy level of 10, but gained more capacity as they completed stages and increase their 'player rank'.

=== World ===
The main way to access the story and lore of Brave Exvius is via the world map. In the world map, there are multiple continents, which correspond with the game's story arcs. To play, or continue with the story, the player must complete each continent to unlock a new continent. New continents are added to the game with periodic releases, as the story is expanded.

Within each continent, there is a path of towns and landmarks, and within the landmarks there are multiple levels, each with their own objectives.

=== Elements ===
In the game, there are 8 elements: fire, ice, water, lightning, earth, wind, light, and dark. Each element counters another; for example, ice is weak against fire, but effective against wind, whereas wind would be effective against earth.

Elements are important because most in-game enemies have specific elemental weaknesses (e.g. most monsters in the colder region of the world are weak to fire, mechanical enemies are often weak to lightning).

=== Espers ===
A key gameplay mechanic carried over from other Final Fantasy titles is that of 'Espers' (also known by other names, such as 'Summons' in other Final Fantasy games). Espers are powerful creatures that can be found in the game's world and, once defeated in battle, equipped to the player's units. Equipping an Esper will grant units new statistics and abilities to use in battle, and also allows that Esper to be evoked directly during combat.

As with other units, Espers can be increased in level to gain improved attributes and new abilities.

=== Chaining ===
Chaining the timing of attacks between characters in a party to do multiple hits in succession is a method for increasing damage dealt during battle. Most units will "chain cap", or max out, at 4 times normal damage, though some units can go up to 6. There are three types of chains in the game and they can be mixed together.

- A normal chain is made only by simple attacks and takes 31 individual hits to max out.
- An elemental chain happens when attacks of the same element(s) are used in succession. A single element chain will take 11 hits to max out.
- A spark chain is made of hits occurring simultaneously, the first hit is part of a normal chain, with any subsequent hits gaining the largest chain bonus. Non-elemental 2 unit spark chains take 13 hits to max out.

== Story ==
The story starts on Lapis, a world where Magic Crystals exist alongside Visions, which are physical manifestations of people's thoughts and feelings.

The story focuses on Rain, a young knight from the Kingdom of Grandshelt who, though a stalwart knight in his own right, feels overshadowed by his father, Sir Raegan. Rain and his childhood friend Lasswell are traveling on their airship when they encounter Fina, a young woman trapped in a crystal who begs assistance from them. Fina leads them to the Earth Shrine, where the Earth Crystal is under attack by the Veritas of the Dark, who claims to be one of the Sworn Six of Paladia. While the Dark Lord's real motive remains unknown, it seems that he wants to end the world by destroying all crystals. Though Rain and Lasswell have never heard of either Veritas or his organization, he proves to be a formidable foe, destroying the Earth Crystal despite their opposition.

With the help of Fina, a healer and archer who has lost her memory, the two set out to track down Veritas and stop his rampage.

== Development ==
Brave Exvius was first revealed in November 2014 at the Final Fantasy Live Event in Tokyo, alongside Final Fantasy Legends: Toki no Suishō and the Final Fantasy Portal App. It was first released in Japan in October 2015. Eiji Takahashi and Hisatoshi Hayakashi of Brave Frontier both directed and produced the game while Noriyasu Agematsu composed the game's musical score. Illustrations of the characters are handled by Yoshitaka Amano, who illustrated art on early Final Fantasy works. Before the game's release in Japan, a beta test began in August for the Android version of the game for a limited number of players who had registered accounts on the Square Enix Japanese website. An English global release was announced in 2016, with the beta version being released in Sweden, alongside the pre-registration campaign. The game was officially released worldwide outside of Japan on June 30 the same year.

A mobile companion app, Final Fantasy Brave Exvius: Digital Ultimania, was released in June 2019.

== Reception ==
Reception

Aggregate score
Aggregator	Score
Metacritic	73/100

Review score
Publication	Score
TouchArcade	3.5/5

Final Fantasy Brave Exvius received "mixed or average" reviews from critics, according to review aggregator Metacritic. TouchArcade awarded it a score of 3.5 out of five: "It's worth a shot if you're a fan of Square's classic RPG series, but in trying to stretch out to two different camps, I fear it may not entirely please either". In January 2016, the game has been downloaded 5 million times. A couple of years later, in October 2020, Final Fantasy Brave Exvius reached 45 million downloads across the Apple App Store, Google Play and Amazon App Store.

Mobile titles like Exvius helped Square Enix achieve profitability in 2015, in conjunction with other mobile titles it created. According to revenue estimates from analyst firm Sensor Tower, Final Fantasy Brave Exvius had a monthly revenue of $13 million in April 2018, with the Japanese version grossing $3 million on the App Store and $4 million on Google Play, and the English version grossing $2 million on the App Store and $4 million on Google Play.

== Remake ==
Final Fantasy Resonance, an enhanced offline remake, was announced in the June 2026 Nintendo Direct.
