= Raid: Shadow Legends =

2018 video game

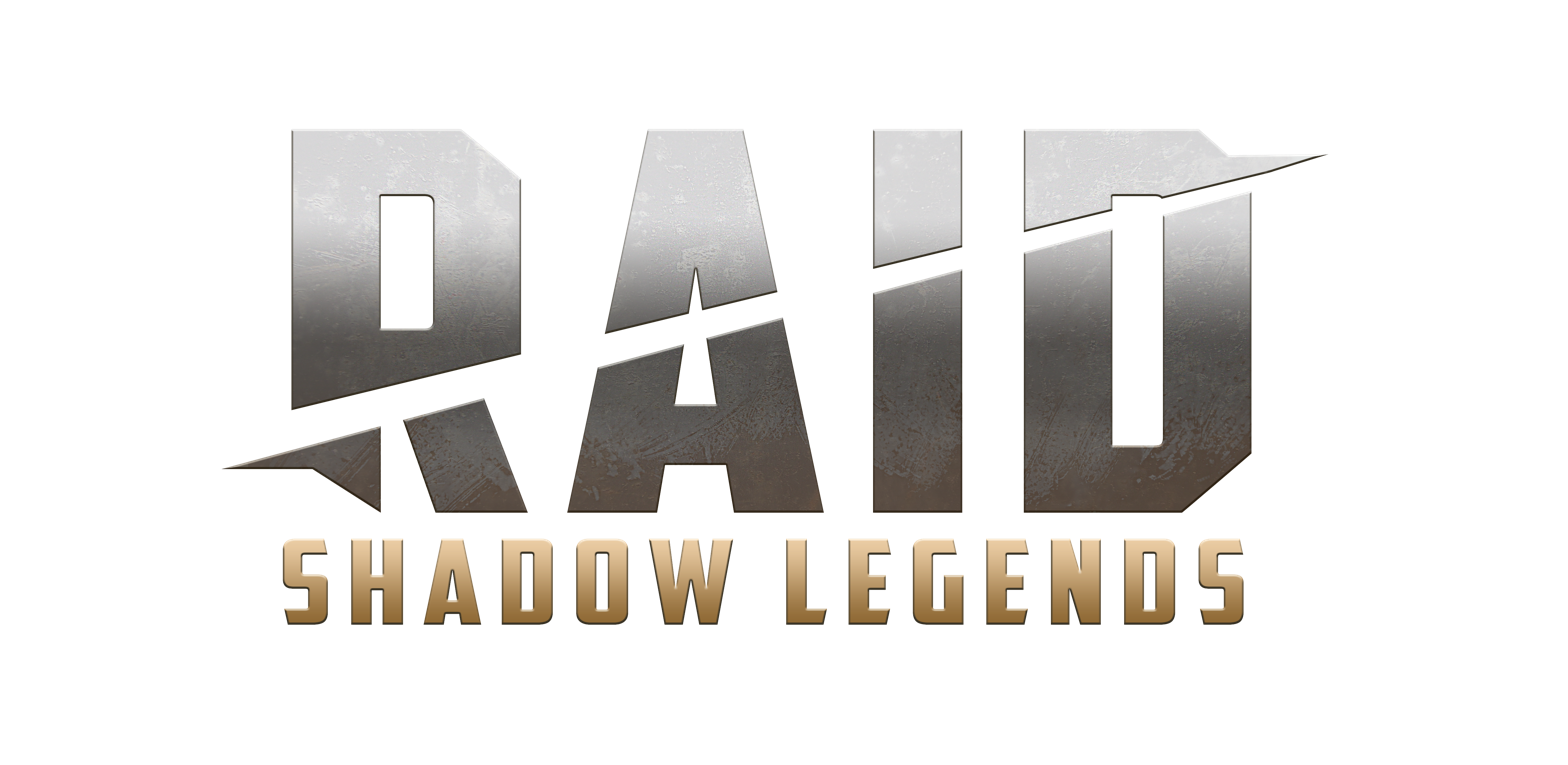
- Developer: Plarium Games
- Publisher: Plarium Games
- Writer: Paul C. R. Monk
- Composer: Paul C. R. Monk
- Engine: Unity
- Platforms: Android, iOS, iPadOS, Microsoft Windows, MacOS
- Release: July 4, 2018; 8 years ago
- Genre: Turn-based role-playing gacha game

Raid: Shadow Legends is a mobile role-playing video game developed and published by the Israeli game developer Plarium Games. A port to PC was released on January 21, 2020.

== Gameplay ==
Screenshot of gameplay

Raid: Shadow Legends is a fantasy-themed, turn-based role-playing gacha game. The game's story takes place in the fictional realm of Teleria, which has been subjugated by the Dark Lord Siroth. Players take the role of an ancient Telerian warrior resurrected by the Arbiter to defeat the Dark Lord Siroth and restore peace and harmony to Teleria. Players must assemble an army for battles in settings such as castles, dungeons, deserts, and temples defended by enemies and possible allies. Throughout the game, players accumulate Shards, vessels containing the souls of past warriors called Champions. Shards come in five types with different properties. These are Mystery Shards, Ancient Shards, Void Shards, Primal Shards and Sacred Shards. Raid has 6 types of rarities of champions. These are Common, Uncommon, Rare, Epic, Legendary and Mythical with the former being weaker and the latter much stronger. The game has two forms of currency: Silver, which is relatively easy to come by, and Gems, which are a lot more difficult to acquire. There is also a cost in Energy for running any of the campaign and dungeon stages. Without Energy, progress in the campaign is slow. It runs out quickly, and after the first day players will have to be very careful not to waste it.

The game consists primarily of story-driven single-player campaign with twelve levels, each level made up of seven stages with four levels of difficulty. The single-player campaign is interconnected with a multiplayer component, the Arena, to decide player rankings. Players can also join Clans, through which members fight a Clan Boss together, which brings advanced rewards. They can also take part in a Siege Mode which is a clan vs clan mode.

The game's narrative was written by Paul C. R. Monk. The game adopts a Western art style, and the settings inspired by dark fantasy.

== Reception ==
While Raid: Shadow Legends has been praised for its graphics, it has also been criticized for its aggressive monetization in the form of microtransactions. Pocket Gamer commended the "sheer graphic quality", for its "beautifully rendered and animated" characters and a "generous experience for new players". TheGamer heavily criticized Raid, citing its lack of depth and freemium structure, describing it as "the epitome of pay to win". Gamezebo praised the game for trading "the typical anime-style visuals for a more realistic, dark fantasy look", going on to write about "the truly stunning experience, with some of the finest attack animations and environmental effects we've seen in the genre so far." However, the article also criticizes the game's underlying monetization, pointing out that progress is difficult, "particularly if you don't plan on spending any actual money on the various upgrades". In its review, BlueStacks also praised the visuals, saying, "The animations are simply spectacular, with the quality the likes you seldom see in these games," and concluding that "players that enjoy fantasy combat with a more realistic approach—similar to The Lord of the Rings—will likely have a very good time with Raid: Shadow Legends." South African technology website htxt.africa praised the graphics, but overall found it boring with too many microtransactions.

=== Sponsorships and advertising ===
The game has received substantial attention for its aggressive advertising campaign, most notably on its amount of sponsorships given to a huge number of YouTube and Twitch content-creators as well as celebrities such as Ronda Rousey and Akshaj Singh, leading to it becoming an Internet meme.

In February 2020, two tweets were posted by a Plarium customer support agent on Raid's Twitter feed, claiming that Raid does not sponsor but rather "cooperates" with YouTube and Vimeo creators, gaining online attention for potential violations of FTC-rules requiring payments for endorsements to be disclosed to the public. Various creators contradicted this tweet, openly stating that they were sponsored by Raid or have received offers from Plarium involving Raid-related sponsorship-deals. Plarium later posted a tweet clarifying that its earlier tweets were referring to tutorials and Raid-focused videos, not its marketing campaign.
