= Guardian Tales =

2020 action-adventure puzzle video game

- Initial promotional cover
- Developer: Kong Studios
- Publishers: iOS, Android; WW: Kakao Games; CHN: Bilibili; JPN: Kong Studios (2021-present), Yostar (2021-2023); Nintendo Switch; WW: Kong Studios
- Engine: Unity
- Platforms: iOS; Android; Nintendo Switch
- Release: iOS, Android; SEA: 24 February 2020; WW: 28 July 2020; PRC: 27 April 2021; JP: 6 October 2021; Nintendo Switch; WW: 4 October 2022
- Genre: Action role-playing game
- Modes: Single-player, multiplayer

Guardian Tales is a 2020 action role-playing video game developed by Kong Studios and published by the South Korean publisher Kakao Games. The game initially soft-launched in parts of Southeast Asia on February 24, 2020 for iOS and Android and then officially on July 28, 2020, for the rest of the world. A Chinese version published by Bilibili was released on April 27, 2021, and a Japanese version self-published by Kong Studios, in collaboration with Yostar, was released on October 6, 2021. A port for the Nintendo Switch was initially announced in May 2021 and scheduled for release on the later half of the same year, but was quietly delayed to October 4, 2022.

The game tells the story of the Guardian Knight, a newly recruited member of the Guardians, Kanterbury Kingdom's royal guard. After completing their first training as a Guardian, the Guardian Knight is confronted with a horde of enemies named "The Invaders" who want to rule the world. Guardian Tales was positively received by critics and players, praised for its creativity and evocations of classic JRPGs.

== Gameplay ==
Players control the Guardian Knight (or another 'hero' in the next level if desired) in a top-down view. The game features joystick controls on the bottom right and left of the screen. Players have to fight enemies on the current floor, if they want to go to the next area in the level, using all tactics and running to lure the enemy to the desired area, but the player will be 'locked' in an area if the battle is not over. Players will also be able to unlock new heroes throughout the game, as well as acquire new weapons by opening a box or finding a hidden location. The player initially camped in a forest for rest and treatment after completing a stage, but after completing Chapter 1, the player landed in Heavenhold, an airfield operated by Innkeeper Loraine at their residence. Players can also Summon a Hero by using the Gems for each attempt. Players can also join a Guild with other players, which will open a Raid mode that targets 4 bosses, each with a drop of useful items, experience points, or gold.

After unlocking Heavenhold, players are also featured with other game modes such as Colosseum and Multiplayer, which includes Arena and Co-op. In Colosseum mode, players will risk 4 Heroes to fight 4 Hero opponents, the match takes place automatically but players can rearrange their position before the fight. While in Arena, players will control only one Hero from three and will compete with Hero opponents online, if the Hero loses, the player will be replaced with the second and third Hero until the last Hero loses. In the Kama-Zone mode, players perform the same as in the Colosseum, but will go up level by level to the boss level. Co-op mode was added during Lunar New Year in 2021, featuring 4-player dungeon rush levels.

== Plot ==
The Guardian Knight is a knight of Kanterbury who has just joined the Guardians of Kanterbury Kingdom. Guardians who had just finished training with other members were informed that they had been attacked. Led by Captain Eva, the Knight and others rushed to the front gate of the castle in defense against the Invader's attack. But as they fend off the Invaders' attack, a giant fireball falls on them causing the Guardian Knight to be thrown away but is rescued by a mysterious stranger. With the front gate of the palace broken, a horde of Invaders came and attacked the capital of the Kingdom. The Guardian manages to fight the Invader frontline, rescuing his friends Bob and Linda as well as reuniting with Captain Eva. After a minor scuffle with a Minotaur, the Knight and Eva manage to defeat it and return to the Palace to meet with the Princess and Queen Camilla. With Camilla finished evacuating the people to a safe place, the main antagonist (only referred to as the "Dark Magician" in the prologue) appears and knocks out the three outlying the Princess. With her survival, she managed to freeze the Magician in place. The four of them then started to leave but were attacked again by the escaped Dark Magician. While escaping, the antagonist manages to strike Eva and Camilla before the Knight and the Princess fall into the outskirts of Kanterbury's forests. The adventure begins with their quest to escape while finding a way to free Kanterbury from the clutches of the Invaders.

== Development and release ==
Guardian Tales was developed by Kong Studios, the creator of Dungeon Link (2015). It was released on 16 July 2020 for iOS and Android. A port for the Nintendo Switch was published on 21 September 2022.

In March 2026, Kong Studios went through a restructuring, laying off most of its staff including the Guardian Tales developers. It stated the decision was made due to the recent revenue loss, and that it would continue supporting the game.

== Reception ==
Zach Guida of Hardcore Droid said "The game works very well in combining JRPG characters, humor, and story elements with the dungeon game". Catherine Ng Dellosa of Pocket Gamer thinks "Overall, Guardian Tales needs your full attention, and it's not something you can play every time you need to take a break.", giving this game 4.5 out of 5 stars overall.

The game also noted as the driving factor for Kakao's revenue increase, citing that the COVID-19 pandemic makes the online services becoming more prevalent. Guardian Tales had over 3 million of players globally during November 2020.
