= Wikipedia – The Text Adventure =

2017 video game

Wikipedia: The Text Adventure
- Developer: Kevan Davis
- Publisher: Kevan Davis
- Platform: Web
- Release: 2017
- Genre: Interactive fiction
- Mode: Single-player

Wikipedia: The Text Adventure is an indie interactive fiction browser game developed by the London-based Kevan Davis. It was released in 2017, and pulls data from Wikipedia to automatically generate a playable video game. It received praise for its unique idea and retro appearance, but was also criticized for the coldness of its auto-generated content.

== Gameplay ==
The game is based on 1980s Infocom interactive fiction titles, with similar graphics and interface, including making article pictures into "staticky pixel art".

== Development ==
The game was originally inspired by a previous 2015 project, Around the World in X Wikipedia Articles, in which the developer programmed software to write a novel by pulling information about locations from Wikipedia articles. In creating the game, he realized that the compiler would quickly be overloaded if it tried to auto-generate a standalone adventure all at once, so he made the game generate itself as the player progressed through different choices.

Davis stated that the purpose of the game was about "players setting their own challenges, defining their own paths".

== Reception ==
Sam Machkovech of Ars Technica called the game "a clever way to interpret the gushing fountain of data that is Wikipedia's API". Stephanie Chan of GamesBeat called it "cold and alien" when she first played and saw descriptions of the places, but said that she later realized that one could further interact with locations, such as examining things and talking to people. She stated that she thought the game's point was to show that it took an effort to make sense of any place while traveling.

Tom Sykes of PC Gamer called it a "fun new browser game", noting that the images look "convincingly 8-bit-ish".

== See also ==
- Wikigacha
