= Blue Protocol: Star Resonance =

2025 cross-platform MMORPG

- Developer: Shanghai Bokura Network Technology
- Publisher: A Plus Japan
- Series: Blue Protocol
- Platforms: Microsoft Windows, iOS, Android
- Release: October 9, 2025
- Genre: Massively multiplayer online role-playing

Blue Protocol: Star Resonance is a free-to-play massively multiplayer online role-playing game (MMORPG) developed by Shanghai Bokura Network Technology and published by A Plus Japan. A follow-up title to Bandai Namco's Blue Protocol MMO (2023–2025), it launched worldwide on 9 October 2025 for Microsoft Windows and mobile devices.

== Gameplay ==
Star Resonance is an action-combat MMORPG based on traditional party roles (DPS, tank, healer) and open-world exploration. It provides for real-time dodging and combo-driven fights alongside gathering and social systems such as trading and guilds.

The game uses a free-to-play model with microtransactions, purchased with numerous in-game currencies available in "bound" (earned in-game) and "unbound" (purchased) forms. It includes gacha mechanics for cosmetic items (costumes, mounts), convenience items that speed up progress, and items that provide combat abilities.

== Development ==
Blue Protocol: Star Resonance was developed by Shanghai Bokura Network Technology and published by A-Plus Japan. A revival of the discontinued 2023 game Blue Protocol, it was announced at Tokyo Game Show 2025. It was produced by Chen Min.

The game was announced for a Western release in 2025 after the shutdown of Bandai Namco's 2023 MMO video game Blue Protocol. Bokura's project, initially a mobile-only entry in the same universe, was expanded into a distinct cross-platform MMO, Blue Protocol: Star Resonance.

Star Resonance was released worldwide on October 9th, 2025, as a cross-platform release for PC via Steam and the Epic Games Store, Android, and iOS devices.
