= Stella Sora =

- Developer: Yostar
- Publisher: Yostar
- Engine: Unity
- Platforms: Android; iOS; Windows
- Release: October 20, 2025
- Genre: Action RPG
- Mode: Single-player

Stella Sora (Japanese: ステラソラ, Chinese: 星塔旅人) is a free-to-play action role-playing game with gacha game mechanics, developed by Yostar released on 20 October 2025.

== Gameplay ==
Stella Sora is an isometric-view roguelike action game with real time combat. Player character known as "Tyrant" builds a party of three characters referred to as "Trekkers", with one character being the main controlled character and two additional characters serving as support. Combat features automatic basic attacks, skills and dodges. Gameplay involves progressing through randomly generated levels and strengthening characters. Once the run is concluded the resulting party can be saved as record and can alter be used in other game modes.

== Development ==
In August 2024, Yostar announced recruitment for a new development team to create a new mobile project. On December 18th, Stella Sora was officially announced with pre-registration being opened at the same time. A number of trailers were released, including a gameplay trailer and a concept trailer.
