= Wikigacha =

2026 video game

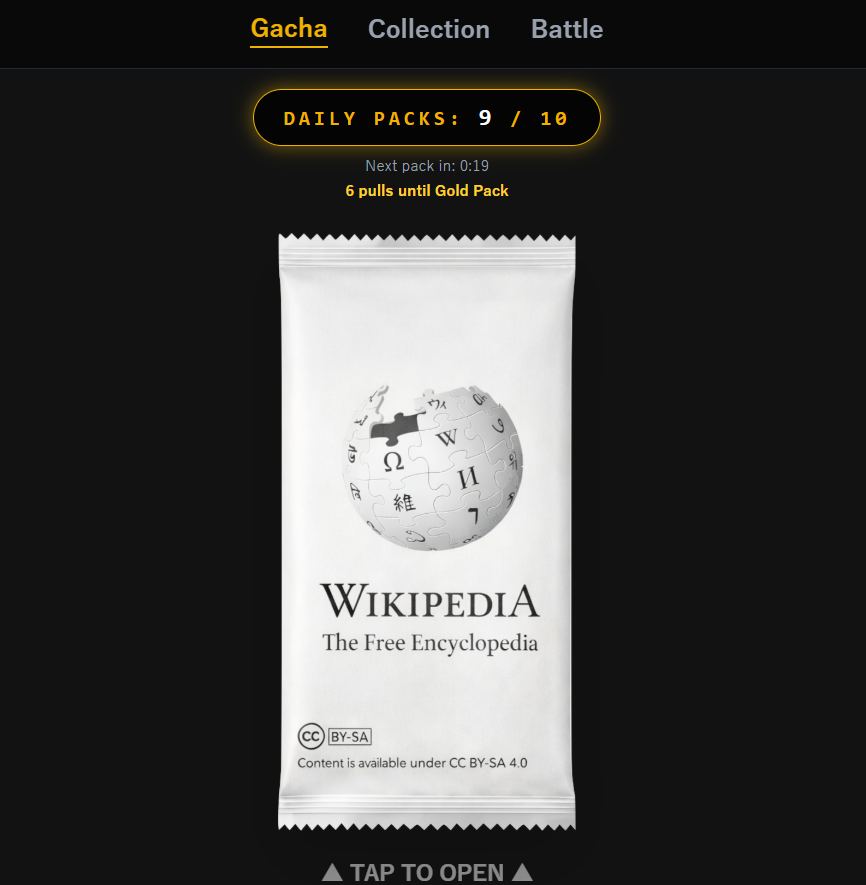
- A screenshot of a main page of Wikigacha
- Developer: Harusugi
- Platform: Web browser
- Release: February 24, 2026
- Genre: Gacha game

Wikigacha, also known as Wikipedia Gacha, is an online gacha trading card game by the Japanese developer Harusugi. It allows players to collect trading cards adapted from articles on Wikipedia, and use them in battle. The game was received positively by players and critics, who highlighted the combination of card collecting with Wikipedia's variety of articles.

== Gameplay ==
Wikigacha is an online gacha trading card game. The player is able to open packs that grant them multiple cards. Each card is based on an article from an edition of Wikipedia corresponding to the language the game is played in, such as English Wikipedia or Japanese Wikipedia. Each card has an attack (ATK), defense (DEF), and rarity values, which are determined by that article's Wikipedia statistics. Rarity is determined by the article's quality assessment ranking, attack is based on how many pageviews the article receives multiplied by its rarity, and defense is based on how long the article is. Rarer cards are given flavor text; the text is not from Wikipedia and is generated by a large language model. For every 10 packs the player opens, they are given a special gold pack which guarantees them cards with higher rarities. Clicking a card also redirects the player to the associated article.

The player is also able to compete in battles, either against random opponents or a daily "Raid Battle" against a specific rare card; once completed, the player will be given a "raid coin" marked with the first letter of the Wikipedia article they defeated. Against other players, they can either do a one-card battle, or assemble a deck of five. Raid Battles are fought with a 10-card deck.

== Release and reception ==
Wikigacha is developed by Japanese developer Harusugi, released on February 24, 2026. Shortly after release, the game went viral in Japan, with players showcasing their card collections of articles they felt were random or amusing; the influx of players resulted in temporary server issues. A "Story Mode" for the game will be added at a later date.

Jamie Hore of PCGamesN called Wikigacha his favorite game of 2026, highlighting its addictive nature and the absurdity of certain Wikipedia articles as contributing to its enjoyment. He said that no other game released in 2026 had been able to "make [him] laugh like this". However, he felt that the game could have used more "sophisticated" visuals and battle systems. Anthony McGlynn of GamesRadar+ likened it to Wikipedia's "random article" button, calling it a timesink that benefited from Wikipedia's article variety, and believing that players could learn about new subjects by playing the game and collecting cards. 4Gamer.net praised the concept of collecting articles, believing that all players would be able to find cards on subjects that appealed to them. However, they felt that the content of the game itself, when putting aside Wikipedia's articles, was lacking.

== See also ==
- Wikipedia – The Text Adventure
