= Brave Frontier 2 =

2018 video game

- Developer: A-Lim
- Publisher: JP: A-Lim (Mobile)
- Director: Eiji Takahashi
- Producer: Eiji Takahashi
- Writers: Toshiyuki Ida; Kafu izui Kohei Ogi; Sachika Hayashi; Yukari Fukase; Mikagura
- Composers: Sound; Hikoshi Hashimoto; Tomoyoshi Sato; Ko Hayashi; Music; Kenji Ito; Minako Seki; Kaoru Wada; Noriyuki Iwadare; TAMAYO; Tadayoshi Makino
- Series: Brave Frontier
- Platforms: iOS; Android
- Release: iOS, Android: JP: February 22, 2018
- Genre: Role-playing game
- Modes: Single Player, Multiplayer

Brave Frontier 2 (ブレイブフロンティア2, Bureibu Furontia 2) is a mobile role-playing game developed by A-Lim and published by A-Lim for both iOS and Android. It is the sequel to the 2013 game Brave Frontier, originally released for the franchise's 5th anniversary, with Eiji Takahashi returning as both director and producer for the sequel, alongside newer staff. The game is released on February 22, 2018, for iOS and Android. The game stopped updates in March 2019 and ended service on April 27, 2022.

== Gameplay ==
Like the first game in the series, it follows the same gameplay format as Square Enix's Valkyrie Profile but differentiates itself from the original through its story-driven plot and gameplay. Players are allowed to bring up to 5 units in each stage with a "friend" unit in quest mode. Players make friends through friend requests. Attacking units in a battle rewards the player with Brave Burst Crystals and Heart Crystals. After an enemy is defeated, the player proceeds to the next stage until the boss, which is required to complete a level. After completing each mission, players are rewarded with Zel and items, as well as units acquired from each mission. When players complete the entire area, they'll be rewarded with one gem. However, if players fail a quest, they can use one gem to continue. Units have the ability to execute special attacks known as brave bursts and super brave bursts.

In a departure from the original game, the game will be the first to feature a double protagonist system, allowing players to play the stories of both main protagonists in the same game. A new mechanic known as Xross Brave Burst is introduced, which requires two or more units with mutual relationships to execute stronger attacks. Also, the game features an improved summoner avatar system that can be levelled up through branch evolution and equipped with various weapons and items. Alongside the improved summoner avatar system is the ability to raise pets as companions in quests, which, like units, can be evolved to become stronger. The game's director, Eiji Takahashi, also stated that standard features such as Frontier Hunter, Trials, and Arena will also be included in the game's release. But unlike its predecessor, Brave Frontier 2 has no Gacha system to get new units and relies more on buying new units using in-game currency.

== Story ==
20 years after the defeat of Karna Masta and the restoration of summoning ability within the Akras Summoner's Hall, deep in the world of Extas, Fabulaska was arrested for copying data on research forbidden to be accessed when two strange figures helped him in his escape. As this caught the eye of the Akras Summoners Hall back in Elgaia regarding the discovery of the new world, Noel, Lugina, and Roy went to Extas to negotiate with the authorities for the capture of Fabulaska in exchange for Noel's research data regarding the world of Bectas.

10 years later, in the year A.I.E. 300, a strange group called Negress makes their move, destroying countless kingdoms and worlds for their unknown ambitions. Though the Akras Summoners Hall is trying to pin down their every move, a strange gate started opening in Grand Gaia as the Summoners' Hall was sent to investigate. In another world in the Kingdom of Seltavia, Negress sets their sights on the kingdom's capital, Philharme, taking down various soldiers as they proceed with their plan to dominate various worlds. As the King ordered the citizens to escape, two main youth tried to make their escape; each of the kingdom's most powerful knights had fallen due to the mysterious black knight's presence. The main character and his childhood friend, Rin, were protecting the treasure trove underground with the help of Augus and Lory when they were caught by the black knight. But in the midst of their defeat, Augus used a strange orb to open a portal to another world, and Augus told both the hero and Rin to escape with the orb. However, the black knight commanded Shaia to attack the hero and Rin, distorting the portal as both of them were sucked away into it and were separated as they traversed into different worlds. Now, having been separated from Rin and found by the Akras Summoners, humanity's survival rests on the new hero and the Akras Summoners Guild in order to take down the dreaded Negress.

== Music ==
Unlike the music in Brave Frontier, which is synthesized, Brave Frontier 2 will feature a real orchestral soundtrack done by the Tokyo City Philharmonic Orchestra and composed by Hikoshi Hashimoto, Kenji Ito, Minako Seki, Kaoru Wada, Noriyuki Iwadare, Tamayo, and Tadayoshi Makino.

== Development ==
The game was first revealed at the December 2016 broadcast of BureNama, announcing the title logo and brief plans regarding the sequel. Takahashi also expresses his deep thanks regarding the success of the first game saying "In the future even after the new series has been released, the BF that is being enjoyed now, will continue to allow for both existing and new players to play it. We're thinking about various ways, but even with going into a second series, it's conversely unthinkable that we'd close off the product we've done so far until now." At the July 2017 broadcast of BureNama, concept art for the game is shown including two new NPC characters: Roy and Sasha a redesigned battle UI for the game and remastered art for the old units. In the 2017 BraveFest in Osaka in August 2017, the official staff revealed more redone artwork of older units and revamping for the original game's Arena system, as well as streaming of the first Prologue Motion Comic. In the 2017 BraveFest in Tokyo in September 2017, more concept art for units and art for the revamped UI system of the game is revealed alongside the Cross Brave Burst between Vargas and Lava. It also shows new units exclusive for the sequel. The game is scheduled to be released in Q4 2017, but is pushed back to Q1 2018 due to technical issues. Alim later revealed the game's first gameplay footage at the December 2017 broadcast of BureNama, detailing some of the features such as the basic battle system, Summoner Avatar, the Pet System, Cross Brave Burst, and the ability to buy units.

In an interview with Famitsu regarding the game's development, Takahashi stated that "Brave Frontier is a titled type, so you can do a sequel in the form of version up, and of course it was an idea. However, in a conversation I have with Hironobu Sakaguchi in the past, I remembered that he said "I think it's okay to put out a sequel or 2 or 3, even on a smartphone game", and as a result of considering various reasons, this time I wen to a sequel with a completely new work like this." He also said regarding the story and main character that "The first Brave Frontier is focused on the hero in Elgaia and Grand Gaia. But the hero in Brave Frontier 2 is a person living in the kingdom named Zeltabia which is totally different from them."

The game then hosted its Press Release Conference on February 12, 2018, which reveals the game's release date as well as several bonuses that can be obtained in the game itself. To also promote the game in Japan, A-Lim collaborated with Toei Company to produce two promotional videos featuring the 37th Sentai series Zyuden Sentai Kyoryuger, which also marked the reunion of the show's original cast members. The first one is a newly produced episode, while the other is a parody of the game done in the style of Super Sentai. Both videos were available limitedly in the game's official YouTube Channel.

== Release ==
The game is released on both iOS and Android platforms on February 22, 2018. A Pre-release campaign with various rewards that can be used in the game. According to Takahashi, there are no plans for a release outside Japan. The PC version was scheduled for release on DMM Games in Q3 2018, but was later cancelled.

== Reception ==
The game was ranked 67 within the first day of release on the Apple App Store in Japan.
