= Phantom of the Kill =

2014 mobile video game

- Developers: Fuji&gumi Games
- Publisher: Gumi
- Director: Ryoichi Ishikawa
- Producer: Jun Imaizumi
- Release: JP: October 23, 2014; NA: May 2016; EU: May 2016
- Genre: Role-playing
- Mode: Single-player

Phantom of the Kill (Japanese: ファントム オブ キル, Hepburn: Fantomu obu Kiru) is a mobile strategy role-playing video game developed by Fuji&gumi Games and published by Gumi for iOS and Android mobile phones and tablets. First released in Japan on October 23, 2014, this game features gameplay similar to the Fire Emblem series of video games. A global version was released in May 2016 but was later shut down in mid-2018. It generally received mixed reviews, with critics praising the gameplay, but criticizing the loading and repetition involved with playing the game.

== Gameplay ==
The game plays similarly to the core gameplay of Nintendo's Fire Emblem series of video games and combines elements of social-network games often found in mobile gaming. The game involves the player moving characters across a grid with chess-like movement requirements, and battling an opposing team of computer-controlled characters in turn-based combat. When characters take enough damage in combat, they get removed from the battlefield, with the team with remaining players being the victor. The game does not have permadeath, but characters who are defeated do lose equipped items.

== Story ==
In the main story, the game takes place in another world and focuses on Levaetein (later revealed as Amane in Zero's Rebellion), a mysterious girl known as a "Killer Princess". She once lived in another world until mysterious monsters attacked it, destroying civilization itself. Once she helped a man with a sword, she ventured to another world only to lose her memory and waking up in a field of flowers. When she tried to remember she gets ambushed by monsters before being helped by a Killer Princess named Tyrfing as she slew the monsters. Levaetein now must regain her memories for her true purpose while being joined by other Killer Princesses to defeat the demons plaguing the land.

The prequel story game takes place in a post-apocalyptic dystopic Tokyo. 200 years ago, strange demons start appearing in the human world where humanity is under threat of extinction. Today in AD 2917, demons now roam freely and continue to destroy everything. Humanity's last hope is the Killer Project, a dangerous Super Soldier Project created by the Ragnarok Institute that would create special beings called "Killer Princes and Princesses", that can defeat said demons and wield weapons capable of destroying them. The story focuses on Zero, the first Killer Prince as he tries to resolve things in the human world, regarding the attack of the demons and the Weapons used to defeat them.

== Development ==
Pre-registration began for the game began in August 2014, and the game was released in Japan in late 2014. Work on an English version began right away in early 2015, but wasn't officially announced as such until June 2015. It is later revealed that the global version would be a prequel story of the game, which focuses on the first Killer Prince. The game was released in over 120 countries in May 2016. The game's Western release was rebalanced to feature more difficult gameplay. The game had a cross-over event with Brave Frontier and Dempagumi.inc in June 2016, and Puella Magi Madoka Magica in November 2019.

The game's opening cinematic was overseen by Ghost in the Shell director Mamoru Oshii.

== Reception and sales ==
Reception

Review score
| Publication | Score |
|---|---|
| TouchArcade | 3.5/5 |

The game received mixed reviews from critics, who generally praised the core Fire Emblem-based game play, but criticized the social gaming aspects and extensive load times. TouchArcade praised the game's production values and core gameplay, but criticized the need for excessive grinding or blind luck needed to advance through the game, ultimately concluding that "...neither the story nor the gameplay are strong enough to elevate the game beyond the status of an average social RPG with excellent production values. Genre fans will likely get a kick out of it initially, but I have to believe that only the hardest of the hardcore will stick around once the grind sets in. Gamezebo similarly cited enjoyment in the gameplay, but strongly criticized the length and frequency of the game's loading screens, stating "Every time players go to attack an enemy, the game pauses, loads the phase, shows the character attacking the targeted enemy, the attack hits or misses, and then the game pauses and re-loads back to the overall battlefield view. This might be common practice in the games that inspired it, but when you’re already struggling to keep players engaged because of frequent loading and needless menu navigation, adding even more into the mix slows the experience to a crawl." Siliconera described the game as a "well-executed copycat" of Fire Emblem, that made up for the lack of character development with making it enjoyable to build fighting teams based more on skill and appearance than relevance to the story.

As of May 2016, the game had been downloaded 3.5 million times in Japan alone, and was one of the top-grossing Android releases in Japan.

== Derived titles ==
- Phantom of the Kill – Alternative Imitation is an idle RPG spin-off of Phantom of the Kill, featuring an optional NFT minting system. It was released on March 5, 2024.
