= Infinity Nikki =

2024 open-world dress-up adventure game

- Developer: Papergames
- Publishers: CHN: Papergames; TWN/HKG/MAC: Fearless; WW: Infold Games
- Series: Nikki
- Engine: Unreal Engine 5
- Platforms: Android iOS; PlayStation 5 Microsoft Windows macOS
- Release: 5 December 2024
- Genre: Action-adventure
- Modes: Single-player, co-op multiplayer

Infinity Nikki (Note: Chinese: 无限暖暖; pinyin: Wúxiàn Nuǎnnuǎn) is a free-to-play action-adventure game with dress-up elements developed and published by Papergames (with publishing outside mainland China under Infold Games), which released for Android, iOS, PlayStation 5, and Microsoft Windows on 5 December 2024. A MacOS version was released on 23 April 2026. It is the fifth installment in the Nikki series and a sequel to Shining Nikki. The game features open world exploration, platforming, and puzzle-solving.

Set in the world of Miraland, players accompany Nikki and her feline companion, Momo, on a quest to find the legendary Miracle Outfits. Different outfits grant abilities for navigating diverse environments and solving challenges.

== Gameplay ==
Infinity Nikki features "Stylist Duels", where players select outfits based on attributes such as Sweet, Fresh, Elegant, Sexy, and Cool to compete against opponents. Specific attire enables gliding or shrinking to access otherwise unreachable areas. There are also other ability outfits players can wear to trigger skills such as grooming, fishing, and catching bugs. It employs gacha elements, allowing players to acquire clothing items and accessories using in-game currency or microtransactions. The gacha system includes a pity mechanism, guaranteeing a 5-star item after a predetermined number of draws.

Since the 1.5 update, Infinity Nikki allows co-op gameplay for two people.

== Development ==
Infinity Nikki was developed by Chinese company Papergames using Unreal Engine 5 and Silicon Studio's Enlighten, emphasizing detailed visuals, including fabric textures and environmental design. CEO Yao Runhao said the development team included over 1,000 members. Kentaro Tominaga, a former The Legend of Zelda: Breath of the Wild director, is said to have worked on the game from Kyoto.

Shortly after launch, the official website was hacked, displaying messages promoting Genshin Impact and urging harmful actions. The issue was resolved without significant long-term damage.

The wishlist count for Infinity Nikki on Steam exceeded 10,000 on 1 March 2025, and exceeded 50,000 on 6 March 2025.

On 19 February 2025, the brand new OST of Infinity Nikki was officially released on music platforms.

On 21 April 2026, InFold games announced MacOS release date of 23 April 2026.

== Music ==
The music for Infinity Nikki was recorded by FoldEcho, a music production studio, and features a large team of composers. Each background track corresponds to a specific in-game location, dynamically transitioning as the player moves across the world. The orchestral compositions were recorded with the Budapest Scoring Orchestra, integrating a wide range of instruments, including strings, flutes, Irish whistles, guitars, and accordions to enhance the game's musical atmosphere .

The soundtrack attempts to immerse the player in the different environments by playing music that evokes an appropriate emotion for each one, such as how in lighter, more scenic areas of the game, the soundtrack is more uplifting.

The official Infinity Nikki soundtrack is being released gradually, with multiple albums debuting over time. The first album, Songs of Flowers and Wishes, released on 24 January 2025. Subsequent releases include Starburst for the New Year, A Wish Upon a Shooting Star, Stonewoods and the Silvergale, and The Promise of the Aurosa and the Dawn. These collections feature a variety of compositions, ranging from orchestral symphonies to intimate acoustic pieces, each designed to complement the game's world and themes.

The version 1.0 theme song of Infinity Nikki, "Together Till Infinity" was released on 14 November 2024, and performed by Jessie J. The version 2.0 theme song is sung by Idina Menzel.

=== Composers ===
The game's soundtrack was composed by a diverse international team, including Enchao Li, Dafei Chen, Bastien Rousset, Yakov Alexandrov, Nicholas Horsten, Xu Wang, Leonardo Furore, 炸炸 (Zhàzhà), 铱铱 (Yīyī), Jason Huang, Seiji Hotta, John Konsolakis, Luke Mombrea, 天钦 (Tiānqīn), hou, Gai Gai, Chengjun Tang, 提糯Tino, xiean, Artur Baryshev, Yichen Lin, Kevin Tan, Haihang Yu, Xi Li, Adam Gubman, lbg, 高铭 (Gāo Míng), Xiongguan Zhang, 星幂 (Xīngmì), Dong Liu, Lukas Piel, Pierce Constanti, Kristen Chen, Jiaxing Peng, E·KoinuTornado, Qinfeng, Lei Shi, Yuetong Wang, 狐狸球球 (Húlí Qiúqiú), 红唐 (Hóng Táng), 蔡琛 (Cài Chēn), Wenzhao Yang, 张家铭 (Zhāng Jiāmíng) and 陈义 (Chén Yì).

== Reception ==
Reception

Aggregate scores
Aggregator	Score
Metacritic	PC: 80/100; PS5: 75/100
OpenCritic	82% recommend

Review scores
Publication	Score
Digital Trends	3.5/5
Eurogamer	4/5
Famitsu	34/40
IGN	9/10
PC Gamer (UK)	74/100

Infinity Nikki received generally positive reviews from critics. Carli Velocci of IGN praised the game for its extensive content, stating, "It's rare to see a series make such a huge leap, but Infinity Nikki has somehow done so with grace". Jessica Orr of Eurogamer noted that Infinity Nikki is not merely another game inspired by Genshin Impact but surpasses it in many ways, claiming that it "might just replace Genshin as the new standard that future open-world gacha games are compared to". Orr also suggested that the game has the potential to shake up the gacha game industry, much like Genshin Impact did in 2020, adding that miHoYo now faces a formidable competitor.

Similarly, a reviewer from PC Gamer remarked that Infinity Nikki has the potential to stand alongside the biggest names in the gacha genre. Nicole Carpenter of Polygon commended the developers for seamlessly combining the dress-up gameplay and fashion competitions from the franchise with a fantastical world filled with hidden dark secrets. Carpenter highlighted the game's focus on fashion and its lack of violent elements, suggesting it is aimed at a female audience.

The game reached over 10 million downloads in four days after launch and 20 million at the time of The Game Awards 2024 in December.

=== Accolades ===
In December 2024, Infinity Nikki was nominated for IGN's Game of the Year. It won Breakthrough of the Year at the UCG Game Awards 2024. It won 2025 Apple Design Awards for Visuals and Graphics. At the 2026 NYX Game Awards, it was recognized with two awards in the PC Game category: Best Art Direction and Open World.

=== Mixed reviews in 1.5 update ===
On 29 April 2025, the game released its 1.5 version update. At the same time, the game launched on Steam to mixed reviews. The launch was heavily criticized for the state of its release, as players have encountered bugs and issues. Infold and Papergames allegedly censored the term "boycott" in-game and in official community social media channels, prompting players to call for a "girlcott" to circumvent these restrictions. The development team of the game issued an apology and extended Version 1.5's end date to ensure stability and prevent recurring issues. They also shared updated plans for the delay period, compensation, and key optimizations.
