= Azur Lane =

2017 video game and its franchise

- English release logo

アズールレーン (Azūru Rēn)
- Genre: Action, military
- Video game
- Developer: Shanghai Manjuu, Xiamen Yongshi
- Publisher: CHN: Bilibili; JP/WW: Yostar; KR: XD Global; HK/MAC/TW: PWB Play
- Produced by: Yuwan (Note: 鱼丸; Yúwán, also known as N.ec 鱼丸)
- Music by: Shade; Deadball P
- Genre: Shoot 'em up, construction and management simulation, role-playing video game
- Engine: Unity
- Platform: Android, iOS
- Released: CHN: May 25, 2017 (iOS), June 2, 2017 (Android); JP: September 14, 2017; KR: February 27, 2018; WW: May 20, 2019; HK/MAC/TW: October 4, 2019
Further information
Video game
Azur Lane Crosswave
Developer	Felistella
Publisher	JP: Compile Heart; TW: Justdan; EN: Idea Factory International
Genre	Third-person shooter, construction and management simulation
Engine	Unreal Engine 4
Platform	PlayStation 4 Windows; Nintendo Switch
Released	PS4: JP: August 29, 2019; WW: February 13, 2020; Windows: WW: February 13, 2020; Nintendo Switch: JP: September 17, 2020; NA: February 16, 2021; EU: February 19, 2021
Anime television series
Directed by	Tensho
Written by	Jin Haganeya
Music by	Yasunori Nishiki
Studio	Bibury Animation Studios
Licensed by	Crunchyroll
Original network	Tokyo MX, SUN, KBS, BS11, AT-X
Original run	October 3, 2019 – March 20, 2020
Episodes	12 (Note: There are six scheduled Blu-ray volumes, with each volume containing two episodes.)
Audio drama
Written by	Tsukasa
Print media
Manga: Azur Lane: Slow Ahead!; Azur Lane Comic Anthology; Azur Lane Queen's Orders; Azur Lane Comic à la Carte; Light novel: Starting My Life as a Commander with Laffey; Episode of Belfast; Ayanami, Happily Married

Azur Lane

Chinese name
- Traditional Chinese: 碧藍航線
- Simplified Chinese: 碧蓝航线
Transcriptions
Standard Mandarin
- Hanyu Pinyin: Bìlán Hángxiàn
- Bopomofo: ㄅㄧˋ ㄌㄢˊ ㄏㄤˊ ㄒㄧㄢˋ
- Wade–Giles: Pi^{4}-lan^{2} Hang^{2}-hsien^{4}

Korean name
- Hangul: 벽람항로
- Hanja: 碧藍航路
Transcriptions
- Revised Romanization: Byeongnam Hangno
- McCune–Reischauer: Pyŏngnam Hangno

Japanese name
- Katakana: アズールレーン
Transcriptions
- Romanization: Azūru Rēn
- Nihon-shiki: Azûru Rên

Azur Lane (Simplified Chinese: 碧蓝航线; traditional Chinese: 碧藍航線; pinyin: Bìlán Hángxiàn; lit. 'Deep Blue Course') is a side-scrolling shoot 'em up video game created by Shanghai Manjuu and Xiamen Yongshi, released in 2017 for the iOS and Android operating systems. Set in an alternate timeline of World War II, players engage in side-scrolling shooter gameplay, using female moe anthropomorphic characters based on warships from the war's major participants. Other gameplay elements, like customizing a dorm and in-game characters, are also present.

First released in China in May and in Japan in September 2017, Azur Lane was successful at launch, especially in Japan, where the player count reached five million within four months after its release. Players have voted the game among the top five on Google Play's Best Game of 2017 list for the region. Critics have attributed the game's popularity to its original and well-designed gameplay system. An English version started open beta in August 2018 and was formally released in May 2019. Later, in December 2019, the English version was expanded to Latin American region. PWB Play simultaneously released it to Hong Kong, Macau, and Taiwan in October 2019.

The game has been adapted into several manga and novelizations. Azur Lane Crosswave, a 3D adaptation for PlayStation 4, was published by Compile Heart in August 2019 with mixed reception. Crosswave's English localization was released in February 2020 for PlayStation 4 and PC. A Nintendo Switch port of the game was released in Japan in September 2020, and in February 2021 in North America and in February 2021 in Europe.

An anime television series adaptation by Bibury Animation Studios was announced in 2018 and aired from October 2019 to March 2020. Funimation licensed this series for a SimulDub while Beta Film licensed this series for Latin America. An anime television series adaptation of the Azur Lane: Slow Ahead! manga by studios Candy Box and Yostar Pictures aired from January to March 2021; a second season has been announced. A two-episode original video animation adaptation of the Azur Lane Queen's Orders manga was released in July 2023.

== Gameplay ==
Main interface, with the character Repulse. Players may select a character to appear on main interface as a "secretary".

Azur Lane is a side-scrolling shoot 'em up, simulation, and role-playing video game. Players collect characters that are moe anthropomorphic interpretations of World War II warships ("shipgirls"), mainly from the United States Navy, Royal Navy, Imperial Japanese Navy and Kriegsmarine, with other ships from the French Navy (both Vichy and Free France flavors), Republic of China Navy, People's Liberation Army Navy, Regia Marina, Soviet Navy, Imperial Russian Navy, Imperial German Navy and Royal Netherlands Navy being added later; additionally, ships from the Age of Sail were added in as a faction named Tempesta. Players organize them into fleets of six and confront AI-controlled enemies or other players' fleets. These ships can gain experience points (EXP) from various methods (such as from battles, completing commissions, or placing these ships into Dormitories), and they require a certain amount of EXP to gain a stronger level. They have a certain maximum level limit on how far players can level up their ships, which can be increased via Limit Break. Most characters have their own set of upgradable abilities that can be activated in battle.

Personifications of American destroyer USS Laffey (DD-459), British destroyer HMS Javelin, and German destroyer Z23 (Chinese, English release) or Japanese destroyer Ayanami (Japanese, Korean release) are available for players to select as a starter ship. They are referred to as protagonists in-game. As of October 2024, more than 600 characters have been introduced to the game, representing ships from nine countries that participated in the war. The game is also notable for including preserved museum ships as its characters, such as the Japanese Mikasa and Russian Aurora.

An endgame content Operation Siren was announced on December 14, 2020, for a late December release.

=== Battle ===
Formation interface of Azur Lane

When preparing for the game's main mode, players can organize two fleets (as the game progresses, they will unlock up to a maximum of 6 fleets), consisting of a front row and a back row, with three slots available in each row. Destroyers, light cruisers, and heavy cruisers can be allotted to the front row, while the back row is reserved for battleships, aircraft cruisers, monitors, repair ships, battlecruisers, and aircraft carriers; the positions of certain sailing frigates are determined between either row. Different combinations of ships are required to achieve victory in different battle situations. Players may then select and enter a map.

On entering a map, the player's fleet is placed on a grid-like map similar to that in the game Battleship. The map contains nodes, which are either combat nodes, which are enemy fleets, some immobile and others that pursue the player, or non-combat nodes, which provide ammunition, or mystery nodes, which can provide supplies such as repair kits, upgrade materials, or can spawn a special combat node called a Treasure Fleet. Players must navigate optimally and assemble their fleets tactically to clear obstructing enemies and, using minimal movements, reach the map's boss. When the player moves their fleet across the map, they can be ambushed in random encounters from which they may take damage, or they can be forced to engage the enemy, using fuel and ammo. Fuel is one of the two in-game resources. Ammo points are assigned to player fleets at each map, with one ammo point deducted at each battle. Fleets that run out of ammo can still fight, but may only deal half damage.

Battle interface of Azur Lane

When battling an enemy, players can use a virtual joystick to control the front row, which can automatically fire shells at targets and manually launch torpedoes. While stationary, the back row can send shell barrages, and the player can manually call in airstrikes. These will activate a bullet-clearing effect, removing all projectiles and torpedoes on screen. Players have an auto mode option to give up this control to the game's AI. Characters' health is fully replenished when completing or exiting a map. Morale points are deducted for each fleet character in a battle. Should a character fall in battle, they cannot join in further action on the map, and a larger number of morale points are deducted for the fallen character at the end of the battle. Sustained low morale for a character decreases their stats and affection points. Low affection points lead the character to greet the player with vocals reflecting their disappointment.

The game features a player-versus-player mode. The player may prepare a defence fleet and organize an offence fleet to challenge opposing players' defence fleets. In this mode, battles are controlled entirely by AI, and the bullet-clearing effect of airstrikes is disabled. Tokens can be gained, and the player's ranking can rise through victory in this mode. Players receive no penalty if they lose a challenge or their defence fleet is defeated by other players. Exclusive characters and other items can be obtained using tokens (which are called Merits). The ranking is refreshed every 15 days. Additional mechanics were introduced after the game's release. Submarine and anti-submarine warfare systems were introduced in May 2018. This included anti-submarine campaign maps and characters based on German U-boats, and American and Japanese submarines. A ship's cat system was introduced in September 2018. Various cat breeds can be obtained at a cattery. They can be trained to provide buffs when brought along with fleets to battle.

=== Dormitory ===
The game sports a "Dormitory" feature. Characters in their chibi forms may be put in the furnished Dormitory where they can walk around and sit, sleep, or bathe. Characters may passively gain experience points and recover morale when they are given food by players. Players can purchase food using fuel or in-game currency. Players can also purchase variously themed, and occasionally time-limited, furniture sets and decorations using "furniture coins" obtained by sending characters through special quests. Furniture and decorations raise the rate experience is gained. They can be arranged freely. Players may increase Dormitory character capacity, unlock a second floor which recovers morale, and buy special interactive furniture using the in-game currency. As well, monuments can be awarded by clearing event stages. Players may inspect other players' Dormitories.

=== Oath ===
When a character's affection (which act as another form of levelling in game) points are raised to 100 through battle, secretary, or Dormitory, players may choose to give a "promise ring" to this character. A "promise ring" can be obtained through quests once. Additional rings can be purchased using in-game currency in the items shop. The developers also give out these rings for free during special occasions. Players may also give customized names to these characters but may only do so every 30 days for each character. Furthermore, a few of the most popular characters will also gain unique wedding dress costumes for the wedding. They will also gain additional stat bonuses after being given the promise ring.

=== Island Planner ===
In 2025, a new Island Planner mode was added where it feature having the Player as the Commander helping Akashi set up and develop a new island. There the Player can help run farms, mills, restaurants and other facilities with allowing them to have various shipgirls work.

It features shipgirl versions of the RMS Olympic, RMS Homeric, RMS Queen Mary, RMS Lusitania and other civilian liners running the facilities.

== Synopsis ==
The start of the game features an anthropomorphic recreation of the Battle of the Denmark Strait, where the personification of famed British battlecruiser HMS Hood is sunk by characters representing the German forces. The game features the eponymous military alliance, the "Azur Lane", comprising the nations of Eagle Union (United States), Royal Navy (United Kingdom), Sakura Empire (Empire of Japan), Iron Blood (Nazi Germany), Dragon Empery (Republic of China), Northern Parliament (Soviet Union), Iris Orthodoxy (France), and Sardegna Empire (Kingdom of Italy). The alliance is split in two because of an alien intervention, with the Iron Blood, Sakura Empire, and Sardegna Empire forming the opposing "Crimson Axis" faction. Using technology provided by the aliens called "Sirens", the Crimson Axis invades their former allies. As a result, many of Azur Lane's territories came under occupation of the Crimson Axis, with the Iris Orthodoxy split into Iris Libre (Free France) and Vichya Dominion (Vichy France). The rest of the game's main plot partially follows the United States naval engagements in the Pacific War. Chapters represent several decisive battles of the war including the Battle of Midway, the Naval Battle of Guadalcanal, and the Mariana and Palau Islands campaign.

== Development ==
Azur Lane's producer, Yuwan, a well-known uploader to the Chinese video sharing website Bilibili, began developing the game with five of his college friends, with the initial notion of "creating a doujin game, if a commercial one is not possible". Seeing many similar games created in Greater China after Kantai Collection's success, the developers aimed to create "something different from previous works of ship moe anthropomorphism". As such, they intentionally avoided using a turn-based strategy game mechanic like that used by Kantai Collection and most of its followers. They also shifted the focus on Japanese ships to those from other countries involved in World War II.

One particular difficulty was incorporating shoot 'em up elements, as there were no existing works to reference. An early version of the game featured a combat system of a five-character fleet in a single or double column line of battle. World of Warships, a World War II naval warfare simulation game popular in China, influenced some of the gameplay design.

The developers sought to further differentiate the game by featuring characters based on preserved museum ships from earlier times, such as the pre-dreadnought battleship Mikasa of World War I, which was served as a flagship during the Russo-Japanese war, and the Russian protected cruiser Aurora, the ship famed for its October Revolution involvement. Keeping game balance and rarity with these characters was difficult, however, the developers were intent on featuring museum ships, and intend to introduce more characters like this in the future. A series of characters based on proposed or unfinished World War II warships, including Neptune, Saint-Louis and Ibuki, were introduced as part of a collaboration with Wargaming, publisher of World of Warships.

Many young Japanese voice actors lent their talents to the game. The decision to employ an all-Japanese voice cast with a focus on younger actors was the result of a lack of professional voice actors in China, as well as the team's intention to give younger Japanese actors opportunities to perform. The game's notable voice actors include Yui Ishikawa, Rie Takahashi and Risa Taneda.

Due to a lack of technology and funding, Manju chose to collaborate with Yongshi Network (a subsidiary of G-bits Network Technology), a startup team in Yuwan's hometown of Xiamen, to develop "Azur Lane". Shanghai's Manjuu Ltd. provided the audiovisual design and the writing for Azur Lane. Xiamen's Yongshi Ltd. (Chinese: 厦门勇仕网络技术有限公司) was responsible for programming, game data design and content. The companies share joint authorship of the game and share its copyright, with a 65%/35% share of its revenue.

== Release ==
The game first launched in China in May 2017, published by Bilibili. Yostar published the Japanese version in September that year. XD Global published the South Korean version in March 2018. The English-language version was announced as being in development in June 2018. Open beta began on August 16, 2018. On May 20, 2019, the English version was formally released along with the rollout of the 2019 UI overhaul.

Li Hengda, president of Yostar Inc., revealed that although he saw Azur Lane's potential, he did not expect the level of popularity the game experienced in Japan. Believing that around 10 people would suffice, Li later admitted his mistake in only having four full-time employees and two interns before the game's release, as they had to work from morning until midnight as the game's popularity grew until the end of 2017. Through Azur Lane, Yostar established contact with distinguished Japanese enterprises and creators and was met with welcoming responses. Tony Taka, known for his work on the Shining series, was delighted to be invited to provide character design for HMS Centaur (R06), marking his first work in a mobile game. Jin Haganeya, writer for Demonbane, agreed to write the script for the game's anime adaptation.

== Promotion ==
A special program featuring voice actress Yui Ishikawa visiting the office of one of developers, Manjuu Ltd., in Shanghai was aired on the Japanese streaming television platform AbemaTV in May 2018. However, misuse during the program of the trademarked term "kanmusu" (艦娘) to refer to the game's personified warship characters led to Yostar being publicly warned by DMM.com, publisher of Kantai Collection. Yostar issued an apology, and called on players of Azur Lane to provide alternative terms for the game's personified warship characters. More than a thousand submissions were received. In September 2018, Yostar announced the new term would be "Kinetics Artifactual Navy-Self-regulative En-lore Node", abbreviated as "KAN-SEN" and is the backronym of the Japanese word "kansen" (艦船).

=== Collaborations ===
==== In-game ====
A January 2018 collaboration event with Compile Heart introduced the protagonists of the Hyperdimension Neptunia series to Azur Lane. Players may obtain Neptunia's protagonists with naval elements, as well as their "goddess forms" as separate characters.

In April 2018, Yostar and Wargaming Japan announced a collaboration between the game and World of Warships. Azur Lane players may obtain characters based on ships from World of Warships through a new interface called "Development Dock", while World of Warships players may purchase Azur Lane characters as voiced captains, and skins for ships based on design elements of Azur Lane's namesake characters. In April 2019, the WoWS collaboration was further extended by season 2, introducing new characters into both games. In August 2020, the collaboration was once again extended by a 3rd season, introducing a wave of new ships, skins and captains in both games.

A collaboration with Sunrise in May 2018 featured a crossover plotline with the anime Armored Trooper VOTOMS. The Marshydog mecha from the show was added to Azur Lane as a furniture item. A collaboration event with Aquaplus in November 2018 made characters from the visual novel Utawarerumono obtainable in Azur Lane.

An April 2019 collaboration with Kizuna AI introduced the virtual YouTuber as 4 different in-game characters. Between November 27 and December 10, 2019, seven Hololive members (Murasaki Shion, Nakiri Ayame, Ookami Mio, Natsuiro Matsuri, Minato Aqua, Shirakami Fubuki and Tokino Sora) became playable characters as part of another collaboration.

A collaboration event with Dead or Alive Xtreme Venus Vacation took place between November 26 and December 9, 2020. The event called Vacation Lane featured an original story, new ships, skins, and furniture sets. The Dead or Alive characters featured were Marie Rose, Honoka, Kasumi, Misaki, Nyotengu, Nagisa, and Monica. On April 24, 2023, it was announced that this crossover event would have a re-run from April 27 to May 11. All previously featured characters would return with the inclusion of Luna and Tamaki. A third collaboration took place in April 2026. A second original story event called Beachside Brilliance added new ships, skins, and furniture sets. The new featured characters were all Venus Vacation originals including: Elise, Shandy, Yukino, Patty, Shizuku, and Tsukushi.

The collaboration event of anime television series SSSS.Gridman and SSSS.Dynazenon that ran from November 25 to December 8, 2021, saw the introductions of 7 limited-time obtainable characters; Rikka Takarada, Akane Shinjō, Yume Minami, Hass, Namiko, Mujina and Chise Asukagawa. In 2023, all previously featured characters returned in a rerun event that ran from July 20 to August 2, with the introduction of Princess Hime, and The 2nd from the film Gridman Universe.

Between November 2 and December 7, 2022, six new limited-time characters were introduced (Kala Ideas, Klaudia Valentz, Patricia Abelheim, Reisalin Stout, Lila Decyrus, and Serri Glaus) as part of the collaboration with two video games from the Atelier franchise developed by Gust Corporation; Atelier Ryza 2: Lost Legends & the Secret Fairy and Atelier Ryza 3: Alchemist of the End & the Secret Key. In 2025, all aforementioned characters from Atelier Ryza were re-listed in a limited time rerun to coincide with another collaboration event with Gust covering Atelier Yumia: The Alchemist of Memories & the Envisioned Land, featuring 4 new characters (Yumia Leissfeldt, Isla von Duerer, Lenja, and Nina Freide).

==== Miscellaneous ====
Yostar has held illustration contests with Japanese art community Pixiv to promote the game. Winners in the contest held in December 2017 were rewarded with cash and their designs featured on the game's loading screens. Winning designs from a wedding dress illustration contest in July 2018 were also planned to be implemented in the game.

Yostar licensed the Japanese company GRSPER to create virtual reality wedding ceremonies with the game's characters in August 2018. The crowdfunding project was cancelled in October 2018 because GRSPER did not meet its funding goal and was having communication difficulties with voice actors and their agencies.

In 2022, the game collaborated with Yamaha and its employee-run team, Iwata Racing Family (IRF), to race a YZF-R1 sports motorcycle that appears in-game as Essex's motorcycle at the Suzuka 8 Hours.

=== Live events ===
In 2023, the game collaborated with the CarrierCon fan convention for anime, video game, comic and cosplay fans aboard the USS Hornet (CV-12), which is personified in-game as Hornet II to distinguish her from the original Hornet (CV-8) and is currently the USS Hornet Museum ship in Alameda, Oakland, California. Later that year, the same ship was chosen to host the game's live event celebrating the 5th anniversary of its English/worldwide release.

In 2025, the game similarly held 7th anniversary celebrations of its English/worldwide release aboard USS New Jersey (BB-62), which is personified in-game and is currently the Battleship New Jersey Museum & Memorial in Camden, New Jersey just across the Delaware River from Philadelphia. The French destroyer Maillé-Brézé (D627), now a museum ship in Nantes and whose previous Vauquelin-class incarnation is personified in-game, also hosted a pop-up event – the first official event of its kind in Europe.

== Other media ==
=== Print media ===
Azur Lane was adapted into several manga and novels. The Azur Lane Comic Anthology, a comic anthology series currently up to four volumes, is being published by Ichijinsha and sold on Amazon Japan. Azur Lane Comic à la Carte, another comic anthology, was published in October 2018.

Kodansha published a spin-off light novel featuring the character Laffey as protagonist, titled Starting My Life as a Commander with Laffey, (Note: ラフィーと始める指揮官生活, Laffey to Hajimeru Shikikan Seikatsu) in June 2018. Shueisha published another novelization, Episode of Belfast, featuring the character based on HMS Belfast, in June 2018. Overlap, Inc. published the third spin-off light novel featuring the character Ayanami as protagonist, titled Ayanami, Happily Married, (Note: アズールレーン ～綾波、ケッコンするです～, Azur Lane: Ayanami, Kekkon-suru desu) in December 2018.

In addition, a food-centric spin-off, Smile Dish! (Note: アズールレーン スマイルディッシュ!) by Hirose Madoka, features the characters based on British C–class destroyers HMS Cygnet, HMS Crescent and HMS Comet sampling the food of various countries represented in-game.

=== Console adaptation ===
Azur Lane Crosswave, a 3D shooter game for PlayStation 4 was announced in September 2018. Crosswave features Azur Lane's characters battling against realistic warships and warplanes. The game follows a different story with new characters also making their debut. This console adaptation was developed by Felistella using Unreal Engine 4 and was published by Compile Heart on August 29, 2019. An English-language release was published by Idea Factory International in North America and Europe in 2020. The localization features Japanese voice-overs and sold in both digital and retail formats. A Nintendo Switch port of the game was released in Japan on September 17, 2020, and on February 16, 2021, in North America and in Europe on February 19, 2021.

=== Anime ===
An anime television series adaptation was announced in September 2018. The anime was directed by Tensho, director of Grisaia and Rewrite's anime adaptations, with writer Jin Haganeya, and Yasunori Nishiki composing the series' music. Tensho's Bibury Animation Studios animated the series, their first anime television series since the studio's inception in May 2017. Yostar head, Li Hengda, revealed that the animation project began in late 2017, when the game experienced its breakout in popularity. The choice of Haganeya to be the writer was due to the Demonbane franchise being one of Hengda's personal favorites. The series premiered on October 3, 2019, on Tokyo MX, SUN, KBS, BS11, and AT-X. May'n performed the series' opening theme song "graphite/diamond", while Kano performed the series' ending theme song "Hikari no Michishirube". Episodes 11 and 12 were originally scheduled to air on December 19 and 26, 2019, but were delayed to March 13 and 20, 2020, respectively, due to production issues. Funimation had licensed the series for a SimulDub. Following Sony's acquisition of Crunchyroll, the series was moved to Crunchyroll.

No.	Title	Directed by (Note: Information is taken from the ending credits of each episode.)	Written by	Original release date	English air date
1	"ACTIVATION - The Girls Who Soar on the Seas"; Transliteration: "【Kidō】Umi o Kakeru Shōjo-tachi" (Japanese: 【起動】海を駆ける少女たち)	Tenshō	Jin Haganeya	October 3, 2019	October 17, 2019
When the Earth's oceans are attacked by a mysterious alien force called the Sirens, four major nations, Eagle Union, the Royal Navy, the Sakura Empire and the Iron Blood form the "Azur Lane" military alliance to combat the Sirens using shipgirls, girls fused with naval warships. Eventually, the Sirens are defeated, but a rift forms between the factions, with the Eagle Union and Royal Navy coming in opposition against the Sakura Empire and Iron Blood. Reinforcements are sent to an Azur Lane base near the Sakura Empire, where Cleveland and Prince of Wales greet the arrival of Illustrious and Unicorn. Ayanami infiltrates the base to spy on its defenses, but inadvertently befriends Javelin, Laffey, and Unicorn. The Sakura Empire then launches a surprise attack on the base led by Kaga and Akagi. Javelin and Ayanami reluctantly battle each other while the rest of the defenders attempt to fight off the attack. When it looks like the defenders are about to be overrun, Enterprise arrives and singlehandedly turns the tide of the battle, heavily damaging Kaga and forcing the Sakura Empire forces to retreat. As they withdraw, Kaga and Akagi announce that the Sakura Empire and Iron Blood have formed their own alliance, the Red Axis, and formally declare war on Azur Lane.
2	"MELEE - Pulsing Waves, Steel Wings"; Transliteration: "【Gekisen】Kodō no Nami, Kōtetsu no Tsubasa" (Japanese: 【激戦】鼓動の波、鋼鉄の翼)	Yūichirō Aoki	Jin Haganeya	October 10, 2019	October 24, 2019
As Azur Lane works to repair the damage to their base and treating the injured personnel, including Enterprise and San Diego, it is revealed that the cause of conflict between them and Red Axis is the Red Axis' willingness to use dangerous Siren technology for their own ends. Enterprise remains on watch, despite her repairs only being partially complete. Akagi and Kaga are also recovering from the battle when they are met by Prinz Eugen. Akagi sends Zuikaku and Shoukaku to ambush an Azur Lane fleet and asks Prinz Eugen to assist them. Prinz Eugen agrees, bringing Z23 and Ayanami with her. The Azur Lane fleet, consisting of Eagle Union shipgirls of Hammann, Arizona, Northampton, Helena, Long Island and Enterprise's sister, Hornet is attacked by the Red Axis. Enterprise mobilizes to help them despite her damage, with Cleveland, Javelin, and Laffey following her. While Enterprise battles Zuikaku and Shoukaku and Cleveland assists damaged shipgirls, Javelin and Laffey remain reluctant to fight Z23 and Ayanami. As the Azur Lane and Red Axis forces battle each other, the main Royal Navy fleet led by Queen Elizabeth arrives. Enterprise manages to gain the upper hand on Zuikaku but her unrepaired damage causes her equipment to fail at a critical moment. However, Enterprise is saved by the timely arrival of a shipgirl dressed as a maid.
3	"ELEGANCE - Perchance, Like A Human"; Transliteration: "【Yūga】Aruiwa Hito no Yō ni" (Japanese: 【優雅】或いはヒトのように)	Kento Shintani	Jin Haganeya	October 17, 2019	October 31, 2019
Enterprise has a dream of a short term memory of her big sister, Yorktown, who was bedridden after barely escaped death and receiving a peptalk from her, then wakes up in her dorm room and properly meets the maid who saved her in the previous battle. Recalling the events, the maid is revealed to be Belfast. She delays the Red Axis forces long enough that the main Royal Navy forces which consisting of the Royal Navy leader Queen Elizabeth and her elite officers, Warspite, Hood, and two other main core members; Edinburgh and Sheffield. Their arrival forces the Red Axis to withdraw. Concerned about Enterprise's disregard for her own safety, Prince of Wales and Illustrious consult with Queen Elizabeth for a solution. Meanwhile, Vestal arrives on the base and is immediately upset at the poor state Enterprise's rig is in. Enterprise is met by Belfast and Unicorn, who convince her to attend a beach party the other shipgirls are holding. Unicorn thanks Enterprise for saving her, and Enterprise reveals she feels shipgirls are only meant to be weapons, and the ocean is only a source of conflict. As Unicorn leaves to play with Javelin and Laffey, Belfast confronts Enterprise directly, warning her that if she continues to fight like she did in the previous battle, she'll eventually forget her reason for fighting in the first place. The base then receives a distress call, with Enterprise, Cleveland, Hammann, and Belfast leaving to investigate. They find Ning Hai and Ping Hai of the Dragon Empery. They explain they were ambushed by Siren ships when a damaged Siren ship attacks. Enterprise uses herself as a distraction to draw the Siren's attention, but ends up being saved by Belfast when her rig malfunctions again. Seeing how Enterprise is actually compassionate towards others, Belfast decides to accompany Enterprise and teach her how be a proper "gentlewoman".
4	"SAKURA - Cloak and Dagger"; Transliteration: "【Rōran】Gaitō to Tanken" (Japanese: 【桜嵐】外套と短剣)	Enishi Ōshima	Jin Haganeya	October 24, 2019	November 7, 2019
Akagi, Kaga, Shoukaku, Zuikaku, and Ayanami return to the Sakura Empire base, where they are greeted by Soryu and Hiryu. Back at the Azur Lane base, Belfast takes it upon herself to serve as Enterprise's personal maid in an effort to draw out her inner humanity. Ping Hai and Ning Hai then report that while on a scouting mission, they encountered a Siren fleet being led by a high-class Siren, suggesting the Sirens are planning to take advantage of the conflict between Azur Lane and Red Axis. In order to gain more information, Sheffield and Edinburgh infiltrate the Sakura Empire base. Akagi is given permission from the Sakura Empire Leader, Nagato, to proceed with "Project Orochi". Ayanami reunites with fellow destroyers Yukikaze, Yuudachi and Shigure. Zuikaku, still upset at her inability to defeat Enterprise, receives words of encouragement from Takao. Sheffield and Edinburgh follow Akashi to a cove beneath the base, where Akashi witnesses Akagi collaborating with a Siren Leader, Observer, to construct Project Orochi, a massive Siren battleship. Observer moves to eliminate Akashi to silence her, but Sheffield and Edinburgh intervene, stealing the Black Box critical to Project Orochi's completion. They are able to slip past Takao and Ayanami and escape with both the Black Box and Akashi. Afterwards, while still loyal to Sakura Empire, Ayanami still continues to question her motivation to fight.
5	"REUNION - Reaching Out To You"; Transliteration: "【Saikai】Sono Te o Sashinobete" (Japanese: 【再会】その手をさし伸べて)	Kento Shintani; Yūichirō Aoki	Jin Haganeya	October 31, 2019	November 14, 2019
Sheffield, Edinburgh, and Akashi are forced to hide on an abandoned island as the Sakura Empire and Iron Blood fleets form a blockade around it. Azur Lane sends a large rescue fleet to break the blockade. As the main fleet led by Prince of Wales stages a diversionary attack, a small group consisting of Belfast, Cleveland, Javelin, and Laffey sneak through the blockade and reach the island. Belfast and Cleveland encounter Takao and Atago while Javelin and Laffey face Ayanami again. Zuikaku and Shoukaku head out to try and engage Enterprise while Sheffield's group is cornered by Iron Blood's fleet consists of Prinz Eugen, Z23, Z1, and Köln. Cleveland holds off Takao and Atago while Belfast assists Sheffield. Zuikaku and Shoukaku discover that they were tricked into following Hornet while Enterprise also infiltrated the island. Enterprise forces Prinz Eugen and her fleet to retreat. Ayanami attacks Javelin and Laffey, but remains confused as to why they won't fight back until Laffey tells her that despite being on opposite sides, they want to be friends.
6	"SHACKLES - Tying Bonds, Binding Hearts"; Transliteration: "【Kihan】Kizuna o Tsunagu, Kokoro o Shibaru" (Japanese: 【羈絆】絆を繋ぐ、心を縛る)	Yūichirō Aoki	Jin Haganeya; Renji Ōki	November 7, 2019	November 21, 2019
Despite Laffey reaching out to Ayanami, Ayanami refuses her offer of friendship and flees. Thanks to Belfast's help, Enterprise begins to interact more with the other shipgirls on the base. She and the other senior shipgirls attempt to examine the Black Box. When Enterprise touches it, she receives a brief vision what appears to be an alternate version of herself. Returning her attention to the base, Enterprise is surprised at how lively it is with new arrivals like Akashi, Ping Hai, and Ning Hai setting up shops. Belfast reminds Enterprise that shipgirls are humans as well, which is something she must learn to embrace. Javelin and Laffey take a bath with Unicorn at the public bathhouse, who reveals she's self conscious about her large breasts despite her small size. They reassure her that every shipgirl's body is different, and she should be proud of her own. That night, the three of them reaffirm their desire to befriend Ayanami. At the Sakura Empire, Prinz Eugen tries to sow distrust between Kaga and Akagi by suggesting to Kaga that Akagi has differing motives from hers. Akagi meanwhile expresses her desire to reunite with Amagi.
7	"DEADLINE - For Determination, For Love"; Transliteration: "【Shisen】Ketsui to, Ai no Tame ni" (Japanese: 【死線】決意と、愛のために)	Ryūta Yamamoto	Jin Haganeya	November 21, 2019	December 12, 2019
Azur Lane and the Sakura Empire prepare to face each other in a decisive naval battle, sending their largest fleets. Akagi uses a spell to transport the Azur Lane fleet into an otherworldly realm, where they must fight against a combined Sakura Empire and Siren fleet. Enterprise engages Kaga, but is momentarily distracted seeing Belfast in trouble and is knocked out of the sky by Kaga. As she sinks into the ocean, Enterprise has another vision of her alternate self and reawakens in a much more powerful form, easily neutralizing Kaga. Observer watches the battle from a distance, and notes that Enterprise is the "key". Enterprise forcibly transports her and Akagi back to the real world, where she seemingly kills Akagi with a single shot before returning to her senses. Realizing what she's done, Enterprise finally realizes that she's afraid of the ocean. Meanwhile, Akagi is seemingly reunited with Amagi in the afterlife, only to find Amagi has no face as she tells her "it's not over yet."
8	"INTERSECTION - Hold You, Never Let Go"; Transliteration: "【Kōsaku】Dakishimete Hanasanai" (Japanese: 【交錯】抱きしめて離さない)	Hironori Tanaka	Jin Haganeya	November 28, 2019	December 12, 2019
In the aftermath of the battle, the Azur Lane fleet sees numerous portals opening all over the area, with Enterprise missing. Javelin and Laffey are separated from the main fleet and encounter Ayanami again. Before they can come to an understanding, Ayanami's fellow destroyers take her away to safety while Belfast arrives to retrieve Javelin and Laffey. Kaga regains consciousness as the Sakura Empire fleet regroups, but Akagi remains missing and their mass produced sirens are inoperable. Shoukaku begins to openly wonder what secrets Akagi and Kaga have been hiding from them. Realizing they are at a disadvantage without Akagi and the Siren ships, the Sakura Empire fleet decides to retreat while Zuikaku and Shoukaku act as rearguards. Observer and Tester watch from afar, having captured Akagi. Observer reveals that having gathered data from Enterprise, the Black Mental Cube is now complete and ready to activate Orochi. Enterprise then arrives in her berserk state and easily defeats Zuikaku and Shoukaku. Before she can finish them off, Ayanami intervenes, destroying Enterprise's plane which knocks her back to her senses. Javelin and Laffey work together to save Ayanami and prevent her from falling into one of the portals.
9	"HOPE - Light Shines Through The Darkness"; Transliteration: "【Kibō】Kurayami ni Hikari ga Sashikomi" (Japanese: 【希望】暗闇に光が差し込み)	Motoki Nakanishi	Jin Haganeya	December 5, 2019	December 19, 2019
Ayanami wakes up in the Azur Lane base as a prisoner of war. As "punishment" for disobeying orders and saving Ayanami, both Javelin and Laffey are assigned to supervise her. The lead ships discuss the Black Mental Cube's sudden activation, and are concerned about it and its apparent connection to Enterprise. Javelin and Laffey show Ayanami around the base, and Ayanami is caught off guard that none of the Azur Lane shipgirls bear any ill will towards her. She then meets Akashi, who tells her about Akagi's alliance with the Sirens. All the while, Ark Royal quietly observes them from a distance. Meanwhile, the Sakura Empire are reeling from the loss of both Akagi and Ayanami, and Nagato begins to have second thoughts about Project Orochi. Queen Elizabeth wonders what the Sirens' true goal is while Belfast, Illustrious, and Unicorn are confident Enterprise can overcome her inner conflict. Unicorn later joins Javelin, Laffey, and Ayanami. Ayanami begins to realize that the shipgirls of both Azur Lane and the Sakura Empire have many similarities. Observer manipulates Kaga into continuing Project Orochi, claiming that activating Orochi will reunite her with Akagi. That night, Ayanami encounters Enterprise and confides to her that she doesn't have any desire to fight, a feeling that Enterprise also shares. Reuniting with Javelin, Laffey, and Unicorn, Ayanami finally accepts becoming friends with them.
10	"ECHOES - Crimson Memories, Bleached"; Transliteration: "【Zankyō】Hyōhaku Sareshi Kurenai no Kioku" (Japanese: 【残響】漂白されし紅の記憶)	Tenshō	Jin Haganeya	December 12, 2019	January 2, 2020
Enterprise continues to have disturbing dreams of the alternate version of herself while the Azur Lane shipgirls still cannot learn anything about the true purpose of the Black Mental Cube. Ayanami tells her friends she wants to help stop the fighting between Azur Lane and the Sakura Empire, and Javelin, Laffey, and Unicorn agree to help her. At the Sakura Empire, Nagato decides to suspend the Orochi Project despite Kaga's protests, pointing out how they cannot continue without Akagi. Kaga then has a dream where she recalls Amagi passing away and Observer tempting Akagi with the possibility of reviving her with Orochi. Enterprise's dreams intensify, and she comes to realize the vision of herself and Amagi that she has been seeing are in fact illusions created Orochi itself, which claims it is born from humanity's desire for conflict. Belfast then confronts Enterprise, asking her why she continues to fight if she is afraid of the ocean. However, the Siren Purifier attacks the base and steals the Black Mental Cube. The Azur Lane shipgirls, including Enterprise, start a battle with Purifier to recover the Cube. At the Sakura Empire base, Prinz Eugen sneaks into Orochi's harbor in an attempt to steal it, but Kaga activates Orochi and sails it out of the base.
11	"MONSTER - A War to Span Every Ocean"; Transliteration: "【Kaibutsu】Amaneku Umi ni Tatakai o" (Japanese: 【怪物】あまねく海に戦いを)	Yūichirō Aoki	Jin Haganeya	March 13, 2020	August 30, 2020
Despite Azur Lane's best efforts, Purifier manages to escape with the Cube. Observer then uses the Cube to fully activate Orochi. Akagi is apparently revived by Orochi, much to Kaga's relief. As a show of force, Orochi launches a missile that completely destroys an entire uninhabited island. Realizing the danger Orochi poses, both Azur Lane and Red Axis independently mobilize to attack it. Kaga quickly realizes that Akagi is possessed by Orochi, but Orochi torments Kaga by pointing out Akagi only loved her because she inherited some of Amagi's parts. Both the Red Axis and Azur Lane fleets attack Orochi and the Siren fleet, agreeing to work together to fight their mutual foe. Zuikaku and Shoukaku are blocked by Kaga, who is still determined to protect Orochi for Akagi's sake. Ayanami then arrives to battle Kaga. Meanwhile, Enterprise and Belfast fight their way to Orochi, but it prepares to launch another missile as Orochi manipulates Akagi's memories of Amagi.
12	"BLUE WATERS - May the Azure Lanes Bless You"; Transliteration: "【Sōkai】Aoki Kōro ni Shukufuku o" (Japanese: 【蒼海】碧き航路に祝福を)	Tenshō	Jin Haganeya	March 20, 2020	September 6, 2020
Orochi launches the missile at the Azur Lane base, and Enterprise heads off to intercept it despite Purifier's attempts to interfere. She is able to destroy the missile, but is knocked out by the blast. Meanwhile, the Azur Lane and Red Axis fleets attack Orochi as it prepares to fire a second missile. However, Orochi is protected by an impenetrable shield, and the shipgirls are unable to inflict any damage. While unconscious, Enterprise encounters her alternate self again, who warns her conflict between shipgirls is inevitable since they are manifestations of human will like Orochi, but Enterprise decides to continue fighting to protect everybody important to her. As Enterprise rejoins the battle, Zuikaku manages to snap Kaga back to her senses by headbutting her. Enterprise fires a special arrow that pierces Orochi's shield and cripples the ship. The shipgirls rally and begin pushing back the Siren fleet. Enterprise then reaches out to and rescues Akagi, returning her to her sense as well. Orochi fades away and the Sirens withdraw, with Observer noting that even though their plan failed, the shipgirls exceeding their expectations means Humanity still has a future. Afterwards, in order to improve relations, Azur Lane and Red Axis agree to live together in the same base, with shipgirls from both sides mingling with each other. Hornet and Hammann pay a visit to the hospital, only to find an empty bed. They find the person they were going to see, Enterprise and Hornet's elder sister and the leader of the Eagle Union; Yorktown, walking around outside again and healthy again. Z23 joins Ayanami, Javelin, Laffey, and Unicorn's group, while Enterprise is appointed to be the new overall leader of the combined Azur Lane and Red Axis force. While overlooking the ocean, Enterprise is once again approached by her alternate self, who again warns her that conflict between shipgirls is inevitable, and that war never changes. Enterprise counters that even if war doesn't change, people can.

=== Audio CDs ===
A CD featuring character songs sung by their respective voice actors was released in September 2018. A drama CD written by the author of Starting My Life as a Commander with Laffey was released on November 28, 2018.

=== Miscellaneous ===
Azur Lane produces an educational video series hosted on YouTube called Learning Ships of the World with Mikasa Dai-Senpai (ja:三笠大先輩と学ぶ世界の艦船). Hosted by Mikasa, it highlights the real-life characteristics and histories of ships featured in the franchise. In the event that a featured ship still exists as a museum ship, live-action or documentary-style footage may be included. For example, for one of Belfast's episodes, footage was included of Azur Lane management visiting Belfast in the Pool of London in cooperation with Imperial War Museums, which currently operates Belfast as a branch.

== Reception ==
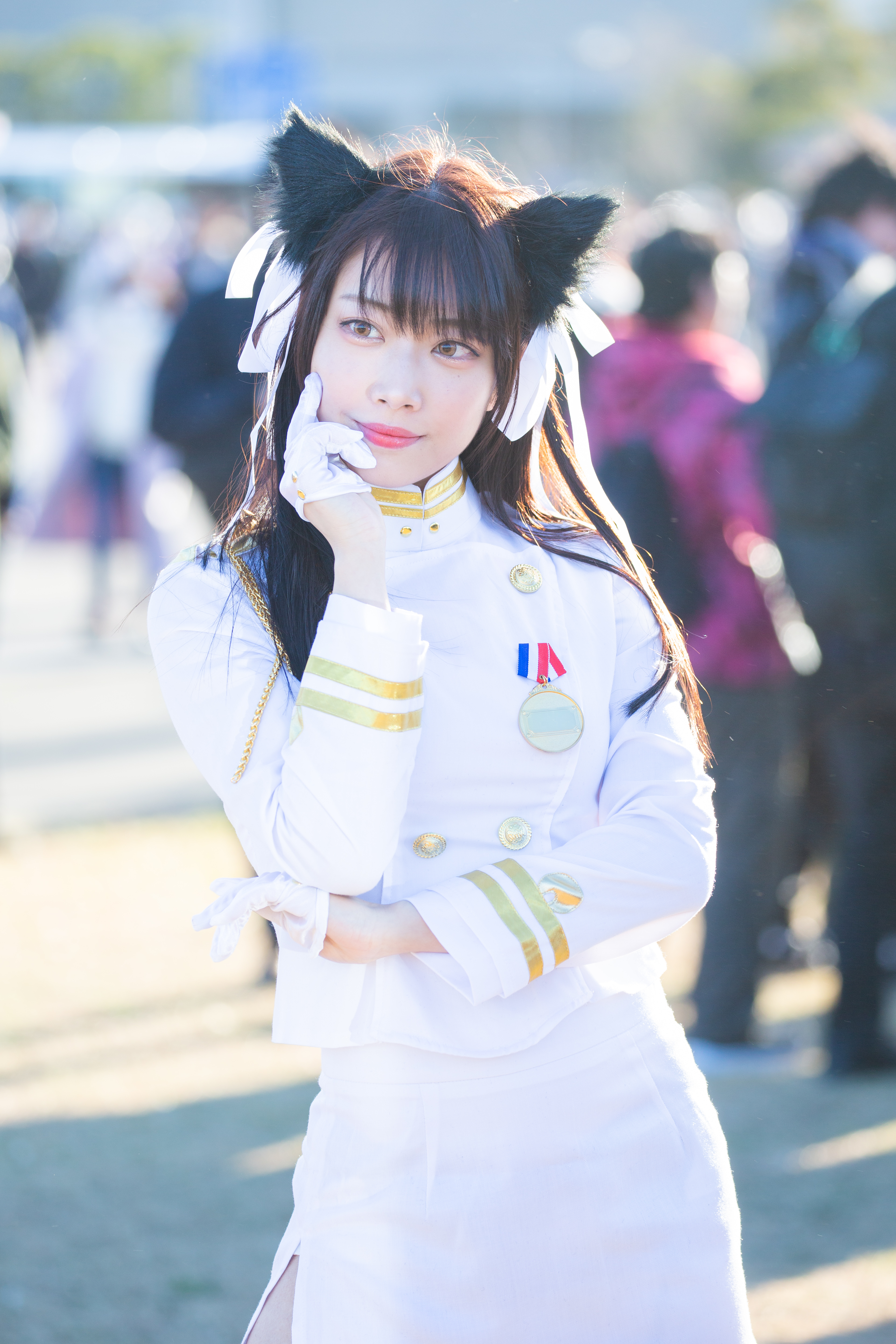
Cosplay of Azur Lane's Atago, based on the Japanese cruiser with that name

Azur Lane was very popular in its home country, contributing to most of Bilibili's 2018 Q1 revenue along with the Chinese release of Fate/Grand Order. In Japan, the game enjoyed an overwhelming surge in popularity after its release, despite initial accusations by fans of Kantai Collection that it was a clone. After only four months, there were more than five million Japanese players. The first doujin convention dedicated exclusively to the game was held in November 2017. From May 2017 to August 2018, the game has earned US$170 million globally on the iOS AppStore. Chinese players spent $28 million, while Japanese players spent $139 million, accounting for approximately 82% of the game's sales.

The game scored within Japan's top five best games of 2017 in a Google Play user vote, as well as a first place in the app section of the Dengeki Online Awards 2017. In September 2018, the game was awarded third place in Game of the Year in the 15th China Animation & Comic Competition.

Azur Lane's popularity was attributed to its gameplay and game system design, which were generally praised. RPG Site wrote the game "acts as an important lesson on how a Chinese-made title can gain popularity in Japan by offering originality in its gameplay". Famitsu liked how the game depended very little on luck, let players develop their own playstyle, and was easy to pick up and play due to few microtransaction elements. Japanese writer, actor and radio personality Mafia Kajita was impressed by the tight shooter controls. He felt the game systems were streamlined and avoided any nuisances, and believes the all-Japanese voice cast is likely a reason for its popularity.

Critics have also compared the game to Kantai Collection. Hong Kong media outlet HK01 found Kantai Collection's complete lack of post-release improvements and overdependence on luck responsible for upsetting its own players, who switched contributing to Azur Lane's popularity. Mafia Kajita noted the two games had different focuses: Kantai Collection is centred on resource management while Azur Lane is a simulation game about dodging danmaku bullets while shooting the enemy. However, Shigetaka Kurita, director of Kadokawa Dwango corporation, criticized Azur Lane for lacking the sense of "tragedy and heroism" in Kantai Collection. Kurita described the game as "merely an idol action game with a fleet motif". He found the greatest appeal of Kantai Collection to be the "sorrow of the Imperial Japanese Navy" saying that one might cry while playing Kantai Collection but not Azur Lane.

=== Controversies ===
In March 2018, Korean players accused Nardack, a guest illustrator in their regional server, of being a radical feminist and alleged that she is a member of Megalia. To this end, the Korean publisher XD Global asked her to publicly announce on her social media that she does not associate with "antisocial groups", and that she does not support feminism. She reportedly declined, and the publisher subsequently removed her artwork in the game. Nardack later criticized and described the publisher's demand as forceful action.

In February 2021, one of the game's voice actresses, Ai Kayano, who recorded voice lines for Kaga, Atago, Renown, and Graf Zeppelin, was embroiled in controversy on Chinese social media as a result of a post regarding her February 11 trip to Yasukuni Shrine – a Shinto shrine often known as a subject of political controversy for the enshrinement of Japanese men, women, children, and soldiers who died in numerous wars involving Japan between the Meiji and Showa eras. This number included 1,068 convicted war criminals sentenced to death by the International Military Tribunal, 14 of whom, including former Japanese Prime Minister Hideki Tojo, are labelled as A-Class criminals. Amid backlash from some Chinese fans, her voice was removed from the Chinese servers of Azur Lane and were replaced in September 2022 by a number of voice actresses for the affected characters (Yuka Iguchi, Saeko Ouki, Ayako Kawasumi, and Yumi Uchiyama). Outside of Chinese servers, the original voice lines remain, with the option to use the updated voice packs.

In April 2021, 18 characters (Note: including: Wichita, Portland, Rodney, South Dakota, Belfast, Sirius, Exeter, Ark Royal, Illustrious, Akagi, Kaga, Yuudachi, Yuubari, Taihou, Hyūga, Fusou, Scharnhorst, and Graf Zeppelin.) were temporarily made unobtainable in the Chinese version of Azur Lane as a result of a Chinese government crackdown on "soft pornography". Coinciding with the removal of revealing artwork in Chinese mobile game Girls' Frontline, both games were specifically named as having inappropriate content in a memo for a state-backed training course for Chinese game developers which included prohibitions on revealing fan service and panty shots. In September, 213 video game companies signed a self-censorship pact agreeing to remove content that would promote the "wrong set of values" and fall foul of Chinese government regulations on gaming.

On February 24, 2022, the comment sections of all Northern Parliament ships were closed down. The game's event called "Abyssal Refrain", which involves Soviet ships like the one called Kiev, premiered on the same day that Russia began its invasion of Ukraine, which was suspected to be the reason for the comments' closure. The Northern Parliament comments were reopened on September 22, in conjunction with the rollout of the new comment reporting feature.

In March 2024, the character Anson was announced. Her official design was met with confusion and backlash from fans due to the fact that it did not match the illustration design of her sisters. In its aftermath, the official Azur Lane Twitter account issued an apology and deleted the announcement post as well as any other posts about Anson from their social media accounts.
