= Naruto Shippuden: Ultimate Ninja Blazing =

2016 mobile video game

- Developer: Shonen Games
- Publisher: Bandai Namco Entertainment
- Series: Naruto: Ultimate Ninja
- Platforms: iOS, Android
- Release: JP: July 14, 2016; NA/EU: August 23, 2016
- Genres: Turn-based strategy, role-playing
- Mode: Single-player

Naruto Shippuden: Ultimate Ninja Blazing (Note: Japanese: NARUTO(ナルト) 疾風伝 ナルティメットブレイジング, Hepburn: Naruto Shippūden Narutimate Blazing) was the first mobile platform game in the Naruto: Ultimate Ninja game series published by Bandai Namco Entertainment. It was a turn-based action role-playing game, and it was available on iOS and Android. The game had a Japanese and English versions.

In April 2017 the game announced 10 million downloads, and a year later, 15 million downloads.

In 2017, the game grossed ¥10.5 billion ($96 million) in China.

It ended service on February 9, 2021.

== Gameplay and content ==
Players engaged in combat by strategically moving their characters. These characters could level up, known as ‘awakening,’ to beat stronger opponents. After that, they could ‘limit break,’ to achieve an even stronger state. The game featured the following playable game modes: Story, Emergency Mission (Missions to get items that improve your characters or new characters), Trial Missions (get Trial Coins to Limit Break characters), Phantom Castle (fight against Teams of other players and ascend to Floor 100), Ninja Road (get an Acquisition Stone to unlock an ability of a character you own by beating all 20 maps in a row), Ninja World Clash (PvP: Build a Team and play against online opponents). The game was free to play and offered in-app purchase.

== Reception ==
Reception

Aggregate score
Aggregator	Score
Metacritic	69/100

The game received "mixed or average" reviews, according to review aggregator Metacritic. Tommaso Pugliese of Multiplayer.it concluded that the game was "a simple but fun turn-based strategy game, with plenty of missions and characters to unlock," awarding it 7.5 out of 10.
