= Shining Nikki =

2020 dress-up mobile game

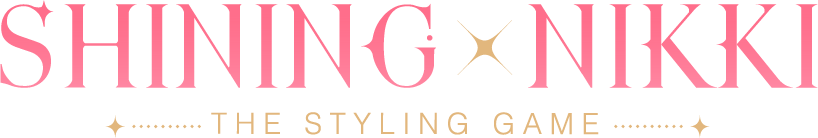
- Developer: Papergames
- Series: Nikki
- Engine: Unity
- Platforms: Android, iOS, Google Play Games (PC)
- Release: CHN: August 6, 2019; KOR: October 29, 2020; JPN: March 18, 2021; WW: July 5, 2021; VIE: October 24, 2023
- Genres: Dress-up, RPG

Shining Nikki is a free-to-play action-adventure dress-up game developed by Papergames. It is the fourth installment in the Nikki series and a sequel to Love Nikki. It was released in China on August 6, 2019, Japan on March 18, 2021, globally on July 5, 2021, and Vietnam on October 24, 2023. It was also released in Korea on October 29, 2020, but was discontinued on November 6, 2020 due to controversy.

== Gameplay ==
Shining Nikki is a dress-up game that is played through styling. In its battle mode, there are five attributes: Sweet, Fresh, Elegant, Sexy, and Cool. The player has to choose clothing with the highest scoring attritbutes to increase their Styling Power in order to win against the opponent. After choosing, the player is directed to select a Designer's Reflection, artwork of different set designers, which each have different skills. After selecting a Designer's Reflection, gameplay of Nikki's outfit is shown, where the player has to press buttons on the corresponding outfit piece that the player has selected. If the player fails to click the button in time, they cannot click it again.

To increase the Styling Power of a Designer's Reflection, the player can go to the Ark. To level up a Designer's Reflection, the player can go to Clock Workshop, where a certain number of exp can be collected depending on the level. A Designer's Reflection also has Stars that correspond with its rank, which can be increased through the use of Memory Keys, which can be collected through Neverfall; Passive Skills, which can be increased with Outfit Crystals, obtained by decomposing extra pieces of clothing the player already owns; and Call of Reflection, a Designer's Reflection's personal skills increased through a specific Designer's Reflection. Designer's Reflections can also be increased through the use of Concepts. Using Concepts from the same series creates resonance.

Styling Power can also be increased by developing a player's bond with Nikki through watching events in the Home and using gifts. In order for Nikki to use gifts, the player has to buy her snacks to increase her vigor.

To obtain clothing, the player can collect from Apple Apparel, where the clothing can be purchased with Gold or Pink Gems; the Gate of Heart, which houses Sea of Fantasy, requiring Fantasy Tickets or Pink Gems, and Sea of Mystery, requiring Mystery Tickets or Gold; and Workshop, where the player has to collect materials from different story stages to craft certain items.

== Development ==
Liu Cong Vasiliy, art director of Papergames considers the material of the clothes to be the most important aspect of the game. After studying physical fabrics, they use Adobe Substance Designer to digitally recreate the textures, a process they find worthwhile given the results. They consider modelling Chinese style embroidery to be the most difficult due to its exquisiteness.

Bro Seal, director of 2D art for the game, describes Shining Nikki as having a vast collection of costume styles and explains how each set is the representation of a character's memory and dedication towards their creation. To make the sets, they settle on a theme, then hire multiple illustrators to decide the details that make up the design. The team picks the best design and translates it into 2D art, eventually being processed to become assets. Along with costume details, fabric texture, and decorative patterns, they are submitted to 3D artists to be adapted as models. Wanting to prioritize creativity, illustrators are provided with the utmost freedom. As Shining Nikki is the first 3D game they have created, the development team found it difficult to create a 3D model and took a whole year to do so. They also found it challenging to model costume designs, picking the Out the Phoenix Palace set as an example due to its intricate details making it difficult to process into a model. Thus, they had to spread the assets into multiple layers.

Animations were added to the game to grant Nikki, who has previously always been a 2D character, a much livelier presence. The team also does research to ensure that Nikki acts as a realistic 19-year-old girl and to let the players know of Nikki's thoughts behind her actions.

3D animations are created through motion capture and post-production. Motion capture actors are provided scripts and given an idea of the actions they should portray for the animations, but are given the freedom to interpret the actions on their own. Papergames originally had 18 actors for Nikki, which they eventually reduced to a single actress who they believe best represents the character.

The game was released in Japan on March 18, 2021 and globally on July 5, 2021.

The game has had collaborations with Neon Genesis Evangelion, Cardcaptor Sakura, Cinderella, Beauty and the Beast, Frozen and Sanrio through the use of the characters My Melody, Cinnamoroll, Kuromi, and Pompompurin.

== Reception ==
Shining Nikki had been downloaded 100 million times worldwide.

TheGamer considers the game to be better than its predecessor, Love Nikki, owing to its newer features and better UI. However, TheGamer has also criticized the game for having too many currencies. Hardcore Droid states the game is rather generous with its free rewards and that despite being a mobile game with lots of spending, it manages to be enjoyable. 4Gamer.net praises the detailed quality of the game's clothing and the story for being more serious than its cheerful appearance would suggest.

=== Closure of the Korean server ===
Following the launch of the game's South Korean servers, Papergames introduced wardrobe items whose cultural provenance sparked controversy, igniting debates over whether the designs were based on hanbok or Ming-style hanfu. This dispute angered both Chinese and Korean player communities. The hanbok-hanfu controversy ultimately triggered a mass exodus of Mainland Chinese players abandoning the game, including long-term heavy spenders and veteran users, culminating in the closure of the Korean servers on November 6, 2020. South Korean politician Lee Sang-heon criticized Papergames' actions in response to their withdrawal from South Korea, stating that they "showed unscrupulous behavior by pouring criticism against Korean users and ending its services in Korea." Lee additionally claimed that Papergames' lack of monetary compensation following its withdrawal violated Korean fair trade laws.

=== Legacy ===
A sequel to the game, Infinity Nikki, was announced on November 29, 2022. It was released on December 4, 2024 in North America, and December 5, 2024 in the U.K., Europe, Japan, and Australia.
