= Yostar =

Chinese video game company

Yostar Games
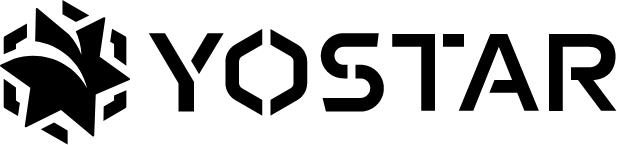
- Native name: 上海悠星网络科技有限公司
- Type: Limited company
- Industry: Video games
- Founded: August 14, 2014; 12 years ago
- Headquarters: Shanghai, China
- Number of locations: 4
- Area served: Worldwide
- Subsidiaries: Yostar Pictures
- Website: www.yo-star.com/en-us/

Yostar Games (Chinese: 悠星) is a Chinese video game development and publishing company founded in 2014. Headquartered in Shanghai, the company has studios in Hong Kong, Seoul and Tokyo.

== History ==
Yostar Games was founded in 2014 in Shanghai, China. It is known for developing and publishing video games such as Azur Lane, Blue Archive, and Arknights. In early 2020, the company expanded its business into the anime industry by establishing Yostar Pictures in Japan.

Since April 2024, Yostar has been a major sponsor of Fuji TV's Wednesday midnight anime block +Ultra, beginning with Viral Hit.

The company published Heaven Burns Red by Key on November 15, 2024, worldwide.

== Games ==
| Original release date | Yostar Release date | Game | Original Developer(s) | Currently as publisher? | Region | Notes |
|---|---|---|---|---|---|---|
| May 25, 2017 | September 14, 2017 | Azur Lane | Shanghai Manjuu, Xiamen Yongshi | Yes | Japan, Worldwide | |
| June 2018 | April 2019 | Mahjong Soul | Cat Food Studio | Yes | Worldwide | |
| 2018 | November 7, 2019 | Epic Seven | Smilegate | No | Japan | Smilegate took over the Japanese release in 2022. |
| May 1, 2019 | January 16, 2020 | Arknights | Hypergryph | Yes (except Taiwan) | Worldwide (except Taiwan) | The Taiwanese release is handled by Gryphline, Hypergryph's global division. |
| July 28, 2020 | October 6, 2021 | Guardian Tales | Kong Studios | No | Japan | Kong Studios took over the Japanese release in 2023. |
| February 4, 2021 | | Blue Archive | Nexon | Yes (in Japan and China only) | China, Japan | Nexon globally self-publishes the game by itself outside Japan and China. |
| February 10, 2022 | November 15, 2024 | Heaven Burns Red | Wright Flyer Studios, Key | Yes | Worldwide | |
| April 22, 2022 | May 23, 2023 | Aether Gazer | Xiamen Yongshi | No | Worldwide | Global publishing rights were fully transferred to Yongshi in 2025 and has been self-published by them since. |
| June 25, 2024 | April 3, 2025 | CookieRun: Tower of Adventures | Devsisters, Oven Games | Yes (in Japan only) | Japan | Devsisters globally self-publishes the game by itself outside Japan. |
| October 20, 2025 | | Stella Sora | Yostar (developed in-house) | Yes | Worldwide | Yostar's first game to be developed completely in-house. |

== See also ==
- Cygames, a similar game publisher based in Japan
- Tencent Games, a similar game publisher also based in China
- Com2uS, a similar game publisher based in South Korea
- Smilegate, another similar game publisher also based in South Korea
