= Brave Frontier =

2013 video game

- Developer: A-Lim
- Publishers: JP: A-Lim; WW: Gumi
- Director: Eiji Takahashi
- Producers: Eiji Takahashi; Hisatoshi Hayakashi
- Artist: Yutaka Ebishima
- Writer: Hiroshi Sasako
- Composer: Hikoshi Hashimoto
- Platforms: iOS; Android; Amazon Kindle Fire; Windows Phone 8 Microsoft Windows
- Release: iOS: JP: July 3, 2013; WW: December 13, 2013; Android: WW: December 13, 2013; Kindle Fire: WW: 2014; Microsoft Windows and Windows Phone: WW: July 2015
- Genre: Role-playing game

Brave Frontier (ブレイブフロンティア, Bureibu Furontia) was a Japanese mobile role-playing game developed and published by A-Lim, originally for Apple's iOS and later for Android and Kindle Fire. It was first released in Japan by A-Lim on July 3, 2013, and later released worldwide by Gumi and managed by 2 locations, Gumi Asia and Gumi Europe.

A sequel game titled Brave Frontier 2 was released only in Japan on February 22, 2018 while a global-exclusive sequel, titled Brave Frontier: The Last Summoner was released on September 17, 2018. The game ended all services across all platforms and regions on April 27, 2022. This decision was made by A-Lim on March 30. A follow-up spin-off title, Brave Frontier Versus, was released worldwide for iOS and Android on October 22, 2025.

== Gameplay ==
Brave Frontier's gameplay is similar to Tri-Ace's Valkyrie Profile. The storyline focuses on the unnamed summoner and players have to complete every stage to access a new area. Players are allowed to bring up to 5 units in each stage with a "friend" unit in quest mode. Players make friends through friend request. Attacking units in a battle rewards the player with Brave Burst Crystals, and Heart Crystals. After an enemy is defeated, the player proceeds the next stage until the boss, which is required to go complete a level. After completing, players are rewarded with Zel, Karma and items, as well as acquiring units from each mission. When players complete the entire area, they'll be rewarded with one gem. However, if players fail a quest, they use one gem to continue. Units have the ability to execute special attacks, known as Brave Bursts. When activated the unit uses a powerful attack. Brave Bursts can also provide a boost in health points or increase the overall stats to gain an advantage against enemies. Super Brave Bursts can also be executed but only if a unit has a 6 Star Rank and maxed out their Brave Burst gauge. Another version, called Ultimate Brave Bursts can be used by 7-Star and Omni Evolution Units after filling the Overdrive gauge. The Omni Evolution units are able to customize their abilities, as well as additions to the effects given from their Brave Burst, Super Brave Burst, and Ultimate Brave Bursts through Enhancements from fusing other units to the Omni Evolution Units. Omni Evolution Units can also do Resonances which requires two of the same element of Omni Evolution units to spark with each other.

Aside from quests, the player can also fuse units with the ones obtained in each mission in order to level them up. Once a unit is now in its max level, is it now capable of evolving. The requirements to evolve eligible units are different. Each unit has their own ranking as well, with the Omni Evolution being the highest. Players can obtain more units through Honor Summons and Rare Summons, they require players to use gems and Honor Points in order to summon units. Players can sell units for zel or equip them Spheres and by Gems through micro transactions. Items can also be synthesized into useful items, such as potions, tonics, and revives. Spheres are also made in the same fashion, to increase a unit's overall stats. The town provides a lot of items used for these, some items must be obtained through dungeons cleared by the player. Another thing is the town can provide more important items if the player upgrade each establishments using karma.

Brave Frontier has event quests available inside the Vortex Gate, allowing players to obtain evolutionary units, Zel or promotional rare units not found in Rare Summons. Certain dungeons, such as Metal Parades, Jewel Parades, and Imp Parades require keys to unlock for a limited time. In-Game Events are in the Vortex Gate, and players will be rewarded with a free unit if completed. Players can challenge each other in the arena and win prizes for attaining a certain rank. The game also features Frontier Hunter trials, allowing players to raise their Hunter Ranks, Raid Battles, a Slot Machine Feature, Mini games, Daily Missions and Grand Quest.

== Story ==
The land of Grand Gaia is a world ravaged by a war between humans and the Gods that took place many years ago. It is a land surrounded by a veil of mystery but engulfed in havoc as certain places have been conquered by four fallen gods, who have betrayed their fellow gods. Amidst the chaos, The Imperial Army of Randall, capital of Elgaia and the Akras Summoners Hall are doing their best to handle the chaos the fallen gods and the demonic legions its causing, but have not been able to push them back. But, amidst the chaos, a god by the name of Lucius summons a hero to liberate Grand Gaia from The Four Fallen Gods.

== Development ==
The game was first announced after the Gaming Company A-Lim was officially registered in March 2013. The company, formed from the combined efforts of Gumi Ventures, B-Dash Ventures, and Fuji Startup Ventures, a company owned by Fuji TV. Hironao Kunimitsu officially stated that the company would have "key advantage over other game-makers in the market." Hisatoshi Hayakashi, the game's executive producer stated that the game was inspired from various RPG games such as Final Fantasy, Valkyrie Profile, Romancing SaGa, Star Ocean and the Tales series; Hayashi explained, "Originally, we wanted to have players walk around towns and dungeons, but then we thought about mobile devices and small screens and suddenly, knowing how far you were into a dungeon was quite scary, and walking in towns was not as enjoyable as it should be. But I am convinced that if we can somehow represent the fact that players are walking around cities and dungeons, talking to people and fighting monsters, all on a mobile device, they will really get into the RPG world."

=== Promotional units ===
Following the game's release, several promotional in-game units were released exclusively in both Japanese and global versions of the game, including crossover units from magazines such as Famitsu and other smartphone games such as Emperors SaGa, Deemo, Puzzle Trooper, Rise of Mana, Secret of Mana, Tales of Link, Rune Story, The King of Fighters, Phantom of the Kill, Shin Megami Tensei IV: Apocalypse, Final Fantasy Brave Exvius, Blazing Odyssey and Crystal of Reunion. The developers also collaborated with other media franchises such as Crypton Future Media's Vocaloid mascot Hatsune Miku the film series The Hobbit and Eagle Talon.

== Release ==
Brave Frontier was released in July 2013 in Japan.

The game, Brave Frontier 2, and Brave Frontier ReXona were shut down with on April 25, 2022.

== Media ==
=== Manga ===
A spin-off manga of the series titled Brave Frontier: Haruto's Summoning Diary (ブレイブ フロンティア ハルトの召喚日記, Bureibu Furontia Haruto no Shōkan nikki) was created by Kiro Sanjou and published by Kadokawa Shoten, serialized in the web comic GAMMA!. Two tankōbon volumes were released on November 14, 2015 and February 15, 2016.

=== Music ===
The game's music was composed by Hikoshi Hashimoto, who once composed music on various Sega games. The game's official soundtrack, titled Brave Frontier: Original Soundtrack (ブレイブ・フロンティア オリジナルサウンドトラック, Bureibu Furontia Orijinaru Saundotorakku) was released in Japan by Sony Music Entertainment Japan on July 23, 2014.

== Reception ==
Gamezebo gave the game a generally positive review, stating that "It's got its heart in the right place aspiring to be like the Final Fantasy or Xenoblade series, but it's still caught up in the platform paradigms we know all too well. In other words, it's fine for its time, just not timeless." The global version of the game became the most downloaded game on both Android and iOS platforms with a total of 10 million downloads as of August 2014.

It currently holds the Guinness World Record for the "Most playable pixel art characters in a mobile game".

== Spin-off ==
- Brave Frontier Versus is a digital trading card game in the Brave Frontier series, released worldwide for iOS and Android devices on October 22, 2025.

== Legacy ==
In 2026, Alim announced Brave Frontier Origin.

== See also ==
- Brave Frontier 2
