= Gacha game =

Video game business model

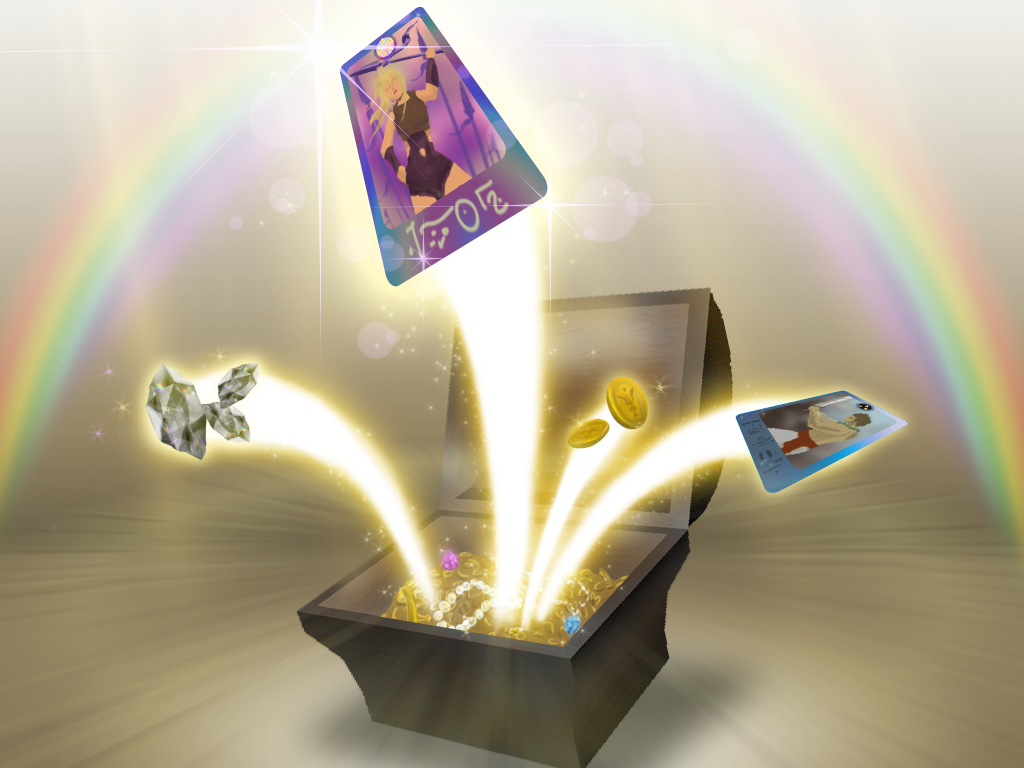
Gacha mechanics have been compared to those of loot boxes.

A gacha (Japanese: ガチャ) game implements mechanics inspired by Gashapon vending machines in a video game. Gacha is derived from the alternative form gachapon. Similar to loot boxes, live service gacha games entice players to spend in-game currency to receive a random in-game item, which is generally seen mechanically central to gameplay. When players decide to purchase this currency with real-world funds to engage with gacha, a game generates revenue.

Most common gacha games are free-to-play (F2P) mobile role-playing video games with an emphasis on strategy, such as team building, synergizing and player improvisation.

The gacha game model has been around since the early 1990s with strategy trading card games such as Magic: the Gathering, but began to be widely used in early 2010s mobile gaming in Japan. Hiromasa Iwasaki, author of the book "History of Video Games" and a former industry insider, explains that the game "Pangya" developed by the Korean company Ntreev Soft and released in 2004 significantly influenced the gacha business model that later became mainstream in Japan. In the game, users could spend paid currency to participate in a lottery style system, through which they could obtain new characters or items such as skins to customize their characters.

Gacha mechanics have become an integral part of Japanese mobile game culture as well as pop culture in general. The game mechanism is also increasingly used in Chinese and Korean games, as well as in European and American games.

Digital gacha games have been criticized for being designed to be addictive in order to attract so-called "whales" (large spenders) to spend money on microtransactions far beyond the usual price of a video game. The typical gacha game format encourages spending real-world money on chance-based loot tables with in-game rewards of differing value instead of individual specific purchases, with comparisons to the business model to gambling.

== Gameplay ==
Due to the randomized nature of gacha games, many original gachas are often strategy games or feature elements of strong strategy considerations, encouraging the player to improvise their own solution to problems while also being attentive about new additions to the roster of obtainable characters/items that can add more flexibility to a player's strategy in late/post-game modes such as boss raids and tower-styled challenge rooms.

In many older games, gacha rewards were essential for players to make progress in the game, although certain newer gacha games allow for more flexibility on progression through core content. While players can earn the "premium" currency during gameplay, it is available in controlled amounts at the developer's discretion, with holidays and special events usually boosting the amounts given.

Banners are "pools" of available items (characters, loot, cards, etc) that players can "roll" on. Offered banners can be perpetually available or can have a limited duration. Games generally have some of both, with player retention efforts and in-game advertising in some games emphasizing the limited availability of some or all of the items in the latter. Many kinds of virtual items can be in the loot table for a banner such as cards, characters, equippable gear, or more abstract loot such as "experience." Sometimes, these banners are limited so that specific prizes can only be obtained within a specific event time-frame. Sometimes, games lift the limited status of certain items to be "commons" or even free, but this is not seen often.

Some gacha games often feature several in-game currencies with intricate conversion methods, obscuring the actual value of non-premium currencies. In some games, players are generally given free or discounted gachas in low amounts on a regular schedule in exchange for logging in or doing in-game tasks.

Because of the nature of the player-developer relationship, the free to play experience is often a case-by-case basis dependent on a developer's attitude towards the development of their game and their player base as well as how well they implement luck mitigation mechanics such as sparking systems that allow the player to obtain the item within a limit, which are also case-by-case implementations of reliability and frequency, assuming they are implemented at all.

== Model ==
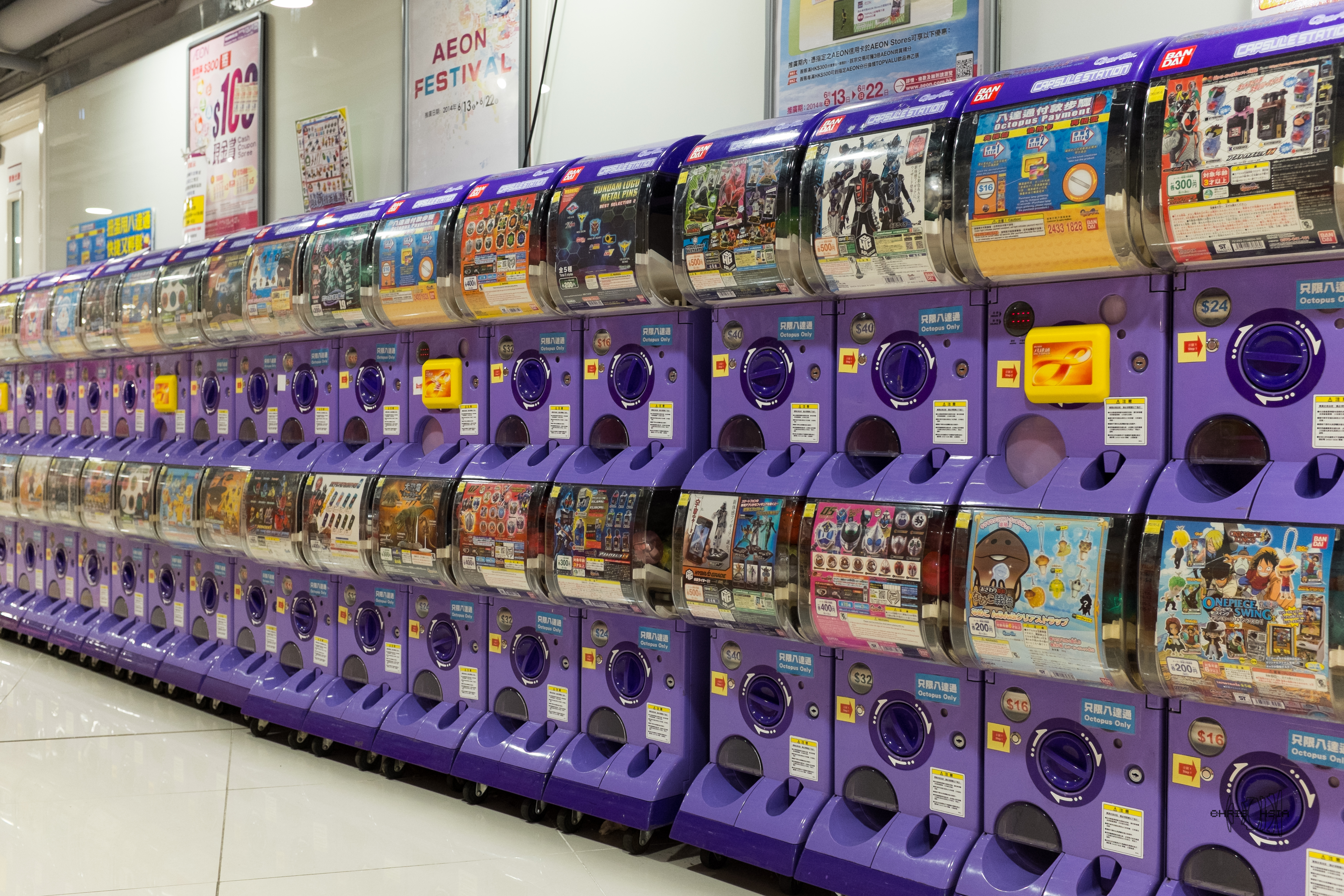
The games are named after gashapon vending machines, which dispense capsules containing randomly-selected toys.

For virtual currency and extra roll deals, gacha games utilize a marketing practice where cheaper "deals" of a product are shown to the consumer so they perceive what they are buying as a "good deal" to get consumers to buy more. Studies show that consumers buy on the basis of the price of a single product and not all of the products prices combined which entrepreneurs take advantage of. Customers only look at the price at hand of a product and compare that to the deal and not the sub charges of the product. Mobile games use cheap products to anchor a player then show deals on the more expensive products, making the player feel better for a purchase because they perceive it as having more value.

To further immerse players, they are rewarded gifts at random intervals throughout the game. This encourages players to either play or else pay to get valuable items. An example of this is getting a free gacha pull by doing certain tasks in the game.

Gacha games often use a 'near miss' technique inspired by gambling, in which the player's pull briefly shows a valuable or rare item before stopping on a different, less desirable one. This gives the player the impression of being close to obtaining their desired item, and that a subsequent pull will result in success. By passing over other potential rewards before stopping on the one the player receives, the game gives the player a sense of having missed out, and encourages them to spend more to obtain rare items.

Some items are only available for a limited amount of time, incentivizing players to directly purchase or otherwise obtain the item for an in-game power advantage or bragging rights. Limited time events can also condition players to consistently play the game out of fear of missing an event or specific item. Daily login rewards can encourage players to open the game each day in order to collect a specific daily reward. Daily play is often exacerbated by a random-number-generator (RNG) system for equipment to strengthen their characters' power and optimize core gameplay, encouraging players to continue playing to reach a higher level.

A gacha game will have collectable characters, cards, or other items. Many of them are obtainable only through a "gacha" mechanic, wherein the player exchanges in-game currency for "pulls" or "spins", each pull yielding a random collectable "drop".

Some of the "drops" drop less frequently than others. As such, drops can often be categorized into rarity "tiers". Historically, gacha games did not always share their drop rates. Those that did so were called "open gacha" and those that did not were "closed gacha". In many jurisdictions it is now legally required for the item rarities to be public information. As such, virtually all contemporary gacha games share this information.

Between rarity and limited-time availability drops, players are incentivized to roll while their desired item is available.

=== Pity system ===
Some gacha games implement safety net mechanics such as "pity" or "sparking" to guarantee a featured item after a specific number of attempts:

- Soft pity increases the base drop rate incrementally after a player reaches a designated pull threshold without receiving a high-rarity item.
- Hard pity guarantees that a high-rarity or featured item will automatically drop once a fixed maximum number of pulls is reached.
- Sparking awards a specialized in-game currency with each pull, allowing players to directly select and purchase a featured banner item once a set total (a "spark") is accumulated.

Because hard pity and sparking mechanisms guarantee an item after a predetermined number of pulls, they function as an effective price ceiling, allowing players to treat the maximum pull threshold as a guaranteed purchase cost by accumulating sufficient currency in advance.

Moreover, some gacha games have implemented a multilayered guarantee system, usually called a 50/50 system, where there is a 50% chance for a player to successfully pull the featured banner character or reward when they pull an item of that rarity. If the player "loses" their 50/50 chance and pulls a character that is not featured, their next rare pull is guaranteed to be the featured character.

== Variations ==
This is a list of game mechanics that may be used in a game's implementation of gacha mechanics. Some mechanics are nearly or entirely obsolete due to regulatory requirements.

Complete gacha
"Complete gacha" (コンプリートガチャ), also shortened as "kompu gacha" or "compu gacha" (コンプガチャ), is a monetization model popular in Japanese mobile video games until 2012, when it was made illegal by Japan's Consumer Affairs Agency. In this scheme, there are desirable items that cannot be rolled for directly. The player must collect (that is, pull) a specific set of other items, and upon completion they unlock the desirable item. The first few items in a set can be rapidly acquired but as the number of missing items decreases it becomes increasingly unlikely that redeeming a loot box will complete the set (see coupon collector's problem) since eventually one single, specific item is required.

Box gacha
Box gacha is "pulling, without replacement". There is a slate of items in the box or banner, in specific quantities rather than via "with replacement", each-roll-is-independent probability. Over successive rolls, the set of possible "draws" shrinks until the player has all of the items.
Redraw gacha
Redraw gacha allows the player to "re-roll": to give up the rolled item in exchange for another roll and so a chance at a different result. the gacha, returning their drawn item in exchange for another opportunity to draw, so as to potentially get something else. Some games offer this feature for free. Games commonly offer some free rolls at the start, e.g. during a tutorial. Players might "re-roll" by creating new accounts and doing the starter rolls on each until they get the draws they want.
Consecutive gacha
Consecutive gacha improves the chances of receiving rare rewards when the player spends in bulk. As opposed to spending a set amount for individual rolls, a player can spend a larger amount in order to roll several times in a row for a slightly discounted price.
Step-up gacha
The player's rates are improved for each consecutive roll or instance of spending within a single session or a limited time period (e.g. five checkpoints; must roll five times or spend five times within half an hour to get the rewards for step one, two, three, four, and five in succession.)
Open versus closed gacha
Gacha that show (open) versus hide (closed) the exact probabilities of pulling rare items.

== Appeal ==
Game developers have praised gacha as a free-to-play monetization strategy. Most developers that work primarily with free-to-play games recommend it be incorporated into the game starting with the concept for maximum monetization potential.

It has been debated what makes gacha so addictive to so many players. Proposed mechanisms include playing on the hunter-gatherer instinct to collect items, as well as the desire to complete a set, effective use of the "fear of missing out", or, simply the same mechanisms that drive gambling. Additionally, the pity systems in gacha games may lead to a feeling of entrapment, where players may feel psychologically and financially obligated to continue sinking both time and money into gacha rolls because they have gone too deep to give up. Some gacha games appeal to players by utilizing existing intellectual property to tap into a pre-existing fanbase that is already invested in a franchise and its characters, inducing feelings of nostalgia and attachment. Some examples of this include Fate/Grand Order, Jujutsu Kaisen: Phantom Parade, Persona 5: The Phantom X, Star Trek: Fleet Command, and Dragon Ball Z: Dokkan Battle.

The model of gacha has been compared to that of collectible trading card games as well as to gambling.

An aspect of monetization commonly found in the financing of gacha games involves a model where a large part of the game's revenue comes from a very small proportion of players who spend an unusually large amount of money on gacha rolls, essentially to subsidize the game for other players who may spend smaller amounts of money, or even free-to-play players that spend no money at all. The high-spending players are often colloquially referred to as "whales". A player who is called a dolphin spends a moderate amount of money on microtransactions in mobile games. A player who is called a minnow spends little to no money on microtransactions in mobile games.

=== Parasocial appeal ===
One psychological aspect of the appeal of gacha games is emotional attachment to different characters within the game as they are marketed to the player. Characters are shown with distinct personalities, backstories, animated cutscenes and unique traits to motivate players to "collect" and connect with these characters instead of simply using them for gameplay. In this way, players can form almost parasocial relationships with characters as gacha games utilize a character-centric narrative to enhance the value of new characters and develop a sense of emotional investment within the player. Players also spend time developing emotional intimacy with characters bolstered through in game-progression and even use the phrase "coming home" when successfully pulling a character to highlight a sense of exclusive ownership of said character.

== Criticism and regulation ==
Gacha games have faced significant criticism for their resemblance to gambling, largely due to their reliance on chance-based mechanics to acquire desirable in-game items. Studies in Europe and the United States indicate that a substantial portion of young players who engage in gacha games develop gambling-like behaviors. For instance, research has shown that over 50% of juveniles who participate in gacha games exhibit some gambling tendencies, with around 5% developing problematic habits and 10% showing early signs of gambling addiction.

Some researchers and policymakers argue that gacha monetization systems may take advantage of players who are susceptible to addictive behaviors. The European Union Parliament has taken steps to regulate gacha mechanics to protect consumers, citing the exploitative nature of these games. Some countries like China require companies to disclose the probabilities of obtaining specific items.

Studies suggest that players with existing gambling problems are more likely to spend large amounts of money on gacha systems. Researchers have also noted that the absence of spending limits in many gacha systems may contribute to higher spending among at-risk players. Some studies estimate that a significant share of revenue from gacha and loot box systems comes from players categorized as being at moderate to high risk for gambling-related harm.

Legal classification varies by jurisdiction. Some regulators do not consider gacha mechanics to be gambling. For example, the UK's legal framework does not classify gacha as gambling since the virtual items obtained do not have real-world monetary value. However, the Netherlands Gambling Authority and the Belgium Gaming Commission view gacha as gambling due to its reliance on chance and the potential for items to be traded for real money on third-party sites.

Research has linked the appeal of gacha mechanics to psychological responses associated with randomness, reward anticipation, and variable-ratio reinforcement. Studies comparing gacha systems to gambling note that the anticipation of obtaining rare items can produce responses similar to those observed in traditional gambling contexts. Some gacha implementations have been described as "pay-to-win" by players and critics, while others offer optional purchases that do not substantially affect progression. The impact on players largely depends on how the developers implement the gacha mechanics and whether they are essential for game progression or merely provide optional enhancements.

In response to growing concerns, some jurisdictions have implemented regulations requiring transparency in drop rates and banning particularly exploitative practices. Gacha systems remain a widely used and commercially successful monetization model in mobile games.

One recent instance of implemented jurisdiction is the HoYoverse v. Federal Trade Commission (FTC) case filed after a complaint submitted by the Department of Justice that asserted that HoYoverse deliberately obscured actual in-game purchases and genuine lootbox odds from their younger players of the gacha game Genshin Impact, partaking in dark-pattern strategies. The FTC stated that HoYoverse had violated the Children's Online Privacy Protection Act (COPPA) by knowingly collecting and using minors' personal information without parental authorization. HoYoverse was ordered to pay a $20 million settlement and adjust in accordance with the complaints.

=== Religious perspectives ===
In Islamic financial jurisprudence, the random nature of acquiring in-game items within gacha games which can not be determined to meet the buyer's needs (gharar) can be seen as matching the criteria of gambling (maisir), and are compared to the nature of lootboxes.

== See also ==
- List of gacha games
