= The Adventures of Elliot: The Millennium Tales =

2026 video game

- Developers: Square Enix; Claytechworks
- Publisher: Square Enix
- Director: Shota Fukebaru
- Producers: Naofumi Matsushita; Tomoya Asano
- Designer: Naoki Ikushima
- Artists: Naoki Ikushima; Hajime Onuma
- Writer: Naoki Yamamoto
- Composers: Yuto Moritani; Tomohiro Nakamachi
- Engine: Unreal Engine 5
- Platforms: Nintendo Switch 2; PlayStation 5; Windows; Xbox Series X/S
- Release: June 18, 2026
- Genre: Action role-playing
- Modes: Single-player, multiplayer

The Adventures of Elliot: The Millennium Tales (Note: Japanese: 冒険家エリオットの千年物語, Hepburn: Bōken-ka eriotto no Chitose monogatari) is an action role-playing game developed by Square Enix and Claytechworks and published by Square Enix. It follows the adventurer Elliot as he travels through time to save his kingdom from various perils, while helping other people he meets and befriends along the way. The game was released for Nintendo Switch 2, PlayStation 5, Xbox Series X/S, and Windows on June 18, 2026.

== Gameplay ==
According to head developer Tomoya Asano, The Adventures of Elliot will have "simple and easy to understand gameplay". Unlike previous HD-2D titles, the game does not feature turn-based combat or a party system. Instead, the player fights enemies in real-time combat using seven different weapon types, such as swords, bows, chains, and sickles with different abilities and effects. A second player can control Faie in co-op mode, aiding in battle with her own combat abilities, retrieving items and helping in navigating puzzles and platforming sections. Elliot has a dash and a warp which lets the player instantly teleport to Faie's location. Players can utilize Elliot's shield to block and parry enemy attacks and detonate bombs to unlock doorways in walls. Players can equip Elliot with two weapons at any given time and freely switch between them in battle. Treasure chests in dungeons and puzzle shrines contain magicite fragments that can be used to enhance weapons with various additional effects.

== Story ==
=== Setup ===
The game is set in Philabieldia, a continent overrun by beast tribes. The continent's human history is divided into distinct Ages: the "Age of Myth", that has little information because it precedes written records, the "Age of Budding", where mankind learned magic to defend against the beast tribes, the "Age of Magic", where human civilzation flourished with the development of magic, but misused it and fell into decline, the "Age of Reconstruction", when a leader known as the "Hero King" rallied the human population and established the Kingdom of Huther, the last bastion of humanity, and the current "Age of Safekeeping", where the humans live safe inside the kingdom's walls thanks to a protective magic spell, currently being maintained by Princess Heuria.

=== Plot ===
Elliot is an adventurer tasked to explore some newly discovered ruins under orders of King Hichard. In the ruins, he discovers a door leading to the past. Minister Kaifried, an aide to the king, passes through the door ignoring orders and Elliot is tasked to chase after him. When Elliot locates the minister, he finds him in possession of a powerful magic sword, the "Leytstaf". Elliot confronts Kaifried but is overpowered and killed. He is rescued by Faie, a fairy with no memories of her past that revives him and becomes his traveling companion. Upon returning to the castle, Elliot learns about an ancient magic shield that belonged to Huther's royalty, the "Moonmirror". Elliot retrieves the shield and restores it with the help of Māo, a member of the elusive Myū race of magical cat people. Armed with the shield, Elliot defeats Kaifried who refuses to surrender and falls to his death. Back to the present, Elliot learns that Heuria was afflicted by a curse that encases her into ice.

Elliot returns to the past looking for clues and discovers that the curse is similar to a powerful sealing magic used by the Myu to imprison Demise, an ancient dragon who once tried to destroy the world. Upon further investigation, he also discovers that the Myū who sealed Heuria was no other than Māo, who fell into despair with news that her husband, a human called Carter and their son were killed by humans, thus seeking to enact vengeance on humanity. However, Elliot saves Carter in the past, who takes his son through the door of time to the present 20 years ago and was in comatose state since then. When Carter finally awakens, Elliot discovers that he is the child of Māo and Carter who was raised in an orphanage since his rescue.

The game has three endings. In the "Bronze Ending", Elliot slays Māo, and Heuria is broken free, but remains uncounscious and he begins a journey to look for a way to fully restore her. In the "Silver Ending", Elliot uses a sealing technique with Leytstaf to imprison Māo in ice instead and Heuria fully recovers, but he is forbidden by the king from continuing his explorations through time. In the "Gold Ending" which is the game's true ending, Elliot confronts his mother and manages to have her recover her senses, lifting the curse on Heuria and reuniting his family. However, Faie remembers her original mission which was to warn everybody about the imminent return of Demise. The Myū and human populations combine their magic power to awaken the phoenix Credel, who was resting in a volcano since their fight with Demise in the past. With Credel and Faie's help and empowered by Māo and Huria's magic, Elliot destroys Demise for good. It is then revealed that Faie was created by Elliot from the future with Credel's power and sent back in time in order to change history and prevent Demise from destroying the world. Faie choses to remain with present Elliot instead of returning to the future. The humans and Myū start cohabitating in peace, while Elliot lives happily with his family, friends, and budding romance with Princess Heuria who is now adventuring with him.

== Development and release ==
The Adventures of Elliot: The Millennium Tales was developed by Team Asano and Claytechworks under the umbrella of Square Enix's Creative Studio 5. Like previous titles created by Team Asano, such as the Octopath Traveler series and Live A Live, the game features Square Enix's trademarked HD-2D art style.

The game was announced with a 2026 release date in a Nintendo Direct livestream on July 31, 2025. A free demo for the game featuring approximately 90 minutes of gameplay launched on the Nintendo Switch 2 eShop the same day. Square Enix invited people to provide feedback through an online survey open until September 30.

== Reactions ==
Following the game's announcement, The Adventures of Elliot has been compared to The Legend of Zelda series and various titles developed by Square Enix. The Punished Backlog compared the game's "colorful" and "flashy" real-time combat to the Mana series. Quinton O'Connor of TheGamer noted that Elliot bears a "hilarious" similarity to red mages from the Final Fantasy series and pointed out that the word "magicite" is also used in the series. Gameplay was compared to 2D The Legend of Zelda games like Link's Awakening and Echoes of Wisdom by James Galizio from RPG Site. Particularly, The Adventures of Elliot contains caves, dungeons, and shrines, which increase your maximum health upon completing them with your fairy companion; Galizio likened Elliot's combat, using a basic sword and shield, bow, and bombs to Zelda games of the Game Boy era. Orpheus Joshua of Noisy Pixel described the game as a fusion between the Mana series and Nihon Falcom games from the Ys, Zwei, and Nayuta series. Bruno Yonezawa of Screen Rant calls it a spiritual successor to Chrono Trigger; both Joshua and he call The Adventures of Elliot their most anticipated game of 2026.

The game's fictional continent Philabieldia caused viewers of the Nintendo Direct to make humorous remarks about its nominal similarity to Philadelphia.

== Reception ==
Reception

Aggregate scores
Aggregator	Score
Metacritic	(Switch 2) 79/100 (Note: Based on 40 reviews) (PC) 78/100 (Note: Based on 19 reviews) (PS5) 82/100 (Note: Based on 40 reviews) (XSXS) 76/100 (Note: Based on 4 reviews)
OpenCritic	82% recommend (Note: Based on 137 reviews)

Review scores
Publication	Score
IGN	8/10
PC Gamer (US)	76/100
RPGamer	4/5

The Adventures of Elliot received "generally favorable" reviews according to review aggregator website Metacritic, while 82% of critics recommended the game, according to OpenCritic.

RPGamer's Imani Jones scored the game 4 out of 5, praising its HD-2D visuals, rewarding exploration, and Magicite customization system, and singling out the bosses as consistently excellent. They considered limited enemy variety the game's most noticeable flaw and found the soundtrack pleasant but unmemorable, a shortcoming they felt stood out more than usual for a Square Enix RPG.

Scott White of IGN rated the game an 8/10, calling it a "great action-adventure game" that "isn't without blemishes". White complimented the game for its HD-2D art style and RPG elements but noted that monster varieties and the environment felt "a bit repetitive".

Baxter Burchill of PC Gamer gave The Adventures of Elliot a 76/100 rating, noting its resemblance to classic top-down adventure series like The Legend of Zelda, Ys, and Illusion of Gaia. Burchill wrote that at its best the game could be "positively exhilarating, a total high-octane thrill ride", but took issue with Elliot's fairy companion Faie for being too talkative and faulted the puzzles and dungeons for lacking depth and identity. Faie also drew heavy criticism from TheGamer's Ryan Thompson-Bamsey, who described her as "the worst part of this experience by far" and criticized her "obnoxious" voice and constant commentary. He gave the game four out of five stars, highlighting its boss fights, time-travel mechanic, and likeable cast of characters.
