= Zwei =

Zwei (German: "two") may refer to:

- Zwei (band), a Japanese duo band
- ZWEI, a text editor
- Zwei: The Arges Adventure, 2001 video game
- Zwei: The Ilvard Insurrection, 2008 video game
- Zwei, a team in the Infinite Ryvius anime series
- Zwei, a character in Phantom of Inferno anime series
- Zwei, a Pembroke Welsh Corgi in the anime series RWBY.
- Project Zwai, the codename for the video game The Evil Within
