= Primrose Azelhart =

- Primrose, as she appears in Octopath Traveler
- First game: Octopath Traveler (2018)
- Voiced by: EN: Laura Post; JA: Houko Kuwashima

Primrose Azelhart (Japanese: プリムロゼ・エゼルアート, Hepburn: Purimuroze Ezeruāto) is a fictional character in the 2018 video game Octopath Traveler, where she serves as one of its eight protagonists. She was designed by character designer Naoki Ikushima, and is a dancer seeking information about the murder of her father and the fall of House Azelhart, a quest that takes her to various locations across the world.

Primrose was one of the first characters introduced, alongside Olberic, in Octopath Traveler's demo, and was intended to have a more heavy and adult story, with her writer, Kakunoshin Futsuzawa, using Game of Thrones as a basis. A character in Octopath Traveler II, Agnea Bristarni, was designed to be a dancer whose disposition is "cheerful and sunny" to contrast Primrose.

== Concept and creation ==
Primrose was created for the 2018 video game Octopath Traveler, designed by character designer Naoki Ikushima and written by Kakunoshin Futsuzawa. She is a dancer who is seeking information on and revenge for the murder of her father. Primrose is described by sound producer Yasunori Nishiki as having a femininity that exudes sadness and melancholy. Primrose's story is themed around revenge, but the creators wanted to create a sense of wistfulness as well for her music theme. They added metallic sounds to the theme to represent a desert setting. Futsuzawa wrote her scenario to be heavy and adult, having watched Game of Thrones, making Primrose a character who emphasizes both her feminine charm and strength in the face of human filth. She and fellow Octopath protagonist Olberic were made playable in the first demo due to their relative proximity to other characters and for them showing the appeal of the game's mechanics best. She was one of the game's earliest characters created, and she went through a number of different scenarios, including one where she was a female soldier named Shannon. Octopath Traveler II introduces a Dancer character named Agnea Bristarni, who Ikushima intentionally gave a "cheerful and sunny disposition" to contrast Primrose's "dark past." She is voiced by Laura Post in the English version of Octopath Traveler.

== Appearances ==
Primrose appears in Octopath Traveler, as one of eight characters that players can choose to select from the start. If they do not select her to start, they must later recruit her. Her story sees her pursuing the men responsible for the murder of her father in Noblecourt, leading her to search for them, her only knowledge being a crow tattoo on different parts of their bodies. She worked as a dancer during her search, enduring the abuse of her master, Helgenish, until she finally sees one of the men she was hunting. She attempts to pursue him, with her friend Yusufa distracting Helgenish so she could do so. She sees Helgenish accept a map from the man, pursuing them, only to find Helgenish, who murders Yusufa in front of her. Primrose kneels before Yusufa as she dies, and proceeds to kill Helgenish before taking the map and leaving to pursue the man in Stillsnow.

When she arrives in Stillsnow, she finds a former worker of House Azelhart, Arianna, who became a prostitute due to its fall. She is able to find the man named Rufus before exacting revenge, with Rufus telling her to go to Noblecourt to find the truth. In Noblecourt, she reunites with various former members of House Azelhart, including Simeon and Revello, who aide her in her search for the second man. They ultimately discover that the second man was Albus, a captain thought to have died, whom she exacts revenge upon. However, Simeon stabs her, revealing himself to be the third man, leaving her to die; however, Revello saves her life. Primrose pursues Simeon into Everhold, where she finds a play prepared by Simeon to mock Primrose's life. She moves past it before finding Simeon; he attempted to dissuade her revenge, but she kills him, fully exacting her revenge. She visits her father's grave, not sure what to do with her life now, but decides to continue dancing. During the postgame story, she follows her fellow travelers to the Gate of Finis to battle Galdera and rescue Kit.

Primrose, along with Olberic, appears in Final Fantasy Record Keeper. Primrose returns as an extra superboss on Octopath Traveler II alongside the other travelers of the first game. She is fought alongside Therion, H´aanit, and Cyrus, and can be fought after the player completes the main game. Square Enix is scheduled to release Primrose's figurine on 29 March 2027.

== Reception ==
Primrose has received mixed reception, though she was popular among players. Her theme song was the most popular of the music in Octopath. Some critics, such as Mat Smith of Engadget, found her story the highlight of the game, while others, such as Kirk Hamilton of Kotaku felt it was clichéd. Brittany Vincent of SyFy Wire praised Primrose for her "unique" personality and storyline. Famitsu writer Nishikawa-kun exclaimed that they initially went with Primrose because of her sex appeal, though they regretted choosing her for such a reason after they experienced her storyline, which they compared to a "dark shounen manga." They liked Primrose's mixture of femininity, coldness, and sweetness. Siliconera writer Jenni Lada found parallels between Primrose and Ophilia, particularly in how their similar past yet differing circumstances inform how they interact with others. Lada points out how Ophilia, having been raised in a nurturing environment, has gameplay mechanics built around nurturing others, while Primrose, lacking that environment, has mechanics built around using people.

The Gamer writer Stephanie Minor was drawn to Primrose's route due to the revenge aspect and the antagonist; however, she eventually felt that it was more style than substance, feeling that the antagonist twist lacked weight since the character was not introduced until later, and that Primrose didn't develop much by the end of the story. She compared the story negatively to Alfyn's, who she argued has his beliefs challenged, which in turn makes players question their own beliefs. Game Rant writer Devin Friend discussed how Primrose was the "coldest" character besides perhaps Therion, and how this contrasts with Agnea Bristarni, the Dancer from Octopath Traveler II, who is much happier. He added that they both differed in terms of gameplay and stories.

Primrose has been criticized as oversexualized, with Edwin Evans-Thirlwell of Eurogamer regarding her gameplay mechanic of seducing people to help her in battle to be problematic due to Primrose's backstory of misogyny and sex trafficking. Jess Joho called her a "grotesque cliche," criticizing the writers for using "women's trauma to give a thin character some semblance of personality or depth," while noting that this element is forgotten during lighthearted moments. Joho also finds issue with the relative darkness of her story compared to the relatively "rosy" stories of everyone else. Eurogamer writer Hirun Cryer criticized the handling of Primrose, discussing how Octopath "repeatedly screamed" through her about how women are sexualized and abused in the world, saying that the series treats women in an "unnecessarily nasty" way.
