= Final Fantasy Resonance =

2026 video game

- Developers: Lancarse; Square Enix
- Publisher: Square Enix
- Director: Hiroto Furuya
- Producer: Keisuke Nakashima
- Artist: Masahiro Saitou
- Writer: Yukinori Kitajima
- Composer: Noriyasu Agematsu
- Series: Final Fantasy
- Engine: Unreal Engine 5
- Platforms: Nintendo Switch; Nintendo Switch 2; PlayStation 5; Windows; Xbox Series X/S
- Release: 22 October 2026
- Genre: Role-playing
- Mode: Single-player

Final Fantasy Resonance is a 2026 role-playing video game co-developed by Square Enix and Lancarse and published by Square Enix. It is an adaptation of the 2015 mobile game Final Fantasy Brave Exvius's first story arc, "Lapis." It is the first HD-2D game in the Final Fantasy series and a commemoration of the franchise's 40th anniversary.

The game was released on 22 October 2026 for Nintendo Switch 2, Nintendo Switch, PlayStation 5, Windows, and Xbox Series X/S. A demo was released on 3 September 2026 that covers the entirety of chapter 1, with save data carrying over to the full release.

== Gameplay ==
Final Fantasy Resonance is a role-playing game with traditional turn-based combat, rather than the ATB system from previous installments in the franchise. Each of the main party members have predefined roles and specialities, such as the main character Rain focusing on physical and fire attacks, Lasswell focusing on ice attacks, and Fina focusing on light-based attacks and white magic. Enemies can be stunned by depleting a stagger bar, achieved by dealing damage and targeting enemy weaknesses. If an enemy is staggered, the party member who triggered the effect will receive an extra turn. Upon staggering all enemies in a battle, a "sweeping stagger" state is achieved and every active party member gets an extra turn. Characters can also perform "Limit Bursts," special moves that become available if the party sustains enough damage during a battle.

During battles, players will be able to summon "Visions," phantoms of iconic characters from across the Final Fantasy series, to gain additional abilities. Each Vision has their own elemental alignment and combat specialty, such as Cloud from Final Fantasy VII granting enhanced physical attacks and lightning magic, Y'shtola from XIV offering enhanced magic and supportive abilities, or Clive from XVI providing enhanced fire and stagger capabilities. Visions are usually obtained by discovering shrines in the overworld, wherein the player must answer a series of questions based on the character and story they came from. As characters utilize Visions in battle, they will gain Vision Mastery levels which will award the corresponding party member a new passive buff or skill upon reaching a certain amount. Some of these benefits are perks that can be equipped on that character even when using a different Vision, and others are permanent stat boosts like additional health and magic points. There are more than 20 Visions obtainable in the game, with 16 of them being starring characters from each mainline Final Fantasy title up to that point. Additionally the main villain of Final Fantasy VII, Sephiroth, makes an appearance as an optional superboss and unlockable Vision. Other combat challenges include various caves peppered around the world map housing particularly strong monsters, a colosseum with increasingly difficult rounds of fights, and the Chamber of Arms which is an optional dungeon with several combat gauntlets awarding some of the strongest equipment in the game. Lastly, the character Fina can harness the power of Espers, which are powerful classic Final Fantasy summons like Ramuh and Shiva, to temporarily aid the party in battle after recruiting them. They act automatically for three turns before unleashing a powerful finishing move and departing until summoned again.

Outside of combat, the player can partake in various activities and Sub Quests around the game world. Activities include jumping rope for a high score and collecting Tablet Shards to trade for rewards. Sub Quests are side stories that are usually requested by various NPCs throughout the game. These tasks range from defeating a specific unique monster, talking to certain NPCs, collecting a certain amount of materials, investigating certain areas on the world map, or any combination of the above. Rewards include exclusive Visions based on characters from Brave Exvius, Magicite crystals to upgrade Visions, unique gear and equipment not found in shops, and character-building scenes with main party members or side characters.

== Plot ==
The story takes place in the world of Lapis and centers on Rain (Nobuhiko Okamoto / Clifford Chapin), Lasswell (Yusuke Kobayashi / Alejandro Saab), and Fina (Akane Fujita / Lizzie Freeman), as they set out to protect the remaining crystals across the world after the Earth Crystal is destroyed by Umbra, known as Veritas of the Dark (Akio Otsuka / Ian Sinclair), and his guild of armored warriors called the Sworn Six.

== Development ==
We've been developing the game in hopes players will tell us, "This is the Final Fantasy we've been waiting for." Including its scenario, FFBE is packed with elements that make it worthy of calling it "The Final Fantasy" – and our adaptation of that for consoles is Final Fantasy Resonance.

— Keisuke Nakashima, associate producer of Final Fantasy Brave Exvius and producer of Final Fantasy Resonance.

The game is based on the first story arc of the mobile game Final Fantasy Brave Exvius, which ran from 2015 until 2025. The idea for a console adaptation was pitched by that game's associate producer, Keisuke Nakashima, to Square Enix in 2020. He understood after going on press tours around the world that many potential players were uninterested or simply unwilling to try out Brave Exvius due to its gacha game design. He also personally felt it was high time to create a console Final Fantasy game with turn-based combat and high-quality cinematic pixel art. While he was appreciative of the newer action-oriented Final Fantasy games coming out, he acknowledges that these games demand a certain level of reflexes from the player. To that end, he desired to create a game where players would have to sit down and think deeply about their team builds and party composition, as well as to satiate fans who desired a more classic Final Fantasy experience. There was initial resistance from the executives at Square Enix, expecting the project to be little more than a straightforward port of the mobile game. However Nakashima objected to this, saying he wanted to go all out for this title in order to make it a console-worthy experience. The project was formally approved by the company in 2020.

From this pitch, a small portion of the Brave Exvius team began prototyping for this potential console adaptation. For the first few years of development, they were prototyping different art styles for the game. Ultimately they settled on the "HD-2D" aesthetic, which by that point had become an established fixture in the company's portfolio since the original Octopath Traveler in 2018. In addition to the HD-2D graphical style, the Resonance team also sought guidance from Team Asano, the Square Enix subdivision responsible for producing the Octopath Traveler series, who gave them crucial tips such as writing compelling backstories for the main characters and maintaining consistent attention to detail in locations like the Dwarven Forge, which feature smaller tables and furniture. For gameplay changes, a more conventional overworld map was included, along with a myriad of side quests, optional minigames like jumping rope akin to Final Fantasy IX, and a colosseum with several difficulty levels of monsters to fight through. The "chain" system from Brave Exvius was removed in favor of a more conventional turn-based battle system with a "stagger" mechanic for combat, something that has been regularly seen in mainline Final Fantasy titles since XIII. The central game mechanic of "Visions" was reworked from its gacha game origins to more closely resemble a Job system from titles like Final Fantasy V, and the Vision characters themselves are now represented as phantoms that the main party members can equip to augment their abilities. The mobile game also featured collaboration characters such as 2B from the Nier series, Sora from the Kingdom Hearts series, and celebrity cameos such as Ariana Grande and Katy Perry. All non-Final Fantasy guest characters were removed in the transition to Resonance.

== Music ==
The original soundtrack for Final Fantasy Resonance was released on 28 October 2026. It consisted of 87 tracks previously featured in Final Fantasy Brave Exvius alongside 33 new tracks by returning composer Noriyasu Agematsu.

== Reception ==
Reception

Aggregate scores
Aggregator	Score
Metacritic	(NS2) 82/100 (PC) 80/100 (PS5) 85/100 (XSXS) 86/100
OpenCritic	92% recommend

Review scores
Publication	Score
Destructoid	8/10
Eurogamer	3/5
Game Informer	9/10
GameSpot	7/10
GamesRadar+	4/5
Hardcore Gamer	4/5
IGN	8/10
Nintendo Life	8/10
Nintendo World Report	10/10
PCGamesN	9/10
Push Square	8/10
RPGamer	4.5/5
RPGFan	85/100
Shacknews	8/10
Video Games Chronicle	3/5

Final Fantasy Resonance received "generally favorable" reviews from critics, according to review aggregator Metacritic. OpenCritic determined that 92% of critics recommended the game.

The game was nominated for "Best Role Playing Game" at The Game Awards 2026.
