= Octopath Traveler 0 =

2025 role-playing game by Square Enix

- Developer: DokiDoki Groove Works
- Publisher: Square Enix
- Directors: Yasuhiro Kidera; Katsuhiro Miyano
- Producers: Tomoya Asano; Masashi Takahashi
- Designers: Akira Suzuki; Machiko Horie
- Programmers: Satoshi Karasawa; Kanau Shibayama
- Artist: Kenta Kamada
- Writer: Kakunoshin Futsuzawa
- Composer: Yasunori Nishiki
- Series: Octopath Traveler
- Engine: Unreal Engine 5
- Platforms: Nintendo Switch; Nintendo Switch 2; PlayStation 4; PlayStation 5; Windows; Xbox Series X/S
- Release: December 4, 2025
- Genre: Role-playing

Octopath Traveler 0 (Note: OCTOPATH TRAVELLER(オクトパストラベラー) 0 (Okutopasu Toraberā Zero)) is a 2025 role-playing video game developed by DokiDoki Groove Works and published by Square Enix. The game serves as the prequel to Octopath Traveler, and a console adaptation of Octopath Traveler: Champions of the Continent. The game released for the Nintendo Switch, Nintendo Switch 2, PlayStation 4, PlayStation 5, Windows, and Xbox Series X/S on December 4, 2025.

== Gameplay ==
The game features over 30 recruitable party members and allows for the formation of parties of 8 characters. The combat of Octopath Traveler 0 retains the break and boost battle system and turn-based combat from the previous series. According to Square Enix's initial press release, Octopath Traveler 0 will incorporate gameplay and story elements from Octopath Traveler: Champions of the Continent, the 2020 prequel to Octopath Traveler. Producer Hiroto Suzuki stated that the main story, without any of the optional content, takes about 100 hours to complete.

Players create a custom protagonist whose hometown of Wishvale is destroyed in a fire. The story is described as a "journey of restoration" as players must rebuild Wishvale using the game's town-building and farming features. The number of buildings that can be placed in Wishvale depends on the hardware the game is played on; PC, Xbox Series X/S, and PlayStation 5 players are allowed to place 500 buildings, while those playing on the original Nintendo Switch are only be able to place 250 buildings. Nintendo Switch 2 and PlayStation 4 players are able to place 400 buildings. Compared to previous games, Square Enix added additional narrative content, new character backstories, and full voice-over work.

Octopath Traveler 0 features a town-building system that lets players build a home base by placing buildings, crop fields, flora, paths and other structures on a given grid. These structures can be improved through exploration and battle. Players can recruit up to 30 possible companions who will join their party either as playable fighters or settlers. In combat, party members are arranged into an offense-focused frontline and a defensive backline, each comprising four characters, between which players can swap during battle. Outside of Wishvale, players will often trigger random encounters that force their party into battle. Players must manage their party composition, their resources, and exploit strengths and weaknesses of enemies to "break" them.

== Story ==
The game serves as a prequel to the original Octopath Traveler game, taking place in the same fictional continent of Osterra. It follows the custom protagonist, default name Zero, after their hometown of Wishvale is destroyed, they journey across the land to rebuild and repopulate Wishvale, starting the "Kindlers of the Flame" - story line. As they continue along on their journey, they obtain the Divine Ring of the Flamebringer from a scholar Nomos, who tasks them with retrieving the other Divine Rings, starting three "Master" - story lines themed around wealth, fame and power. Three of the rings have fallen into the hands of three villains who conspired Wishvale`s destruction: Herminia the "The Covetous Witch", crime lord of the Valore, Tytos the "Hero" of the Scarlet Wings, who burned Wishvale to the ground and Auguste the "Genius Playwright", a serial killer who draws inspirations from the atrocities he commits to his plays.

After defeating said three villains and obtaining their divine rings, Zero meets Sazantos the Flameguard, who asks them to seal rings away, however the rings are stolen by Pardis III the "God of War", power hungry tyrant king of Edoras who aims to use the divine rings to conquer all of Orsterra, starting the "Master of All" - story line. With the help of neighboring kingdoms of Altinia, Riven and Pardis`s rebellious daughter Alaune, Zero manages to end mad king`s reign and recover stolen rings.

Sazantos informs Zero there are still three more divine rings left, starting three "Bestower" - storylines, with three new villains: Oskha the "Have-Not", a vigilante who aims to kill rich people of the world, Tatloch, empress of the western nation of G'roha who aims to claim divine rings for herself and conquer Orsterra and Ceraphina who turned Scarlet Wings remnants into a Black Scarlet cult helping her to become a god.

Upon completing all of the story lines, Nomos reveals himself to be Finis, husband of the Orsa, creator goddess Of Orsterra. Finis bestowed the divine rings to humanity to judge their worth. Sazantos kills Finis and steals the divine rings in order to open Gate of the Finis and obtain the power of Orsa, starting the "Bestower of All" - story line. He uses Orsa`s power to create an ideal world, an utopia where human greed and desire doesn`t exists and offers Zero to live in it. Zero refuses, challenging Sazantos who fuses with Orsa, becoming god-like Or`sazantos. Zero, alongside their companions defeat him.

Depending on players action, there are two endings:

Normal: Zero battles Bestower of All, manifestation of the divine rings and sazantos desire of greedless world.

True ending: Zero sacrifices the divine ring to cleanse Sazantos from the darkness inside of him to save him. However Galdera, the infamous thirteenth fallen god, consumes Orsa`s body, becoming nightmarish Or`galdera. With their combine powers, Zero, Sazantos and their companions, defeat Or`galdera who swears to bide his time and return. Sazantos, remorseful for his actions, travels across the world to atone for his sins. Zero, after saying goodbye to everyone in rebuilt Wishvale, decides to go after him.

== Development and release ==
Octopath Traveler 0 takes inspiration from Square Enix's previous free-to-play prequel Octopath Traveler: Champions of the Continent which was released for iOS and Android. It overhauled Champions of the Continent's story and removed its gacha and mobile game mechanics. Because the mobile game featured only partial voice acting, the developers asked the Japanese cast to deliver more natural performances when reprising their roles. The color palette and character illustrations also adopt a more muted and realistic tone. The map for the continent of Orsterra was painted by Italian painter and cartographer Francesca Baerald, who also contributed her work to the previous series. In an interview with Famitsu in early September 2025, producer Hiroto Suzuki stated that game development are entering final stages. He explained that the title's "0" reflects the team’s wish for the game to be accessible to newcomers as well as existing fans.

Octopath Traveler 0 was first showcased during the Nintendo Direct: Partner Showcase on July 31, 2025, alongside The Adventures of Elliot: The Millennium Tales, another one of Square Enix's upcoming HD-2D titles. The showcase stated that the game would be available to play on both the Nintendo Switch and Nintendo Switch 2 on December 4, 2025. Square Enix confirmed in a blog post that, alongside the Switch release, the game would also launch on PlayStation 4 and PlayStation 5, Windows, and Xbox Series X/S. A demo of the game featuring a character recruitment quest, a dungeon, and a boss fight was available for play at Gamescom and PAX West in 2025. Pre-orders went live the same day.

=== Reception ===
==== Pre-release ====
Ethan Gach of Kotaku praised the game's music and described its HD-2D art style as "still pretty and effective nostalgia bait."

Steve Watts of GameSpot highlighted the expanded party size of eight characters and the "Stardew Lite appeal" of the base-building mechanics. He also described the soundtrack as "stellar", particularly during combat sequences.

Jordan Rudek of Nintendo World Report initially expressed concern that the game might be a straightforward console port of the mobile title but later noted relief at its emphasis on exploration, progression, and reworked combat.

Writing for TheGamer, Sam Woods commended the game's intricate tactical combat while criticizing the length of battles. He also noted difficulty with random encounters and the overall challenge level.

==== Critical response ====
Reception

Aggregate scores
Aggregator	Score
Metacritic	(NS2) 82/100 (PC) 80/100 (PS5) 84/100
OpenCritic	81% recommend

Review scores
Publication	Score
Destructoid	8.5/10
Famitsu	34/40 (8/10, 9/10, 9/10, 8/10) (Note: Each of the four reviewers in Famitsu scored the game on a ten-point scale.)
Game Informer	8/10
GameSpot	8/10
GamesRadar+	4/5
Hardcore Gamer	4/5
Nintendo Life	9/10
Nintendo World Report	9/10
Push Square	7/10
RPGFan	85/100
Shacknews	8/10

Octopath Traveler 0 received "generally favorable" reviews, according to the review aggregator website Metacritic, and a "Strong" approval rating from critics according to OpenCritic. Famitsu gave the game a positive score amongst its four reviewers. The journal also noted that Octopath Traveler 0 "takes between 80 to 100 hours to clear".
