= Tokyo College of Music =

Music school in Tokyo, Japan

Coordinates: 35°43′22.7″N 139°42′51.8″E

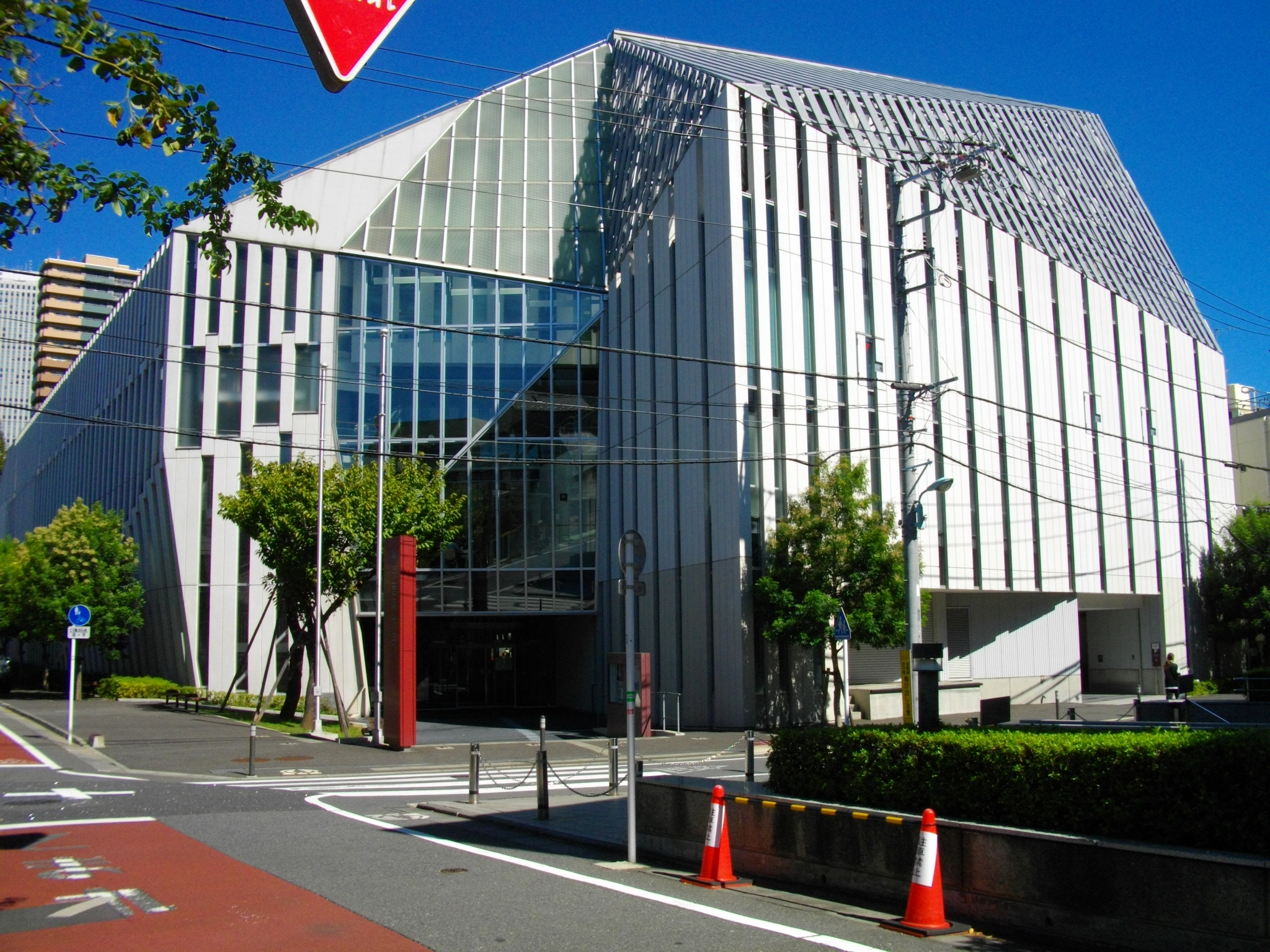
Tokyo College of Music, Ikebukuro Campus

Tokyo College of Music (東京音楽大学, Tōkyō Ongaku Daigaku) is a private music school and university in Tokyo, Japan. Offering a range of undergraduate, post graduate and doctoral degree programs, the college was originally named as the Toyo Conservatory of Music (東洋音楽学校, Tōyō Ongaku Gakkō) in Kanda, Tokyo, in 1907.

== History ==
The college moved to Toshima, Tokyo in 1924 after the original campus was destroyed by the Great Kantō earthquake. The college changed its name to Tokyo College of Music in 1969.

A second modern campus and performance facility was opened in 2019 in Kamimeguro, Meguro.

== Some notable graduates ==
- Yuko Suzuhana - singer and leader of Wagakki Band
- Junichi Hirokami – conductor
- Mahito Yokota – composer
- Naoki Satō – composer
- Yasunori Nishiki – composer
- Yugo Kanno – composer and musician
- Riyoko Ikeda - opera singer and manga artist
