= Granblue Fantasy: The Animation =

Japanese anime television series

- Key visual
- Genre: Adventure; Fantasy
- Created by: Cygames
- Manga
- Written by: Makoto Fugetsu
- Illustrated by: cocho
- Published by: Cygames; Kodansha
- English publisher: NA: Kodansha USA
- Magazine: Cycomi
- Original run: May 2016 – January 2020
- Volumes: 7
- Anime television series
- Directed by: Yūki Itō (S1); Ayako Kurata (S1) (Note: Anime Series Director (アニメシリーズディレクター).); Yui Umemoto (S2)
- Produced by: Kenta Suzuki; Tatsushi Moriya
- Written by: Cygames (S1) (Note: Screenplay credits given to Nao Takizawa, Kyōhei Terashima, and Chiaki Nagai.); Kiyoko Yoshimura (S2)
- Music by: Nobuo Uematsu (S1); Tsutomu Narita; Yasunori Nishiki
- Studio: A-1 Pictures (S1); MAPPA (S2)
- Licensed by: AUS: Madman Entertainment; NA: Aniplex of America; SEA: Muse Communication; UK: MVM Films
- Original network: Tokyo MX, BS11, GYT, GTV, MBS, AT-X, TVA, HBC, RKB, Saga TV
- Original run: January 21, 2017 – August 26, 2020
- Episodes: 28
- Anime television series

Grand Blues!
- Directed by: Kenshirou Morii
- Written by: Kikuhitomoji, Kenshirou Morii, Soushi Kinutani
- Music by: Tsutomu Narita
- Studio: DMM.futureworks; W-Toon Studio
- Licensed by: Crunchyroll
- Original network: Tokyo MX, BS11, AT-X
- Original run: October 8, 2020 – December 24, 2020
- Episodes: 12
- icon

Granblue Fantasy: The Animation is a Japanese anime television series adaptation of the Granblue Fantasy video game series. The first season, animated by A-1 Pictures, aired from April to June 2017. A second season, animated by MAPPA, aired from October to December 2019.

== Characters ==
Gran (グラン, Guran)
Voiced by: Yūki Ono (Japanese); Kyle McCarley (English)
Gran's dream was to become a skyfarer like his father. He saves Lyria but he ends up gravely hurt. Lyria saves him in return by sharing her powers, after which they begin their journey together, along with his childhood friend Vyrn and Lyria's protector, Katalina, to evade capture by the Erste Empire, which are after Lyria for her powers.
Lyria (ルリア, Ruria)
Voiced by: Nao Tōyama (Japanese); Kira Buckland (English)
Lyria has the ability to connect with Primal Beasts through her powers, represented by a blue jewel. She was held hostage by the Empire for her ability as they wanted to use her in their experiments to control Primal Beasts.
Vyrn (ビィ, Bī)
Voiced by: Rie Kugimiya (Japanese); Sandy Fox (English)
A lizard-like creature that insists that he is a dragon. He's a companion of Gran and follows him wherever he goes. He has a love for apples and has been seen to be somewhat swayed into doing something when offered an apple as a reward.
Katalina Alize (カタリナ・アリゼ, Katarina Arize)
Voiced by: Miyuki Sawashiro (Japanese); Erica Lindbeck (English)
Once a lieutenant of the Empire. She saves Lyria from a cell aboard an Empire warship and escapes. Though successful, she is branded as a traitor but believes she has done the right thing by Lyria. She is a strong sword fighter and wields a rapier. She frequently shows her skills when up against the Empire's soldiers.
Rackam (ラカム, Rakamu)
Voiced by: Hiroaki Hirata (Japanese); Kyle Hebert (English)
An airship pilot stranded in Port Breeze who watches over the wreckage of his ship.
Io Euclase (イオ・ユークレース, Io Yūkurēsu)
Voiced by: Yukari Tamura (Japanese); Jackie Lastra (English)
A young healing mage in training.
Rosetta (ロゼッタ, Rozetta)
Voiced by: Rie Tanaka (Japanese); Allegra Clark (English)
A mysterious woman from Lumacie who is much older and wiser than she appears.
Sierokarte (シェロカルテ, Sherokarute)
Voiced by: Emiri Katō (Japanese); Faye Mata (English)
The owner of the "Knickknack Shack" who often has any items and information that the Skyfarers need.
Black Knight (黒騎士, Kuro Kishi)
Voiced by: Romi Park
Drang (ドランク, Doranku)
Voiced by: Tomokazu Sugita (Japanese); Ray Chase (English)
One of the Empire's operatives who hunts down Lyria, often has a light-hearted tone that Sturm can barely tolerate.
Sturm (スツルム, Sutsurumu)
Voiced by: Kanae Itō (Japanese); Katelyn Gault (English)
Another of the Empire's operatives who works closely with Drang.
Eugen (オイゲン, Oigen)
Voiced by: Kazuhiro Yamaji (season 1), Keiji Fujiwara (season 2) (Japanese); Richard Epcar (English)
Cagliostro (カリオストロ, Kariosutoro)
Voiced by: Sakura Tange
An alchemist, who uses countless female clones of herself as vessels.
Pommern (ポンメルン, Ponmerun)
Voiced by: Wataru Yokojima
A high-ranking officer of the Erste Empire, he reports directly to the Chancellor herself.
Ferry (フェリ, Feri)
Voiced by: Madoka Yonezawa
A ghost girl that Gran and the crew meet on the mist-shrouded island. Her past is a mystery waiting to be solved.

== Production ==
Granblue Fantasy: The Animation was produced by A-1 Pictures and directed by Yūki Itō, featuring character designs by Toshifumi Akai, and music composed by Nobuo Uematsu, Tsutomu Narita and Yasunori Nishiki. Bump of Chicken performed the series' opening theme, titled "Go", and Haruhi performed the series' ending theme, titled "Sora no Parade" (ソラのパレード). It was scheduled to premiere in January 2017, but was delayed to April 2 for unknown reasons. An anime television special ("Zinkenstill Arc") which aired the first two episodes of the anime television series was broadcast on January 21 on Tokyo MX prior to the anime series. Aniplex of America has licensed the series in North America. The 12-episode series aired from April 2 to June 18, 2017, on Tokyo MX and other channels. An extra episode aired on Tokyo MX on June 25, and the Blu-ray/DVD Volume 7, released on October 25, featured this one and a second extra episode. MVM Films released the series in the United Kingdom.

A second season ran for another 12 episodes from October 4 to December 27, 2019, on Tokyo MX and other channels. The second season is produced by MAPPA. Yui Umemoto directed the second season, while Kiyoko Yoshimura served as the new scriptwriter and Fumihide Sai as the new character designer. Tsutomu Narita and Yasunori Nishiki returned to compose the music. The main cast members returned to reprise their roles. Seven Billion Dots performed the series' opening theme, titled "Stay With Me", while Adieu performed the series' ending theme "Ao" (蒼). Like the first season, an extra episode aired on March 27, 2020, and the Blu-ray/DVD Volume 7, released on August 26, featured this one and a second extra episode.

In the Fall 2020 season, DMM.futureworks and W-Toon Studio produced a standalone 12-episode short anime adaptation of the 4-panel comedy manga "Grand Blues!" by Kikuhitomoji, which was announced following after the game's annual April Fools event, "Big Bad Shadow", on April 2.

== Episodes ==
=== Season 1 ===
| No. | Title (Note: All English titles are taken from Crunchyroll.) | Directed by | Written by | Original air date |
|---|---|---|---|---|
| 1 | "Girl in Blue"; Transliteration: "Aoi no Shōjo" (Japanese: 蒼の少女) | Yūki Itō | Nao Takizawa | April 2, 2017 |
| 2 | "Departure"; Transliteration: "Tabidachi" (Japanese: 旅立ち) | Ayako Kurata | Kyōhei Terashima | April 9, 2017 |
| 3 | "Meet the Wind"; Transliteration: "Kaze no Deai" (Japanese: 風の出会い) | Toshimasa Ishii | Nao Takizawa | April 16, 2017 |
| 4 | "A Helmsman's Resolve"; Transliteration: "Sōda-shi no Ketsui" (Japanese: 操舵士の決意) | Masahiko Matsunaga | Nao Takizawa | April 23, 2017 |
| 5 | "The Storm Guardian"; Transliteration: "Kessen, Arashi no Shugoshin" (Japanese: 決戦、嵐の守護神) | Hidetoshi Takahashi | Nao Takizawa | April 30, 2017 |
| 6 | "The Veil is Lifted"; Transliteration: "Omoi wa Kagerō no Gotoku" (Japanese: 想いは陽炎の如く) | Hidekazu Hara | Chiaki Nagai | May 7, 2017 |
| 7 | "The Iron Giant"; Transliteration: "Tetsu no Kyojin" (Japanese: 鉄の巨人) | Toshimasa Ishii | Nao Takizawa; Chiaki Nagai | May 14, 2017 |
| 8 | "A Pair Apart"; Transliteration: "Futari no Kyori" (Japanese: ふたりの距離) | Takashi Andō | Kyōhei Terashima | May 21, 2017 |
| 9 | "Horizon in the Clouds"; Transliteration: "Unjō no Suihei Sen" (Japanese: 雲上の水平線) | Yukiko Imai | Nao Takizawa | May 28, 2017 |
| 10 | "Separation"; Transliteration: "Kairi" (Japanese: 解離) | Kazuki Horiguchi | Nao Takizawa | June 4, 2017 |
| 11 | "Lyria's Wish"; Transliteration: "Ruria no Omoi" (Japanese: ルリアの想い) | Ayako Kurata | Chiaki Nagai | June 11, 2017 |
| 12 | "Showdown on the High Seas"; Transliteration: "Taikai no Kessen" (Japanese: 大海の決戦) | Yūki Itō; Yū Aoki | Nao Takizawa | June 18, 2017 |
| EX1 | "Another Sky"; Transliteration: "Mō Hitotsu no Sora" (Japanese: もう一つの空) | Takashi Andō | Chiaki Nagai; Nao Takizawa | June 25, 2017 (Tokyo MX) |
| EX2 | "Jack O'Lantern"; Transliteration: "Kabocha no Rantan" (Japanese: カボチャのランタン) | Yūki Itō | Nao Takizawa | October 25, 2017 (Blu-Ray/DVD) |

=== Season 2 ===
| No. | Title | Directed by | Written by | Original air date |
|---|---|---|---|---|
| 1 | "Skyfarers in the Blue"; Transliteration: "Kikūshi no Sora" (Japanese: 騎空士の空) | Hisatoshi Shimizu | Kiyoko Yoshimura | October 4, 2019 |
| 2 | "The Albion Citadel"; Transliteration: "Jōsai Toshi Arubion" (Japanese: 城砦都市アルビオン) | Yūki Nishihata | Kiyoko Yoshimura | October 11, 2019 |
| 3 | "False Freedom"; Transliteration: "Itsuwari no Jiyu" (Japanese: 偽りの自由) | Takashi Kobayashi | Kazuhiko Inukai | October 18, 2019 |
| 4 | "Unconveyable Feelings"; Transliteration: "Todokanu Omoi" (Japanese: 届かぬ想い) | Teruyuki Ōmine | Ayumu Hisao | October 25, 2019 |
| 5 | "Katalina and Vira"; Transliteration: "Katarina to Vīra" (Japanese: カタリナとヴィーラ) | Kōki Aoshima | Kōsuke Isshiki | November 1, 2019 |
| 6 | "The Mist Shrouded Island"; Transliteration: "Kiri ni Tsutsumareta Shima" (Japanese: 霧に包まれた島) | Yasutomo Okamoto; Kim Min-sun; Kim Sang-yeob | Ayumu Hisao | November 15, 2019 |
| 7 | "The Immortal Primal Beast"; Transliteration: "Fushi no Seishoujuu" (Japanese: 不死の星晶獣) | Teruyuki Ōmine; Park Jae-ik | Kazuhiko Inukai | November 22, 2019 |
| 8 | "Memories of Family"; Transliteration: "Kazoku no Kioku" (Japanese: 家族の記憶) | Yūki Nishihata | Kiyoko Yoshimura | November 29, 2019 |
| 9 | "The Town of Promises"; Transliteration: "Yakusoku no Machi" (Japanese: 約束の街) | Yasunori Gotō | Ayumu Hisao | December 6, 2019 |
| 10 | "The Impossible Dream"; Transliteration: "Miha Tenu Yume" (Japanese: 見果てぬ夢) | Kunihiro Mori | Kazuhiko Inukai | December 13, 2019 |
| 11 | "Contract"; Transliteration: "Seiyaku" (Japanese: 誓約) | Yui Umemoto | Kiyoko Yoshimura | December 20, 2019 |
| 12 | "Signpost"; Transliteration: "Michishirube" (Japanese: 道標) | Teruyuki Ōmine; Nanako Shimazaki | Kiyoko Yoshimura | December 27, 2019 |
| EX1 | "One More Journey"; Transliteration: "Mōhitotsu no Tabiji" (Japanese: もう一つの旅路) | Yui Umemoto; Ikuo Yamakado | Kōsuke Isshiki | March 27, 2020 (Tokyo MX) |
| EX2 | "The Masked Cypher Descends! / A Tale of St. Albion Girls' Academy"; Transliteration: "Saifāmasuku! / Sei Arubion jo Gakuen Monogatari" (Japanese: 降臨！サイファーマスク！/聖アルビオン女学園物語) | Kōki Aoshima; Yasunori Gotō | Ayumu Hisao; Kazuhiko Inukai | August 26, 2020 (Blu-Ray/DVD) |

=== Grand Blues! ===
| No. | Title | Original air date |
|---|---|---|
| 1 | "In These Grand Blue Skies"; Transliteration: "Grand Blue no Sora De" (Japanese: グランブルーの空で) | October 8, 2020 |
| 2 | "Vyrn's Pastime / Vyrn Lovers Anomnymous / The Vyrn Doll / The Waterfall Training Mystery"; Transliteration: "Bii no Himatsubushi / Bii-kun Aikouka no Tsudoi / Nuigurumi / Takigyou no Kai" (Japanese: ビィの暇つぶし/ビィ君愛好家の集い/ぬいぐるみ/滝行の怪) | October 15, 2020 |
| 3 | "The Sisters' Cheer Squad / Making Pie with Lily / It's the Little Things That Matter to Cucouroux"; Transliteration: "Genkizukeru San Shimai / Lily to Pie Tsukuri / Ki ni Suru Kukuru" (Japanese: 元気づける三姉妹/リリィとパイ作り/気にするククル) | October 22, 2020 |
| 4 | "Cagliostro on the Water / Jin and the Tightness of the Mind / Candy Stick Game"; Transliteration: "Umi no Ue no Kariostro / Jin to Kokoro no Shimari / Yakigashi Game" (Japanese: 海の上のカリオストロ/ジンと心のしまり/焼き菓子ゲーム) | October 29, 2020 |
| 5 | "Cain Gives the Orders / Midnight Billards / The Potential Customer"; Transliteration: "Shiki Suru Cain / Mayonaka no Billiard / Mou Hitori no Kyaku" (Japanese: 指揮するカイン/真夜中のビリヤード/もう一人の客) | November 5, 2020 |
| 6 | "Six Flowers of Fate"; Transliteration: "Sakihokoru Rikka" (Japanese: 咲き誇る六花) | November 12, 2020 |
| 7 | "Talk About a Cry-Sis! / Collect the Sisterly Power / Thank Heaven For Bis Sisters!"; Transliteration: "Onee-chan Kaigi / Tsudou Onee-chan Chikara / Tataeyou! Onee-chan" (Japanese: お姉ちゃん会議/集うお姉ちゃん力/讃えよう! お姉ちゃん) | November 19, 2020 |
| 8 | "Io and Magic Laughs / Lancelot Up Against the Wall / Escape Room"; Transliteration: "Io to Egao no Mahou / Toraware no Lancelot / Derarenai Heya" (Japanese: イオと笑顔の魔法/囚われのランスロット/出られない部屋) | November 26, 2020 |
| 9 | "Zeta's Way with Passwords / Vaseraga Stands By? / Dog Lover and Magical Item"; Transliteration: "Fuuin Kaijo no Aikotoba / Taiki Suru Vazaraga? / Inuha to Mahou no Item" (Japanese: 封印解除の合い言葉/待機するバザラガ?/犬派と魔法のアイテム) | December 3, 2020 |
| 10 | "Repaint the Dragoness / Swift as the Wind! Mysteria Friends! / Orderly Dreams"; Transliteration: "Repaint the Ryuu Hime / Hayate! Manaria Friends / Chitsujo no Yume" (Japanese: リペイント・ザ・竜姫/疾風! マナリアフレンズ/秩序の夢) | December 10, 2020 |
| 11 | "A Cuppa Before Battle / Feather of the Four Primarchs / Belial Vanishes Into the Horizon"; Transliteration: "Tatakai no Mae no Ippai / Yon Daitenshi no Hane / Belial Niji ni Keyu" (Japanese: 戦いの前の一杯/四大天使の羽/ベリアル虹に消ゆ) | December 17, 2020 |
| 12 | "A Final Battle to Shake Off Your Blues!"; Transliteration: "Burucchimau Saishuu Kessen!" (Japanese: ぶるっちまう最終決戦!) | December 24, 2020 |

== Other media ==
=== Light novel ===
A light novel adaptation was released in 2014. The series currently has four books that contain game codes that can be redeemed for special items in the game. The digital volumes of the Granblue Fantasy light novel also contain game codes.

=== Manga ===
A manga adaptation began serialization on Cygames and Kodansha's Cycomi manga website in May 2016, and ended serialization in January 2020. The manga series is written by Makoto Fugetsu and illustrated by cocho. The series is licensed in North America by Kodansha USA.
