= Octopath Traveler II =

2023 role-playing video game

- Developers: Acquire; Square Enix Creative Business Unit 2
- Publisher: Square Enix
- Director: Keisuke Miyauchi
- Producers: Tomoya Asano; Masashi Takahashi
- Artist: Naoki Ikushima
- Writers: Takashi Hino; Kakunoshin Futsuzawa
- Composer: Yasunori Nishiki
- Series: Octopath Traveler
- Engine: Unreal Engine 4
- Platforms: Nintendo Switch; PlayStation 4; PlayStation 5; Windows; Xbox One; Xbox Series X/S; Nintendo Switch 2
- Release: Switch, PS4, PS5, Windows; February 24, 2023; Xbox One, Series X/S; June 5, 2024; Nintendo Switch 2; JP: July 13, 2026; WW: October 1, 2026
- Genre: Role-playing
- Mode: Single-player

Octopath Traveler II is a 2023 role-playing video game developed by Square Enix and Acquire and published by Square Enix. It is a sequel to Octopath Traveler (2018), and the third entry in the series after the prequel mobile game Octopath Traveler: Champions of the Continent (2020), though it features a new cast of characters and setting separate from prior games. It was released worldwide in February 2023, for Nintendo Switch, PlayStation 4, PlayStation 5 and Windows; it is the first Octopath game released on PlayStation platforms. Xbox One and Xbox Series X/S versions were released in June 2024. The Nintendo Switch 2 version was released in July 2026 in Japan, alongside the Switch 2 version of the first game, with worldwide release of both games scheduled for October of the same year.

Octopath Traveler II received positive reviews from critics.

== Gameplay ==
Similar to its predecessor, Octopath Traveler, the game plays as a traditional JRPG, with players managing eight separate characters, each with their own personal story to fulfill, engaging with various non-player characters while fighting against a variety of enemies via a turn-based battle system.

Each time the player starts a new game, they must choose one of the eight characters as their main protagonist, who they cannot switch out of their party until that character's story is completed; the other seven can each be met in any order. The player can choose which character's story to progress, and have up to four of these characters being useable for interacting with the game world and engaging enemies. Unlike the first game, each character goes through their first chapter on their own (or with unique allies), but can go through the remaining chapters with the aid of the others.

Like its predecessor, Octopath Traveller II uses a "break" and "boost" system for combat. Each enemy in the game is given a number of "Shield Points", which while active reduces the amount of damage they take; these points can be reduced by finding and attacking their weakness - a combination of certain attributes consisting of any of the game's six weapon types - sword, axe, staff, spear, knife and bow - and magical elements - fire, ice, thunder, wind, light, and dark. Once their shield points hit "0", the enemy is temporarily stunned and receives more damage. Each playable character in the team accumlates one "BP" (Boost Point) each turn, which can be used to strength certain actions by up to four times the effect, including attacking and class abilities; after using BP, they must wait after their next turn to begin naturally accumulating BP, but will lose all BP if the character is knocked out. New to battles are "Latent Powers" - a special ability that each character has which can grant them a unique action, such as acting twice in a turn, or reducing an enemy's Shield Points regardless of their weakness. Similar to BP, Latent Powers gain energy when characters take damage or Break enemies, but will be lost if the character is knocked out.

Outside of combat, players can explore each area to find various NPCs to converse with, side quests to undertake, shops to acquire supplies and equipment, and open chests for items or money. Each character can interact with NPCs via "Path Actions" - specialized actions that each character can use, either to acquire information, items, bring them along as a summonable ally, or to knock out. New to Octopath Traveller II is a "Daytime/Nighttime" gameplay system, in which players can change the time of day, which not only determines what enemies in combat areas they face, but also where NPCs are in a location and what Path Actions can be undertaken. For example, a character during the Daytime could use a path action to duel an NPC, while during Nighttime they could bribe the same NPC for information. Like its predecessor, Path Actions are impacted by a difficulty rating, a success rate, or by the level of the character; with certain actions deemed unlawful, incurring a penalty if they are unsuccessful too many times and requiring the player to use a pub to remove it.

The game features around twelve jobs: eight basic jobs, which each character has as their main job and that can't be switched out; and four advanced jobs that players must find. Each character can use any of the twelve jobs they don't have as a secondary job, once they find a guild that grants a licence to it; while basic jobs can be used as a secondary one by up to three additional characters, only one character can use each of the advanced job. Each job has access to a certain selection of weapon types and unique actions - offensive, defensive and supportive - and its own selection of skills, which are unlocked by acquiring and spending Job Points (JP), as well as support skills which can further enhance the characters, such as increasing a primary attribute, or increasing the amount of money won in fights.

== Story ==
While Octopath Traveler II retains the structure of following eight separate characters, it features a new cast in the world of Solistia, a setting more technologically advanced than the medieval environment of the previous game, resembling the eighteenth or nineteenth centuries. During the game's events, technological developments such as the steam engine emerge.

The story follows eight protagonists, each with individual narratives:

- Ochette, a hunter from Toto'haha, sets out to capture three legendary beasts to prevent a prophesied calamity, ultimately confronting and killing her unchosen companion when it leads the attack on her homeland.
- Castti Florenz, an amnesiac apothecary, retraces her past and confronts her former colleague Trousseau, who used poisoned rain to destroy a village and threatens another town.
- Throné Anguis, a member of the Blacksnakes assassins' guild, seeks freedom by stealing keys to her collar and eventually kills Claude, the guild's true leader and her biological father.
- Osvald V. Vanstein, a scholar falsely imprisoned for murdering his family, escapes to pursue the real culprit, Harvey, who conducted experiments using Osvald's wife and kidnapped his daughter. Osvald defeats Harvey and rescues his daughter.
- Partitio Yellowil, a merchant seeking to eliminate poverty, attempts to acquire rights to the steam engine from businessman Roque Brilliante and ultimately forces him to honor their agreement.
- Agnea Bristarni, a dancer inspired by her late mother, travels to become a star and defeats her rival Dolcinaea in a competition.
- Temenos Mistral, a cleric investigating his archbishop's murder, uncovers the Moonshade Order and defeats Kaldena, who orchestrated the killing and attempted to harness dark power.
- Hikari Ku, crown prince of Ku, flees after his brother Mugen seizes power, later returning with allies to overthrow him and reclaim the throne.

In addition to individual stories, the game features "Crossed Paths" chapters in which pairs of travelers collaborate. Ochette and Castti investigate a dark presence in a forest, Throné and Temenos recover fragments of a mirror linked to a mysterious woman named Alpates, Osvald and Partitio assist in developing a telescope while noting unusual changes in the night sky, and Agnea and Hikari hold a festival following Ku's restoration.

After completing all stories, the travelers experience visions of the Sacred Flames extinguishing as the world is plunged into eternal night. Using Alpates's mirror, they seek to restore the flames and uncover the Moonshade Order's plans. The Dark Hunter, Petrichor, manipulated events involving Ochette's companion, while other antagonists influenced the protagonists' journeys. Temenos's acquaintance Mindt is revealed as Arcanette, leader of the Order, who orchestrated multiple events to revive the dark god Vide.

As the Sacred Flames are extinguished through various sacrifices, Arcanette attempts to revive Vide and bring about eternal night. The travelers defeat her, then pursue Oboro, who sacrifices himself to complete Vide's revival. The travelers ultimately defeat Vide and restore dawn to Solistia.

== Development ==
The game was first announced during a Nintendo Direct broadcast on September 13, 2022, with first live gameplay footage being shown a few days later at the Tokyo Game Show. Like the prior 2 entries in the series, Octopath Traveler and Octopath Traveler: Champions of the Continent, the game uses a graphical style dubbed HD-2D, an approach that recreates the 2D pixel-based graphics style of the 16-bit era of video games and portrays it in a high-definition, 3D diorama style. At the time of announcement, the game was already estimated to be approximately 90% complete. The game was released on February 24, 2023, for the Nintendo Switch, PlayStation 4, PlayStation 5, and Windows platforms. A limited edition of the game with figurines of all eight main characters and an art book was also offered. A demo of the game was made available on Nintendo Switch, PlayStation and Steam prior its release. Xbox One and Xbox Series X/S versions were announced during Tokyo Game Show 2023. The Xbox versions released on June 5, 2024; the June 5 release included a patch for all platforms that included various difficult superbosses to fight in the postgame after clearing the main story. On July 13, 2026, the Nintendo Switch 2 versions of Octopath Traveler and Octopath Traveler II were released in Japan. The worldwide release of Switch 2 versions of both games is scheduled for October 1 of the same year.

== Music ==
The music for Octopath Traveler II was composed by Yasunori Nishiki, who also scored the first game. A six-disc album, Octopath Traveler II Original Soundtrack, containing 131 tracks, was released by Square Enix on March 1, 2023.

== Reception ==
Reception

Aggregate score
Aggregator	Score
Metacritic	(NS) 85/100 (PC) 83/100 (PS5) 86/100

Review scores
Publication	Score
Digital Trends	4/5
Famitsu	36/40
Game Informer	8.5/10
GameRevolution	9/10
Hardcore Gamer	4/5
IGN	7/10
Nintendo Life	9/10
Nintendo World Report	7.5/10
NME	4/5
Push Square	9/10
RPGFan	91/100
Shacknews	8/10

=== Critical reception ===
Octopath Traveler II received "generally favorable" reviews, according to review aggregator website Metacritic.

While enjoying the visuals, Polygon criticized the narrative of the main party, "When fighting, considering their strengths and weaknesses and using their abilities in concert during turn-based battles is crucial. But come to a main story scene, and everyone but the single person directly involved will suddenly disappear."

Others were more positive, with RPGFan asserting that the game improves on its predecessor, "Octopath Traveler II takes everything good about the first game, turns it up to 11, adds a few quality-of-life updates, and is, in fact, the superior game overall."

=== Sales ===
The Nintendo Switch version of Octopath Traveler II was the second bestselling retail game during its first week of release in Japan, with 53,995 physical copies being sold across the country. The PlayStation 5 version was the eighth bestselling retail game in Japan throughout the same week, with 14,422 physical copies being sold, while the PlayStation 4 version sold 7,269 physical copies in the country, making it the eleventh bestselling retail game of the week in the country.

The game sold 1 million units by June 2023.
