= Triangle Strategy =

2022 video game

- Developers: Square Enix; Artdink
- Publisher: Square Enix (Note: Nintendo published the Nintendo Switch version outside of Japan until December 2024.)
- Director: Kazuya Miyakawa
- Producers: Tomoya Asano; Yasuaki Arai
- Designer: Yurika Nogaki
- Programmer: Katsuji Oi
- Artist: Ayako Furukawa
- Writer: Naoki Yamamoto
- Composer: Akira Senju
- Engine: Unreal Engine 4
- Platforms: Nintendo Switch; Windows; Meta Quest 2; Meta Quest Pro; Meta Quest 3; PlayStation 5; Xbox Series X/S
- Release: Nintendo Switch; March 4, 2022; Windows; October 13, 2022; Meta Quest 2, Pro, 3; October 31, 2024; PlayStation 5, Xbox Series X/S; August 20, 2025
- Genre: Tactical role-playing
- Mode: Single-player

Triangle Strategy (Note: Japanese: トライアングルストラテジー, Hepburn: Toraianguru Sutoratejī) is a 2022 tactical role-playing game co-developed by Square Enix and Artdink and published by Square Enix for the Nintendo Switch. Nintendo released the game internationally for the Nintendo Switch. The Windows version was published by Square Enix and was released on October 13, 2022. A virtual reality version for Meta Quest 2, Meta Quest Pro and Meta Quest 3 was released on October 31, 2024. PlayStation 5 and Xbox Series X/S versions were released on August 20, 2025. The development of the game was led by Tomoya Asano, producer of Bravely Default and Octopath Traveler.

Triangle Strategy received positive reviews from critics, who praised the combat, narrative, score, and art direction but criticized the high volume of cutscenes.

== Gameplay ==
Triangle Strategy is a turn-based tactical role-playing game in the vein of Fire Emblem and Final Fantasy Tactics. The player takes turns moving characters from their party across a grid-based playing field in which computer-controlled opponents must be attacked and defeated. Each character has unique attributes and a set movement range per turn, as well as a number of special attacks and skills that consume a limited but rechargeable pool of Tactical Points per character. During the course of the campaign, levelling up characters by using them in battle will increase their attributes and unlock new special attacks and skills, and players can also upgrade individual attributes and their characters' class to make them more effective in combat. Along with the starting characters, a number of additional characters are recruited into the player's party during the course of the campaign. If a character in the player's party is defeated in combat, then they are removed from the battle, but there is no permadeath.

Players can use effective positioning of their units for more powerful attacks: for example, two characters placed on opposite sides of an enemy will attack the unit from both sides during the same turn, while an attack from behind or above the enemy will result in increased damage dealt. Doing so also rewards the player with Kudos points, which can be traded for character upgrade items or Quietus skills, which allow the player to execute one-time special actions during battle such as reviving a fallen party member or imbue all party members with increased movement.

Parts of the environment may also be exploited by players during combat: a fire attack could be used to set fire to the ground to hinder movement, while during one stage players are given the option to destroy houses in a village in order to trap enemy units. The terrain may also affect elemental attacks to the player's advantage; for example, wet terrain may spread the range of a lightning attack, while a wind attack may be used to push enemies off cliffs. The game also features exploration stages with no combat in which the player can speak to NPCs to gain new information and find hidden items and money.

The game features a storyline with branching paths, with four possible, unique endings. At various points the player and their party arrive at a major decision by consulting the Scales of Conviction, in which they vote for a specific outcome. Here, the player can persuade characters in their party beforehand to vote for a certain outcome which will alter the direction of the story. In addition, certain characters may only be recruited during a particular branching path. However, the game also employs a collapsing timeline, wherein branching paths only temporarily diverge the central story, before collapsing back into a central timeline. This is used until the final decision point, where the story splits into four distinctive endings. Despite this, the characters' roles in the story, character convictions, auxiliary story elements, and party members will vastly differ based on these choices.

The game features a New Game Plus mode, which offers returning players an increased difficulty level as well as the option to see how their decisions affect the story and lead to different branching paths.

== Synopsis ==
=== Setting and characters ===
The game takes place on the fictional continent of Norzelia. The story focuses on a new conflict thirty years after the "Saltiron War", a war between three countries of the continent – Glenbrook, Aesfrost, and Hyzante – that arose over fighting for the scarce resources of salt and iron. The game follows protagonist Serenoa Wolffort, the heir of House Wolffort, his childhood friend Roland, the second Prince of the Kingdom of Glenbrook, Serenoa's fiancée Frederica Aesfrost, a noblewoman of the Grand Duchy of Aesfrost, and the steward of House Wolffort Benedict Pascal, as they attempt to navigate their way through the conflict.

=== Plot ===
Thirty years after the Saltiron War, Glenbrook and Aesfrost agree to share the newly discovered Grand Norzelian Mine in an effort to improve relations between the two countries. However, as Serenoa inspects the mines with Gustadolph's cousin Dragan, assassins attack and kill Dragan. Gustadolph then accuses Glenbrook of murdering Dragan, using his death as a pretext to stage a punitive campaign against Glenbrook and invading its capital. Serenoa and his party are too late to stop Gustadolph from killing King Regna and Crown Prince Frani and capturing Princess Cordelia, leaving Roland as the sole heir to Glenbrook's throne. Determined to bring all of Glenbrook to heel, Gustadolph gives Serenoa an ultimatum: hand over Roland to him or face annihilation at the hands of his army. This represents the first of many choices Serenoa must make, including deciding on whether to enlist the aid of Hyzante to resist Aesfrost or collaborate with Aesfrost to repel an attempted invasion from Hyzante.

Eventually, Serenoa and his party are able to drive Aesfrost from Glenbrook, and he, Roland, Frederica, and Benedict go about trying to rebuild the kingdom. However, Roland is met with the cruel reality of being king, as he executes many of his own nobles for misappropriating reconstruction funds. Serenoa's father Symon is assassinated by royalists and as he is dying reveals to him that he is actually King Regna's illegitimate son who was secretly adopted by the Wolffort family to cover up the scandal. Frederica discovers that her people, the Rosellans, are being used as slave labor to harvest salt in Hyzante due to their ancestor's possessing knowledge of sources of salt outside of Hyzante, which would have threatened Hyzante's salt monopoly. They also discover that the Grand Norzelian Mine contains salt, which would allow whoever holds to it bypass Hyzante's salt monopoly.

It is at this point that Serenoa's comrades suggest differing plans of action. Roland advocates allying with Hyzante to destroy Aesfrost and avenge his family. Benedict recommends allying with Aesfrost to conquer Hyzante and break its hold over salt for good. Frederica implores him to help liberate the enslaved Rosellans and lead them back to their homeland of Centralia.

- If Serenoa chooses Roland's plan, Frederica abandons the party. Working together with Hyzante, Serenoa and Roland are able to conquer Aesfrost and kill Gustadolph and Dragan's father Svarog, unifying Norzelia under Hyzante's banner. While salt is now plentiful and the people have plenty to eat, the Rosellans still remain enslaved and any dissidents that speak out against Hyzante's state religion are ruthlessly suppressed. Frederica becomes a traveling nun trying to spread the truth about Hyzante's corruption to anybody who would listen.
- If Serenoa chooses Benedict's plan, Roland abandons the party. Serenoa is crowned king of Glenbrook with Frederica as his queen. Working together with Aesfrost, Serenoa and Benedict are able to conquer Hyzante, expose their religion as false, and force their leader Idore to flee into hiding. With Hyzante's salt monopoly broken and more sources of salt being discovered, Serenoa leads Norzelia into an age of peace and prosperity. However, uncontrolled salt trade leads to a massive wealth disparity leaving large swathes of the population to live in poverty, including the liberated Rosellans who are unable to take benefit of their newfound freedom. Roland, now a monk, joins with Idore to help the impoverished masses Serenoa has ignored.
- If Serenoa chooses Frederica's plan, Benedict abandons the party. Serenoa and Frederica lead a raid into Hyzante, instigating a slave revolt to free the Rosellans. Serenoa then leads the Rosellans to Norzelia's southern edge to enter Centralia, but Idore and his forces pursue them. Serenoa sacrifices himself to kill Idore and ensure that nobody can pursue the Rosellans. Frederica and Roland then leads the Rosellans to Centralia where they are able to build a new home for themselves. Meanwhile, Serenoa's actions have caused a massive power vacuum in Norzelia as numerous civil wars break out among the three nations. Benedict decides to join Gustadolph's side on the condition that he be allowed to rule House Wolffort's lands as an independent region.
- If Serenoa performed certain actions and made certain choices throughout the game, he can instead devise a new plan that satisfies all his companions. He overthrows and kills Gustadolph with the help of Dragan's father Svarog and repels Hyzante's attempt to destroy House Wolffort. He then raids Hyzante, kills Idore, and exposes the truth about their religion, causing Minister Lyla to defect to his side. Serenoa then lays the groundwork for all three nations under Roland, Svarog, and Lyla to join in a union of independent regions with equal representation. The Rosellans are freed from slavery and salt is distributed equally, ushering in an unprecedented golden age of peace. In order to mark this new age, Serenoa and Frederica marry with all of their friends and comrades in attendance.

== Development ==
The game was first announced under the working title of Project Triangle Strategy during a Nintendo Direct presentation on February 17, 2021. The presentation revealed the game as a collaboration between Square Enix and Artdink. Development is led by Square Enix producer Tomoya Asano, who had previously produced the Bravely Default and Octopath Traveler games. Asano noted that the change in direction from standard JRPG of past titles to a tactical RPG came from his desire to create a game with a more mature and adult story, something he felt was more conducive to a tactical RPG. First in-game footage of the game was also debuted on the same day, where it was shown to have the same "HD-2D" graphics style as Square Enix's Octopath Traveler, where SNES-styled graphics are given a high definition and 3D visual effect. The game was developed using Unreal Engine 4. A free demo was also released to the public upon announcement.

In September 2021, its final title was revealed to be Triangle Strategy. Additionally, Square Enix announced they had surveyed players who played the demo, and made direct changes based on common input points. Changes from the demo include providing additional difficulty modes, alternate camera controls, and the ability to review past character dialogue. Additionally, tweaks to improving graphics and load times were made. The game's main campaign was originally aimed to be approximately 50 hours long, though Tomoya Asano later stated it should take "around 30 hours" to finish. The game was released on the Nintendo Switch on March 4, 2022.

== Reception ==
Reception

Aggregate score
Aggregator	Score
Metacritic	NS: 83/100; PC: 83/100; PS5: 85/100

Review scores
Publication	Score
Game Informer	8.25/10
GameSpot	8/10
GamesRadar+	3.5/5
Hardcore Gamer	4/5
IGN	8/10
Nintendo Life	9/10
Nintendo World Report	9.5/10
Shacknews	8/10

Triangle Strategy received "generally favorable" reviews according to review aggregator website Metacritic.

Kotaku liked the game's demo, praising the game's modern twists on an established genre, and how it set up a complex story. Nintendo Life enjoyed Triangle Strategy for its deep and satisfying combat system, excellent narrative, compelling characters and high replayability, while criticizing the voice acting and dialogue. GamesRadar+ felt that although the battles were well designed, the story suffered from a lack of character development, "The rip-roaring pacing means Triangle Strategy never stops to let any one of these characters properly develop... there's barely a moment where they just get to be themselves outside of fighting for their damn lives". Polygon criticized the story as overbearing, feeling it often took the momentum from the gameplay, "Other sequences actively undermine the momentum of the drama unfolding in the gameplay. Square Enix and Artdink so desperately want to control the narrative through exposition and dialogue that they constantly telegraph major combat twists and emergent possibilities".

While disliking the voice acting, The Washington Post enjoyed the streamlined RPG mechanics, saying "Some players may find this lack of character customization options disappointing. However, I appreciated the fact that I didn't have to worry about whether I had bought the latest weapons and armor after every story mission". Nintendo World Report felt that combat made interesting use of each environment, making the maps feel distinct gameplay-wise, "Elevation, pillars, ponds, and even mine carts can all play a role during combat... water can even be electrified to send out a shockwave of damage against everyone standing in it". Eurogamer criticized the pacing of the game, especially the dialogue sequences, "the distribution of time between each of those aspects is where Triangle Strategy can get tedious. A battle is often followed by over an hour of cutscenes".

=== Sales ===
Upon release Triangle Strategy debuted at the top of the Famitsu sales charts in Japan, selling 86,298 physical copies in its first week. The game debuted at 7th place in the United Kingdom in the week after its release. On 18 March 2022, Tomoya Asano revealed on Twitter that two weeks after its release Triangle Strategy had sold more than 200,000 copies in Japan and Asia and 800,000 copies overall worldwide. In December 2022, Square Enix announced that Triangle Strategy had sold over one million copies.

=== Accolades ===
Triangle Strategy was nominated for "Best Role-Playing Game" at The Game Awards 2022, but lost to Elden Ring.
