= Octopath Traveler: Champions of the Continent =

2020 free-to-play role-playing video game

- Developer: Acquire
- Publishers: JP: Square Enix; SEA: Netease Games
- Director: Yasuhiro Kidera
- Producer: Hirohito Suzuki
- Writer: Kakunoshin Futsuzawa
- Composer: Yasunori Nishiki
- Series: Octopath Traveler
- Engine: Unreal Engine 4
- Platforms: Android, iOS
- Release: JP: October 28, 2020; WW: July 27, 2022; SEA: December 7, 2023
- Genre: Role-playing
- Mode: Single-player

Octopath Traveler: Champions of the Continent (Note: Japanese: OCTOPATH TRAVELLER(オクトパス トラベラー) 大陸の覇者, Hepburn: Okutopasu Toraberā Tairiku no Hasha; sometimes translated as Octopath Traveler: Conquerors of the Continent before its official localization) is a free-to-play role-playing video game developed by Acquire and published by Square Enix. The game, which serves as a prequel to the original Octopath Traveler, was released in October 2020 in Japan for Android and iOS, in the West in July 2022 and in December 2023 in Southeast Asia, which later became the global version after Square Enix transferred the global publishing rights to that version's publisher, Netease Games, in January 2025.

The game's story and mechanics were used as a foundation for Octopath Traveler 0, a console game that modified Champions of the Continent's presentation and structure to remove its gacha game systems. The game released on December 4, 2025 for Nintendo Switch, Nintendo Switch 2, PlayStation 4, PlayStation 5, Windows and Xbox Series X/S.

== Gameplay ==
Similar to the original Octopath Traveler, the game plays as a traditional turn-based JRPG. However, unlike the original, it also has free to play and in-app purchase gameplay mechanics worked into the game flow. While the original game only allowed for four characters to participate in battles at a time, Champions of the Continent extends the battles to involve up to eight characters. Additionally, touchscreen controls, including swiping and tapping, were added to the prequel. The original game's "field command" system, which allowed the player to do actions such as stealing from NPCs was also retained.

== Story ==
The game serves as a prequel to the original Octopath Traveler game, taking place in the same fictional continent of Osterra. There are three story paths in the game, following Herminia the "Witch of Greed", Tytos the "Hero", and Auguste the "Playwright". The game features a new cast of playable characters, though some characters from the original game make appearances as well.

== Development ==
The game was first announced in March 2019, with a prospective release date of later in the same year. A sign-up list for an early demo for the game started in the same month. The game features the HD-2D art style created for the previous title. The series producer Tomoya Asano framed the game as stop-gap release for the series, noting that "everyone waiting for a new game on console, we're sorry, but production will take a little while longer, so in the meantime, we hope you can enjoy [the smartphone game]." The game was released in Japan on iOS and Android devices on October 28, 2020. A Western release was announced in February 2022 for release later in the year. It was released in the West in July 2022.

== Reception ==
Reception

Aggregate score
Aggregator	Score
Metacritic	71/100

Octopath Traveler: Champions of the Continent received "mixed or average" reviews from critics, according to the review aggregation website Metacritic.

Commercially, the game performed well in Japan, with Square Enix reporting that it had been downloaded 3 million times in just 2 days. Reception to the title was mixed in the West. USGamer lamented that the game was unavailable on the Nintendo Switch like the original Octopath Traveler, and disapproved of the notion of free-to-play game mechanics in a turn-based JRPG. Destructoid noted similar concern about how modern free to play mechanics would mesh with a traditional JRPG. Other outlets, such as IGN and TouchArcade, expressed hope that the game would eventually be localized.
