= Zwei: The Ilvard Insurrection =

2008 video game

- Developer: Nihon Falcom
- Publisher: Xseed Games: JP: Nihon Falcom
- Composers: Hayato Sonoda; Takahiro Unisuga; Saki Momiyama; Masanori Osaki
- Platform: Windows
- Release: JP: 25 September 2008; WW: 31 October 2017
- Genre: Action role-playing game
- Mode: Single-player

Zwei: The Ilvard Insurrection, known in Japan as Zwei II, (Note: ツヴァイ 2 (Tsuvai 2)) is a 2008 action role-playing game developed by Nihon Falcom for Windows, which was released as a direct sequel to Zwei: The Arges Adventure. A re-release with additional features was released in Japan in December 2009 and in English by Xseed Games in October 2017.

In the game, players alternate between two main characters, Ragna Valentine and Alwen du Moonbria, with two other supporting characters replacing Alwen at certain points in the game. Ragna is adept in physical attacks, fighting with his unique Anchor Gear weapon, which receives numerous technical upgrades as the game progresses. Alwen is proficient in magic and is able to harness powerful elemental spells. The game starts with Ragna delivering cargo to the floating continent of Ilvard, when he is shot down from his airplane. Alwen, a vampire princess bonds with him to save his life and Ragna promises to reclaim Alwen's stolen castle to repay her.

== Gameplay ==
The game plays similar to the 3D Ys games, also produced by Falcom, with real-time battles and a fixed camera that follows the main character from a medium distance. One major difference is the presence of an inactive secondary character who follows the player's character for most of the game, usually either Alwen or Ragna, depending on who the player isn't controlling at that point in time. Initialising a physical attack forces the player to control Ragna, while initialising a magical attack causes Alwen to fight. Both characters are controlled in the same way, although they have different offensive and defensive stats.

The game features a variety of villages, where players can converse with NPC characters in typical RPG fashion. Travel between locations occurs via Ilvard's overworld map. The majority of the game takes place in dungeons filled with traps and monsters. A dungeon is composed of a few stages, which are split into three floors each. Each stage contains many small puzzle elements, which need to be solved to earn rare treasures or to simply progress. There are many mini-bosses and a dungeon boss, with the dungeon bosses requiring specific strategies to defeat, such as waiting for their weak spot to open.

Screenshot of Ragna fighting in a dungeon.

One of the unique aspects of the Zwei!! series is that defeating enemies does not award experience points, needed to level up, unlike in other RPGs. Instead enemies may drop food or coins when defeated. Food is very important as not only does it restore health, but it is the only commodity that awards experience points. Ten types of the same food can also be combined in the restaurant, found at the main village, to create a higher tier food item that awards more experience in comparison to the individual items.

To assist with item collection, players can buy pets from a pet store, such as a cat and dog. Pets automatically collect spoils, do minor damage to foes and can learn special abilities as they level up. There are also numerous gadget items, bought from shops or found in dungeons, which are applied as attachments to the game screen. These include tools to aid dungeon exploration such as a dungeon map navigator, and more obscure items, such as a text notifier and a music player.

== Plot ==
Five hundred years ago, the world of Granvallen was rocked by the Great Sorcery War. The Six Demon Lords, fallen angels who betrayed the twin goddesses Aplyes and Espina, attacked Granvallen and caused much destruction. Eventually they were defeated by the Holy Kingdom of Valence, who allied with the fairies and the great dragons. Afterwards magic was sealed; the magic gates linking the floating continents no longer worked and the continents lost contact with each other. In recent years, machinery has prospered and now the people of Granvallen can move freely using aircraft.

Ragna Valentine is a treasure hunter who journeys to the north-western continent of Ilvard to fulfil a job contract. As he enters Ilvard's airspace, he is shot down by a mysterious group and plunges to an imminent death. Fortunately he is rescued by Alwen, a vampire princess who performs a blood contract with him. Ragna becomes Alwen's Blood Warrior and instantly recovers from his fatal injuries due to his newly gained supernatural strength. When they meet again, Alwen explains that her home castle and magic were stolen from her by an unknown enemy and requests Ragna to help her reclaim them.

== Reception ==
Reception

Aggregate score
Aggregator	Score
Metacritic	79/100

Review scores
Publication	Score
RPG Site	7/10
RPG Fan	80/100

The game received generally favorable reviews.
