= Yasunori Nishiki =

Japanese composer (born 1985)

Yasunori Nishiki 西木 康智
- Also known as: Vivian
- Born: July 10, 1985 (age 41); Kanagawa Prefecture, Japan
- Genres: Orchestral; progressive rock; symphonic rock; ambient; video game music
- Occupations: Composer; arranger
- Instruments: Keyboard; synthesizer
- Website: yasunorinishiki.com

Yasunori Nishiki (西木 康智, Nishiki Yasunori; born July 10, 1985) is a Japanese composer, best known for his work on the Octopath Traveler video game series. He formerly worked for Konami and has produced soundtracks for video games and anime.

== Biography ==
Nishiki was born on July 10, 1985, in Kanagawa Prefecture. He started taking piano lessons when he was a child, but became interested in music when he became a fan of the Japanese band Spitz. After which, he bought some sheet music for their songs and began to write his own compositions on the piano. After graduating from Tokyo College of Music, he began to work as a music composer for Konami, and worked on titles such as Quiz Magic Academy series, and arranged the national anthems for Pro Evolution Soccer 2011, which are also used in the further installments in the series. He had also produced several tracks for various music video game series such as Reflec Beat, Pop'n Music, and Jubeat under the alias Vivian.

He left Konami to pursue his career as a freelancer, and began to expand his works for various non-gaming projects such as anime and puppet shows. His first major project was the soundtrack for the video game Octopath Traveler; the soundtrack received positive reception from critics and fans, and was nominated for "Best Score/Music" at The Game Awards 2018. It has spawned many arrangement albums and has also been performed live in concerts. He would later work on the anime Azur Lane, and Princess Connect! Re:Dive.

He has collaborated with Kohei Tanaka as a synthesizer programmer for several of his works, including Gravity Rush 2 and One Piece.

== Works ==
=== Video games ===
Year	Title	Note(s)	Ref(s)
2010	Quiz Magic Academy VII	with various others	
2010	Pro Evolution Soccer 2011	arranged the national anthems	
2011	Quiz Magic Academy VIII	with various others	
2011	Frontier Gate	with Naoyuki Sato, Masato Nakayama, and Junpei Fujita	
2012	NeverDead	with various others	
2012	Quiz Magic Academy: Kenja no Tobira	with various others	
2012	Reflec Beat Colette -Winter-	"guerre à outrance"	
2012	Monster Retsuden Oreca Battle	with various others	
2012	Pop'n Music Sunny Park	"Haitoku to jaaku no epitaph"	
2012	Jubeat Saucer	two tracks	
2013	Dragon Collection		
2013	Reflec Beat Colette -Summer-	"Legendary Dragon"	
2013	Beatmania IIDX 21: Spada	"Shattered control"	
2015	Otocadoll	"Sen no Komorebi"	
2015	Lord of Vermilion Arena	arrangements	
2016	Show by Rock!!	"My Precious Sign"	
2016	Quiz RPG: The World of Mystic Wiz	with various others	
2016	Endride: X Fragments	with various others	
2016	Fate/Extella: The Umbral Star	"ex:tella"	
2017	Gravity Rush 2	synthesizer	
2017	Terra Battle 2	arrangements with various others	
2018	Princess Connect! Re:Dive	with various others	
2018	Octopath Traveler		
2019	Kingdom Hearts III	arrangements with various others	
2019	Rakugaki Kingdom	"Spectrum Seeker"	
2019	Renshin Astral	Kyoto battle themes	
2019	Sakura Wars	arranged "Kurui Sake Teito ni"	
2020	Granblue Fantasy Versus	with Tsutomu Narita, Hidenori Maezawa, and Nao Tokisawa	
2020	Final Fantasy VII Remake	with various others	
2020	Octopath Traveler: Champions of the Continent		
2021	Uma Musume Pretty Derby	with various others	
2021	Solomon Program	with Rina Yugi	
2022	Yu-Gi-Oh! Master Duel		
2023	Octopath Traveler II		
2023	Sin Chronicle	"Trigger of Fate"	
2023	Granblue Fantasy Versus: Rising	with Tsutomu Narita, Hidenori Maezawa, and Nao Tokisawa	
2024	Final Fantasy VII Rebirth	arrangements with various others	
2025	Octopath Traveler 0		

=== Anime / television ===
Year	Title	Note(s)	Ref(s)
2016	Endride	synthesizer	
2017	Granblue Fantasy The Animation	with Nobuo Uematsu and Tsutomu Narita	
2019	Azur Lane		
2019	Granblue Fantasy The Animation 2	with Tsutomu Narita	
2020	Princess Connect! Re:Dive	with various others	
2022	Black Rock Shooter: Dawn Fall	with Shingo Nishimura and Ren Tsukagoshi	
2022	Shine Post	with Tsubasa Ito	
2023	Dragons of Wonderhatch	with Hisaki Kato and Kana Inukai	

=== Other ===
Year	Title	Note(s)	Ref(s)
2014	Oreca Omaeca Genkai Battle!! / Akira Kushida	"Kessen! Burning"	
2015	El Mundo / Risa Minami	synthesizer on "Moroha no Tsurugi"	
2015	Music College Alumni Joint Volunteer Project: Work Collection 1	"SeTsuNa"	
2016	Izayoi Bonboriuta / Tsurezurenaru Ayatsuri Mugenan	arranged "Gensou yo Sake"	
2018	Canvas / Risa Minami	"Yoake no Ane Mosu"	
2019	Kingdom Hearts Orchestra -World of Tres-	arranged "Overture to the Decisive Battle"	
2019	Octopath Traveler Arrangements Break & Boost -Extend-		
2020	Reknowing / Lena Raine	"Light Rail (Yasunori Nishiki Remix)"	
2020	Final Fantasy VII Remake Acoustic Arrangements	with various others	
2021	Merregnon: Land of Silence	arrangements	
2023	Final Fantasy Series Acoustic Arrangements	arranged "Battle With the Four Fiends"	
2023	Genshin Concert 2023 - Melodies of an Endless Journey	music director	
2024	Octopath Traveler Orchestral Arrangements -To Travel is to Live-	supervisor	
