= HD-2D =

Video game art style

HD-2D or HD2D is a video game art style and perspective that combines traditional two-dimensional elements, such as pixel art and billboard sprites, with fully three-dimensional environments. The style makes extensive use of modern rendering effects, including dynamic lighting, depth of field, and tilt-shift, which together produce a diorama-like appearance that evokes the look of classic role-playing video games (RPGs) while incorporating contemporary visual techniques.

The term was coined and trademarked by Square Enix to describe the visuals of its 2018 role-playing game Octopath Traveler, developed in collaboration with Acquire. The company subsequently adopted the branding for additional titles, including Triangle Strategy and remakes of Live A Live and Dragon Quest, and announced further projects using the style such as Octopath Traveler 0 and The Adventures of Elliot: The Millennium Tales. Although Square Enix holds a trademark on the name, independent developers and other studios have produced games with comparable aesthetics, such as Wandering Sword and Eiyuden Chronicle: Hundred Heroes.

Critical and fan reception to the style has been broadly positive, with commentators praising its ability to modernize the look of 16-bit RPGs while maintaining a sense of authenticity. Reviewers have described it as one of the most striking contemporary visual approaches in the genre. It has been noted for its influence on remake strategy within the company and its role in inspiring a wider retro revival in video games. Some commentators have expressed concern that its repeated use by Square Enix could lead to fatigue.

== Origins and development ==
=== Conception at Square Enix ===
HD-2D art style in Octopath Traveler. 16-bit sprites are integrated into fully 3D environments. Point lighting allows characters to cast shadows, while post-processing shaders and modern particle effects enhance the retro-inspired visuals and provide a sense of depth.

The HD-2D art style was created by Square Enix's development team led by Tomoya Asano within Creative Business Unit II (known as "Team Asano"), in collaboration with Acquire during the early stages of development of Octopath Traveler. According to producer Tomoya Asano, the project was intended from the beginning to use pixel art, but with a presentation distinct from traditional 2D games. Early game prototypes made use of sprite assets from Final Fantasy VI while the team experimented with lighting effects, as explained by 2D pixel designer Shizuka Morimoto. Initially, the style focused on adding dramatic lighting to 2D graphics, but Asano encouraged the team to develop visuals that could justify a full-priced game. Morimoto then began incorporating 3D elements, which provided a sense of depth, while Asano emphasized the use of lighting and shadow to highlight how light interacts with pixel-based environments. Asano explained that it took about a month and a half to achieve a look that was "a cut above other modern pixel games." Assistant producer Masaaki Hayasaka recalls that rather than choosing the right art style for Octopath Traveler, the team had to come up with various concepts for the game that could match the new style. According to Acquire’s lead programmer, the team relied heavily on Unreal Engine 4 (UE4) to build a robust game with a relatively small staff. Along with the visual effects, the team added a point light into the scene that would cause characters to cast shadows onto the environment to make the light and shadow visual effects more impressive to players. Digital Trends attributes the origins of HD-2D to the popularity of pixel art games like Shovel Knight and Axiom Verge in the mid-2010s, combined with the desires of Square Enix developers to recreate the style of the pixel-based RPGs they grew up with.

=== Branding and trademarks ===
The term HD-2D was officially used by Square Enix during the promotion of Octopath Traveler. Following the game’s release, Square Enix sought to formalize the branding of the art style. Square Enix filed trademarks for the terms HD-2D and HD2D in Europe and Japan in January 2019, six months after the release of Octopath Traveler; While Eurogamer was critical of this move, it and other news outlets predicted that the term and aesthetic would be used by the company in future titles. In 2024, Masaaki Hayasaka, who also produced Dragon Quest III HD-2D Remake, told Bloomberg that HD-2D was an uncertain topic among Square Enix's executives as they did not want to oversaturate the market with the art style but also wanted the Dragon Quest series to stay "vibrant and robust".

== Characteristics ==
Square Enix's HD-2D style is characterized by the combination of two-dimensional game design elements, specifically pixel art character sprites and billboards, placed within a three-dimensional game world. Typically, a point light source is placed into the scene to make characters and objects cast shadows. Several modern post-processing effects and shaders like tilt-shift, depth of field, bloom, volumetric lighting and fog, and particle effects are added, and combined with parallax scrolling, give the game a more modern feel.

=== Related styles ===
HD-2D shares many characteristics with the classic 2.5D style, combining pixel character sprites with 3D environments; however, it enhances the traditional approach with detailed textures and dynamic shading enabled by modern game engines. Unlike games using the traditional 2.5D approach, HD-2D games feature backgrounds that are entirely rendered in 3D and often make use of complex camerawork.

== Use in video games ==
Since its introduction in Octopath Traveler, Square Enix has employed the art style in both original titles and remakes. While Square Enix retains the trademark for the term "HD-2D", they do not own the overall art style. When asked in 2022 why he believed other developers had not incorporated HD-2D into their games, Tomoya Asano stated that it was more expensive than people realize and that other companies might not gain much from copying the style. Nevertheless, a small number of independent and third-party developers have adopted the aesthetics in their games.

=== Square Enix titles ===
Square Enix has used the art style in all games of the Octopath Traveler series—Octopath Traveler, Octopath Traveler II, Octopath Traveler: Champions of the Continent, Octopath Traveler 0—and a range of other games, including Triangle Strategy, as well as the remakes for Live A Live, Dragon Quest III and Dragon Quest I & II. The Adventures of Elliot: The Millennium Tales also featured the art style.

=== Non-Square Enix titles ===
The 2023 role-playing game Wandering Sword featured an art style reminiscent of HD-2D. In 2024, the RPG Eiyuden Chronicle: Hundred Heroes released with a similar art style, causing news outlets to draw comparisons to HD-2D. The upcoming JRPG SacriFire employs the aesthetic as well. Haruyuki Ohashi of Acquire stated that he had considered using HD-2D graphics for Mario & Luigi: Brothership early on in development.

In March 2026, Gotcha Gotcha Games announced that they would add an HD-2D style "P2D" (Perspective 2D) map system to their upcoming game development program RPG Maker U2U, which previously only supported 2D.

== Reception and legacy ==
Most critical responses to the HD-2D art style are tied to the games that it accompanies. However, some critics have directly voiced their opinions on the style itself. Many of them praise HD-2D for its ability to respect and complement the original vision of retro games, while others feel it might be overused. Its implementation in the remake of Dragon Quest III contributed to it becoming one of the best-selling games of 2024 in Japan.

Oli Welsh of Polygon calls HD-2D a "gorgeous style" that is an "extension of a classic '90s video game aesthetic" that enables a remake to stay "faithful to its original character." DualShockers's Chris Littlechild expressed that the art style had lost its appeal due to Square Enix's overuse of it in 2025. Scott McCrae of GamesRadar+ and Matt Karoglou of Game Rant are both hoping for a possible HD-2D remake of Chrono Trigger. Their hopes follow Square Enix's acknowledgment of the game's impact for its 30-year-anniversary and comments made by Masaaki Hayasaka at Gamescom 2025. Hayasaka suggested that if HD-2D games are "really well regarded," higher-ups at Square Enix might consider applying the art style to more remakes in the future. In response to fan-created videos depicting Pokémon in HD-2D, Gaming Respawn's Aiden Crawford praised the aesthetic's ability to create a "beautiful and immersive look" that blends the nostalgia of retro games with modern techniques of 3D rendering. Another critic stated that Square Enix has "opened up a veritable Pandora's box of prospective new games" as a result of HD-2D's conception. TheGamer's Sam Woods called Octopath Traveler's HD-2D "one of the coolest art styles gaming has ever seen."

Octopath Traveler received critical acclaim on the basis of its art style when it pioneered HD-2D in 2018. Subsequent Square Enix releases have enjoyed similar critical praise. Its implementation into the Dragon Quest III remake has been called an "absolute perfect combination" by IGN. Dragon Quest 3 HD-2D Remake became the second best-selling video game of 2024 in Japan. Critics called the look of the 2025 remake of Dragon Quest I & II "even better".

In March 2025, Nintendo filed a patent for a method of creating 3D games that utilize 2D-inspired elements in order to achieve a "look similar to older 2D games." The technique outlined in the patent has been compared to HD-2D due to its similarities; Nintendo's Paper Mario series utilizes a similar technique to HD-2D.
