= Octopath Traveler =

2018 video game

- Packaging artwork, featuring the game's eight main-characters
- Developers: Square Enix Business Division 11; Acquire
- Publisher: Square Enix (Note: Nintendo published the Nintendo Switch version outside of Japan until December 2023.)
- Director: Keisuke Miyauchi
- Producers: Tomoya Asano; Masashi Takahashi
- Designer: Kota Oosaki
- Programmers: Satoshi Hasegawa; Yutaka Watanbe
- Artists: Naoki Ikushima; Mika Iizuka
- Writer: Kakunoshin Futsuzawa
- Composer: Yasunori Nishiki
- Series: Octopath Traveler
- Engine: Unreal Engine 4
- Platforms: Nintendo Switch; Windows; Stadia; Xbox One; PlayStation 4; PlayStation 5; Nintendo Switch 2
- Release: July 13, 2018: Nintendo Switch; July 13, 2018; Windows; June 7, 2019; Stadia; April 28, 2020; Xbox One; March 25, 2021; PS4, PS5; June 5, 2024; Nintendo Switch 2; JP: July 13, 2026; WW: October 1, 2026
- Genre: Role-playing
- Mode: Single-player

Octopath Traveler (Note: OCTOPATH TRAVELLER(オクトパス トラベラー) (Okutopasu Toraberā)) is a 2018 role-playing video game developed by Square Enix in collaboration with Acquire. Utilizing an "HD-2D" visual style, the game follows the stories of eight playable characters as they venture through the fantasy world of Orsterra.

The game was released for the Nintendo Switch in July 2018, for Windows in June 2019, for Stadia in April 2020, for Xbox One in March 2021, and for PlayStation 4 and PlayStation 5 in June 2024. It received generally favorable reviews, with praise for its presentation, music, and battle system, while its story received more mixed responses. The game had sold over 3 million copies worldwide by September 2022.

A prequel, Octopath Traveler: Champions of the Continent, launched for Android and iOS in 2020 in Japan, followed by a worldwide release in 2022. A sequel, Octopath Traveler II, was released in 2023. Octopath Traveler 0, a console adaptation of Champions of the Continent, was released December 4, 2025.

The game was also released for Nintendo Switch 2, alongside its sequel, in July 2026 in Japan, with worldwide release of both games scheduled for October of the same year.

== Gameplay ==
Octopath Traveler features an aesthetic termed "HD-2D" by the developers.

Octopath Traveler features a graphical aesthetic known as "HD-2D", defined by the developers as combining retro Super NES-style character sprites and textures with polygonal environments and high-definition effects.

Players start the game by choosing a protagonist from one of eight adventurers, each of whom begins their journey in different parts of the world. Once a protagonist character is chosen, they cannot be removed from the active party until their story arc, which consists of four chapters, is concluded. Characters not chosen as the protagonist may be recruited at their starting locations.

Each character is paired with a distinct character class ("job"). It cannot be altered through gameplay. However, players can unlock the ability to assign a different character's class as a "subjob," which can be changed at any time but can only be assigned to one character at a time.

Each player character has a unique "Path Action" command that can be used when interacting with NPCs: The Warrior Olberic and the Hunter H'aanit can challenge characters; the Apothecary Alfyn and the Scholar Cyrus can inquire about certain bits of information that can be used for completion of quests or in the form of hidden items; the Merchant Tressa and the Thief Therion can acquire items directly from NPCs, one via commerce and the other via pickpocketing; and the Cleric Ophilia and the Dancer Primrose can guide NPCs and use them as guest summons. In all cases, the first action is a "Noble" Path Action: the ability's effectiveness dependent by the character's level or amount of in-game currency. The others are "Rogue" actions, which can be used on anyone but carries a risk of its user losing credibility with other NPCs. When the player loses enough reputation in a given town, they can no longer use any Path Actions in that town until a fee has been paid to restore the party's reputation.

The game features a turn-based battle system. All characters can attack with weapons, use abilities, use consumable items, and flee. The battle system is oriented around two features, "Break and Boost".

- Every foe comes with a set number of "Shield Points" and a series of weaknesses, which are revealed when the party first encounters that foe. Weaknesses correspond to one of the six different kinds of weapons, or six elemental attacks, in the game. If an enemy is struck, using something it is vulnerable to, an equal or greater number of times than it has Shield Points, the enemy is "Broken;" it loses its next turn and takes increased damage. However, once it gets a turn, it is guaranteed to act before the player does, preventing the player from locking it.
- Each party member receives a Boost Point at the beginning of every turn, and may store up to five at a time. During their turn, a player can use up to three Boost Points to either strike with their weapons multiple times or increase the potency of an ability. A Boost Point is not gained the turn after using them.

== Synopsis ==
Octopath Traveler is set in the land of Orsterra, which was created by thirteen deities. One of them, the fallen god Galdera, was sealed away within the afterworld by the other deities after he refused to relinquish what they created. The Order of the Sacred Flame, the continent's dominant church, formed to worship the leader of the non-fallen gods, which continue to preside over Orsterra.

The player follows the stories of eight heroes as they journey through Orsterra.

- Ophilia Clement, a priestess of the Sacred Flame, undertakes a religious pilgrimage to keep the Sacred Flame burning. She is opposed by Mattias, who attempts to steal the Sacred Flame for his own ends. Ophilia's character class, Cleric, allows her to heal and defend the party.
- Cyrus Albright, a teacher at the Royal Academy, attempts to recover a stolen tome of dark arts called From the Far Reaches of Hell. Cyrus is a Scholar and wields magical attack spells.
- Tressa Colzione, a merchant, is inspired to go see the world after acquiring a journal detailing someone's past travels throughout the continent. Tressa's character class, Merchant, allows her to maximize the gaining of money.
- Olberic Eisenberg, a former knight of the Kingdom of Hornburg, seeks renewed purpose after his kingdom was destroyed in an attack by a sellsword named Werner. A Warrior, Olberic excels at defending his allies from physical attacks.
- Primrose Azelhart, a dispossessed noblewoman, seeks revenge against the Obsidians, a criminal organization that murdered her father, led by her childhood friend Simeon. A Dancer, Primrose has the ability to temporarily strengthen her allies with magical dances.
- Alfyn Greengrass is a traveling healer who was inspired to take up the trade after a stranger, whose name he does not know, saved him from a terminal disease as a child. An Apothecary, Alfyn can "Concoct" by combining reagents for various offensive and defensive purposes.
- Therion, a criminal, is tasked by a noble family to recover a set of dragonstones stolen by Therion`s former partner-in-crime, Darius. a Thief, Therion can Steal items from enemies and NPCs, and also temporarily weaken them.
- H'aanit, a huntress, is tracking her mentor after he left their village to hunt a beast called Redeye. The Hunter class allows H'aanit a limited ability to snare and slow enemies. She can also "Capture" beasts for later use as helpers.

After progressing through all the characters' various stories, the heroes' quests become intermingled as Ophilia's enemy Mattias, Cyrus' enemy Lucia, the Obsidians, and Olberic’s enemy Werner are all revealed to have been under the employ of the immortal witch Lyblac. Revealed to be Galdera's daughter, Lyblac orchestrated the acquisition of From the Far Reaches of Hell and the dragonstones to unseal the Gate of Finis in order to access the afterworld; she also orchestrated the fall of Hornburg, as it stands atop the Gate. Using the Obsidians as her personal army to eliminate threats like Primrose's father, Lyblac also attempted to use Graham Crossford, the man who wrote Tressa's journal and saved Alfyn as a boy, as a vessel for Galdera to gain corporeal form due to his bloodline's ties to the god. Graham escaped from her clutches, but was mutated into H’aanit’s enemy Redeye. This forced Lyblac to seek out Graham's only living son Kit to complete the ritual.

At the Gate of Hornburg, Lyblac fully resurrects Galdera and is absorbed into him. The eight heroes fight a vicious battle against Galdera, sealing him back into the afterworld and saving Kit, who receives closure with his father's spirit.

== Development and release ==
Octopath Traveler was announced on January 13, 2017, under the working title of Project Octopath Traveler. The project was started by producers Masashi Takahashi and Tomoya Asano, who previously headed the Nintendo 3DS titles Bravely Default and Bravely Second: End Layer. Acquire was chosen as development partner for the game based on their previous work on the What Did I Do to Deserve This, My Lord? series. During the development process, various graphics options such as the depth, resolution, saturation, as well as other features such as whether water should be pixel or photorealistic are taken into consideration to perfect the "HD-2D" look. The eight main characters, four male and four female, are chosen to provide different party variations. All characters have different classes, and the character design, as well as the field commands, are based on different occupations in Medieval Europe. Each playable character is accompanied by unique themes during specifics sections of their story arcs. For example, Primrose's theme is intended to project a femininity that exudes sadness and melancholy. According to sound producer Yasunori Nishiki, the developers wanted to create a sense of wistfulness as well for her music theme even though her story is driven by revenge against her father's killers. Metallic sounds were incorporated into the theme to evoke a desert setting to reflect the beginning of Primrose's journey in the desert city of Sunshade.

The game's first public demo was released on the Nintendo eShop on September 13, 2017, For the demo, Olberic and Primrose were chosen to be the protagonists due to the relative proximity of their stories' starting points, and the developers wanted people to be able to recruit the other character after beating the story. Consideration was also given towards presenting the appeal of the game's mechanics through these characters. The second demo was released on June 14, 2018 and included various tweaks and improvements gathered from surveying players, along with all eight playable characters and save data transfer to the full game. The second demo consisted of the first chapters of each character's story, with certain areas blocked off to the player, and also had a three-hour play time limit.

Octopath Traveler was released worldwide on July 13, 2018. A special edition that includes the game's soundtrack, a replica of the game's in-game currency, a pop-up book, and a replica map of Orsterra was also released the same day. The game was released for Windows on June 7, 2019. A prequel for Android and iOS, titled Octopath Traveler: Conquerors of the Continent, was originally scheduled to be released in Japan in 2019, but was delayed to 2020. A Stadia version released on April 28, 2020. The game was released for Xbox One on March 25, 2021, and added to the Xbox Game Pass service on the same day. Versions for PlayStation 4 and PlayStation 5 were released on June 5, 2024. According to Takahashi, no downloadable content or other large post-release content updates are planned for the game.

The game was delisted from the Nintendo eShop for roughly a month between March and April 2024. Upon its return, Square Enix was listed as the publisher of the game, taking over from Nintendo, the original publisher.

On July 13, 2026, the Nintendo Switch 2 versions of Octopath Traveler and Octopath Traveler II were released in Japan. The worldwide release of Switch 2 versions of both games is scheduled for October 1 of the same year.

On October 8, 2026, the Windows version of Octopath Traveler released on GOG.com, alongside Octopath Traveler II and Neo: The World Ends With You.

== Reception ==
Reception

Aggregate score
Aggregator	Score
Metacritic	NS: 83/100; PC: 80/100

Review scores
Publication	Score
Destructoid	7.5/10
Famitsu	36/40
Game Informer	8/10
GameSpot	8/10
IGN	9.3/10
Nintendo Life	9/10
Nintendo World Report	9/10
VideoGamer.com	8/10

Octopath Traveler received "generally favorable" reception, according to review aggregator website Metacritic. Polygon's Jeremy Parish hailed the game as "the magical RPG the Nintendo Switch needed". GameSpot's Peter Brown praised the game for its "innovative battle system", character progression and presentation but found that the main drawbacks were the stories of the eight playable characters, which he described as "lackluster" and "repetitive".

The depiction of female characters in Octopath Traveler was met with a mixed response from critics. While some commentators singled out Primrose's story arc as a highlight of the game, others felt that it was cliched or mishandled due to its reliance on sexist tropes.

=== Sales ===
Square Enix issued two apologies after many in Japan were unable to purchase a physical copy due to stock shortages the week, and the following week, of its release. The game sold 188,238 physical copies within its first two months on sale in Japan, and placed at number one on the all-format sales chart. By August 2018, the game had sold over a million copies worldwide. As of March 2019, the combined physical and digital sales of the game have exceeded 1.5 million copies worldwide. The PC version was among the best-selling new releases of the month on Steam. (Note: Based on total revenue for the first two weeks on sale) Square Enix wrote in March 2020 that combined retail and digital sales of Octopath Traveler had surpassed two million copies. As of February 2021, the combined physical and digital sales of the game have exceeded 2.5 million copies worldwide. By September 2022, it was announced that the game had sold more than 3 million copies worldwide.

=== Awards ===
Year	Award	Category	Result	Ref.
2018	Game Critics Awards	Best RPG	Nominated	
2018	Golden Joystick Awards	Best Storytelling	Nominated	
2018	Golden Joystick Awards	Nintendo Game of the Year	Won	
2018	The Game Awards 2018	Best Art Direction	Nominated	
2018	The Game Awards 2018	Best Score/Music	Nominated	
2018	The Game Awards 2018	Best Role-Playing Game	Nominated	
2018	Gamers' Choice Awards	Fan Favorite Role Playing Game	Nominated	
2019	SXSW Gaming Awards	Excellence in Art	Won	
2019	SXSW Gaming Awards	Excellence in Musical Score	Nominated	
2019	SXSW Gaming Awards	Most Promising New Intellectual Property	Nominated	
2019	Famitsu Awards	Excellence Prize	Won	
2019	Famitsu Awards	Rookie Award	Won	
2019	Famitsu Awards	Best Game Music Award	Won	

== Sequel ==
A prequel for Android and iOS, Octopath Traveler: Champions of the Continent, was released in Japan in 2020 and worldwide in 2022. A sequel, Octopath Traveler II, was released for Nintendo Switch, PlayStation 4, PlayStation 5, and Windows on February 24, 2023. Octopath Traveler 0, a prequel based on the story of Champions of the Continent, was announced during a Nintendo Direct presentation, with a scheduled release date of December 4, 2025.

== Legacy ==
Square Enix has subsequently developed other games which follow the "HD-2D" style introduced with Octopath Traveler. These include Triangle Strategy and a remake of Live A Live, both of which released in 2022, as well as a remake of Dragon Quest III.

Additionally, Primrose and Olberic appear in Final Fantasy Record Keeper as part of a September 2018 crossover event.

The protagonists of the game were added to Octopath Traveler II as optional bosses in a June 2024 update. Additionally, Galdera, the final boss of the game, is a secret superboss on the main game.
