= Zwei: The Arges Adventure =

2001 video game

- Developer: Nihon Falcom
- Publishers: Nihon Falcom (PC, PSP); Taito (PS2); Xseed Games (Windows)
- Composer: Wataru Ishibashi
- Platforms: Windows, PlayStation 2, PlayStation Portable
- Release: Windows: JP: December 20, 2001; WW: January 25, 2018; PlayStation 2: JP: August 26, 2004; PlayStation Portable: JP: December 11, 2008
- Genre: Action role-playing
- Mode: Single-player

Zwei: The Arges Adventure (Note: Known in Japan as Zwei!! (ツヴァイ!!, Tsuvai!!).) is a 2001 action role-playing game developed by Nihon Falcom for Windows, PlayStation 2, and PlayStation Portable. An English version for Windows was released by Xseed Games in January 2018. A sequel, Zwei: The Ilvard Insurrection, was released in 2008.

In reference to the game's title, gameplay consists of alternating between two main characters, Pipiro and Pokkle. Pipiro is able to perform magical spells and techniques, while Pokkle executes only physical attacks. The game's plot centers around Pokkle and Pipiro and their quest to track down six goddess statues stolen from their village.

== Gameplay ==
The game is reminiscent of dungeon crawlers, but includes a larger focus on RPG elements and puzzles. Players control two characters, Pipiro and Pokkle, and can swap between them at any time. Pipiro launches magic at enemies, while Pokkle fights with a drill-like weapon. Both characters can utilise elemental attacks to target enemy weaknesses, with Pipiro's elemental spells also allowing access to new dungeon areas. Scoring multiple hits on enemies increase the drop rate of spoils and earns combo badges, which lets the player initiate combo attacks that damage the entire screen.

Players begin their adventure at Puck Village, where they can converse with NPC characters to gain clues to progress in their adventure. Immediately outside the village is the overworld of Arshes, where dungeons and other locations can be accessed. Dungeons are divided into several stages, with each stage possessing three floors. Many stages can be completed in different orders, although each stage offers a hint plate outside that shows the recommended Level to challenge it. At the end of each dungeon is a powerful dungeon boss who guards one of the goddess statues.

Exploring a dungeon (screenshot from the PSP version).

Instead of defeating enemies to level up like in most RPGs, experience points are gained by consuming food items, which are dropped by monsters and obtained through other methods. Ten of the same food item can be combined, at Puck Village's restaurant, to create a higher tier food item that awards more experience than the individual items. Early on, players can obtain a pet, ranging from various species of cats and dogs, who will follow the main characters, assisting in collecting items dropped by enemies. Letting pets tag along also unlocks the highest level combo attacks.

Beyond the main game, there are a number of special items that serve as desktop accessories and can operate while the main game is closed. The first accessory, obtained automatically, is the "Pet Monitor", a basic adventure game that stars the pet from the main game. Users can select one of two choices at various intervals, which can lead to the pet's level increasing or reward items in the main game. By default the game randomly makes choices and can progress without the user's influence. Other accessories include a calendar, clock, calculator, puzzle game "Mona Mona" and typing tutor "Typing of Ys". A shooting game called "Zwei!! Shooting" can also be accessed from the main game itself.

== Plot ==
Granvallen is a mysterious world of floating continents, where magic once prospered. Everything changed one thousand years ago, when mankind and demons fought in the Great Sorcery War. The war was instigated by the six demon lords, who opposed the twin goddesses Aplyes and Espina and attacked the world of Granvallen. After a period of five hundred years, the curtains of strife closed when Tiara, the Priestess Princess of the Holy Kingdom of Valence, and the heroic Crusader Paradys defeated Demon Lord Vesper at the floating continent of Arshes. Granvallen suffered many losses and the magical civilisation quickly faded away.

Five hundred years after the devastating battle, the world of Granvallen ushers in an age of peace and those who can wield magic are a rare sight to behold. A girl named Pipiro and a boy named Pokkle are two 14 year old children who live at the village of Puck, situated in the remote island continent of Arshes. One day, they spot a mysterious masked man enter the village's temple and decide to follow him. The man steals six Goddess statues, the village's treasures, with Pipiro and Pokkle unable to stop him. The pair decide to leave the village to retrieve the statues for their own reasons and thus their journey begins.

== Release ==
Zwei: The Arges Adventure originated as a Windows game and was later ported to the PS2 and PSP. The PS2 port was handled by Taito and is largely faithful to the original, but doesn't contain the "Typing of Ys" mini-game or any of the desktop applications. Furthermore, the sequence leading up to the final dungeon was modified, with the player required to complete four previously optional stages, now with reduced difficulty, before progressing. The PSP port by Falcom omits another mini-game, "Mona Mona", but includes character artwork during conversations, additional voice snippets and a re-arranged soundtrack option. The character artwork was also redone to fit in with the sequel's style.

== Reception ==
Reception

Aggregate score
Aggregator	Score
Metacritic	68/100

Review scores
Publication	Score
RPGamer	3.5/5
Digitally Downloaded	3.5/5
Meristation	6.5/10
RPG Site	6/10

== Sequels ==
Zwei!! Online, an online video game, was announced in 13 September 2007 at International Contents Creator's Convention. It was developed by Korean developer Neonsoft Corporation and Dream Media. The game took place 10 years after Pipiro and Pokkle's adventure in the first game. The developer ran a temporary closed beta service four times, from December 2007 to February 2012, before officially launching the game on 3 May 2012, published by Wemade Entertainment. The game's server was discontinued on 10 April 2013.
