= Bravely Default: Brilliant Lights =

2022 role-playing video game

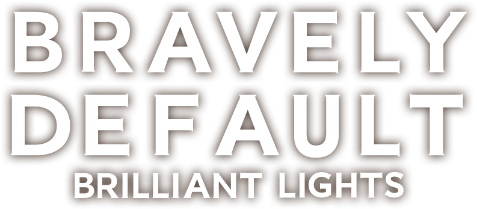
- Developer: Square Enix
- Publisher: Square Enix
- Artist: Raita Kazama
- Writer: Keiichi Ajiro
- Composers: Revo; Ryo
- Platforms: iOS, Android
- Release: JP: January 27, 2022
- Genre: Role-playing
- Mode: Single-player

Bravely Default: Brilliant Lights is a role-playing video game by Square Enix for iOS and Android. It is a spinoff in the Bravely Default series. It was released in Japan on January 27, 2022, with no announced plans for release in other regions.

== Gameplay ==
Bravely Default: Brilliant Lights is a mobile role-playing video game. It plays similarly to the console entries of the Bravely Default series, except for that it is free to play with in-app purchases. The game retains the series' turn based "Brave and Default" battle system, where all actions require units of "BP" to be used, and BP can be saved for a series of attacks at once. Character's from previous games can be encountered in the in-game plaza, and through engaging in conversations, can be recruited to help progress through the game. They are not locked behind gacha gameplay mechanics. While primarily a single player game, multiplayer cooperative battles with other players are also available.

== Story ==
The game takes place in a fictional setting where a occurrence called "The Blood Sands" is slowly spreading across the world, turning it into a wasteland. The game follows suit of the other Bravely games in focusing on a group of four heroes called the "Warriors of Light" - Claire, Steel, Sandra, and Rufus - as they travel the world with a fairy named Lumina to try to stop it. While all of the aforementioned characters are new to the game, characters from other entries in the Bravely series do make appearances. Tiz, Agnes, Edea, and Ringabel return from the original Bravely Default.

== Development ==
The game was announced on July 14, 2021, as part of the tenth anniversary celebrations for the release of the original Bravely Default game. It is the following mobile entry in the series after 2017's Bravely Default: Fairy's Effect. Pre-orders and pre-registrations open in November 2021. The game features key staff who had worked on the original Bravely Default game, including a story and setting created by Keiichi Ajiro and character design by Raita Kazama. The soundtrack reuses music composed by Revo and Ryo from the previous games, but the games' producer, Yohei Komtasu, expressed an interest in having Revo and Ryo make new music for major updates in the game. The game was released in Japan on January 27, 2022. To date, no releases in any other regions have been announced. In December 2022, it was announced that service would be ending on February 28, 2023, but that an offline version of the game would be released afterwards.

== Reception ==
The game has generally performed well, with Square Enix celebrating hitting a number of early registered player count achievements upon release, including hitting 2 million players after a few days of the game's release, 3 million registered players in the game's first week, and 4 million users in under 2 weeks.
