= Bravely Archive: D's Report =

2015 role-playing video game

- Developer: Square Enix
- Publisher: Square Enix
- Platforms: iOS, Android
- Release: JP: January 15, 2015; NA: October 25, 2018
- Genre: role-playing game
- Modes: Single-player, multiplayer

Bravely Archive: D's Report is a mobile video game released for iOS and Android devices. It ran from January 2015 to October 2017 in Japan. The game received a limited English release in North America in 2018.

== Gameplay ==
The game plays as a social JRPG. The player creates a team of character consisting of various roles and job classes, such as black mages for attack magic and white mages for healing, and fight computer-controlled opponents in turn-based battles. Certain moves have the effect of launching characters into the air, where "combos" that deal extra damage can be performed.

== Story ==
The game takes place in an alternate version of the world of Luxendarc - the setting of Bravely Default: Flying Fairy - hundreds years in the future. Adventurers called "Librarians" search the world for lost information sealed away from the world in crystals by an evil dragon. An opposing force called "Breakers" hinder these efforts. Many characters are descendants of characters from the original game, and sometimes share similar names, such as Oblige.

== Development ==
Bravely Archive: D's Journal was first announced in December 2014. The game launched in Japan in January 2015, and ran until it was shut down on October 23, 2017. Similar to how Square Enix used the social JRPG spinoff game Bravely Default: Praying Brage to promote the first entry in the Bravely Default series, Bravely Default: Flying Fairy, Bravely Archive was a spinoff tied to the promotion of the Japanese release of the sequel, Bravely Second. During the time of its Japanese run, there was no indication that the game would receive an English language release. Unexpectedly, a year after the game's Japanese termination, the game was surprise-released in English in North America.

== Reception ==
The game was a success in Japan, being downloaded over 5 million times in Japan by 2017. TouchArcade had mixed feelings on the title, stating that "there's not much separating it from other social RPGs aside from the Bravely Default IP, but for devoted fans...that just might be enough."
