= Final Fantasy Gaiden =

Final Fantasy Gaiden may refer to either of the two following video games:

- Final Fantasy Adventure, a 1991 Game Boy game released in Japan as Seiken Densetsu: Final Fantasy Gaiden
- Final Fantasy: The 4 Heroes of Light, a 2009 Nintendo DS game released in Japan as Hikari no 4 Senshi: Final Fantasy Gaiden
