= Various Daylife =

2019 role-playing video game

- Developer: DokiDoki Groove Works
- Publisher: Square Enix
- Producers: Tomoya Asano; Masaaki Hayasaka
- Artist: Naoki Ikushima
- Composer: Go Shiina
- Platforms: iOS (Apple Arcade), Nintendo Switch. Microsoft Windows, PlayStation 4, Android
- Release: iOS (Apple Arcade); September 19, 2019; Switch, Windows; September 13, 2022; PlayStation 4; September 16, 2022; iOS (Rerelease), Android; January 23, 2023
- Genre: Role-playing
- Mode: Single-player

Various Daylife is a role-playing video game developed by DokiDoki Groove Works and published by Square Enix. The game's development was led by key staff in charge of developing the Bravely Default and Octopath Traveler games. It was released on iOS, exclusively on their Apple Arcade service, in 2019 and on Nintendo Switch, Microsoft Windows and PlayStation 4 in 2022. It was re-released on iOS as a paid version named Various Daylife mobile with an Android release on January 23, 2023.

== Gameplay ==
Various Daylife plays as a simplified version for a console-styled JRPG. In it, the player plays as character traveling with a group of settlers on a new land, and joins an exploration team.

== Development ==
The game was first announced on September 10, 2019, at Apple's yearly iPhone event. The game was a launch title for the Apple Arcade paid-game service, which went live on September 19, 2019. The game's development was led by the same Square Enix staff responsible for creating the Bravely Default and Octopath Traveler games, including game designer and producer Tomoya Asano. Mfi controller support was added to the game in a March 2020 update. Similarly to those games, the key staff led another development team in its creation; in the instance of Various Daylife, they led the "DokiDoki Groove Works" developers. In July 2022, almost three years after its release, it was announced to be one of the first titles to be removed from the Apple Arcade service. In September 2022, it was released on the Nintendo Switch and Windows, with a PlayStation 4 release on September 16.

== Reception ==
Reception

Aggregate score
Aggregator	Score
Metacritic	NS: 63/100

Review scores
Publication	Score
Destructoid	6/10
Nintendo Life	6/10
RPGamer	2.5/5
RPGFan	74/100

Various Daylife received "mixed or average" reviews according to review aggregator Metacritic. TouchArcade singled it out as one of the highlights of the Apple Arcade service, in its weekly game update column, citing its "interesting battle system". Dedicated reviewers were less positive. Destructoid criticized the game for being "cumbersome", "lack[ing] polish", and "underdeveloped", but still conceded that it can "find ways to squeeze out a small amount of enjoyment from time to time as the world opens up". RPGamer agreed with the notion, concluding that it was hard to recommend playing or avoiding the game; they found the game fun to play in short 10 to 15 minute intervals, but bemoaned how long it would take to experience the game's 30+ hour campaign at that rate. Vice found it to be one of the worst titles available on the Apple Arcade, repeatedly calling it flat out a poorly developed game, even pondering if its main purpose was just a promotional effort to show that a major name in video games like Square Enix was buying into the then-new service.

All three reviewers noted that the game was more palatable when approached as a simple, casual mobile game than the big budget games Square Enix releases on home video game consoles. RPGamer and Vice criticized the interface for not making the best use of the game's screen, both positing that the game may have originally conceived to be played on Nintendo 3DS screens rather than smartphones and tablet screens. Destructoid and Vice felt that the game was at least an ideal candidate for the Apple Arcade subscription service; they felt it wasn't a great value proposition as a stand-alone game, but worked better when grouped into Apple Arcade's service, which allows players to play all of the games in the service for a monthly fee.
