= Geomerics =

Software companies of the United Kingdom

Geomerics Ltd.
- Type: Limited partnership
- Industry: Video games
- Founded: 2005
- Founder: Chris J. L. Doran
- Headquarters: Cambridge, Cambridgeshire, England
- Key people: Chris J. L. Doran (COO); Gary Lewis (CEO)
- Products: Enlighten
- Number of employees: 25 (2010)
- Website: Geomerics.com

Geomerics was a software company based in Cambridge, England, that specialised in creating lighting technology for the video game industry.

The company's main product was Enlighten, software code that calculates indirect lighting (radiosity) in real-time for live action games running on systems such as the PlayStation 3, PlayStation 4, Xbox 360, and personal computers. The company licensed this code to game companies for incorporation into their proprietary rendering engines. The software was ported to Nvidia's CUDA platform in 2011.

The first system to incorporate the middleware was the Frostbite 2 engine, created by the EA DICE studio, used in Battlefield 3 (2011) and Need for Speed: The Run (2011). Enlighten has also been licensed for a variety of other titles, including Eve Online, has an integration for Unreal Engine 3 & 4, and was built into Unity from version 5 to 2020 LTS.

Enlighten was later acquired by Silicon Studio.

== History ==
The company was formed by Angle PLC an LSE listed company (LSE:AGL) in 2005. The project was led by Chris J. L. Doran as a spin out from Cambridge University. Its chief executive included Gary Lewis, who prior to joining the company was the Global Chief Operating Officer at Take 2 Interactive in New York.

The development of Enlighten started in 2006 and saw major distribution with the release of Battlefield 3 in 2011 and updates to ongoing massively multiplayer online game Eve Online. According to the company, "Enlighten's revolutionary technology ensures that, for the first time, lighting can be updated in real time, in game, on today's consoles."

In December 2013 ARM, a Cambridge-based mobile CPU and GPU designer, acquired Geomerics, "for a number of reasons but foremost was Enlighten, Geomerics' award-winning technology for real-time lighting" said Dennis Laudick, ARM's vice president of partner marketing. The terms of the deal were not made public.

In July 2014, Geomerics was awarded £1 million from the United Kingdom's Technology Strategy Board (TSB) to take the company's real-time graphics capabilities from computer gaming to film-making.

== See also ==
- Silicon Studio
