= Gauge theory gravity =

Geometric algebra approach to gravity

Gauge theory gravity (GTG) is a theory of gravitation cast in the mathematical language of geometric algebra. To those familiar with general relativity, it is highly reminiscent of the tetrad formalism although there are significant conceptual differences. Most notably, the background in GTG is flat, Minkowski spacetime. The equivalence principle is not assumed, but instead follows from the fact that the gauge covariant derivative is minimally coupled. As in general relativity, equations structurally identical to the Einstein field equations are derivable from a variational principle. A spin tensor can also be supported in a manner similar to Einstein–Cartan–Sciama–Kibble theory. GTG was first proposed by Lasenby, Doran, and Gull in 1998 as a fulfillment of partial results presented in 1993. The theory has not been widely adopted by the rest of the physics community, who have mostly opted for differential geometry approaches like that of the related gauge gravitation theory.

== Mathematical foundation ==
The foundation of GTG comes from two principles. First, position-gauge invariance demands that arbitrary local displacements of fields not affect the physical content of the field equations. Second, rotation-gauge invariance demands that arbitrary local rotations of fields not affect the physical content of the field equations. These principles lead to the introduction of a new pair of linear functions, the position-gauge field and the rotation-gauge field. A displacement by some arbitrary function f

$$x \mapsto x'=f(x)$$

gives rise to the position-gauge field defined by the mapping on its adjoint,

$$\bar{\mathsf{h}}(a,x) \mapsto \bar{\mathsf{h}}'(a,x)=\bar{\mathsf{h}}(\bar{\mathsf{f}}^{-1}(a),f(x)),$$

which is linear in its first argument and a is a constant vector. Similarly, a rotation by some arbitrary rotor R gives rise to the rotation-gauge field

$$\bar{\mathsf{\Omega}}(a,x) \mapsto \bar{\mathsf{\Omega}}'(a,x)=R\bar{\mathsf{\Omega}}(a,x)R^{\dagger}-2a\cdot\nabla RR^{\dagger}.$$

We can define two different covariant directional derivatives

$$a \cdot D = a \cdot \bar{\mathsf{h}}(\nabla)+\tfrac{1}{2}\mathsf{\Omega}(\mathsf{h}(a))$$
$$a \cdot \mathcal{D} = a \cdot \bar{\mathsf{h}}(\nabla)+\mathsf{\Omega}(\mathsf{h}(a)) \times$$

or with the specification of a coordinate system

$$D_{\mu} = \partial_{\mu}+\tfrac{1}{2}\Omega_{\mu}$$
$$\mathcal{D}_{\mu} = \partial_{\mu}+\Omega_{\mu} \times ,$$

where × denotes the commutator product.

The first of these derivatives is better suited for dealing directly with spinors whereas the second is better suited for observables. The GTG analog of the Riemann tensor is built from the commutation rules of these derivatives.

$$[D_{\mu},D_{\nu}]\psi=\tfrac{1}{2}\mathsf{R}_{\mu\nu}\psi$$
$$\mathcal{R}(a \wedge b)=\mathsf{R}(\mathsf{h}(a \wedge b))$$

== Field equations ==
The field equations are derived by postulating the Einstein–Hilbert action governs the evolution of the gauge fields, i.e.

$$S = \int  \left[ {1 \over 2\kappa} \left( \mathcal{R} - 2 \Lambda \right) + \mathcal{L}_\mathrm{M} \right] (\det\mathsf{h})^{-1} \, \mathrm{d}^4 x.$$

Minimizing variation of the action with respect to the two gauge fields results in the field equations

$$\mathcal{G}(a)-\Lambda a=\kappa \mathcal{T}(a)$$
$$\mathcal{D} \wedge \bar{\mathsf{h}}(a) = \kappa \mathcal{S} \cdot \bar{\mathsf{h}}(a),$$

where $\mathcal{T}$ is the covariant energy–momentum tensor and $\mathcal{S}$ is the covariant spin tensor. Importantly, these equations do not give an evolving curvature of spacetime but rather merely give the evolution of the gauge fields within the flat spacetime.

== Relation to general relativity ==
For those more familiar with general relativity, it is possible to define a metric tensor from the position-gauge field in a manner similar to tetrads. In the tetrad formalism, a set of four vectors $\{{e_{(a)}}^{\mu}\}$ are introduced. The Greek index μ is raised or lowered by multiplying and contracting with the spacetime's metric tensor. The parenthetical Latin index (a) is a label for each of the four tetrads, which is raised and lowered as if it were multiplied and contracted with a separate Minkowski metric tensor. GTG, roughly, reverses the roles of these indices. The metric is implicitly assumed to be Minkowski in the selection of the spacetime algebra. The information contained in the other set of indices gets subsumed by the behavior of the gauge fields.

We can make the associations

$$g_{\mu}=\mathsf{h}^{-1}(e_{\mu})$$
$$g^{\mu}=\bar{\mathsf{h}}(e^{\mu})$$

for a covariant vector and contravariant vector in a curved spacetime, where now the unit vectors $\{e_{\mu}\}$ are the chosen coordinate basis. These can define the metric using the rule

$$g_{\mu \nu}=g_{\mu} \cdot g_{\nu}.$$

Following this procedure, it is possible to show that for the most part the observable predictions of GTG agree with Einstein–Cartan–Sciama–Kibble theory for non-vanishing spin and reduce to general relativity for vanishing spin. GTG does, however, make different predictions about global solutions. For example, in the study of a point mass, the choice of a "Newtonian gauge" yields a solution similar to the Schwarzschild metric in Gullstrand–Painlevé coordinates. General relativity permits an extension known as the Kruskal–Szekeres coordinates. GTG, on the other hand, forbids any such extension.
