= Chris J. L. Doran =

British physicist

Chris J. L. Doran is a physicist, Director of Studies in Natural Sciences for Sidney Sussex College, Cambridge. He founded Geomerics, and is its Chief Operating Officer.

Doran obtained his Ph.D. in 1994 on the topic of Geometric Algebra and its Application to Mathematical Physics. He was an EPSRC Advanced Fellow from 1999 to 2004. In 2004, he became Enterprise Fellow of the Royal Society of Edinburgh.

Doran has been credited, together with Anthony N. Lasenby, Joan Lasenby and Steve Gull, for raising the interest of the physics community to the mathematical language and methods of geometric algebra and geometric calculus. These had been rediscovered and refined by David Hestenes, who built on the fundamental work of William Kingdon Clifford and Hermann Grassmann. In 1998, together with Lasenby and Gull, he proposed the gauge theory gravity.

Doran derived a coordinate system for a rotating (Kerr) black hole suited to freely-falling observers, analogous to Gullstrand–Painlevé coordinates for the non-rotating case (Schwarzschild spacetime). This is useful for solving the Dirac equation on a Kerr background.

He took a break from academics in 2005, and he subsequently founded the software company Geomerics, making use of his knowledge of mathematics. His research interests relate to applied mathematics and theoretical physics, in particular quantum theory, gravitation, geometric algebra and computational geometry.

Doran has authored more than 50 scientific papers.

== Publications ==
Books

- Chris J. L. Doran, Anthony N. Lasenby: Geometric Algebra for Physicists, Cambridge University Press, 2003, ISBN 0-521-48022-1
- Leo Dorst, Chris J. L. Doran, Joan Lasenby: Applications of geometric algebra in computer science and engineering, Birkhäuser, 2002, ISBN 0-8176-4267-6
- Chris J. L. Doran: Geometric Algebra and its Application to Mathematical Physics, Sidney Sussex College, Dissertation submitted for the degree of Doctor of Philosophy in the University of Cambridge, February 1994

Selected articles and book chapters

- C. J. L. Doran, A. N. Lasenby, S. F. Gull, S. Somaroo, A. D. Challinor: Spacetime algebra and electron physics, Measurement, vol. 5, 2005, arXiv: quant-ph/0509178, abstract
- Timothy F. Havel, Chris J. L. Doran: Geometric algebra in quantum information processing, American Mathematical Society, 2002
- Timothy F. Havel, Chris J. L. Doran: Geometric algebra in quantum information processing. In: Samuel J. Lomonaco, Jr., and Howard E. Brandt (eds.): Quantum Computation and Information, Contemporary Mathematics, American Mathematical Society, AMS Special Session Quantum Computation and Information, January 19–21, 2000, pp. 81–100, abstract
