= Bravely Default: Praying Brage =

2012 role-playing video game

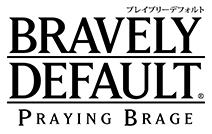
- Developer(s): NHN Hangame
- Publisher(s): Square Enix
- Platform(s): Web browser
- Release: JP: November 1, 2012
- Mode(s): Single-player, multiplayer

Bravely Default: Praying Brage is a Japanese web browser video game developed by NHN Hangame and published by Square Enix. The game is a spinoff in the Bravely Default series, and a tie-in to the Japanese release of the original game in the series, Bravely Default: Flying Fairy, being released a month after its release in November 2012.

== Gameplay ==
The game is generally described as a social JRPG. The game begins by the player choosing which of the four factions they will join - fire, earth, water, or wind. Locations on the world map can be chosen by the player, which leads to engaging into turn-based JRPG style, though not with the same "Brave" and "Default" functions found in most console entries in the Bravely Default series. Experience, items, and money earned can be used to upgrade characters through better equipment, better moves, and a job class system that can further customize characters. The game is free to play with real-life timers; after a certain number battles occur, the player must either pay with real money to continue, or wait a few hours to play again.

== Story ==
The game takes place in the same universe of the original Bravely Default game, Bravely Default: Flying Fairy, but 200 years in the future. free to play The game's four battling factions of fire, earth, water, and wind represent the descendants of the four element crystals from Flying Fairy. The game's main character is Edea Lee Oblige, who shares the name of two main characters from Flying Fairy as well, Agnes Oblige and Edea Lee.

== Development and reception ==
The game was first announced in late October 2012, in an issue of Famitsu as a web browser spinoff game to the original Bravely Default game. The game was developed by NHN Hangame and published by Square Enix. Its name, Bravely Default: Praying Brage, is an allusion to the term "brage", which is Japanese shorthand for "browser game". An open beta of the game was launched on November 1, 2012, in Japan, a month after the release of the original Bravely Default game. While no international or English version was ever released, the game was playable in the West, albeit in Japanese.

In July 2013, Square Enix announced that the game had accumulated over 400,000 players since the game's launch. Concurrently, plans to release further content for the game, including voice acting and new characters classes, were announced. One of said classes, the pope class, was later used in Bravely Second years later. Across 2013 and 2014, the game had two separate character cross-over events where guest characters from other game were available in Praying Brage; first from the original Bravely Default game, and later from Square Enix's Lord of Vermilion III game. The game garnered a strong following in Japan, between its userbase, and its popularity with Japanese bloggers, including one who spent the equivalent of over $40,000 on the free to play game. While the title received relatively little attention in the West due to a lack of an English language release, Kotaku was generally positive about the game, concluding that it was "...a far more complicated browser game than one would believe at first glance with many different jobs, characters, items, and a PVP conflict between the four sides...however, like many free games of this nature, it suffers by limiting the time you can spend with it without paying. Still, if you need some more turn-based battles in your life, there are far worse places to go than Bravely Default: Praying Brage."
