= Bravely Default II =

2021 role-playing video game

- Promotional artwork
- Developer: Claytechworks
- Publishers: Nintendo Switch; JP: Square Enix; WW: Nintendo; Windows; WW: Square Enix
- Director: Shunsuke Iwami
- Producers: Tomoya Asano; Masashi Takahashi
- Designer: Shota Fukubaru
- Programmer: Kei Sone
- Artists: Hajime Onuma; Naoki Ikushima
- Writers: Yura Kubota; Tomoyoshi Nagai
- Composer: Revo
- Engine: Unreal Engine 4
- Platforms: Nintendo Switch; Windows
- Release: Nintendo Switch; February 26, 2021; Windows; September 2, 2021
- Genre: Role-playing
- Mode: Single-player

Bravely Default II is a role-playing video game developed by Claytechworks and published by Square Enix. It was released worldwide for the Nintendo Switch on February 26, 2021, with Nintendo publishing the game on the platform outside of Japan, and was released for Windows on September 2, 2021. It is the third main installment in the Bravely series, following the original Bravely Default and its direct sequel Bravely Second: End Layer, both originally released on the Nintendo 3DS. It features a separate story, setting, and cast of characters.

The game's story follows Seth, a young sailor who is swept ashore in a foreign kingdom after a storm. There, he encounters Gloria, a princess seeking to protect four elemental crystals from hostile forces; Elvis, a scholar searching for an ancient, mysterious book; and Adelle, a mercenary with her own goals. Together, they undertake a journey across the game's world, confronting powerful adversaries as they attempt to recover the crystals and restore balance to the world of Excillant.

Bravely Default II was released to generally positive critical reception, with praise towards the game's unique visual style, dramatic soundtrack, and its innovative additions to the traditional JRPG turn-based battle formula, but criticism towards its high difficulty level and balance with some critics also considering the game's plot to be predictable. As of December 2021, publisher Square Enix confirmed that it had sold more than one million units on both platforms.

== Gameplay ==
Bravely Default II is the third main game in the Bravely series, following the original game Bravely Default and its sequel Bravely Second: End Layer. While Second was a direct story continuation from the original, Bravely Default II features a new story and cast of characters. Similar to prior titles, the game plays as a role-playing video game with turn-based battles.

The game contains an updated variant of the prior games' "Brave Point" system and uses collecting different "asterisks" to change a character's job class. Bravely Default II features turn-based combat that builds on the series’ signature "brave" and "default" systems. Players can choose to "default" during their turn, which allows them to defend and accumulate Brave Points (BP), or "brave," using stored BP to perform multiple actions in a single turn. This system encourages strategic decision-making, as players must weigh the benefits of conserving actions against the potential rewards of unleashing them all at once. Compared to previous titles, Bravely Default II introduces improved job customization, enhanced visuals, and refined battle mechanics, offering players more flexibility and depth in character development and strategy.

== Plot ==
Bravely Default II is set in a new world from prior games, on a continent named Excillant divided into five different kingdoms. The game follows four main characters; a mysterious young sailor named Seth, a refugee princess named Gloria, a traveling scholar named Elvis, and a mercenary named Adelle. The party sets off across the continent to retrieve the crystals of the four elements. These crystals were stolen from Gloria's destroyed homeland of Musa. Meanwhile, Elvis is trying to decipher an ancient book that cannot be read under normal circumstances, but occasionally reveals secrets of the past when it comes into contact with an Asterisk, which are powerful magical gems that grant knowledge and power. The book doubles as the system the player uses to save their progress.

During their travels, the four become this age's Heroes of Light, fighting to prevent the misuse of the crystals by warriors of the Kingdom of Holograd, its leader Adam, and his advisor Edna. Periodically throughout the world's history, an ancient evil called the Night's Nexus must be sealed away, and the crystals choose four warriors to do so. Seth is chosen by the Wind Crystal, Gloria by the Water Crystal, Elvis by the Earth Crystal, and Adelle by the Fire Crystal. As the adventure continues, Adelle reveals that she is actually a fairy and that Edna is her sister. Edna hates humans and is trying to summon the Night's Nexus to destroy them all. Edna is the one who stole the Asterisks from the realm of the fairies to distribute to Holograd's forces, used them to empower Holograd's forces to seize the crystals through conquest or influence, and let humans drain the crystals' power on frivolous matters rather than their true purpose of suppressing the Nexus.

The four main characters, after having collected all four crystals, battle and defeat Edna. Gloria sacrifices her life to empower the crystals again and seal the Night's Nexus away, continuing the cycle of previous Heroes of Light. While the end credits are displayed, this is a "bad ending", and the player is expected to continue onward. Upon the player deciding to continue, Gloria's sacrifice is shown to be merely a vision of a possible future that the group witnesses within Elvis's mysterious book. While Gloria is fine sacrificing herself to save the world, Seth vows to find another way to destroy the Night's Nexus. Allowing it to awaken in Excillant and attacking it, however, only leads to another "bad ending" as the Night's Nexus continually regenerates itself despite the party's best efforts. After scouring the world for every Asterisk, the four learn that the book contains the memories of the Night's Nexus and that the Night's Nexus was once a human woman who attempted to consume all knowledge and information in the world and went insane. As long as the book remains intact, the Night's Nexus can never be permanently destroyed. The player is able to wipe away the Night's Nexus's "save data" within the book, allowing for her to be truly defeated. The party travels across the ocean separating dimensions to the Nexus's lair, and the four emerge victorious, defeating the Nexus completely.

With the Nexus defeated, its lair begins to collapse, but the heroes are saved by the four crystals, who transport them back to Excillant. Gloria, Elvis, and Adelle are at first alarmed when they can't find Seth, but the Wind Crystal uses its power to revive him, and he is reunited with his friends, with Gloria welcoming him home.

== Development ==
The game was announced for the Nintendo Switch at The Game Awards in December 2019. Upon being asked why the game was titled Bravely Default II despite being the third entry in the series, series producer Tomoyo Asano explained it was because he felt that Bravely Second, the actual second game in the series, had "parts that did not meet the expectations of fans." He originally felt it would be difficult to continue the Bravely series, but the development team's success with the Japan-only mobile title Bravely Default: Fairy's Effect and the 2018 Nintendo Switch title Octopath Traveler inspired them to revisit the series. Producer Masashi Takahashi described the approach as "return[ing] to our roots" while creating a new setting with new characters, leading to the name Bravely Default II. Revo, who composed the soundtrack for Default but not Second, also returned for Default II.

A demo of the game was announced and released on March 26, 2020, following a Nintendo Direct Mini presentation. Square Enix announced that they would be taking fan feedback from the demo and implementing it into the final release. The demo features a story not featured in the final game. The demo was generally praised, though many publications noted that the demo was more difficult than expected.

Bravely Default II was later released on Windows PC on September 2, 2021, via the Steam online platformer. Unlike the Nintendo Switch version, the PC version supports framerates up to 120fps (compared to 30fps on the Switch), resolutions up to 4K, faster loading times, and more detailed graphical settings. It was later verified to have full Steam Deck compatibility including Steam Cloud Save support.

== Reception ==
Reception

Aggregate scores
Aggregator	Score
Metacritic	NS: 76/100; PC: 83/100
OpenCritic	69% recommend

Review scores
Publication	Score
Destructoid	8/10
Game Informer	8/10
GameSpot	6/10
GamesRadar+	5/5
IGN	8/10
Nintendo Life	8/10
Nintendo World Report	8/10
RPGamer	4/5
RPGFan	86/100
Shacknews	8/10
RPGSite	8/10
Vooks	3.5/5

The game received generally positive reviews upon release. IGN's Seth Macy commended the game for continuing the battle and Job systems from the previous titles, its customization and strategy, and its tough but rewarding boss battles. However, he expressed disappointment in the sidequests and dungeon designs. Game Informer's Daniel Tack expressed similar praise for the battle and Job systems and found the experience fulfilling overall, but formulaic to the point of being dull at points. RPGamer's Anna Marie Privitere singled out the lack of a quest log and the imbalance of some Job classes as negatives, but overall concluded that Bravely Default II was her favorite game in the series thus far.

The game's presentation was generally praised by outlets. Macy called the visuals "jaw-droppingly beautiful" while adding that "the upgrade to the Switch has lost a little of their charm from the tiny worlds of the 3DS, and each location is stunning in HD". Watts expressed similar praise, adding "anytime I got access to a new job, I would immediately play dolls with my four heroes, seeing each of their unique looks in the new outfits". Tack called the visuals "all over the place," pointing out the contrast between some that were "quite picturesque and memorable" with strong lighting, and others that were "drab caves, earthy sprawls, and undercityscapes," concluding that the overworlds were merely to serve as a backdrop for enemy encounters. Privitere praised the "lush environments ranging from grasslands to deserts and icy valleys to volcanic mountain heights". However, she commented that the chibi-styled character models, while not unattractive, were not quite so distinct compared to similar smaller-scale titles on the Nintendo Switch.

Several outlets criticized the game's high difficulty level and its difficulty balance. RPG Site's Cullen Black considered that the game's balance "stumbles hard" and stated that "boss difficulty spikes are high, and brutal" and felt “grinding is the order of the day” in the game. GameSpot's Steve Watts called the game "grind-heavy" and lamented the removal of automated battles, thus making grinding more arduous. Shacknews's Josh Hawkins deemed that "the entire game feels like it comes to a halt" when the player is "forced to grind in between major plot points" and said that leveling up to face tougher enemies "can be rough". Game Informer called grinding a major part of the game which can be frustrating. Vooks's Daniel Vuckovic considered that the game had "huge issues with its difficulty curves" with some boss battles that required "huge amounts of grinding to overcome", and called out "large early-game difficulty spikes", "boss fights that can feel exhausting", alongside a difficulty curve they judged "nonsense" even on the lower Casual difficulty level.

=== Sales ===
In August 2021, just prior to the release of the PC version of the game, Square Enix announced that the Switch version of the game had shipped over 950,000 copies worldwide. On December 22, 2021, Square Enix announced that Bravely Default II has sold a million copies.

== Future ==
In 2021, series producer Tomoya Asano stated that the game was well-enough received to work on further entries in the series, but that a sequel was likely 3–4 years out.
