= Tomoya Asano =

Japanese game producer (born 1978)

- 浅野 智也
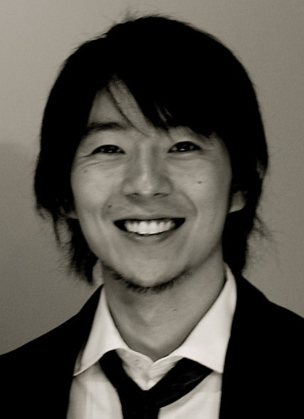
- Asano in 2006
- Born: December 24, 1978 (age 47)
- Education: Keio University
- Occupation: Video game producer
- Years active: 2001–present
- Employer: Square Enix
- Known for: Octopath Traveler; Bravely Default; Triangle Strategy

Tomoya Asano (浅野 智也, born 24 December 1978) is a Japanese game producer working for Square Enix as Studio Head on Creative Studio 5.

After graduating from Keio University Asano first joined Enix in 2001, before gaining a more prominent role within the company after its merger. He started off working on several titles before producing a few titles in the Final Fantasy series. After producing Final Fantasy: The 4 Heroes of Light, Asano and several members on his team went on to create a spiritual successor in Bravely Default.

In 2017 Asano was made head of his own business division in Square Enix, called Business Division 11 and focusing work on the Bravely series and new titles such as Octopath Traveler. The business division was later consolidated in 2019, following a restructure in the divisions of the company, with Business Division 6, 7 and 11 merging to create Creative Business Unit II. However, within Creative Business Unit II Asano and his team are known as Team Asano as they continue working on games similar to their previous creations.

In 2024 Asano was promoted as Studio Head in Creative Studio 5 and as an Executive Officer in the company.

== Works ==
Year	Title	Credit(s)
2001	Minna de Quest: Nijiiro no Yoru	Management producer
2002	Grandia Xtreme	Assistant producer
2002	Robot Alchemic Drive	Producer
2003	Fullmetal Alchemist and the Broken Angel	Producer
2004	Fullmetal Alchemist 2: Curse of the Crimson Elixir	Producer
2005	Fullmetal Alchemist 3: Kami o Tsugu Shōjo	Producer
2006	Final Fantasy III (DS version)	Producer
2006	Dawn of Mana	Coordinator
2007	Final Fantasy IV (DS version)	Producer
2008	Nanashi no Game	Co-producer
2009	Fullmetal Alchemist: Prince of the Dawn	Producer
2009	Nanashi no Game: Me	Co-producer
2009	Final Fantasy: The 4 Heroes of Light	Producer, scenario
2009	Fullmetal Alchemist: Daughter of the Dusk	Co-producer
2011	Ikenie no Yoru	Producer
2012	Bravely Default	Producer, concept
2015	Bravely Second: End Layer	Producer, scenario
2018	Octopath Traveler	Producer, concept
2019	Various Daylife	Producer
2020	Octopath Traveler: Champions of the Continent	Producer, original concept
2021	Bravely Default II	Producer, concept
2022	Triangle Strategy	Producer, concept
2022	Live A Live (Remake)	Producer
2023	Octopath Traveler II	Producer
2024	Dragon Quest III HD-2D Remake	Executive producer
2025	Dragon Quest I & II HD-2D Remake	Chief Producer
2025	Octopath Traveler 0	Producer, concept
2025	Bravely Default: Flying Fairy HD Remaster	Producer, concept
2026	The Adventures of Elliot: The Millennium Tales	Producer, concept
2026	Final Fantasy Resonance	Executive Producer
