= Stride (game engine) =

Video game engine

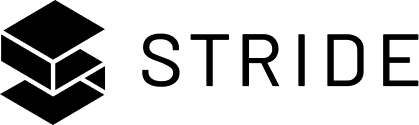
- Logo of Stride
- Stable release: 4.3 / 14 November 2025; 11 months ago
- Written in: C#
- Operating system: Creation: Windows; Deployment: Windows; Linux; Android; iOS; Universal Windows Platform; Xbox One
- Platform: .NET
- Available in: English
- Type: Game engine
- License: MIT License (as of Xenko 3.0); prior to Xenko 3.0: GNU GPLv3 (engine) and proprietary (editor)
- Website: stride3d.net
- Repository: github.com/stride3d/stride

Stride (formerly Xenko and Paradox) is a free and open-source 2D and 3D cross-platform game engine originally developed by Silicon Studio. It can be used to create video games for PC, mobile devices and virtual reality.

Stride, then called Xenko, was originally made available by Silicon Studio under a dual-license model, available to anyone under GNU GPLv3, with alternative, for-pay license terms available for those for whom the GPL's copyleft terms are a barrier to adoption. On August 2, 2018, developer Virgile Bello announced on the Xenko blog that Silicon Studio had dropped support of the project and relicensed Xenko 3.0 under the MIT License. Unlike the prior dual-license arrangement whereby the engine was available as free and open-source software but the editor remained proprietary, under the new arrangement both the engine and the editor are available under the MIT License.

== Functionalities ==
Stride is a C# suite of tools to create games. It is also a full game engine with a customizable shader system intended for virtual reality game development. Its main tool is the Game Studio, a fully integrated environment that allows the user to import assets, create and arrange scenes using an Entity component system, assign scripts, build and run games. The game engine features a Physically-Based Rendering (PBR) layered material editor, photorealistic postprocess effects, and tools such as a particle editor, a scene streaming system, a full tool-chain a sprite editor, a scripting editor and a UI engine. Additionally, it supports a nested prefab and archetype systems scaling along all editors and assets. Stride is also a cross-platform runtime supporting iOS, Android, Windows UWP, Linux. It creates Visual Studio projects, allowing for easy scripting and debugging.

It can be used to create video games for PC and mobile devices, and virtual reality.

Stride is also used as 3D rendering engine for the visual programming environment vvvv gamma.

Features include:

- Open source
- High-end realistic rendering
- Physically based rendering
- Light probes support
- Skin, hair and cloth rendering
- Real-time local reflections
- Photorealistic post effects
- Virtual reality ready
- Customizable rendering pipeline with customizable shader system
- Scalability
- Asynchronous background asset loading

== History ==
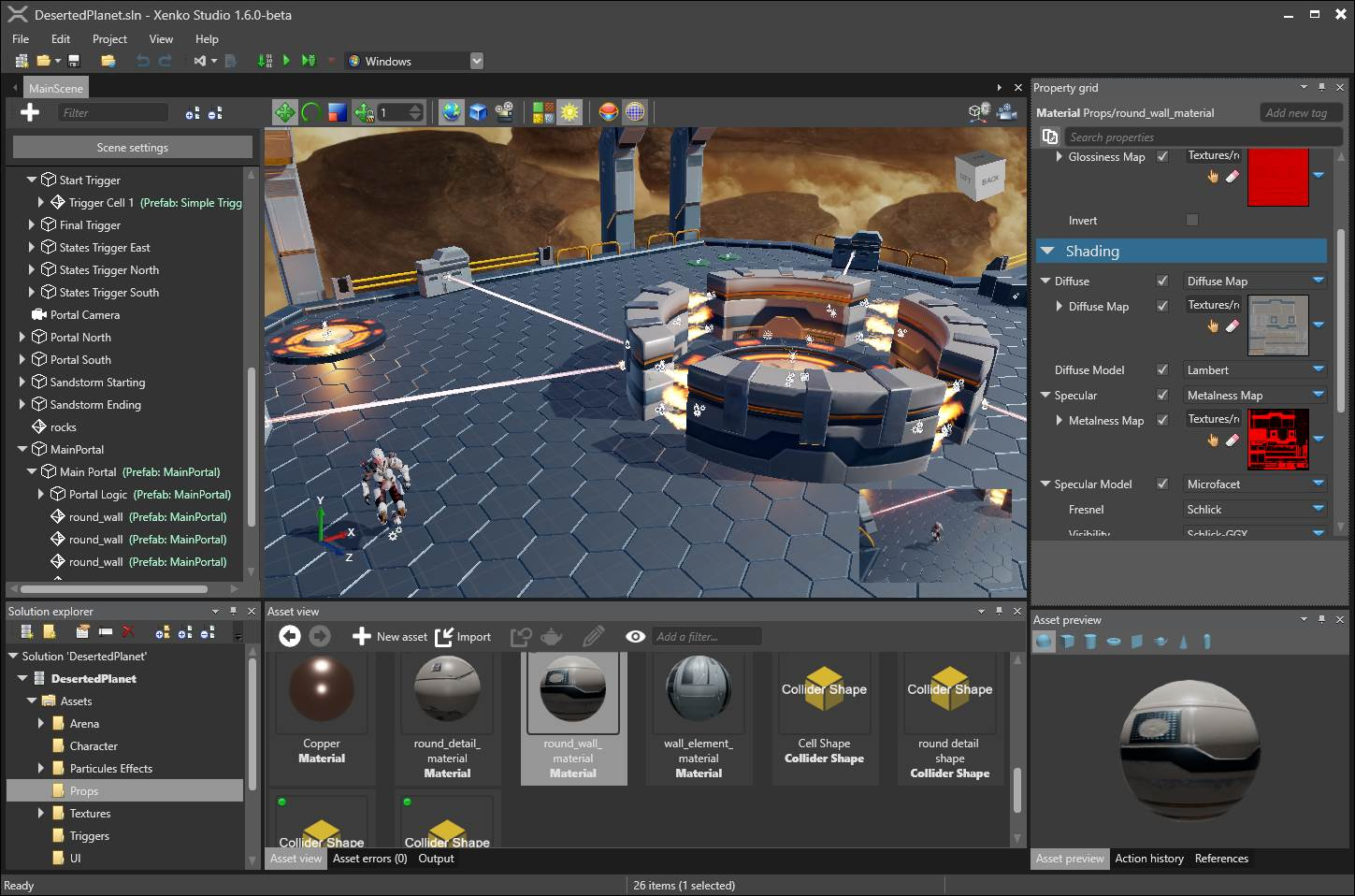
Xenko 1.6 editor

The engine was first named Paradox and was then renamed Xenko. Xenko is taken from the Japanese word zenko which means perfection and light. It was renamed Stride in 2020.

Xenko's first public release, Alpha 1.0, was in September 2014. It went open-source as Xenko on GitHub in October 2014. A scene editor and physically based rendering (PBR) material editor were announced in March 2015 and released in April 2015.

Xenko beta version 1.8x was released out of beta in February 2017.

On March 1, 2017, Microsoft announced that Xenko would be included in their Xbox Creators Program and Major Nelson reported that Xenko would be one of the supported game engines with "out of the box" support for UWP.

In April 2017, Silicon Studio launched Xenko 2.0 under a commercial proprietary license.

In August 2018, Silicon Studio launched Xenko 3.0 and announced the end of their support for the engine, shifting to a community-supported model.

On May 31, 2019, Silicon Studio open sourced their Starbreach Demo code and assets.

On November 11, 2019, Xenko version 3.1 was released.

In April 2020, the engine was renamed to Stride because the developers wanted the engine to join the .NET Foundation, and since the name Xenko was property of Silicon Studio it could not be done.

In February 2021, Stride 4.0 was released.

In July 2022, Stride 4.1 was released.

In February 2024, Stride 4.2 was released.

In November 2025, Stride 4.3 was released.
