= Bravely Default: Fairy's Effect =

2017 role-playing mobile game

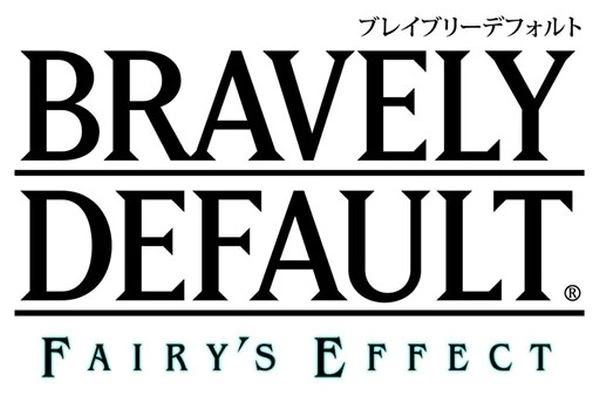
- Developer: Silicon Studio
- Publisher: Square Enix
- Platforms: iOS, Android
- Release: JP: 2017
- Genre: Role-playing video game
- Mode: Single-player

Bravely Default: Fairy's Effect was a mobile game spinoff of the Bravely Default series of video games. It was published by Square Enix in 2017 in Japan, and was discontinued in August 2020.

== Gameplay ==
While the mainline Bravely Default games play as traditional JRPG's, Bravely Default: Fairy's Effect plays as a mobile game-styled simplification of the genre. The game is free to play with gacha luck-based mechanics to recruit characters and other items. It features a simplified, streamlined version of the game's series take on a turn based battle system.

== Development ==
The game was first teased by Square Enix in October 2016, where the company teased that they would be doing something to celebrate the four year anniversary of the release of the first Bravely Default game's 2012 Japanese release. The game was officially announced the following month, as Bravely Default: Fairy's Effect - a mobile phone game role-playing video game to be developed by Silicon Studio and published by Square Enix. The game would be the second mobile-spinoff for the series, after the Japan-only Bravely Default: D's Report. Claytechworks was later reported to have worked on the title as well. It was also announced that it would be receiving a closed beta test prior to its official release in Japan as well, which was scheduled for sometime in 2017. In the coming days, the first screenshots would be released as well, showing that the game would contain graphics similar to the two main entries on the Nintendo 3DS, albeit without the stereoscopic 3D effects. However, the game was later revealed to not be a traditional JRPG as the 3DS entries, but a stream-lined and simplified mobile-styled variant. The game launched in Japan March 2017, and ran successfully for three and a half years, until its shutdown on August 31, 2020. Square Enix cited it being difficult for them to provide sufficient service to satisfy customers as their reasons for the game's end. The game never received a release outside of Japan.

== Reception and impact ==
While the game was never released outside of Japan, the game still elicited commentary from Western publications. Some publications acknowledged that fans may lament the series' move to mobile phones after not being happy with some of Square Enix's other franchises poorly-received transitions to the platform, while others were more hopeful due to the fact that the main development team would be working on the spinoff, and that its success could help fund future mainline entries to the series. The latter sentiments ended up being the truth. Fairy's Effect quick and immediate financial success in Japan led to the development of another mainline entry, 2021's Bravely Default II. In 2020, upon being asked why the game was titled Bravely Default II despite being the third entry in the series, series producer Asano explained it was because he felt that Bravely Second, the actual second game in the series, had "parts that did not meet the expectations of fans." He initially felt it would be difficult to continue the Bravely series in the future, but the development team's success with Fairy's Effect and the Nintendo Switch title Octopath Traveler inspired them to revisit the series and led to planning of another entry.
