= Ikenie no Yoru =

2011 video game

- Developers: Square Enix; Marvelous Entertainment
- Publisher: Marvelous Entertainment
- Directors: Shota Shimoda; Takashi Tokita
- Producer: Tomoya Asano
- Composers: Masayoshi Soken; Ai Yamashita
- Platform: Wii
- Release: JP: March 24, 2011
- Genres: Horror, adventure
- Mode: Single-player

Ikenie no Yoru (イケニエノヨル, lit. "Night of Sacrifice"), is a 2011 survival horror adventure game developed and published by Marvelous Entertainment for the Wii. In the game, the player controls in turn five teenagers exploring a haunted mansion. The player has no weapons against the ghosts, and instead must run away to avoid being touched and killed. The game uses the Wii Remote as well as the Wii Balance Board for different elements in the game. Ikenie no Yoru was released only in Japan on March 24th 2011.

Upon release, the game received little press attention in the west; the review from Nintendo Gamer was mixed while the review from Nintendo World Report was very positive. Particular praise was noted for the game's use of the balance board, but the game was criticized for being generic and too simple.

== Gameplay ==
In the game there are few mechanics. The player walks forward with one button, and backwards with another. Tapping the buttons allows the player to briefly run. The Wii Remote is used as a flashlight and to make calls/pick up calls from your "cell phone", and the Wii Balance Board is used for certain elements in the game, such as movement. The player is killed if they are touched by a ghost, and have no way of fighting back- instead, the player attempts to avoid being touched. Ghost roam around in close or sparse patterns, and sometimes chase the player in short sequences. The player must carefully time their movements to sneak past the ghosts. The game consists of twenty-three ten-minute segments.

After completing the game once, a more difficult mode is unlocked titled "Curse" mode, with challenges to make the game harder. A bonus chapter is unlocked after completing the hard mode.

== Plot ==
A group of college students have decided to take a trip to a place called the Tsukuyomi Ravine, where people used to sacrifice to the gods. There are five main characters in this game, which the game encourages the player to rename with the names of their friends: Black, Blue, Yellow, Pink and Red.

Black invites the group to the ravine, and his father owns the mansion in which they then stay. Red, the hot-tempered leader of the group, incites the group to come and "test [their] courage" with him. Blue is shown to be kind, and to have a strong sense of justice. Yellow, while also kind, is more courteous and proper; she is further presented as pure of heart, and from a decidedly good upbringing. Yellow comes to befriend a mysterious young girl during her trip. Pink is rather vocal about her beliefs and opinions, much to the others' chagrin. The epilogue contains an additional character called "You." The player controls each of these six characters in turn, as they explore the mansion.

== Development ==
Marvelous Entertainment announced the game in late 2010, slated for a release on March 24, 2011. It was also announced that a limited-time purchase would be included, namely an amulet that was based on the game.

While Square Enix was not officially affiliated with development of the game, some members from the company such as Takashi Tokita and Tomoya Asano were brought in to help with development.

== Reception ==
Nintendo Gamer magazine, in a review of an imported version of the game, felt that the game offered some truly terrifying moments but little else. They felt that the amount of repetition involved in all five characters exploring the game combined with the lack of gameplay mechanics besides running past and from ghosts left the game boring between the moments of terror. They concluded that the game was a "noble" and "scary failure" but they favorably compared it to Ju-On: The Grudge and Calling. The final rating was 6.8/10.

Conversely, Andrew Brown of Nintendo World Report applauded the game's use of the Wii Remote and Wii Balance Board, and believed the new control scheme made the game scarier. Although he noted the graphics and clichés as minor criticisms, Brown recommended Ikenie no Yoru to fans of the genre and called it the "Best Obscure Game of 2011."

=== Sales ===
According to Famitsu Magazine, the game sold 5,359 units as of 2012.
