= Rise of Incarnates =

2015 video game

- Developer: Bandai Namco Entertainment
- Publisher: Bandai Namco Entertainment
- Director: Ryuichi Arita
- Producer: Daisuke Murano
- Designer: Takechika Miyamoto
- Programmer: Katsuhiro Ishii
- Artist: Tomoyuki Tsuru
- Composer: Hiroyuki Fujita
- Engine: Orochi 3
- Platform: Microsoft Windows
- Release: WW: July 1, 2015
- Genre: Fighting
- Mode: Multiplayer

Rise of Incarnates was a multiplayer free-to-play fighting video game developed and published by Bandai Namco Entertainment. Announced early 2014 and presented at the 2014 Electronic Entertainment Expo, the game featured two-on-two gameplay. The game was developed by the same staff that worked on the Soulcalibur, Tekken, and Mobile Suit Gundam: Extreme Vs. series, three major fighting game franchises of Bandai Namco.

It was released in July 2015. However, the game lasted until October 2015 with online servers completely closed by December 2015.

== Gameplay ==
Gameplay screenshot of Rise of Incarnates.

The game's playable characters were the so-called Incarnates, humans who have awoken mythical powers. Players could apply long-range assault with close-quarter combat. Their powers allowed them to transform into a creature or summon a being to assist them in battle. Power ups can be used for the characters such as additional defense/speed.

Battle arenas were set in the following locations:

- New York City
- San Francisco
- London
- Paris
- Washington, D.C.

== Synopsis ==
=== Setting ===
Rise of Incarnates is set in a post-apocalyptic Earth. A string of "cube phenomena", which saw objects and spaces appearing as perfect cubes, attract multiple catastrophic events, including meteorites falling from the sky and massive cold fronts sweeping across the land which brought about the collapse of cities around the world, leading the people in the planet to live in a state of perpetual fear. Among the people are those known as "incarnates"—humans who can draw powers from daimones; spirit manifestations of the gods, demons, and monsters from all of the world's mythologies. General public fear incarnates for their supernatural powers, not helped by the fact that the cube phenomenon is sighted every time the incarnates use their powers, while the authorities attempt to harness their powers for their own deeds.

For this reason, several different factions have been formed in reaction to the rise of the incarnates. The U.S. government has formed the "Phantom Unit", an experimental incarnate deployment program that seeks to become the incubator for incarnates and place them in various agencies based on their aptitude, as well as the "Wild Hunt", a covert organization in several squadrons answering directly to the President of the United States, created with the goal of apprehending and exterminating unregistered incarnates. Across the pond, the British government has also formed the "Were-Legion" with the same purpose as the Phantom Unit but is composed of incarnates that take the form of shapeshifters. In the wake of the hostility and persecution that occur between the incarnates and the powerless, two competing organizations were formed: Akohr, an elite organization that considers the incarnates as abominations to the human race and seeks to annihilate them with the "Slayer"; and Vikarāla, an India-based industry corporation that had stepped in as the main facilitator of communication between individuals free of cost with a hidden agenda: ensuring that the incarnates rule the world.

A battle of dominance between each incarnates is triggered when one day, an enigmatic voice speaks in the mind of every incarnates, requiring them to defeat the "sovereign of this era" to avoid a certain destruction.

=== Plot ===
While driving with his girlfriend, Emily, incarnate Jedrek Tyler has to watch her getting captured by a convoy of Wild Hunt, a U.S. government paramilitary organization. Resolving to find her, he teams up with Terrence Blake, a Wild Hunt renegade. The two receive help from arms dealer Mireia Valentin, who informs them about "the Prophet", a classified profile in the U.S. government; the U.S. government in turn is trying to locate "the Herald", a being connected to the Prophet. The three later learn that Emily, despite not being an incarnate, has the ability to channel the incarnates' lamia energy.

The case about the Prophet, a being contained in the body of a man named Oswald Coleman, attracts numerous people to try to delve into its identity and potentially seek its power, including Reinhold Kruger, a British commander of the "Were-Legion" interested in using the figure to bring about a world revolution. Concerned, U.S. President Sanders tasks Erendira Queen, the leader of the Wild Hunt, to protect the Prophet at all costs. At the same time, there also exists Kanat, a mysterious incarnate who has the ability to turn people he heal into incarnates. Kanat is protected by Ricardo Abascal from the attack of Akohr, an experimental organization intending to eradicate incarnates once and for all.

Eventually, the Prophet summons a demonic being, Red Dragon, who is actually Jedrek from a parallel universe. The Red Dragon is controlled by the Herald, revealed to be none other than Emily, an artificial human created by the Prophet to turn humans and incarnates against each other; the real Emily, President Sanders' daughter, had died a long time ago. Sanders kills her to stop the Red Dragon's rampage, though this only earns him Jedrek's hatred. Seeing Sanders overwhelming Jedrek in a duel, Mireia kills the former. The remaining incarnates attempt stop the Prophet from escaping, to no avail. The Prophet then reveals that he has been using Sanders, "the Sovereign", all along, his goal being to reign over a new world.

== Characters ==
=== Playable ===
- Jedrek Tyler
  A young man who has recently awakened his incarnate after a street fight that left him severely injured, whose Mephistopheles often enters Jedrek's mind and urges him to succumb to his thirst for violence and devastation. He becomes involved in the battle among the factions when his girlfriend, Emily, is kidnapped by the Wild Hunt under the U.S. government, who plans to use her for an unknown purpose.

His daimon is Mephistopheles.

- Terrence Blake
  A runaway member of the Wild Hunt who severed his ties with the U.S. government after they decided to uphold a law that severely limited the rights of the incarnates. He is very pro-incarnate, contrasting him with his former comrade, Erendira Quinn, with whom he is implied to have a special relationship. Blake awoke his incarnate powers after watching his parents die in a pirate raid. He has the power of "Deuteros" (the ability to summon a god to aid him).

His daimon is Ares.

- Mireia Valentin
  A sarcastic arms dealer eager to venture on the highest classified profile in the U.S. government known as "the Prophet". She is well-acquainted with her partner-in-crime, Edgar Burns, as well as Ishin Asakura and his late friend, Himuro, whose daughter, Yuki, she later takes custody of. Her incarnate transforms her into a multi-winged creature.

Her daimon is Lilith.

- Gaspard Watteau
  A specialist in incarnate research-turned-criminal wanting to exact revenge against the U.S. government for having abandoned his project. He plans to convert incarnates into zombies, deeming them as the perfect subjects under his control. Watteau's incarnate allows him to summon zombies at his disposal.

His daimon is the Grim Reaper.

- Erendira Quinn
  Commander of the First Squadron of the Wild Hunt organization with has an abusive childhood. Her only loyalty is to President Sanders, even when his plans are in question. She is also close to Terrence Blake before his departure and even then, she still maintains contacts with him to further her objectives in the organization.

Her daimon is Brynhildr.

- Reinhold Kruger
  Commander of the Were-Legion who wants to overture the European power structure and heighten the incarnates' dominance. He has his attention on "the Prophet", which is currently held by the U.S. government under President Sanders.

His daimon is Odin.

- Ricardo Abascal
  Former doctor who used to hate incarnates after his family was killed by one of them, but after saving Kanat, a healer boy, and becoming incarnate through the child's power, he cast that hatred aside and promised to help anyone along the way, considering both sides as equal from now on.

His daimon is Ra.

- Brad Burrell
  A member of the Were-Legion forces who used to think he had no important mission until Colonel Kruger took charge. From then on, Burrell owes his loyalty to him.

His daimon is Fenrir.

- Fernando "Slayer" Duran
  A follower of Akohr who was subjected to an experiment in which his human body was modified with an armor and a lamina weapon, giving him the ability to control his own lamina energy. In his new form, he gained a reputation for his record on killing incarnates. Duran has also a shared past with his former Akohr partner, Ricardo Abascal.

Duran does not have a daimon, but is able to fight on equal grounds with other incarnates by his robotic equipment that controls lamina energy.

- Zaur Miljkovich
  An ex-employee of Akohr who went on the run after awaking his incarnate, until he was found by the Vikarāla corporation.

His daimon is Loki.

- Asha Mehta
  The ruthless CEO of Vikarāla Corporation who is known because of her work in the post-disaster global reconstruction effort. She possesses a vision of the future in which incarnates reign over the powerless masses. Her followers call her Rani ("lady").

Her daimon is Kali.

- Gordon Matthew Sanders
  The President of the United States who ascended to the presidency placing an incarnate at the pinnacle of American power. He is the true leader of the Wild Hunt faction, and has a prisoner called "The Prophet" in custody but he needs to capture "The Herald" in order to achieve his final goal. According to the Prophet, Sanders is the one who becomes the "Sovereign."

His daimon is Zeus.

- Yuki Himuro
  A 17-year old Japanese schoolgirl from Hokkaido whose father was killed by the Vikarāla. She is herself targeted by the Vikarāla and is currently on travel with Mireia and Edgar so she can train her incarnate powers.

Her daimon is Utsuta Hime.

- "Red Dragon"
  Once a human who rose against the Sovereign after the first annihilation of humankind under the orders of the Prophet, he was put into a stasis and given lamina and herald tissue, which transformed him into the being he is today. He is actually Jedrek from an alternate timeline who is brought to the current timeline by the Prophet to turn incarnates against humans through the control of the Herald. He is killed by President Sanders.

The Prophet used to be his daimon.

=== Non-playable ===
- Emily
  Jedrek Tyler's girlfriend who has no fear against him for being an incarnate. After they crashed within gang-controlled territory, Jedrek unleashed Mephistopheles for the first time. She is pursued by the Wild Hunt thereafter, referring her as the "Herald". It is later revealed that the real Emily was President Sanders' daughter who had died a while back; the current Emily, the Herald, is controlled by the Prophet to turn the incarnates against humans. She is the one who controls Red Dragon after his awakening, but both are subsequently killed by Sanders, angering Jedrek.
  Edgar Burns
  Mireia Valentin's partner-in-crime who provides her with weapons and arms. He is well aware of the incarnate world and has connections with many incarnates, including Ishin and Himuro. He fights with a gun.
  Kanat
  A healer boy who is one of Akohr's targets, and he is being safely kept by Ricardo Abascal. He possesses a phoenix that allows him to heal people, turning them into incarnates.
  Dr. Sakaki
  An employee of Akohr who has been in charge of the "Slayer" program, the one that turned Fernando Duran into a cyborg.
  Ishin Asakura
  A Japanese incarnate and an old friend of Yuki Himuro's father. He became a father-figure to Yuki and trained her to control her incarnate powers before passing her over to Mireia so he can concentrate on his own plans.
  Oswald Coleman
  A prisoner who shares his mind with the daimon known as "The Prophet" who is the reason why they are both captive by Gordon Sanders.
  The Prophet
  A daimon from a future timeline who is responsible for bringing each incarnate his/her own Lamina weapon in order to defeat the Sovereign. He was able to bond with a human nicknamed the "Red Dragon," the direct descendant of Jedrek Tyler. At the end of issue #17 it was revealed that he is the real mastermind of all the events in the game, as he initially wanted to kill Gordon Sanders to fulfill his own agenda.

== Comics ==
The game's official website released an online graphic novel that features some of the game's events. In collaboration with Marvel Comics, Bandai Namco adapted the web comic into a 17-issue comic book.

The new comic series made its debut on July 23, 2014, at San Diego Comic-Con, with the first two issues in a combined volume. Marvel Custom Solutions vice president Jonathan Rheingold said "Bandai Namco Games and Marvel working together was a no-brainer. Both companies hold to the highest standards of quality storytelling, artistic talent recruitment and character creation, so it was a natural connection for Marvel to offer its expertise to the legendary video game developer in packaging and distributing the comic book adaptation of Rise of Incarnates."

The newly released volume was also available at approximately 2,500 comic speciality shops supporting Marvel Comics for free from July 24, 2014. Additionally, the comics were accessible for free digitally through the Marvel Unlimited Comics App on iOS and Android devices.

List of volumes
Number	Title	Release date	Reference(s)
1	"Ambush in the Square"	N/A	
2	"Emily is Taken"	June 16, 2014	
3	"The Origin of Ares"	N/A	
4	"Chasing the Herald"	N/A	
5	"Erendira vs. Terrence"	September 26, 2014	
6	"A Common Enemy"	December 10, 2014	
7	"The Incarnate Slayer"	December 19, 2014	
8	"Capture the Phoenix"	February 6, 2015	
9	"Leaving Yuki"	March 27, 2015	
10	"The Vikarāla Offensive"	May 22, 2015	
11	"The Akhor Massacre"	June 21, 2015	
12	"The Red Dragon Awakens"	July 24, 2015	
13	"The Red Dragon vs. the Sovereign"	August 9, 2015	
14	"Dr. Watteau Strikes Back"	October 2, 2015	
15	"Seize the Prophet"	November 2, 2015	
16	"Sanders's Last Stand"	December 4, 2015	
17	"The Prophet Returns"	December 18, 2015	

== Development ==
On April 22, 2014, Bandai Namco announced the game being developed during Global Gamer’s Day with Ryuichiro Baba serving as executive producer with Daisuke Murano and Michael Murray as producers. The game was publicly shown in France at the 2014 Japan Expo (Note: The even took place from July 2 to July 6, 2014.) in May 2014. Rise of Incarnates's engine is based on Mobile Suit Gundam: Extreme Vs.

On May 29, 2014, Rise of the Incarnates was in alpha, which ran from May 30 to June 1. The game was shown at the 2014 Electronic Entertainment Expo. (Note: The event took place from June 10 to 12.) In a July 2014 interview, Murano said that the game is inspired by American comics/cities.

On July 25, 2014, the game had a beta which ran on August 8 when it was announced at San Diego Comic-Con with another announcement with a collaboration with MadCatz to create an arcade controller for the game.

In an interview with Baba in September 2014, Bandai Namco chose to develop/publish the game instead of publishing the Mobile Suit Gundam: Gundam vs. Gundam games overseas is because the IP is familiar to players from Asia, which leads to much greater reception and potential licensing publishing issues to have the games sold outside the region. This led to the decision to create Rise of Incarnates as 2-on-2 gameplay is popular with gamers from Western countries. Baba said that he hoped a fanbase would develop in order to increase the likelihood of having the Gundam vs. Gundam games marketed/sold overseas.

The game was pulled from Steam in October 2015, and its servers were shut down in December 2015. The shutdown was likely due to low number of players playing the game.

== Reception ==
Reception

Aggregate score
Aggregator	Score
Metacritic	67/100

Review scores
Publication	Score
Edge	60
GamesTM	70
IGN	80

It has a score of 68% on Metacritic. IGN awarded it a score of 8.0 out of 10, saying "Rise of Incarnates' great fighting action depends heavily on teamwork - when you bring a friend, it shines." GamesTM said the combat was well structured with a score of 70%.

=== Awards ===
List of awards and nominations
Award	Category	Result	Ref.
The Game Awards 2015	Best Fighting Game	Nominated	
