= 3D Dot Game Heroes =

2009 video game

- North American box art
- Developer: Silicon Studio
- Publishers: JP: FromSoftware; NA: Atlus USA; EU: SouthPeak Games
- Director: Koichi Watanabe
- Producers: Koshi Tsuboi; Masanori Takeuchi
- Composers: Shinji Hosoe; Yousuke Yasui; Ayako Saso; Shoichiro Sakamoto; Teruo Taniguchi; Takahiro Eguchi; Norihiro Hurukawa
- Platform: PlayStation 3
- Release: JP: November 5, 2009; NA: May 11, 2010; EU: May 14, 2010
- Genre: Action role-playing
- Mode: Single-player

3D Dot Game Heroes (Note: Japanese: 3Dドットゲームヒーローズ, Hepburn: Surī Dī Dotto Gēmu Hīrōzu) is an action role-playing video game developed by Silicon Studio and published by FromSoftware for the PlayStation 3. The game is presented using voxel-based graphics in a 3D environment to emulate the 2D graphics of earlier video games. The game was released in Japan in November 2009, and respectively in North America and Europe by Atlus USA and SouthPeak Games in May 2010.

Upon release, 3D Dot Game Heroes garnered positive reviews from critics, praising the nostalgic gameplay and graphics.

== Gameplay ==
In-game screenshot of 3D Dot Game Heroes

The gameplay resembles that of action role-playing games on third generation video game consoles from the 1980s, particularly that of The Legend of Zelda and Final Fantasy Adventure, and also aesthetically similar to Dragon Quest. Players move characters from screen to screen exploring dungeons, battling enemies, collecting items and solving puzzles. When the player's health bar is full, the player's sword will grow to tremendous sizes whenever swung. Swords in-game can be customized and leveled up to increase their length, width, as well as magical power, and other special items that can also be used include boomerangs, lanterns, candles, and bows.

Players can create their own character model using the game's 3D sprite editor. Players can collect monsters to be featured in an encyclopedia which is done through beating the monster on its head with a book until its profile shows up in the encyclopedia's pages. Loading screens in-game feature recreated box art of classic video games using the game's 3D sprites.

== Synopsis ==
The game follows a hero on a quest to rid the Dotnia Kingdom of a dark plague caused by the forces of evil in order to restore peace to the land. Legend tells of an evil king known as the Dark King Onyx who brought tragedy and darkness to the kingdom by stealing six magical orbs. However, a hero rose up against the Dark King and with his legendary sword as well as the power of the orbs, he sealed Onyx away within another orb. However, the forces of evil rose again as the Dark Bishop Fuelle stole the orb and threw the Kingdom of Dotnia into a state of chaos once more. The game's main protagonist is the grandchild of the brave hero who sealed away the Dark King and thus is entrusted with the responsibility to save the land.

The kingdom was once a 2D pixelated world but as the King of the Land felt that sprites were outdated he thus decreed for the kingdom to make the switch to 3D. This caused the entire world to become 3D while still retaining its original pixelated look.

== Development ==
Silicon Studio developed 3D Dot Game Heroes in just 10 months despite none of the development team having prior experience with PS3 development. The game was actually created as a way to showcase Silicon Studio's middleware technology, and the speed at which development could progress with it. The game was teased by FromSoftware on August 10, 2009, with a teaser site showing a cube and a countdown-timer to August 20, 2009. The game was unveiled before the countdown ended by Japanese gaming magazine Famitsu, on August 18, 2009. A North American release of the game was confirmed by the Twitter account of Sony Computer Entertainment which said that the game was "definitely" coming to North America. On November 17, 2009, Atlus confirmed that they would be localizing and publishing the game in North America for a May 11, 2010 release.

== Reception ==
Reception

Aggregate score
Aggregator	Score
Metacritic	77/100

Review scores
Publication	Score
1Up.com	B−
Famitsu	30/40
GameSpot	7.5/10
IGN	8.5/10

The game received a generally positive reception from critics with a Metacritic score of 77/100. Famitsu gave the game an 8/8/7/7, a total of 30 out of 40, saying that the gameplay is a huge homage to The Legend of Zelda and there are numerous references to Nintendo Entertainment System games throughout the game, making it a "nostalgia-laden trip." Famitsu also praised the graphics saying that the blocky animations are pretty and that they fuse the old with the new seamlessly, also saying that it was a fun and well-made title, though it does not qualify as a new and original game. Samuel Claiborn of IGN gave the game an 8.5 stating: "Other Zelda imitators seem to lose sight of the playfulness and irreverence that Miyamoto and others infused classic games with, but 3D Dot Game Heroes never pretends that it's anything but a game, and games like 3D Dot Game Heroes should be played." Jeremy Parish of 1Up.com gave the game a B− and thought the game was decent saying: "The parodic loading screens, throwaway in-jokes, and ridiculous visuals are an amusing novelty, but once that's worn away, you still have a pretty decent adventure to keep you going through to the end." Tom McShea of GameSpot gave the game 7.5 out of 10 praised its old school roots stating: "3D Dot Game Heroes is a pleasant retreat for anyone who pines for the good old days, but even those without nostalgic links to the past will find an enjoyable experience."

According to Famitsu magazine, 3D Dot Game Heroes sold 17,300 units in Japan by the end of 2009, making it the 463rd best-selling game of the year in that region. Atlus USA reported in October 2010 that 3D Dot Game Heroes sold 160,000 units, greater than six times the amount they had anticipated.
