= Silicon Studio =

Japanese technology company and video game developer

Silicon Studio Corporation
- Native name: シリコンスタジオ株式会社
- Romanized name: Shirikonsutajio Kabushiki-gaisha
- Type: Public (K.K.)
- Traded as: TYO: 3907
- Industry: Computer graphics Video games
- Founded: 2000
- Headquarters: Tokyo, Japan
- Key people: Teruyasu Sekimoto (Honorary Chairman); Shinichiro Kajitani (President and CEO)
- Products: Enlighten (radiosity engine); YEBIS; 3D Dot Game Heroes; Bravely Default; Bravely Second: End Layer
- Number of employees: 192 (as of November 2023)
- Website: siliconstudio.co.jp English

Silicon Studio Corporation is a Japanese computer graphics technology company and HR services provider based in Tokyo. As a technology development company, Silicon Studio has produced several products in the 3D computer graphics field, including middleware software, such as a post-processing visual effects library YEBIS, real-time global illumination technology, such as Enlighten, and Mizuchi, a physically based rendering engine. As a video game developer, Silicon Studio has worked on many different titles for several gaming platforms, most notably, the action-adventure game 3D Dot Game Heroes on the PlayStation 3, the role-playing video games Bravely Default and Bravely Second: End Layer on the Nintendo 3DS, and Fantasica on the iOS and Android mobile platforms.

== History ==
Silicon Studio was established in 2000. It was founded by Teruyasu Sekimoto, who was formerly the senior vice president of Silicon Graphics (SGI). Specializing from the start in rendering technology, research and development methods, post-processing visual effects, game content development, and online game solutions, Silicon Studio created four main studios to achieve the highest productivity in these areas. The research team at Silicon Studio developed several techniques related to fields in visual effects shown at the Computer Entertainment Developers Conference, such as post effect processing and global illumination. While traditionally a provider of middleware solutions for Japanese game developers, Silicon Studio has grown as an international company with a greater focus on the visibility of their products abroad.

Silicon Studio has partnerships with a number of companies, including Allegorithmic from France, Audiokinetic from Canada, Stainless Games from the UK, Kunos Simulazioni and Milestone from Italy, Microsoft and Pixar from the US, Papergames from China, and a number of Japanese companies including Nintendo, Bandai Namco, DeNA, Dimps, FromSoftware, Idea Factory, Koei Tecmo, Marvelous, Sega, and Sony Computer Entertainment. Silicon Studio has also partnered with the following companies: Vivante, OTOY, Square Enix, and Matchlock.

In February 2015, Silicon Studio was listed on the Tokyo Stock Exchange Mothers market.

== Video games ==
Games developed by Silicon Studio:

Release date	Titles	Genre	Publisher(s)	Platform(s)
2007	Operation Darkness (Special Thanks)	Tactical role-playing	JP: Success; NA: Atlus	Xbox 360
2009	Onore no Shinzuru Michi Wo Yuke	Action	JP: FromSoftware	PlayStation Portable
2009	3D Dot Game Heroes	Action-adventure	JP: FromSoftware; NA: Atlus; EU: SouthPeak Games	PlayStation 3
2010	Three Kingdoms Card Battle	Social role-playing	Silicon Studio	Mobage
2012	Bravely Default	Role-playing	JP: Square Enix; NA/PAL: Nintendo	Nintendo 3DS
2012	Fantasica	Tactical role-playing	Silicon Studio	Mobage
2012	Muramasa: Princess Commander	Social card game	Silicon Studio	Mobage
2014	Monster Takt	Role-playing	Silicon Studio	Android, iOS
2014	Age of Ishtaria	Action role-playing	Silicon Studio	Android, iOS
2015	Grand Sphere	Role-playing	Silicon Studio	Android, iOS
2015	Muramasa: Princess Commander -Miyabi-	Role-playing card game	Silicon Studio	Android, iOS
2015	Bravely Second: End Layer	Role-playing	JP: Square Enix; NA/PAL: Nintendo	Nintendo 3DS
2017	Terra Battle 2	Role-playing	JP: Mistwalker; NA: Mistwalker	Android, iOS, PC

== Middleware ==
=== Enlighten ===
Enlighten is middleware that processes global illumination in real time. In August 2017, Silicon Studio obtained the rights to the real-time global illumination product "Enlighten" from Geomerics. It supports 3D lightmaps and real-time ray tracing to improve the simulation of light in complex environments. This technology enables performance optimization and workflow simplification across multiple platforms, from consoles to mobile devices. Enlighten is integrated into Unreal Engine and supports physically based lighting, dynamic weather, and time-of-day effects.

Titles that have used Enlighten include:

- NieR:Automata (2017)
- Rime (2017)
- Dragon Quest XI:Echoes of an Elusive Age (2017)
- Hellblade: Senua's Sacrifice (2017)
- Modern Combat Versus (2017)
- Street Fighter V Arcade Edition (2018)
- Pro Evolution Soccer 2019 (2018)
- God Eater 3 (2018)
- State of Decay 2 (2018)
- eFootball PES (2019)
- PHANTASY STAR ONLINE 2 NEW GENESIS (2020)
- eFootball 2022 (2021)
- NieR Replicant ver.1.22474487139... (2021)
- Infinity Nikki (2024)

As of September 2024, Enlighten supports 7 platforms. These platforms include: Windows, Xbox Series X|S, PlayStation 5, PlayStation 4, Nintendo Switch, iOS and Android.

In September 2025, Silicon Studio released Enlighten version 4.03 P2 for Unreal Engine, which added support for the Nintendo Switch 2 platform.

Bishamon – Bishamon is a particle effect authoring tool and runtime library that works for many gaming platforms. It is developed by a partner company and is integrated with the Orochi3 game development engine.

Motion Portrait – Motion Portrait is a technology tool that can automatically animate a portrait. It supports both regular camera photos or non-realistic character drawings.

=== YEBIS ===
Development for YEBIS originally began some time around 2004. Notable video games that utilize YEBIS include:

- 3D Dot Game Heroes (2009)
- Dynasty Warriors 7 (2011)
- Gunslinger Stratos (2012)
- rFactor 2 (2012)
- Fighter Within (2013)
- Monster Monpiece (2013)
- The Witch and the Hundred Knight (2013)
- Saint Seiya: Brave Soldiers (2013)
- Valhalla Knights 3 (2013)
- MotoGP 14 (2014)
- MXGP The Official Motocross Videogame (2014)
- Assetto Corsa (2014)
- Bloodborne (2015)
- Dragon Ball XenoVerse (2015)
- Final Fantasy XV (2016)
- Dragon Ball XenoVerse 2 (2017)
- Final Fantasy XII: The Zodiac Age (2017)
- Zone of the Enders: The 2nd Runner MARS (2018)
- Black Desert Online (2016)
- Pokémon: Let's Go, Pikachu! and Let's Go, Eevee! (2018)
- Le Mans Ultimate (2024)

Software that support YEBIS include:

- Substance Designer 4.3
- Substance Painter
- Luminous Engine
- Modo
- OTOY real-time path tracing engine

As of October 2024, YEBIS supports 11 platforms. These platforms include: Windows, Linux, macOS, Xbox Series X|S, Xbox One, PlayStation 5, PlayStation 4, PlayStation VR, Nintendo Switch, iOS and Android.

YEBIS 2

YEBIS 2 is a post-processing middleware solution that allows developers to create high-quality lens-simulation optical effects.

In June 2013, Silicon Studio announced that their next post-processing middleware solution, YEBIS 2, would be available for game developers on the PlayStation 4 and Xbox One development network. At the E3 Expo 2013, Square Enix's tech demo Agni's Philosophy was shown using YEBIS 2 post-processing effects.

In August 2013, the YEBIS 2 tech demo "Rigid Gems" was featured in Google’s official unveiling of the Nexus 7 mobile tablet. YEBIS has also been used for the Xbox One launch title, Fighter Within. In May 2014, Silicon Studio announced that their YEBIS 2 middleware was being utilized in the MotoGP 14 video racing game, developed by Milestone for PlayStation 4. YEBIS 2 is also utilized by Square Enix's Luminous Studio engine, and the action role-playing game Final Fantasy XV which runs on the Luminous Studio engine. In 2014, Allegorithmic announced that it had integrated YEBIS 2 with software such as Substance Designer 4.3 and Substance Painter, which are supported by The Foundry's Modo software. OTOY has also been using YEBIS for their real-time path tracing engine on PC.

In 2015, Geomerics announced that it has integrated YEBIS 3 with the Forge lighting tool for the Enlighten 3 software.

YEBIS 4

In July 2025, Silicon Studio released YEBIS 4, an all-new version of its post-effect middleware, introducing support for real-time lens effects (such as depth of field, lens flare and chromatic aberration) optimized for modern GPU architectures and supporting platforms including Nintendo Switch 2, PlayStation 5, Xbox Series X|S and Windows.

=== Engines ===
OROCHI3 – Orochi3 is an all-in-one game development engine. It supports PlayStation 4, Xbox One, PlayStation 3, PlayStation Vita, Xbox 360 and PC. It was used by Bandai Namco Entertainment's fighting game Rise of Incarnates. An earlier version of Orochi was also used by Square Enix's third-person shooter arcade game Gunslinger Stratos in 2012.

Mizuchi

A new real-time graphics engine that debuted in 2014, compatible with the PC and PlayStation 4 platforms. It is called Mizuchi, with the full title, Mizuchi: The Cutting-Edge Real-Time Rendering Engine. It is intended to be used for various different applications, including video game development, films, architectural and automobile visualization, and academic research.

In September 2014, a tech demo running on the engine, called "Museum", was revealed. It received a positive reception for the high visual quality of its real-time graphics. In December 2014, Silicon Studio announced the Mizuchi engine will be compatible with the PC at 60 frames per second and the PlayStation 4 at 30 frames per second.

=== Stride ===
Stride, formerly known as Xenko and before that as Paradox, is a game development framework and C# game engine with an asset pipeline and a cross-platform runtime supporting iOS, Android, Windows UWP, Linux, and PlayStation 4. It was made free and open-source software in October 2014. Xenko beta version 1.8x was then released finally out of beta in February 2017. In April 2020, engine was renamed to Stride.
