= Bravely Default =

2012 video game

- European box art
- Developers: Silicon Studio; Cattle Call (HD Remaster)
- Publishers: JP: Square Enix; WW: Nintendo (3DS); WW: Square Enix (HD Remaster)
- Director: Kensuke Nakahara
- Producer: Tomoya Asano
- Designer: Kensuke Nakahara
- Programmer: Takahiro Ushiroda
- Artist: Akihiko Yoshida
- Writers: Naotaka Hayashi; Keiichi Ajiro
- Composer: Revo
- Platforms: Nintendo 3DS; Nintendo Switch 2; Windows; Xbox Series X/S
- Release: October 11, 2012: Flying Fairy; JP: October 11, 2012 For the Sequel; JP: December 5, 2013; EU: December 6, 2013; AU: December 7, 2013; NA: February 7, 2014 HD Remaster; Nintendo Switch 2; June 5, 2025; Windows, Xbox Series X/S; March 12, 2026
- Genre: Role-playing
- Mode: Single-player

Bravely Default, known in Japan as Bravely Default: Flying Fairy, (Note: ブレイブリーデフォルト フライングフェアリー, Bureiburī Deforuto: Furaingu Fearī) is a 2012 role-playing video game developed by Silicon Studio and published by Square Enix for the Nintendo 3DS. It was originally released in 2012 and rereleased as an expanded edition in 2013 subtitled For the Sequel in Japan. For the Sequel was later released in Europe, Australia, and North America in 2014 simply titled as Bravely Default and published by Nintendo in said regions. The gameplay uses a turn-based battle system and job system, in addition to incorporating options to combine job abilities and adjust battle speed and random encounter rates. A high-definition remaster developed by Cattle Call, titled Bravely Default Flying Fairy HD Remaster, was released as a launch title for Nintendo Switch 2 in 2025. Windows and Xbox Series X/S versions launched in 2026.

Bravely Default is set in the world of Luxendarc, which is kept in balance by four elemental crystals protected by the Crystal Orthodoxy, a religious group with influence across the world. The story follows the adventures of four protagonists: Tiz Arrior, the sole survivor from a destroyed village caused by the crystals' blight; Agnès Oblige, vestal of the Wind Crystal, who was forced out of her duties after the crystals were consumed by darkness; Ringabel, an amnesiac wanderer trying to uncover the secrets of a mysterious journal in his possession; and Edea Lee, a defector from a large army bent on capturing Agnès. Together, the party aims to reclaim the four crystals from the darkness and confront a greater evil along the way.

Starting development as an action role-playing sequel to Final Fantasy: The 4 Heroes of Light, it retained elements from the Final Fantasy series while having its own story and gameplay elements. The producer of The 4 Heroes of Light, Tomoya Asano, returned to produce Bravely Default. The story's writer was Naotaka Hayashi, who was brought in from 5pb. due to his work on Steins;Gate. The characters designs were handled by multiple artists, including art director Akihiko Yoshida and manga artist Atsushi Ōkubo. The game was influenced by western video games and television series, and individual elements were inspired by aspects of the Dragon Quest series and Higurashi When They Cry. The music, composed by Revo of Sound Horizon, was intended to evoke the feelings of classic series such as Dragon Quest and SaGa.

Bravely Default was announced in September 2011 as part of Nintendo's 2012 lineup for the platform. In the run-up to release, multiple demos were developed, and the team adjusted the game using feedback from players. For the Sequel was the basis for the overseas release, being localized without any subtitle. In both Japan and overseas, Bravely Default met with strong sales and critical acclaim. Common praise went to the gameplay's mixture of traditional mechanics and new elements, along with its storyline, graphics and music. Main points of criticism were its repetitive late-game stages and elements of its social gameplay. Bravely Default spawned multiple media tie-ins and spin-off games. A direct sequel, Bravely Second: End Layer, was released in 2015 in Japan and 2016 overseas for the Nintendo 3DS, while another sequel set in a new world, Bravely Default II, was released worldwide in 2021 on the Nintendo Switch. The Bravely series has shipped over 3 million copies as of March 2026.

== Gameplay ==
Bravely Default is a role-playing video game which features a party of four characters navigating the fantasy world of Luxendarc. Navigation in towns, dungeons, and the world map environments are presented in an angled, third-person overhead view: the character remains still, the camera zooms out to a distant view. These environments are displayed on the top screen of the Nintendo 3DS system, while the bottom screen displays maps of environments, party stats and other information such as item menus. On the world map, a day–night cycle alters the types of enemies present, and after a certain point in the story, an airship can be used to speed up travel and access previously inaccessible areas. In towns, players can interact with non-playable characters (NPCs), purchase items or magic at specialized shops, buy or sell weapons and equipment at an armory, or rest at an inn to restore health points (HP) and magic points (MP). In all environments, the party can find chests containing items, weapons or equipment. During certain points, a Party Chat option appears, giving players the option of initiating conversations between the party members. During exploration, standard enemies appear through random encounters. Outside battle, the encounter rate can be adjusted from high to nothing. The game features multiple difficulty levels, which can be adjusted freely outside battle.

Outside the main campaign, the game uses networking features powered by the 3DS's StreetPass functionality. A central element is the campaign to reconstruct the village of Norende, destroyed at the beginning of the game. The village is constructed on new ground after obstacles are removed and an area is prepared. The reconstruction incorporates social game elements: friends encountered by the player through StreetPass and online invites become the village's residents, and their efforts are used to create various buildings, including houses and shops. The amount of time a project takes to complete depends on the number of friends assigned to it, taking anywhere from days to weeks. Increasing the number of people speeds up the village's reconstruction. As the reconstruction progresses, the player is awarded with new items and equipment. Individual buildings will gain experience points, granting access to higher-tier rewards, and players have the option of adjusting the types of items rewarded. Special randomly generated optional bosses, known as Nemeses, will appear in the region. Defeating them yields special rewards.

=== Battle system ===
Screenshot of a battle in Bravely Default, showing the party fighting an enemy group. The battle is shown on the upper screen, while the party's command menu is shown below.

Battles come in two types: random encounters with standard enemies, and staged boss battles. The battle system revolves around turn-based combat: each side is allowed to perform an action or multiple actions, with each character having independent movements and commands. These actions include attacking with the equipped weapon, using magic, or using an item. The party also has the option to escape from most battles. Two new options to the battle system are the Brave and Default options. Brave Points (BP) dictate the number of actions a character or enemy can take within a turn, along with being needed for the execution of certain abilities. Party members can utilize BP down into negative figures, enabling up to four actions within a single turn. When the BP gauge is negative, they must wait for the BP counter to reach zero before they can act again. BP are naturally recovered once per turn. Alternately, any party member can Default, which reduces the damage taken by enemy strikes and accumulates BP. An additional power is "Bravely Second", an ability which freezes time for the enemy, allowing a party member to move four times in a single turn with no cost. Bravely Second requires Sleep Points, or SP, a currency which is either replenished while the Nintendo 3DS is in sleep mode or through buying regenerative SP Drinks through microtransactions. Battle speed during combat can be sped up or returned to normal at the player's discretion.

Tied into the battle system is a Job system: beginning with the Freelancer, the party can gain additional Jobs by obtaining gems called "asterisks" from defeated human bosses. Twenty-four Jobs can be found in the game, ranging from the agile Valkyrie to White and Black Mages that respectively specialize in healing and fighting magic. Each Job has different strengths and weaknesses in battle. Outside battle, characters can be assigned any available Job. In addition to the skills of the equipped Job, the skills of a second Job can be learned, allowing for free customization of parties and the mixing of Job abilities in battle. After obtaining the Summoner Job, characters can use summoned monsters to launch attacks that deal high damage to all enemies. Friend characters can also be summoned from other players' games: the more a friend summon is used, the more effective their actions become. Descriptions of defeated enemies, along with story recaps and descriptions of locations, weapons, and Jobs are included in an item called D's Journal.

Within certain conditions, characters can perform Special Moves, customizable powerful moves tied to Jobs: after a Special Move is performed, the entire party is granted buffs for a limited period. This period is represented with a specific tune that plays over normal battle music. Various elements can be added to Special Moves, such as granting elemental properties, launching status ailments at enemies, recovering HP and MP, and temporary status ailment immunity to the party. The customization of Special Moves is directly tied to the creation of specialist shops during the reconstruction of Norende. Experience points acquired at the end of a battle enable characters and their assigned Jobs to level up, unlocking new abilities and boosting character stats such as available HP and MP. Bonuses are gained if the party fulfilled certain conditions. Job abilities and levels can be borrowed from online friends, in a feature called Abilink. Any Job can be borrowed from available players regardless of their current level.

== Plot ==
Luxendarc is thrown into chaos when its four elemental crystals are consumed by darkness. Agnès Oblige, vestal of the Wind Crystal, escapes. Meanwhile, a chasm opens below the town of Norende and destroys it. Its sole survivor, Tiz Arrior, investigates the chasm and meets Agnès and her companion, the fairy Airy. The group is attacked by forces of the Duchy of Eternia, who seek to prevent Agnès from awakening the crystals. After defeating the forces, Tiz travels with Agnès as her protector. Back in Caldisla, the group is joined by Ringabel, an amnesiac vagabond with a mysterious book, and Edea Lee, a soldier who defects from her army. Airy instructs the group on how to awaken the crystals, and the first three crystals are successfully awakened while having Eternia's forces on their trail. As they seek the final crystal, the group is forced to defeat Edea's father, Braev. The Holy Pillar of Light appears; there, the group finds out Edea's close friend, Dark Knight Alternis Dim, looks identical to Ringabel. However, the group is surrounded by bright light and awakens back in Caldisla.

After learning Airy's ritual brought them into a parallel world, the group notices Airy's wings now display the number 4. Unaware of another solution, the group awakens the four crystals and the Holy Pillar of Light, resulting in awakening in another parallel world. While working their way to Airy's pattern reaching 0, the group learns several truths about themselves and their adversaries; nearly all the Eternian forces were hired by Braev out of compassion, as they were rejected by the Orthodoxy to cleanse it of its corruption. Ringabel is revealed to be a parallel Alternis Dim who got dragged into the group's original world, and slowly regains his memories after he witnesses his world's group being killed by Airy after turning into a monster, revealing her true intentions to link all the parallel worlds for her master, the demon Ouroboros, to conquer the Celestial Realm. (Note: After selecting a save file, the game's title changes from Where The Fairy Flies/Flying Fairy to Airy Lies/Lying Airy.)

Should Agnès destroy a crystal, Airy attacks them in a fit of rage before fleeing to the Dark Aurora and being defeated there, warning the group that Ouroboros is still a threat. Should all crystals be awakened, Airy reveals her true intentions and gains her true form in the Dark Aurora. After defeating her, Ouroboros devours her. Tiz learns his life is kept by a being of the Celestial Realm. Ouroboros consumes worlds to regain strength, but the parallel versions of the party break Ouroboros' link, allowing the party to destroy him. The party returns to their world as the links to the parallel worlds close. In the aftermath, Agnès and Edea return to their respective groups to improve the relationship between the reformed Orthodoxy and Eternia. Ringabel returns to his own world to reclaim his true identity. After Tiz releases the Celestial Realm's being within him, he falls into a coma. He later awakens in a life support tank as the mysterious Magnolia Arch rescues him. (Note: As depicted in a special video for Bravely Second: End Layer.)

== Development ==
According to producer Tomoya Asano, Bravely Default began development as a sequel to Final Fantasy: The 4 Heroes of Light (2009), and would have been part of the Final Fantasy franchise. After completing The 4 Heroes of Light, Asano considered what he wanted to do next. Despite having the option to developing something within Square Enix's core franchises, he voluntarily established a new intellectual property. During this initial phase, the original development team reached out to Silicon Studio, whose previous work was mostly related to development middleware. Silicon Studio developed a well-received demo for the project and were assigned to develop the game. Despite moving away from the Final Fantasy series, it retained a battle system and world setting in common with many Final Fantasy games. According to Asano, this was both a leftover of the project's original form and a conscious choice to give players from the Final Fantasy series a sense of comfortable familiarity. In later responses to fan questions, Asano confirmed that he designed the Final Fantasy-style story so players would have little trouble entering the world. The story-telling and gameplay was heavily influenced by western video games and television series. Asano described the result as a "Japanese RPG with American content thrown in". The main challenge for the team was making Bravely Default a traditional RPG without overloading it with nostalgic elements. Despite this, as the team were fans of both Final Fantasy and Dragon Quest, nostalgic features were added for genre veterans and to be appreciated by newcomers. Asano wanted to bring together what he considered the three core elements of RPGs—battles, growth, and connection—in Bravely Default. An important element was creating a casual experience that anyone could enjoy, even if they had never played an RPG.

During development, the team decided to cater to the core Japanese RPG fanbase, as they did not believe the game viable for Western release at the time. At the early stages of development, Bravely Default was going to be an action role-playing game, a genre Silicon Studio had previously worked on with 3D Dot Game Heroes. After developing a prototype build and putting it before Asano, it was decided to make the battle system a traditional turn-based model. The interdependent "Brave" and "Default" mechanics underwent changes during the development process. Initially, Asano envisioned a system akin to the Tension stat used in the Dragon Quest series, but designer Kensuke Nakahara wanted something more exciting for players. He was also annoyed that the majority of bosses in both Dragon Quest and Final Fantasy got two or more actions per turn while player characters only got one each. After some consideration, Nakahara decided on a system where characters could bank points by not taking actions during a turn for later use, or create loan points to act multiple times in a current turn. The concept of "D's Journal", which would offer players deeper insights into the world and characters of Bravely Default, was inspired by a similar system from Higurashi When They Cry. During the late stages of the game's development, the team had to make several last-minute tweaks and changes to ensure the game delivered the best possible performance. Due to the game's chosen mechanics, balancing the game became a major part of later development.

The core concept of Bravely Default was defined by Asano as "everyone can play", as he wanted to bring positive elements from the growing social game market into Bravely Default. The social gameplay was made up of three different elements: the ability to employ StreetPass friends to help reconstruct Norende, the ability to summon friends' characters into battle as a summon, and the "Abilink" option which allowed players to borrow each other's job levels. The initial versions of these functions were not as elaborate as they would become in the final product. Norende village was initially displayed on a single screen, but at a suggestion from Asano, it was enlarged so players needed to slide the display around. The summoning option was initially going to be a simple display of the summoned character, but it was decided to make the summoning sequence more elaborate. The summoning text initially shared fonts with other elements, but as Asano wanted it to have more impact, a more florid font was used. This styling was influenced by a sequence featuring Japanese idol group AKB48 in an unspecified television drama. The usage of StreetPass was incorporated to differentiate Bravely Default from other RPGs of the time, forming part of Asano's wish to create something new. A notable feature included in the game were augmented reality (AR) movies. The AR movies were developed using a software development kit provided by Nintendo and implemented into the game by Silicon Studio. A unique gimmick included in the game was using the platform's camera to project the player's image into an area of the arena during the final boss battle.

The game's music was composed by Revo, the leader of Japanese musical group Sound Horizon. Asano contacted Revo concerning a collaboration, as he had listened to his 2004 album Chronicle 2nd. During his work, Revo was able to see the game's ROM, then discuss the game's vision and development goals with Asano. While the initially agreed track number was between 20 and 30, the number of tracks almost doubled during production as Revo saw situations that needed their own music. Revo aimed for a nostalgic musical style, referencing the music and atmosphere of Final Fantasy, Dragon Quest, and the SaGa series. During recording, tracks were given descriptive working titles, such as "Scene of Normal Battle" or "Song of Asterisk Holder Warfare". Multiple battle songs were created for the game, each having a faster tempo depending on the escalating battle situation. Revo's recording sessions were closely linked with the creation of the game's sound source, so the music would fit onto the 3DS' limited storage space without losing too much of its quality. Once the music was recorded, a sound environment was created so that it could be heard clearly through the 3DS system's speakers. While there were concerns about the 3DS cartridge's storage space limitations, these ultimately proved to be minimal.

=== Scenario and character design ===
The game's title represented the game's main theme of self-reliance: not blindly following the will of others, and following one's own will. "Bravely" symbolized courage, while "Default" symbolized denial. The subtitle was one of many proposed by the team, and was chosen by Asano after it helped give an official name to the character Airy: prior to this point, she had gone unnamed and was generally referred to as a "Navi character". The subtitle was also a coded reference to Airy's true agenda and the game's deliberate removal from the Final Fantasy series. The key words created for the initial draft scenario were "large hole", referring to the Great Chasm beneath Norende, and "parallel world", which referred to the many versions of Luxendarc encountered by players during their journey. The greater majority of the main scenario and side quest storylines were fully voiced, with the main cast having a huge amount of dialogue compared to other characters. The summons were themed after classical elements, modern machinery and multiple world mythologies.

The game's script was written by Naotaka Hayashi, a staff writer at 5pb. whose most notable work at the time was visual novel Steins;Gate. After playing through Steins;Gate on the recommendation of another staff member, Asano decided that Hayashi would be able to create the appealing characters and surprising scenario needed for the story, and asked 5pb. if Hayashi could work on Bravely Default. Another reason Asano wanted Hayashi was due to the plot's heavy use of parallel worlds. Hayashi's work on the game involved creating the plot and character settings. While he wrote the majority of the game's dialogue, more detailed work was given to writers at Square Enix and Silicon Studio. One of the supplementary writers was Silicon Studio's Keiichi Ajiro, who wrote the contents of D's Journal. Ajiro also created the initial story outline with Asano. The initial story concept was kept deliberately simple, but its complexity increased during the writing process. During his work, Hayashi was given guidelines by Square Enix about the characters and story: for instance, Asano wanted the heroes and villains to be equally compelling, along with raising the game's targeted age group. Something that Hayashi needed to remember during the writing process was the need to limit the length of dialogue segments. While visual novels had a high leeway for dialogue quantity, Asano would make requests such as a sentence being within a 22-character limit, and to not overrun into multiple dialogue boxes.

The main character designer and art director was Akihiko Yoshida, whose previous notable works include Final Fantasy Tactics and Tactics Ogre: Let Us Cling Together. In contrast to much of his previous artwork, Yoshida created the game's artwork using a stronger design and coloring style. His artwork for Agnès was designed to represent her solitude and knowledge of her fate while also displaying cuteness and motherliness. Tiz's design was designed not to convey a strong personality, as he in part represented the player. For the game's environmental artwork, Yoshida drew on European children's literature. The in-game environments such as towns and the overworld were created using specially drawn art mapped to a pseudo-3D layout. This style was meant to emulate classic picture books. Finalization of the art style took a long period, going through extensive trial and error. Designs for many of the secondary characters were handled by other artists: Atsushi Ōkubo, who had most notably worked on the Soul Eater manga series, designed Einheria and the Valkyrie job outfits. Erutus Profiteur and the Merchant job were designed by Hideki Ishikawa, whose work included character designs for Lord of Vermilion arcade game series. Kamiizumi and the Swordmaster job were designed by Dorin Makoto, who had most notably worked on the Sengoku Basara series. Red Mage Flore DeRossa and the Red Mage job were designed by Take, who worked on the Katanagatari light novel series. Qada and the Salve Maker job were designed by Midori Foo, an artist who had worked on multiple light novels and online games.

== Release ==
Bravely Default was first announced in September 2011 under its original Japanese title as part of Nintendo's 2012 lineup for the 3DS, alongside titles such as Monster Hunter 4 and Fire Emblem Awakening. Between February and September 2012, five different demos were released through Nintendo eShop. The first demo featured Agnès and demonstrated character control. The second, released in March, featured the character Tiz and town exploration. The third demo, released in June, showcased the battle system and introduced Edea. The fourth demo, released in August, featured the character Ringabel and demonstrated the job and character customization systems. The fifth and final demo, released in September, included features from all the previous demos and included elements such as Friend Summons, and the Abilink and Norende reconstruction social elements. With the release of the fifth demo, the other demos were discontinued. The demos were developed alongside the main game as stand-alone experiences taken from several points within the game. They also ended up providing the team with feedback for gameplay adjustments. Each demo included an AR movie featuring one of the main cast.

Bravely Default released on October 11, 2012. It was published by Square Enix. Along with the standard edition, Square Enix created a collector's edition for exclusive sale through their online store. The collector's edition featured an AR poster, a first print copy of the game's soundtrack, an artbook, and a themed 3DS protective case. Downloadable content in the form of additional character costumes were made available both through promotional codes and post-release content. An updated edition of the game, titled Bravely Default: For the Sequel, (Note: ブレイブリーデフォルト フォーザ・シークウェル, Bureiburī Deforuto: Fōza Shīkuweru) was announced in August 2013 in Weekly Shōnen Jump for a release on December 5 that year. For the Sequel was stated to have over a hundred different improvements and adjustments: these included additional save slots, additional difficulty levels, auto saving options, the addition of new subevent scenes, new gameplay elements such as the "Bravely Second" ability, and subtitles in multiple languages. Many of these alterations were based on questionnaires sent out by the company after the original version's release. According to staff, For the Sequel was intended as a "trial version" for its sequel, already in development after the success of Bravely Default.

=== Bravely Default: Flying Fairy HD Remaster ===
Bravely Default: Flying Fairy HD Remaster was announced for the Nintendo Switch 2 during a Nintendo Direct presentation on April 2, 2025. It was released on June 5, 2025, as a launch title for the console. It features new minigames, upgraded online features, a new user interface, and other quality of life improvements. The game's Windows and Xbox Series X/S versions were released on March 12, 2026.

=== Localization ===
Prior to any official announcement of its Western release, Bravely Default was cited by multiple journalists as a game that should be localized for Western markets. In October 2012, Asano stated that there were no plans to localize the game, but that fans should continue inquiring so that their wishes were made clear. A localization was officially announced in April 2013. Nintendo took charge of publishing duties overseas. The Western version was based on the For the Sequel expanded version. It released in Europe on December 6, 2013. An earlier false report in Nintendo's financial report indicated that its European release would be in 2014, but this was later corrected by Nintendo of Europe. In Australia, it released on December 7. In North America, it released on February 7, 2014. Both in North America and the UK, a collector's edition was created including the soundtrack, an artbook, and over thirty AR cards. The UK edition also included a figurine of Agnès. The game was also released in South Korea on April 16, although it was not localized into Korean, placing it in contrast with other Nintendo releases such as Shin Megami Tensei IV.

The localization itself was handled by Bill Black and his company Binari Sonori, whose previous work included Demons' Score for Square Enix and World of Warcraft: The Burning Crusade for Blizzard Entertainment. Another key staff member was Timothy Law, a localization editor from Square Enix who supervised the translation and voice recording for the title. An element of the localization that provided a challenge was creating a sense of wordplay equivalent with that used in the original Japanese. An example of this was the Performer job and its owner, the latter of which needed to have her first name adjusted while taking into consideration European gender perceptions. Another example from the dialogue was the need to create jokes that would not work in Japanese, such as Agnès commenting on finding a "lucky charm". The subtitle "Flying Fairy" was removed for the Western release as it might have given a false impression of family-friendly content due to different cultural perceptions from Japan. The English voice actors were chosen to sound as similar as possible to their Japanese counterparts, and adjustments were made to characters through the actors' performances: these included making Ringabel more flirtatious, and adjusting Edea's growl of rage between language versions. The game uses both the English and Japanese audio, along with subtitles in multiple languages. The Western localization of the game contains censorship related to some sexually suggestive material in the original game: the ages of the main characters were increased to no longer be underage by Western standards, with 15-year-olds being changed to be 18-year-olds, and two of the female playable characters' costumes were altered to make them less revealing.

== Reception ==
Reception

Aggregate scores
Aggregator	Score
Metacritic	3DS: 85/100 (Note: Score based on 67 reviews); NS2: 84/100 (Note: Score based on 59 reviews)
OpenCritic	81% recommend (Note: Score based on 48 reviews); 89% recommend (HD) (Note: Score based on 66 reviews)

Review scores
Publication	Score
Edge	8/10
Electronic Gaming Monthly	8/10
Eurogamer	8/10
Famitsu	38/40
Game Informer	8/10
GameSpot	8.5/10
GameTrailers	8.5/10
IGN	8.6/10
Official Nintendo Magazine	90%
Polygon	8/10
Hardcore Gamer	5/5
RPGamer	4/5

Bravely Default received "generally favorable" reviews according to review aggregator Metacritic, with 81% of critics recommending the game according to OpenCritic. Flying Fairy HD Remaster also received "generally favorable" reviews according to Metacritic, with 89% of critics recommending the game according to OpenCritic.

The story was met with positive reviews. Famitsu was highly positive about the story, although the reviewers did not go into specifics. Edge Magazine called the narrative "rich and detailed", enjoying the twists put on the present genre tropes and the darker narrative elements despite the experience being undermined by the writing quality. Andrew Fitch of Electronic Gaming Monthly found the story and characters enjoyable, and in some cases "stellar", while Ben Moore of GameTrailers noted the story's aversion to take risks despite interesting twists, and found that it was bogged down by advanced foreshadowing of major plot twists. Game Informer's Jeff Marchiafava found the game's story and characters to be "rife with clichés", and called the dialogue "excessively wordy" despite the late-game developments improving on both aspects. Simon Parkin, writing for Eurogamer, found the story less "unusual" than other aspects, but praised its willingness to send itself up and enjoyed Hayashi's subtle subversion of genre tropes. GameSpot's John Robertson was fairly negative, saying that it started out poorly and never managed to throw off that initial impression. David Evans of IGN praised the characters for their strength, but found that the story's pacing struggled at times. Danielle Riendeau of Polygon, despite finding many characters appealing, called the story "more like a pastiche of tropes than its own unique take [on the genre]". Chandra Nair of Official Nintendo Magazine called story and character development "extremely impressive", while Bradly Halestorm of Hardcore Gamer found the story to be solid and the main cast enjoyable. Alex Fuller of RPGamer found the main cast quite enjoyable, praising their Party Chat interactions, and enjoyed the story despite its initial overly straightforward premise.

The gameplay was praised overall. The Edge reviewer greatly enjoyed the deceptively simple Brave and Default mechanics despite a run time they described as "bloated". Fitch likewise enjoyed the gameplay mechanics, but found the social elements to be less successful despite not actively irritating him. Moore praised the battle system and implementation of the Job system, although the latter necessitated grinding to unlock its full value. He also praised the ability to adjust encounter rates and battle speed, and positively noted the social features as engaging secondary activities. Marchiafava found that the battle and Job systems held up throughout the entire game, and like Moore found the social systems enjoyable. Nair was positive about the depth and strategy the gameplay opened up, despite criticizing the number of options increasing the amount of time spent in battle. Both Evans and Robertson praised the battle system and general gameplay, with Robertson calling the former innovative within the genre. Riendeau found that the battle system's depth and quality gave her feelings of elation when she successfully killed opponents, but also saw the need to grind for experience emerging during the later stages of the game negatively impacted the experience. Parkin referred to the Brave and Default mechanics as the game's "central – and brilliant – conceit". Fuller, while finding the microtransactions a "waste of money", greatly enjoyed the battle mechanics and multiple user-friendly features. Halestorm shared the positive opinions of other reviewers on the battle system, alongside praising the game's amount and quality of content. Many reviewers positively compared the gameplay and style to earlier Final Fantasy games. Multiple Western reviewers commented negatively on the repetitive late-game section.

The graphics and presentation garnered mixed opinions. Famitsu praised the game's graphics, while Edge admired the art style and monster design, and was glad that the hardware limitations faced by The 4 Heroes of Light were not present in Bravely Default. Marchiafava called the graphics "beautiful" and praised the soundtrack, though called the English voice acting "hit or miss". Fuller was less impressed by the visuals, but found the music to be excellent. Halestorm, while he did not think the graphics were the best to be found on the 3DS, praised their stylized appearance and the well-executed 3D effect, and called the soundtrack "downright hypnotizing". Nair praised the game's audio despite little variety in the musical score, and called its visuals "gorgeous". Evans praised the character art for its "simple and striking" appearance, and its stylized background artwork. Riendeau commented that the game's aesthetic kept her invested when the story failed to do so. Parkin referred to the background artwork as "like nothing else". Robertson referred to the game's art style as "striking and engaging".

=== Sales ===
In its debut week, Bravely Default topped gaming charts with sales of 141,529 units, noted as being an impressive debut for a new game. It had a sell-through rate of over 85%. Its sales and sell-through rate were notably higher than those of its predecessor The 4 Heroes of Light. By late January 2013, shipments and eventually sales of the game reached 300,000 copies in Japan. For the Sequel debuted at #8 in gaming charts, selling 35,617 units. By 2014, For the Sequel had sold 59,300 units, making it the 160th best-selling game of that year. In North America, Bravely Default met with strong debut sales, reaching #10 in NPD Group's sales charts and selling 200,000 copies. In July 2014, it was reported that Bravely Default had sold one million copies worldwide: 400,000 units were sold in Japan, while 600,000 were sold overseas.

=== Accolades ===
Famitsu awarded the game its "Rookie Award" at its 2012 Awards event, while it received the 2012 Dengeki Online Consumer Award, the latter award being given while beating Persona 4 Golden (2nd) and Rune Factory 4 (3rd). At the Japan Game Awards, it received the Future Game Award in 2012 and the Excellence Award in 2013. It later won GameSpot's 3DS Game of the Year 2014 award. At the 2014 National Academy of Video Game Trade Reviewers (NAVGTR) awards, Bravely Default was nominated for the Game, Original Role Playing category. During the 18th Annual D.I.C.E. Awards, the Academy of Interactive Arts & Sciences nominated Bravely Default for "Handheld Game of the Year" and "Role-Playing/Massively Multiplayer Game of the Year". It was ranked by both IGN and GameSpot as one of the best games on the system in 2013 and 2014 respectively.

== Sequels ==
The game's success, which went against Square Enix's presumptions due to the title's identity as a traditional role-playing game, prompted them to reconsider their game making strategy, which up to that point had been geared towards developing titles tailored for Western markets rather than focusing on the Japanese market. According to the developers, none of them believed that the game would be released overseas, and were overwhelmed by the positive fan feedback they had received. A manga titled Bravely Default: Flying Fairy began serialization online through Famitsu. Two compilation volumes were released in 2015 and 2016 respectively. Two supplementary books, released under the title Bravely Default: The Pocketbook of R, (Note: ブレイブリーデフォルト Rの手帳, Bureiburī Deforuto: Aru no Techō) were released in December 2013. In addition to this, two drama CDs containing supplementary stories were released through 2013 and 2014. Music from the game was featured in Theatrhythm Final Fantasy as DLC.

A browser game spin-off titled Bravely Default: Praying Brage began an open beta on November 11, 2012. Developed by NHN Hangame, Praying Brage takes place 200 years after the original game, and includes a new cast of characters aligned to four forces themed after Luxendarc's elemental crystals. Another spin-off, Bravely Archive: D's Report, was released for mobile devices on January 22, 2015. Like Praying Brage, it was set far in the future, followed an alternate scenario stemming from the events of Bravely Default, and featured characters from Praying Brage. By August of that year, D's Report had reached over four million downloads. A sequel was confirmed as being in development as early as 2013. The new game, Bravely Second: End Layer, was officially announced in December 2013. It released in Japan in 2015 and overseas in 2016. In an interview with Japanese magazine Dengeki, Asano said that he would ideally like to release a new Bravely game every year. Following the second game's release, Asano would partner with Square Enix producer Masashi Takahashi and the studio Acquire to develop a new traditional role-playing game that reconsidered their expectations after witnessing the reception to the Bravely series. This game, which would become Octopath Traveler, was announced in January 2017 and initially released worldwide for the Nintendo Switch in July 2018.

A third entry in the Bravely series, Bravely Default II, was announced at The Game Awards 2019 exclusively for the Nintendo Switch. Two years prior to the game's announcement on Christmas Day 2017, character designer Akihiko Yoshida posted an image on Twitter of Edea holding a pair of Joy-Con controllers. Additionally after Octopath Traveler sold over 1 million copies, the occasion was celebrated with another illustration on Twitter, with the pose assumed by the eight party members strongly resembling Airy from the first game. Upon being asked why the game was titled Bravely Default II despite being the third entry in the series, series producer Asano explained it was because he felt that Bravely Second, the actual second game in the series, had "parts that did not meet the expectations of fans." He initially felt it would be difficult to continue the Bravely series, but the success of the Japan-only mobile game Bravely Default: Fairy's Effect and Octopath Traveler inspired the development team to revisit the series and led to planning of another entry. Similar to how numbered sequels function in the Final Fantasy franchise, this new installment takes place in a new world separate from the previous games with a brand new cast of characters. The game was released worldwide on February 26, 2021.

== See also ==
- List of Square Enix video game franchises
