= Bravely Second: End Layer =

2015 video game

- European box art
- Developer: Silicon Studio
- Publishers: JP: Square Enix; WW: Nintendo
- Directors: Kensuke Nakahara; Keita Oka
- Producers: Tomoya Asano; Masashi Takahashi
- Designer: Hajime Onuma
- Programmers: Takahiro Ushiroda; Kei Sone
- Artist: Akihiko Yoshida
- Writers: Tomoya Asano; Shinji Takahashi; Souki Tsukishima
- Composer: Ryo
- Platform: Nintendo 3DS
- Release: JP: April 23, 2015; EU: February 26, 2016; AU: February 27, 2016; NA: April 15, 2016
- Genre: Role-playing
- Mode: Single-player

Bravely Second: End Layer (Note: Bravely Second: End Layer (Japanese: ブレイブリーセカンド エンドレイヤー, Hepburn: Bureiburī Sekando: Endo Reiyā)) is a 2015 role-playing video game developed by Silicon Studio for the Nintendo 3DS handheld console and is the direct sequel to Bravely Default. It was published by Square Enix in Japan on April 23, 2015, and an English version by Nintendo in North America, Europe, and Australia in 2016.

Set two and half years after the events of the previous game, the story follows Yew Geneolgia, who journeys across Luxendarc to rescue Agnès Oblige, the previous game’s protagonist, from a powerful warlord known as Kaiser. Along the way, he is joined by returning characters Edea and Tiz, and a mysterious woman from the moon named Magnolia.

The game received generally positive reviews, though some felt that it was inferior to its predecessor.

== Gameplay ==
Bravely Second is a traditional role-playing video game with turn-based action, and retains the battle system of its predecessor Bravely Default. This allows players to build up "Brave Points" (BP), or the number of user turns per character at any given time. On any turn, characters can "Default", or guard, and gain an additional Brave Points, or BP, to act multiple times on the same turn.

New to the game is a chain-battle feature where a player who defeats a random encounter may continue to battle enemies in succession for greater risks and rewards. Players can receive up to three times the amount of experience and money. This also allows the player to level up each character's "Job Points" (JP). Each character has access to many different Jobs (up to a total of 30) by gaining that Job's asterisk. The asterisk is usually held by another character in game world with that class.

Bravely Default's sidequests have been revamped; players encounter two Eternian asterisk holders in an argument about an ethical dilemma, and the player must resolve the conflict with the reward being the loser's asterisk. This locks out the other asterisk until much further progress has been made. A similar feature to the first game's reconstruction of Norende also appears, but this time involves rebuilding Magnolia's homeland on the moon.

== Synopsis ==
Two and a half years after the events of Bravely Default, Agnès Oblige has been elected the Pope of the Crystal Orthodoxy. She and Grand Marshal Braev Lee of the Duchy of Eternia seek to end hostilities between their groups with a formal peace treaty in the city of Gathelatio. The ceremony is interrupted by Kaiser Oblivion, leader of the Glanz Empire, and his cryst-fairy companion Anne, who abduct Agnès and imprison her in their floating fortress, the Skyhold. Yew Geneolgia, leader of Agnès' Crystalguard protectors, awakens a week after the attack and sets out to rescue her with fellow Crystalguard leaders Janne Engarde and Nikolai Nikolanikov. However, Janne and Nikolai are revealed to be moles for the Empire. Later guided by Agnès through a crystal shard she dropped when she was kidnapped, Yew assembles three companions: Eternian Ducal Guard captain Edea Lee, the daughter of Braev who aided Agnès in their first adventure, Magnolia Arch, a young Ba'al Buster from the moon who is the sole survivor of an attack on her village and possesses an hourglass capable of localized time manipulation, and Tiz Arrior, a former comrade of Agnès and Edea who has been comatose for the past two and a half years. The group is unable to prevent the Kaiser from escaping in the Skyhold.

With the guidance of both Agnès and a mysterious "man with a purple pen," the party pursues the Skyhold across the world. During their travels, the Kaiser obtains a compass of space and time. The party also learns about the Sword of the Brave, a cursed sword that took Yew's older half-brother Denys' right arm after he tried to claim it; he was disinherited and vanished soon after. At the Fire Temple in Eisenberg, following their encounter with the mysterious Kyubi, the group finds the Fire Crystal has been overcharged and realizes that the Kaiser is summoning the Holy Pillar. The group hurries to Florem to intercept the Empire at the Water Crystal, where the man with the purple pen reveals himself to be a Celestial Being named Altair, who has possessed Tiz after the Soulstone containing his soul was given to Tiz by the party during his sleep in the vivipod at Eternian Central Command. Meanwhile, the Kaiser forces Agnès to dispel the shield around the Water Crystal and overcharge it to summon the Holy Pillar. The party attacks the Skyhold and kills Janne and Nikolai, both revealed to oppose the Orthodoxy due to its past corruption. Their deaths buy time for the Kaiser to use the compass to travel back in time with Agnès, but Anne has already sabotaged the compass to send the two to the distant future as she uses the Holy Pillar's power to destroy the Moon. The party defeats Anne in battle, but the destruction of the Moon ceases the flow of time and places the world in a state that would eventually end in inevitable destruction.

The party uses Magnolia's hourglass to go back in time to the peace ceremony and stop the Kaiser from abducting Agnès, learning his true identity is Yew's missing brother Denys. Denys escapes with the aid of Janne and Nikolai, but the party utilizes their memories of the previous timeline to stop Denys' plans while convincing his subordinates not to throw their lives away. Yew eventually corners Denys in the Geneolgia crypts, learning his brother's intent to use the compass to travel back in time to kill their family's founder to negate the corrupt misdeeds caused by their bloodline. Yew defeats Denys, and Agnès and Braev convince him to own up to his mistakes and create a world of peace in the present. However, Anne forces a Vestling to manifest the Holy Pillar to destroy the moon once again before Denys destroys her brooch. Anne responds by awakening Diamante, the Ba'al that ravaged Magnolia's home and concealed itself as the Skyhold to destroy the group. Denys sacrifices himself by using the compass to send himself and Diamante to the end of time.

The party awakens in Caldisla, which Kyubi had displaced prior, and confronts Anne when she attempts to use Norende's Great Chasm to summon Ba'als directly to Luxendarc. She reveals she is the older sister of Tiz and Edea's old enemy Airy; she manipulated them into defeating Airy as the intrusion of her "god" Ouroboros would pose a threat to her master Providence, the so-called "god" of the Celestial Realm. Anne explains that Providence created the Ba'als using the memories of Altair's lover Vega. After killing Anne, the group enters the Celestial Realm and frees Vega from Providence's control. After Altair and Vega depart in peace, the group is attacked by Providence, who breaks the fourth wall and attempts to delete the player's save file. The party stops Providence and destroys him.

When the group returns to Luxendarc, Tiz is revealed to be dying again now that Altair's soul has left him. A mysterious Adventurer, who has provided aid to Tiz since Norende's destruction, appears and takes Magnolia's hourglass back in time to give to Tiz at the start of his original adventure. The Adventurer, revealing herself to be a colleague of Altair's named Deneb, returns and informs the group that the hourglass, now with two and a half years' worth of hopes and dreams, will be able to renew his life. Agnès, possessing the hourglass, delivers it to the party and revives Tiz.

In the game's epilogue, Agnès retires from her duties as the pope and settles down in Norende with Tiz while Edea sets out as the new Grand Marshall to secure the peace between Eternia and the Orthodoxy. Magnolia decides to remain on Luxendarc with Yew, and the two confess their love for each other. In a post-credits scene, having interacted with the party under the guise of their world's Alternis Dim in their dealings with Kyubi and the Empire, Tiz and Edea's old companion Ringabel is revealed to have become an agent of an interdimensional police force called the Planeswardens. He gives the Planeswardens confirmation that the Sword of the Brave exists.

== Development ==
As early as December 2012, talks of a sequel to Bravely Default arose, with producer Tomoya Asano requesting feedback from fans to be used for a sequel to the game. Discussions of a sequel arose again in June 2013, when game developer Yasumi Matsuno announced that character designer and lead artist Akihiko Yoshida was working on a Bravely Default sequel. In August 2013, Square Enix announced Bravely Default: For the Sequel, an updated version of the original that would implement new gameplay ideas developed for a sequel in the series. The name "Bravely Second" was trademarked as early as September 2013. The game's title was announced as Bravely Second in a December 2013 issue of Jump magazine, being named after a gameplay mechanic from Bravely Default: For the Sequel. Upon announcement, the game's only announced platform was the Nintendo 3DS. The game was approximately 30% complete around the time of its announcement.

In December 2013, it was revealed that Yoshida had left Square Enix. Despite this, he states he still plans on continuing to work on the Bravely series, and Bravely Second will still retain the same anime art style established in the first game, albeit with characters having slightly more realistic proportions, being slightly less chibi. Initial brainstorming led to ideas such as having Magnolia wear a space suit or bunny ears, but this was ultimately scrapped to pursue a more "adult look", something the developers felt was missing in the first title. Asano also confirmed that the game will stay story driven as opposed to exploration driven, as with the first game. In April 2014, producer Tomoya Asano announced in Famitsu magazine's rumor column that the scenario for the game was completed. In late July 2014, Famitsu revealed that Revo would not be returning to compose the soundtrack for the game due to conflicting schedules, and that Ryo from the band Supercell would be taking his place.

On December 10, 2014, a trial version of the game was released on the Japanese Nintendo eShop. A demo was released ahead of the game's full release, by Nintendo eShop download only, and contained content not present in the final game. The demo, released as Bravely Second: The Ballad of the Three Cavaliers, allowed players to sample ten classes, as well as roughly ten hours of gameplay. Some items that were collected in the demo can transfer into the full game.

== Reception ==
Reception

Aggregate scores
Aggregator	Score
Metacritic	81/100
OpenCritic	77% recommend

Review scores
Publication	Score
Destructoid	7/10
Eurogamer	Recommended
Famitsu	36/40
Game Informer	7.5/10
GameRevolution	9/10
GameSpot	7/10
GamesRadar+	3.5/5
Hardcore Gamer	4.5/5
IGN	7.1/10
Nintendo Life	9/10
Polygon	7/10
RPGamer	4/5
RPGFan	85/100
Shacknews	8/10
USgamer	4.5/5
VentureBeat	90/100

Bravely Second received generally positive reviews. Praise went towards the gameplay following on from the original game, criticism went mostly towards lack of differentiation from its predecessor, and mixed reactions towards its writing compared to that of the prior game.

In their review, Famitsu gave the game the score 36 of 40, consisting of the sub-scores 9, 9, 9, and 9. Siliconera detailed and translated a series of responses from Japanese players including praise for the "Consecutive Chance" feature and criticism for overuse of memes and modern language and slang drawing comparisons to Hyperdimension Neptunia.

Janine Hawkins from Polygon criticized the lack of innovation from its predecessor but praised the world and the writing, saying "The world is beautifully realized, and the writing is enjoyable"; Hawkins summarized her review as "Bravely Second takes after its predecessor almost to a fault."

Mike Mahardy from GameSpot said "One could argue it feels more like an exceptional expansion than a true sequel" citing how "the combat, despite its sleek design, doesn't make any major improvements on the well established formula." Criticizing the writing, he adds "But in the end, Bravely Second transcends the limitations that its poor writing and redundant storyline create."

=== Sales ===
Bravely Second was the best-selling video game in Japan during its debut week, with 100,047 copies sold and 53.6% of the initial shipment sold out. This was a lower debut than that of the original Bravely Default; during its launch week, 141,529 copies were sold, which corresponded to 85.68% of its first shipment. By April 2017, 700,000 copies had been sold worldwide.

In North America, the game was the ninth best-selling game of its debut month of April 2016, a feat deemed particularly impressive by VentureBeat, which noted was rare for a physical release of a niche genre like a JRPG. In the United Kingdom, the game debuted at #12 on the All-Formats chart and #9 on the individual format chart that ranks the releases of multi-platform games per console as opposed to title. During its debut week, it was the highest-selling game on a Nintendo platform.

== Sequel ==
A third entry in the Bravely series, Bravely Default II, was announced at The Game Awards 2019 and released worldwide in February 2021. It takes place in a separate different world than prior games. Series producer Tomoya Asano stated that the reason for the game being titled Bravely Default II despite being the third game in the series was due to his belief that Bravely Second had "parts that did not meet the expectations of fans." He initially felt it would be difficult to continue the Bravely series in the future, until the success of the Japan-only mobile game Bravely Default: Fairy's Effect and the Nintendo Switch game Octopath Traveler afterwards caused the development team to state they wanted to create a new game in the series, which inspired Asano and led to planning of another entry.
