= Skin gambling =

Betting of virtual goods via professional matches or other games of chance

In video games, skin gambling (also known as skin betting) is the use of virtual goods, often cosmetic in-game items such as "skins", as virtual currency to bet on the outcome of professional matches or on other games of chance. It is commonly associated with the community surrounding Counter-Strike 2 (the successor to Counter-Strike: Global Offensive), but the practice exists in other games such as Electronic Arts's FIFA. Valve, the developer of the Counter-Strike series, also runs the Steam marketplace which can be interfaced by third-parties to enable trading, buying, and selling of skins from players' Steam inventories for real-world or digital currency. Valve condemns the gambling practices as it violates the platform's terms of service.

Valve added random skin rewards as part of an update to Global Offensive in 2013, believing that players would use these to trade with other players and bolster both the player community and its Steam marketplace. A number of websites were created to bypass monetary restrictions Valve set on the Steam marketplace to aid in high-value trading and allowing users to receive cash value for skins. Some of these sites subsequently added the ability to gamble on the results of professional matches or in games of chance with these skins, which in 2016 was estimated to handle around $5 billion of the virtual goods. These sites, along with Valve and various video game streamers, have come under scrutiny due to ethical and legal questions relating to gambling on sporting matches, underage gambling, undisclosed promotion, and outcome rigging. Evidence of such unethical practices was discovered in June 2016, and led to two formal lawsuits filed against these sites and Valve in the following month. Valve subsequently has taken steps to stop such sites from using Steam's interface for enabling gambling, leading to about half of these sites closing down while driving more of the skin gambling into an underground economy.

== Counter-Strike ==
Counter-Strike is a series of team-based first-person shooter developed by Valve that debuted in 1999. Players in the game take the role of a terrorist or a counter-terrorist, with each team having a unique goal to complete before they are eliminated by the opposing team or before the timed round is completed. For example, the terrorist team may be required to plant and defend a bomb at a specific site, while the counter-terrorists must eliminate the terrorists before it can be planted, or disarm the bomb once it has been activated.

=== Introduction of skins ===
The introduction of the Arms Deal update to Counter-Strike: Global Offensive in August 2013 added cosmetic items termed "skins" into the PC versions of the game. The developers had considered other types of customization drops for the game before coming to weapon skins; they had ruled out on player skins, since Global Offensive is a first-person shooter and the player would not see their customization, as well as new weapons, fearing this would imbalance the game. Following the model they used for Team Fortress 2, Valve enabled players to be rewarded with random skin drops as they played matches which would be stored in their user inventory within Steam, Valve's software delivery and storefront client. Limited-time "souvenir" skins could also be earned by watching competitive Global Offensive matches within the game or through a Twitch account linked to a Steam account. Unlike Team Fortress 2, the Global Offensive skins do not have any direct impact on gameplay, only influencing the look of a player's weapon. Skins, unique to specific in-game weapons, are given several qualities, including a rarity that determines how often a player might acquire one by a random in-game drop just by playing the game or as in-game rewards, and an appearance quality related to how worn the gun appeared.

These skins were added to try to unify and increase the player size of the community, who were split between Global Offensive, Counter-Strike v1.6, and Counter-Strike: Source. According to Valve's Kyle Davis, the introduction of skins to Global Offensive was to encourage more players for the game by providing them free virtual items simply by playing the game which they could then use as part of the Steam Marketplace to trade with others, boosting the Marketplace's own economy. The Arms Deal update drew an audience back to the game, with a six-fold increase in the average number of players from the previous year about seven months after its release.

Initially, Valve had considered skins that appeared as camouflage would be more desirable to help hide on some maps, but found there was more community interest in bright, colorful skins that made their weapons appear like paintball guns. The addition of skins made the game attractive to expert players, as the skins could be taken as a kind of trophy, showing off to other players how serious of a player they were. Valve's CEO Gabe Newell described the offering of skins as an "investment" that would retain some nominal value well after the player stopped playing the game, though Newell noted Valve had concerns about factors that might fall outside of their control with the feature.

In 2023, Valve released the successor to Global Offensive, Counter-Strike 2. Players' inventories of digital goods were automatically transferred over from CS:GO over to CS2, with the skins recreated in the new game. In the year 2023 alone, it was estimated that Valve earned US$1 billion from the sale of weapons case keys and commission from user-to-user trades in the Steam marketplace.

=== Value ===
Because of the rarity and other qualities, certain skins are highly sought after by players. Skins are a form of virtual currency, with some items like special cosmetic knives worth thousands of United States dollars. This virtual currency is further impacted by the game giving out "weapon cases" that contain an unknown randomized skin, which can only be opened by purchasing a key in the in-game store for $2.49. The most common skins that can be obtained have a value far less than the cost of the key, so the player would effectively lose money if they bought a key and found a common skin. Because of this, cases are also part of the virtual currency within Counter-Strike.

Global Offensive is not the first video game where players have traded, sold, or bought virtual in-game items, but the ease of accessing and transferring through the Steam Marketplace made it a successful virtual economy. However, with increased monetary values placed on some skins, the Steam Marketplace became infeasible for some. The Steam Marketplace only allows sales up to $1800, with all transactions subject to a 15% fee collected by Valve. Trades and purchases via the Steam Marketplace require players to add funds to their Steam Wallets to purchase skins from others, with those funds being placed in the Wallet of the seller. Valve does not allow these funds to be taken out as real-world money, as it would be require being regulated as a bank. Websites opened up that used the Steamworks application programming interface (API) to link players' inventory to these sites as to manage the trading of Counter-Strike skins while enabling users to spend more and receive money through other online banking/payment sites like PayPal or using digital currency like Bitcoin, and bypass Valve's transaction fee. However, these third-party sites did not only facilitate gambling: many also functioned as marketplaces for high-value skin trading and cash-outs outside the Steam Community Market. Major platforms in this ecosystem included Buff, a marketplace owned by Chinese technology company NetEase, CS.Money, DMarket, and other external trading platforms.

Valve introduced an update to CS2 in October 2025 which added the ability for players to trade in five skins of a specific rarity in exchange for a higher rarity skin. This feature quickly diluted the market for the rarer skins since acquiring them had become easier, and within a few days the skins market lost an estimated $2 to $3 billion in value, roughly 28% of the total market.

=== Esports ===
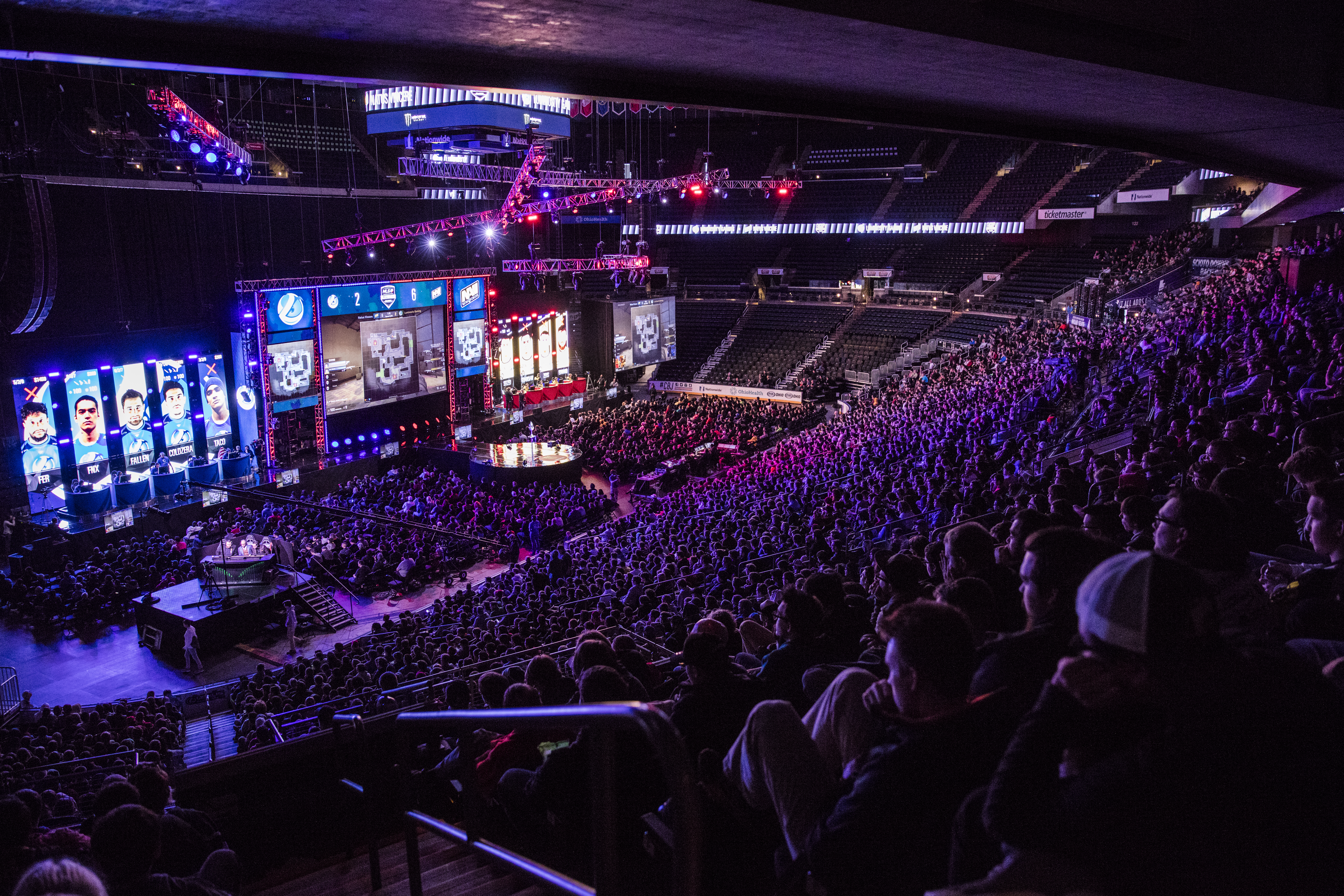
Skin gambling for Global Offensive grew as the game became popular as an esport, such as this Major League Gaming event in 2016.

The player community for Global Offensive grew quickly following the addition of skins, further enabled by the growth of streaming services like Twitch. Valve promoted features into Global Offensive that made it favorable for professional play (esports), including sponsoring its own tournament. Several teams arose from high-ranking players, creating viewing opportunities during tournaments; this was further enhanced by the ability for viewers to earn "spectator" skins simply by watching these matches. Compared to League of Legends, one of the most-watched eSports in 2013, Global Offensive is considered an easier game for spectators to understand and follow, making it more attractive for viewing audiences. Within a year of the Arms Deal update, Global Offensive has seen a significant turnaround in player counts, and is poised to be a major esport. More than eight million players played Global Offensive by September 2015, and as of April 2016, Global Offensive was one of the top five games watched on Twitch, peaking at more than 525,000 concurrent viewers during a championship round. At the start of 2016, Global Offensive was poised to be the largest growing esport that year.

== Gambling ==
As esports have grown in viewership, so has the demand for esports gambling. Outside of the United States, several sites arose to allow users to bet with direct cash funds on the result of matches from games like Global Offensive, Dota 2, and League of Legends. Cash gambling on sports, including esports, had been banned in some European countries, and, up through May 2018, in all but four states within the United States under the Professional and Amateur Sports Protection Act of 1992 (PASPA). With the decision in the Supreme Court case Murphy v. National Collegiate Athletic Association that ruled PASPA unconstitutional, states are now free to enable sports gambling, including for esports. American case law has also determined that the use of virtual goods for betting on the outcome of matches is legal and not covered under gambling laws. Companies like Blizzard Entertainment and Riot Games have made strong delineations between virtual currencies and real money to stay within these prior rulings while offering betting on matches within their games using strictly virtual funds.

Some of the websites created to help with trading of Global Offensive skins started offering mechanisms for gambling with skins, appearing to avoid the conflation with real-world currency. These originated as sites that allowed players to use skins to bet on esport matches. Players would bet one or more skins from their Steam inventory, which are then moved to an account managed by the gambling site. Upon winning, the player would be given back their skins and a distribution of the skins that the losing players had offered.

Over time, other sites started to expand beyond esports betting and instead offered betting on games of chance. Jackpot-like sites were introduced, where users can put their skins into the pot, which will end in one person winning. The higher total value, the more chance the user would have to win. A few sites reduced the gambling to betting on the result of a single coin flip. Some sites also offered unopened weapon crates for purchase with skins. In combination with the gambling features, players could then trade skins that they had won for their cash value through these sites, or purchase skins with currency to gamble further. The exact timing for the growth of these gambling sites is unclear, but Chris Grove, an analyst for Eilers & Krejcik Gaming and Narus Advisors, observed as early as August 2015 that skins were being used for betting on esports. At that time, the use of skins for gambling on more traditional games of chance was not readily apparent.

These sites have created a type of black market around Global Offensive skins, generally unregulated by Valve. The exact monetary values processed by these skin gambling sites are difficult to measure because of the opaqueness of the ownership. Eilers and Narus estimated that $2.3 billion in skins was used to bet on esports in 2015, $5 billion in 2016, and projected that over $20 billion in skins would be gambled by 2020 if the market was left unchecked. Of the $5 billion in skins during 2016, Eilers and Narus estimated that only $2 billion were used for esport betting, while the rest was used on traditional games of chance. Some individuals are estimated to have a cumulative worth of tens of millions of dollars of skins in their inventories. The effect of Global Offensive gambling is estimated by Esports Betting Report as an "eight figure" number that feeds the overall area of professional esports as the result of viewership and promotions related to the skin gambling.

Several factors led to concerns about the Global Offensive skins market and gambling. The skin gambling mechanisms work toward those predisposed to gambling because of the ready availability of, and ability to acquire, skins within the game, and can yield great rewards, according to UCLA's co-director of gambling studies, Timothy Wayne Fong. This is particularly true for younger players, who constitute a substantial portion of the Global Offensive player base, and who may also be encouraged through peer pressure to obtain unique skins to show off to their friends. According to a 2022 study, for young people aged 12-17, participating in esports activities was associated with engagement in esports betting. After controlling for recent monetary gambling, recent esports gamblers were over three times more likely to meet criteria for at-risk/problem gambling.

With the pressure applied to skin-gambling websites in 2016, some have moved to use skins as part of a cryptocurrency called "Skincoin", which was launched in June 2017. Skincoin, backed by Ethereum, allows users on the gambling websites to trade skins for Skincoin, which then can be used for gambling or purchasing skins. Other sites arose in 2017 that would allow users to obtain skins for doing "free" tasks, such as watching ads or advertising these sites through other games. These free skin sites do not have gambling aspects in order that they may appear legal, but users can subsequently take these skins into other gambling sites.

Due to more attention to issues like skin gambling and loot boxes coming under governmental regulations, the market activity of skin trading and gambling weakened by 2020. In 2023, Valve announced it would be releasing Counter-Strike 2, which led to newfound activity in the skin gambling market. One gun skin sold for more than $400,000 in April 2023.

=== Legal and regulatory actions ===
Governments and local regulators in several jurisdictions have investigated or taken action against weapon cases (loot boxes) and skin-based gambling systems associated with Valve games such as ‘‘Counter-Strike: Global Offensive’’ and its successor ‘‘Counter-Strike 2’’.

Legal scrutiny of loot boxes continued in the United States in the following years. In February 2026, New York Attorney General Letitia James filed a lawsuit against Valve, alleging that weapon case mechanics in ‘‘Counter-Strike 2’’, ‘’Dota 2’’, and ‘’Team Fortress 2’’ could constitute illegal gambling under New York law. Valve then disputed the allegations in a public response the following month.

In March 2026, a separate class-action lawsuit was filed in the United States District Court for the Western District of Washington by two players represented by the law firm Hagens Berman. The complaint stated that Valve’s loot box systems in games including ‘‘Counter-Strike 2’’ functioned as illegal gambling mechanisms and sought restitution of billions of dollars spent by players on case keys.

== Other games ==
While skin gambling and the issues relating to it has been limited mostly to Global Offensive, other games have also seen similar gambling using virtual goods. Valve's multiplayer online battle arena game Dota 2 uses cosmetic clothing and weapon replacements for the playable characters as virtual currency, which have been both traded and used for esports betting on the same sites as for Global Offensive or on similar sites. As drops of these costume elements are far rarer than in Global Offensive, gambling involving them was not seen as egregious as Global Offensive skin gambling, though this form of gambling does suffer from the same ethical and legal issues. Team Fortress 2's virtual goods are also used on various gambling sites, to a lesser extent.

Similar black markets and gambling sites exist for games in the FIFA series by Electronic Arts, starting with the FIFA Ultimate Team feature in FIFA 2013, in which players would use virtual coins, purchased with real-world funds, to create a team based on real-world FIFA players. Though players are able to trade virtual athletes with one another, the mechanisms involved have led to third-party gambling sites that operate on the same principle as does Global Offensive skin gambling. At least one such case against the sites that offer this type of gambling has been prosecuted.

Eve Online, a persistent massively multiplayer game that includes an in-game economy driven by players rather than by its developers, CCP Games, has had issues with virtual-item gambling that imbalanced the player-driver economy. Notably, in an event called "World War Bee" in 2016, numerous players worked with a player-bankrolled casino to acquire enough in-game wealth and assets to strip control from the reigning player faction in the game. Following the conflict, players from the affected faction noted potential legal issues with this in-game casino that would run afoul of European gambling laws if minors were involved, as well as how they affected the game's balance beyond what CCP had envisioned. CCP discovered that alongside these casinos there was also virtual-item gambling that involved real-world finances, practices that were against the game's terms of service. In October 2016, in anticipation of making Eve free-to-play, CCP altered its end-user license agreement terms to disallow any type of gambling using in-game assets, and later banned the accounts of those involved in the gambling scheme, effectively seizing in-game currency, estimated to be worth $620,000 in real monetary value.

== Issues and criticism ==
Skin gambling contributed greatly to the success of Global Offensive as an esport, but some argued that it needed to be regulated to avoid legal and ethical issues. Most of the discussion and action on skin gambling resulted from a video posted by YouTube user "HonorTheCall" in late June 2016. HonorTheCall had observed some allegations of questionable Global Offensive promotion through his Call of Duty videos, and, in searching in publicly available information, discovered evidence of unethical practice by one gambling site, which he documented in this video; subsequently, several media outlets took the initial evidence and reported more in-depth on the matter.

Skin-gambling sites have attracted a number of malicious users. When roulette-like websites were created, browser extensions claiming to automatically bet for the user were actually malware designed to steal skins and coins.

While gambling using virtual items is an acceptable practice under US case law, the fluidity between virtual goods and currency, enabled by the Steam Marketplace, makes it unclear whether skin gambling is legal under US law and if Valve would be liable. As of 2016, United States gambling laws, which include the Illegal Gambling Business Act (a component of the Organized Crime Control Act), the Unlawful Internet Gambling Enforcement Act of 2006, the Federal Wire Act, and the Professional and Amateur Sports Protection Act of 1992, do not explicitly cover the gambling of virtual goods in esports, though it may be argued that such laws could be easily modified to include virtual goods.

Further, the ease of accessibility of skin-gambling websites has enabled underage gambling. Justin Carlson, the creator of skin-selling online marketplace website SkinXchange, said underage gambling is a huge issue, and that there were "countless times" when he has called parents to tell them that their children had used their credit cards to buy items. Carlson cites cases in which underage users have bet hundreds or thousands of dollars, just to end up losing them on a betting or jackpot site.

Many skin-gambling sites do not explicitly declare their ownership and may be operated by offshore agencies, leading to issues involving transparency and promotion. Some of these sites are located in countries that do not have restrictions on gambling, putting them outside of law enforcement in some countries. In early July 2016, the video posted by HonorTheCall led to the discovery that one gambling website, CSGO Lotto, was owned by two YouTube users, Trevor "TmarTn" Martin and Tom "Syndicate" Cassell, and supported in equity by Josh "JoshOG" Beaver, none of whom disclosed this relationship in their videos while promoting the website to their subscribers, with some of this promotion paid through Global Offensive skins. This practice was identified as conflicting with Federal Trade Commission (FTC) regulations on promotional videos, though the owners have claimed they are operating within the law. Valve subsequently blocked CSGO Lotto from the Steam services, but a few days later overturned that ban. In September 2017, in what the FTC called its first settlement with "social media influencers", the FTC arranged an agreement with Martin and Cassell requiring them to disclose any business ties with their videos in the future or face more drastic action; this agreement was finalized in December 2017. The FTC also updated its guidelines in how product endorsement relates to social media in light of this situation. The lawyer representing Martin and Cassell said that CSGO Lotto should not be classified as a gambling site, as through its fine print, it allows users to participate without having skins by simply requesting entry tickets for its events, similar to the manner in which McDonald's Monopoly promotions are run.

A similar situation was discovered in relation to YouTube user PsiSyndicate (later called PsiSyn), who promoted the site SteamLoto without disclosure while being paid for the promotion in rare skins. The site CSGO Wild, in announcing its closure in response to Valve's cease-and-desist letters, revealed it had promoted members of FaZe Clan who had previously neglected to reveal this promotion in their videos. At least one member of FaZe Clan has since updated his video archives to include a message regarding the CSGO Wild promotion following this announcement.

There have been claims of match rigging between some skin-gambling sites and players. The site CS:GO Diamonds has admitted to providing at least one player with inside information to help make the resulting matches more exciting to draw viewers to the site. In January 2015, Valve banned seven professional Global Offensive players from the same team after finding evidence that they were match fixing in association with skin-gambling site CS:GO Lounge during a major competition. Valve warned that professional Global Offensive players and event organizers "should under no circumstances gamble on Global Offensive matches, associate with high volume Global Offensive gamblers, or deliver information to others that might influence their Global Offensive bets", threatening to exclude players who may even be suspected of such interactions. Despite this discovery, CS:GO Lounge continued to remain active, and later that year announced its sponsorship of a professional Global Offensive team, raising questions of its legitimacy.

== Government responses ==
On October 5, 2016, the Washington State Gambling Commission ordered the company to "immediately stop allowing the transfer" of skins for "gambling activities through the company's Steam Platform", giving the company until October 14 to submit notice of compliance or otherwise face legal repercussions, which may include criminal charges. The commission had previously contacted Valve in February over issues with the practice, specifically focused on issues relating to the use of the Steam API that enabled the third-party websites. Valve's reply re-asserted it was not involved with these gambling sites and did nothing wrong under state law, further asserting that most of the Steam service features used by the gambling sites are primarily designed to be used to facilitate legal and acceptable practices for other users, and thus cannot directly shut down these services without impacting the bulk of other Steam accounts using the services legally. Valve continued it had offered to cooperate with the state to identify those Steam accounts being used for gambling sites and shut them down for violation of its end-user license agreement terms, and would continue to do so. The Federal Trade Commission is evaluating whether some of the Global Offensive players that have promoted these gambling sites have violated appropriate disclosure rules, however, the commission has not yet issued a formal statement regarding their investigation.

In 2016, Australian senator Nick Xenophon planned to introduce legislation that would classify games like Global Offensive, Dota 2, and other games with virtual economies with the option to use real currency to buy items with random or different value (as in the Global Offensive weapon cases) as games of chance. Under this proposed law, such games would be regulated under gambling laws, requiring them to carry clear warning labels and to enforce age requirements to play. Xenophon stated that these games "purport to be one thing" but are "morphing into full-on gambling and that itself is incredibly misleading and deceptive." The Norwegian Gambling Authority, which oversees all gambling operations within Norway, deemed skin gambling of any form to be illegal in March 2017, and will take action against operators of skin-gambling websites within the country.

The government of the Isle of Man enacted licensing conditions in February 2017 permitting online-gambling operators to allow players to deposit, gamble with and withdraw virtual items such as skins. This is performed under strict regulation to ensure that all gambling is done using certified random number generators (RNGs) and that no minors participate. This was seen as potentially restoring the skin-gambling market after the 2016 incidents. In August 2017, the United Kingdom's Gambling Commission opened an investigation into skin gambling. The commission has successfully prosecuted two owners of a UK website that promoted virtual-goods gambling related to FIFA games on charges of advertising unlawful gambling and encouraging underage gambling. The commission published its report in December 2017, finding that 11% of 11-to-16-year-old children in the UK had participated in skin gambling, in part as the result of the lack of safeguards against underage use on skin-gambling sites. The commission announced that it is prepared to take criminal action, but that is needs the assistance of parents and game companies to enforce underage-gambling rules.

In February 2018, the Danish government blocked access to six skin-gambling sites following a court case between the Danish Gambling Authority and two Danish telecommunication companies. The court ruled that since the skin-betting sites were promoted at a site in the Danish language, they were required to have permission from the Danish Gambling Authority. The telecommunication companies had initially refused to comply with the demand by the Danish Gambling Authority to block access to the sites on grounds of principle, which led to the case going to court. The same court case also outlawed 18 other gambling sites not involved with skin gambling.

With concerns over loot boxes in late 2017, the Dutch Gaming Authority reviewed several games containing loot box mechanics. In April 2018 the regulator determined that some of these systems violated Dutch gambling law because the items obtained could be traded outside the game and therefore had real-world value. The authority issued letters to publishers of several unnamed games giving them eight weeks to modify or remove the offending systems or face fines or criminal charges.

On the June 20, 2018 compliance deadline, Valve disabled Global Offensive and Dota 2 item trading and access to the Steam Community Market for users within the Netherlands in response to the regulator's ruling, stating at the time that it did not understand or agree with the decision but had contacted the authority for clarification.

Belgium issued a similar ruling shortly afterward. The Belgian Gaming Commission concluded that several games, including Counter-Strike: Global Offensive, Overwatch, and FIFA 18, contained loot box mechanics that violated Belgian gambling law. Unlike the Netherlands, Belgium did not set a specific deadline for compliance, but developers were expected to alter or remove the systems in order to comply with the law.

At the Gambling Regulators European Forum conference in September 2018, members from 15 European nations, as well as the American state of Washington, announced a collaborative effort to address the "risks created by the blurring of lines between gaming and gambling", with the primary focus to be on third-party websites that offer skin-gambling features.

== Legal actions ==
=== Lawsuits ===
In June 2016, Valve was sued in the State of Connecticut by resident Michael John McLeod. The lawsuit cites "illegal gambling" issues "knowingly" created by Valve and three of the trading sites, CSGO Diamonds, CSGO Lounge and OPSkins, including potential gambling by minors, stating that Valve not only provides the currency in the form of skins for gambling, but also profits from the resulting trades when such skins are won. McLeod's lawyers are seeking to treat this as a class-action lawsuit once proceedings begin.

A second lawsuit, also filed as a class-action, was initiated against Valve, Martin, Cassel, and CSGO Lotto by a Florida mother in July 2016 shortly after the CSGO Lotto discovery. This suit states that Valve enables gambling by minors and users such as Martin and Cassel promote this, all considered illegal activities under federal racketeering laws and Florida consumer protection laws. ESPN outlined the story of Elijah Ballard, one of the 44 plaintiffs in the case, who had become addicted to skins gambling when he was twelve years old, using his parents' credit cards and bank accounts to purchase skins.

Jasper Ward, a lead counsel in both cases, undertook the lawsuits due to his current involvement in the legal investigation into gambling issues with DraftKings and FanDuel, sites that allowed players to bet on fantasy teams. Ward stated that Valve "created and is profiting from an online gambling ecosystem that, because it is illegal and unregulated, harms consumers, many of whom are teenagers". Ward noted that, as of a July 6, 2016 interview, Valve had not issued a response to either case, and believed that the company's "public silence [...] is unconscionable", particularly in light of them unbanning CSGO Lotto.

Part of both suits asserted there were Racketeer Influenced and Corrupt Organizations Act (RICO) violations at play, requiring part of the suit to be heard at the Federal Circuit Court. The presiding judge in the first case ruled in favor of the defendants' motion to vacate this aspect of the case in October 2016, stating that "gambling losses are not sufficient injury to business or property for RICO standing". Valve successfully lobbied to transfer the case to a federal court in Seattle in August 2016, and subsequently had the case dismissed on juridical grounds in November. The plaintiffs attempted to refile in King County Superior Court in Seattle, but Valve also lobbied this to federal court and similarly received juridical dismissal. The plaintiffs were joined by additional plaintiffs in Washington and Illinois and filed in federal court in Seattle; the new filing includes the actions of the Washington State Gambling Commission as part of its assertions. Similarly, the second case against CSGO Lotto was kicked out of federal courts on the same RICO arguments, and was refiled in Florida state courts where CSGO Lotto was incorporated. Ward noted that Martin had moved out of the United States to the United Kingdom around the time the lawsuits had been filed, making it difficult to see any legal action towards him. A final claim of the suit, related to Valve deceiving the parents under Washington's Consumer Protection Act, was dismissed with prejudice in January 2022, as the judge ruled that the parents themselves, having never played the game, lacked standing to bring such charges.

In April 2019, the Quinault Indian Nation in Washington state filed a lawsuit against Valve, alleging that despite their steps to prevent gambling using skins, continues to run Global Offensive with the intent to profit from skin gambling, making them run afoul as an unlicensed gambling business, and because of its size, gains a significant advantage over the licensed gambling that the Quinault have.

New York state attorney general Letitia James filed suit against Valve in February 2026 over the loot boxes in TF2, CS2, and DOTA, asserting that the loot boxes from these games and skin gambling from its contents violate the state' s gambling laws as well as exploit younger users on the service. A similar class action lawsuit was filed in the U.S. against Valve in March 2026.

=== Reactions by Valve and others ===
Shortly after the second lawsuit above, Valve's Erik Johnson stated in a July 13, 2016, letter to Gamasutra that they will demand the third-party sites that use Steam functionality to aid in gambling to cease their use of Steam in that manner, as their methods of connectivity and use go against Steam's acceptable use policy. Johnson also stated that Valve has no business relationships with these sites, and will pursue legal action if they continue to violate their service terms. On July 20, 2016, Valve followed by issuing several cease and desist letters to 23 sites they believed involved in skin gambling that were inappropriately using their services, giving them ten days to discontinue use of the Steamworks API. Another 20 sites were issued similar cease and desist notices by Valve a week later.

The same month, Twitch warned its users that streams depicting or promoting Global Offensive gambling sites were in violation of its terms of service, which forbids streams that depict content which violates the terms of service of third-parties. As a result, Twitch banned James Varga, also known as "PhantomL0rd", the highest-viewed Global Offensive player on Twitch with over 1.4 million followers at the time, asserting the ban was for violating their terms of service, though did not clarify further for the specific reasons. This ban had followed a few days after yet-proven allegations regarding Varga's connections to a skin gambling site were made public. Shortly after, Varga announced that he had obtained legal counsel to fight his Twitch ban, and filing a formal lawsuit against Twitch for it in February 2018, seeking monetary damages due to having his streaming career impacted by the ban. Twitch filed a countersuit in May 2018, arguing that Varga violated terms and conditions of using the site, and seeks compensatory damages for harm that Varga had created for Twitch and its users. Varga won the lawsuit in April 2021, the ruling stating that Twitch did not follow its stated process in warning Varga about his content, and was awarded about $20,000 related to lost revenues, though would still not be able to return to Twitch.

In the wake of Valve's statement, several of the gambling sites either went dark, closed off the use of the site by United States residents, or formally announced their closure, such as CSGODouble. Valve warned users that they should move any skins they have transferred to such sites back to their Steam inventory, while several affected sites have promised users they will automatically return skins in the near future. One site, OPSkins, remained active, saying in a statement that they were not a gambling site and do not anticipate Valve would take action against them as a result. CSGO Lounge had announced plans to obtain legal gambling licenses in the countries it plans to operate within, and restricting access to users from countries with these licenses. However, the site announced the following month that they were shutting down all virtual item gambling, offering users an opportunity to recover their virtual items, while shifting to a general esports entertainment website. By January 2017, only about half of these sites contacted by Valve had been shut down, with more off-shore sites being set up around the time. Further, the newer skin gambling sites have kept low profiles, making skin gambling more of an underground economy that is more difficult to track. Around the same time, Valve announced that they were going to take similar action to block sites and accounts that engaged in gambling using Team Fortress 2 items.

In March 2018, Valve extended its Steam storefront policy of a seven-day cooling off period on newly acquired items from trades to apply to Global Offensive skins; this was done purposely to target skin gambling and trading sites which depend on the immediacy of being able to trade items, without disrupting fair trades between players. This was met with criticism from players, particularly those that have run legitimate community trading sites and streamers that offer skins for viewers, and a petition with over 100,000 signatures had been started to have Valve review this decision. Shortly afterwards, OPSkins had launched ExpressTrade, a site that used bots to automate some of the trading functions as to effectively bypass the seven-day period. Valve sent a cease & desist letter to OPSkins demanding they shut down ExpressTrade for violating Steam's Terms of Service, and subsequently, when OPSkins failed to act, deactivated the accounts of the bots used by ExpressTrade. Users from Reddit estimated that over US$2 million worth of skins were lost from this shutdown, which included about $1 million in PlayerUnknown's Battlegrounds skins that had been locked in the system when the PUBG Corp, which publishes the game, opted to lock skin trading when they saw their skins being used in skin gambling.

Valve has had to take other steps to limit the use of Steam's features to advertise skin gambling sites. After it was found that these gambling sites were creating simple mods for users to download via the Steam Workshop feature for CS:GO and other games primarily as a means of promoting their sites, Valve instituted Workshop moderation for these games, requiring human review of the content and denying those that were not appropriate. Similarly, some sites have taken to Steam's review feature on other games; a review is written which primarily serves to promote a skin gambling site, and then various bot-enabled accounts rapidly vote that review up, which not only highlights the site advertisement, but elevates the game's presence in Steam so that the review will more likely be seen. When detected, Valve has removed such reviews as well. In October 2019, Valve removed the ability for CS:GO container keys to traded or resold and tying purchased keys to the buyer's account, as they had found that nearly all such container keys were being used to support the grey market of skin gambling and real-world money laundering.

In May 2023, Valve added "commercial practices" including gambling to their prohibited practices in the Steam code of conduct. The following month, bans were issued to more than 40 high-profile steam accounts involved in supplying skins to various gambling sites. This resulted in over $2 million being locked to individuals accounts.

== Impact ==
The revelations of several problems with skin gambling during June and July 2016 highlighted the nature of gambling as a significant problem for esports. Todd Harris of Hi-Rez Studios, a developer of several esports games, believed that these events signaled the end of an era where esports went mostly unregulated, requiring publishers and tournament operators to exert tighter control on their games to reduce gambling problems. Psyonix, the developers of Rocket League, announced plans to bring a similar loot-drop and trading system to their game as with Global Offensive, but purposely opted not to use the Steamworks API to manage player inventory, seeking to avoid a similar situation with gambling that happened with Global Offensive. Brendan Greene, lead designer for PlayerUnknown's Battlegrounds, believed that by mid-2017, Valve had put enough safeguards in place to use the Steam marketplace to manage the trading and selling of cosmetic items for Battlegrounds without worrying about skin gambling. However, by November 2017, several Battlegrounds skin gambling sites of questionable legality began to appear. PUBG Corp, the developers behind Battlegrounds, disabled Steam trading in May 2018 as they found players were still abusing the system.

As there is still a desire to gamble on esports, programs are being developed to use completely virtual currencies that have no monetary value to avoid the skin gambling issues. For example, in September 2016, Twitch announced plans to offer a virtual currency, known as "Stream+", to users of their platform which would as act as points within a loyalty program. The points can be earned by watching streams, and a user would be able to bet on esport matches with them.

When the existence of the skin gambling situation was discovered in mid-2016, estimates for the economics of skin gambling market had dropped, but by early 2017, these analysts found the market did not drop as much as they expected, and with gambling sites still open and growing, they do not expect to see this diminish in the near future unless the legal matters are resolved. Analysis firm Naruscope estimated in early 2017 that even with increased awareness of the legal ramifications of skin gambling, there could be as much as $12.9 billion gambled this way by 2020, compared to their previous estimate of $20 billion made in mid-2016. Grove places much of the future of skin gambling on Valve and its control over the Steam API that enables the third-party websites; Valve had stated that changing the API to cut off these websites would also affect other legal activities that could be performed with it, making it difficult to enforce without more direct oversight and monitoring by Valve. It is unclear if the two lawsuits against Valve will come to a full trial, and thus attention is being placed on the Washington State Gambling Commission's pending actions to resolve the situation.
