= Loot box =

Purchasable video game item containing random rewards

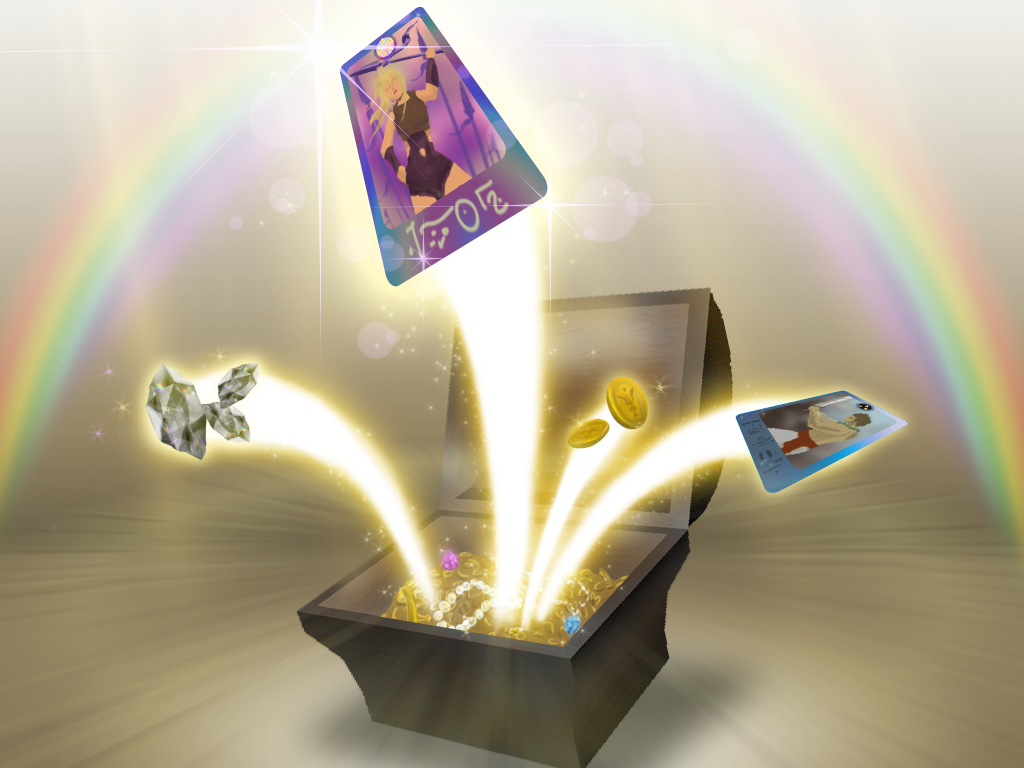
Mock-up image of opening a loot box in a video game

In video games, a loot box (also called a loot crate or prize crate) is a consumable virtual item which can be redeemed to receive a randomised selection of further virtual items, or loot, ranging from cosmetic customisation options for a player's avatar or character to game-changing equipment such as weapons and armour. A loot box is typically a form of monetization, with players either buying the boxes directly or receiving the boxes during play and later buying "keys" with which to redeem them. These systems are considered similar to gacha (based on gashapon, i.e. capsule toys), which is popular in Japan, and may be integrated into gacha games.

Loot box concepts originated from loot systems in massively multiplayer online role-playing games, and from the monetisation of free-to-play mobile gaming. They first appeared in 2004 through 2007, and have appeared in many free-to-play games and in some full-priced titles since then. They are seen by developers and publishers of video games not only to help generate ongoing revenue for games while avoiding drawbacks of paid downloadable content or game subscriptions, but to also keep player interest within games by offering new content and cosmetics through loot-box reward systems. Loot boxes are just one form of chance-based mechanism used in paid reward systems within some digital games, and research has explored their impact on children, youth and families, and the boundaries between gaming and gambling.

Loot boxes were popularised through their inclusion in several games throughout the mid-2010s. By the latter half of the decade, some games, particularly Star Wars Battlefront II, expanded approaches to the concept that caused them to become highly criticised. Such criticism included "pay to win" gameplay systems that favoured those that spent real money on loot boxes and negative effects on gameplay systems to accommodate them, as well as them being anti-consumer when implemented in full-priced games. Due to fears of them being used as a source in gray-market skin gambling, loot boxes began to become regulated under national gambling laws in various countries at the same time. Due to the legal concerns over loot boxes, many game developers switched to other mechanisms for monetization, such as battle passes.

== Design ==
A "loot box" can be named several different ways, usually related to the type of game that it appears in. A "loot box", "loot crate" or "lockbox" is often applied to shooter games since one obtains new equipable outfits or gear from it. Digital card games may use the term "booster pack" following from collectible card game roots.

Loot boxes are often given to players during play, for instance as rewards for leveling up their character or completing a multiplayer game without quitting. Loot boxes may also be given out through promotions outside of gameplay, such as watching certain streaming events. Players can also buy them directly, most often with real-world funds but also through in-game currency (sometimes, in-game currency can or has to be paid for with real-world funds to obtain lootboxes). Some loot boxes can be redeemed immediately, while redeeming others requires further consumable items dressed as "keys".

Loot boxes are generally redeemed through an in-game interface which dresses the process with appealing visual and audio effects. Some such interfaces are similar to those of slot machines or roulette wheels, and designed to create a psychological response to increase player excitement. When the player runs out of loot boxes or keys, a prominent button may be displayed with which they can buy more.

The items that can be granted by a loot box are usually graded by "rarity", with the probability of receiving an item decreasing rapidly with each grade. While the set of items given are randomly selected it can come with certain guarantees, for instance that it will contain at least one item of a certain rarity or above. In some redemption processes, yet-revealed items are presented with a colour that corresponds to its rarity level, further heightening the excitement of revealing the items. Some game systems include a "pity-timer" mechanic, which increases the player's chances to receive a rarer item from a loot box if the player has not received one in the last several loot boxes they have opened. This pity-timer mechanic may also be used if the player purchases loot boxes in bulk rather than individually, such that one of the loot boxes in the bulk purchase is assured of having a rarer item.

The player's inventory is managed in server databases run by the game's developers or publishers. This may allow for players to view the inventory of other players and arrange for trades with them. Items obtained from loot boxes and equipped or used by the player's character are nearly always visible to all other players during the course of a game, such as seeing a character skin or hearing a voice line.

Most loot-box systems grant items without regard for what the player already owns. Means are usually provided to dispose of these duplicates, often involving trading them with other players or converting them into an in-game currency. Some loot-box systems allow players to then use this currency to directly purchase specific items they do not have.

Some loot-box systems, primarily from Asian developers, use an approach adapted from gashapon (capsule toy) vending machines. These gacha games offer "spins" (analogous to turning the crank of a capsule machine) to get a random item, character, or other virtual good. One form of gacha called "complete gacha" allows players to combine common items in a set in order to form a rarer item. The first few items in a set can be rapidly acquired but as the number of missing items decreases it becomes increasingly unlikely that redeeming a loot box will complete the set. This is particularly true if there are a large number of common items in the game, since eventually one single, specific item is required. This particular practice was banned in Japan by the Consumer Affairs Agency in 2012, though gacha games at large remain.

Some games may include seasonal or special event loot boxes which include specific items only available during the time of that event. In the case of digital collectible card games which rotate expansions in and out as part of keeping a viable meta-game, booster packs of a certain expansion may only be purchasable while that expansion is considered in standard play, and once it is "retired", these cards can no longer be earned in packs, though still may be gained from the use of in-game currency and used outside standard play.

== History ==
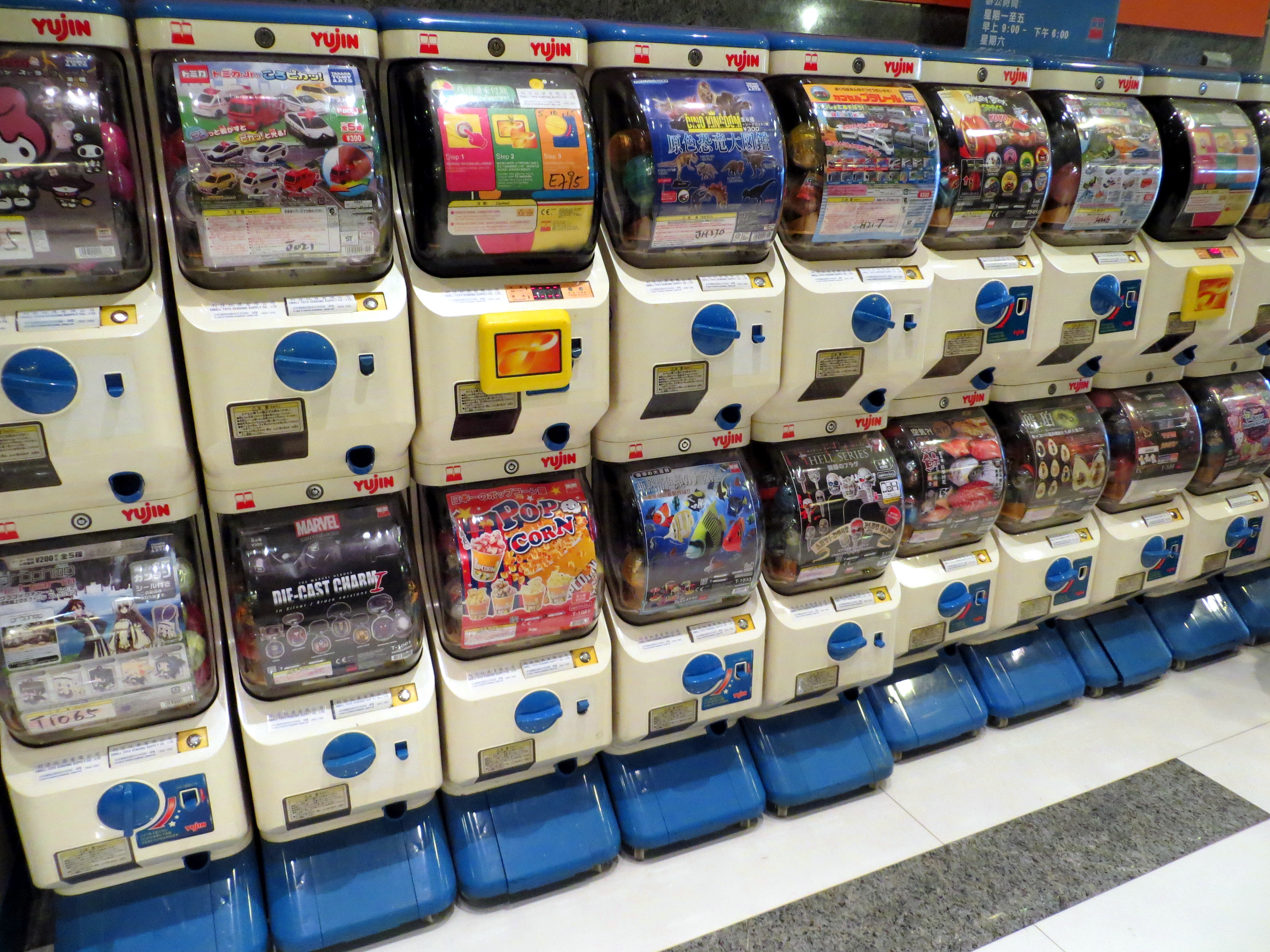
An array of gachapon (capsule toy) machines in Hong Kong. Loot boxes were inspired by the random distribution of gachapon one could acquire through these machines.

Loot boxes are an extension of randomised loot drop systems from earlier video games, frequently used to give out randomised rewards in massively multiplayer online role-playing games (MMO or MMORPG) or similar games. Loot boxes took this approach and formulated a monetisation approach used by free-to-play games in mobile gaming. Loot boxes also incorporate elements of the randomness of acquiring gachapon capsule toys.

The first known instance of a loot-box system is an item called "gachapon ticket", introduced in June 2004 in the Japanese version of MapleStory. The tickets were sold at the price of ¥100 each. Like real-life gachapon machines, players attained random game items when they used the ticket on "Gachapon", in-game machines distributed across the game world.

The Chinese free-to-play game ZT Online (or simply Zhengtu) which was released in 2007 by the Zhengtu Network is also considered to be one of the early examples of video games that contained loot boxes as a part of its game system. Players in Asian countries typically do not have the funds to purchase full-cost titles, and use Internet cafes or PC bangs to play the game for free, or resort to online piracy to obtain copies of games for free. Instead of trying to change this approach, Asian games like ZT Online introduced loot boxes as a means to assure monetisation from a game that they would otherwise not receive revenue from the base sale.

Within a year, Zhengtu Network reported monthly revenue from ZT Online exceeding US$15 million, justifying the profitability of this scheme. This led to the approach of releasing games as free-to-play with microtransactions atop the title. Many free-to-play mobile games in Asian regions would offer loot-box approaches, most notably Puzzle & Dragons, released in 2011, which used its gacha approach to be the first mobile game to earn more than US$1 billion from its monetisation scheme.

In Western regions (North America and Europe) around 2009, the video game industry saw the success of Zynga and other large publishers of social-network games that offered the games for free on sites like Facebook but included microtransactions to accelerate one's progress in the game, providing that publishers could depend on revenue from post-sale transactions rather than initial sale. One of the first games to introduce loot box-like mechanics was FIFA 09, made by Electronic Arts (EA), in March 2009 which allowed players to create a team of association football players from in-game card packs they opened using in-game currency earned through regular playing of the game or via microtransactions.

Another early game with loot box mechanics was Team Fortress 2 in September 2010, when Valve added the ability to earn random "crates" to be opened with purchased keys. Valve's Robin Walker stated that the intent was to create "network effects" that would draw more players to the game, so that there would be more players to obtain revenue from the keys to unlock crates. Valve later transitioned to a free-to-play model, reporting an increase in player count of over 12 times after the transition, and hired Yanis Varoufakis to research virtual economies. Over the next few years many MMOs and multiplayer online battle arena games (MOBAs) also transitioned to a free-to-play business model to help grow out their player base, many adding loot-box monetisation in the process, with the first two being both Star Trek Online and The Lord of the Rings Online in December 2011.

Separately, the FIFA series included a "FIFA Ultimate Team Mode" that allowed players to use virtual trading cards to build a team. Initially released as downloadable content (DLC), the "FIFA Ultimate Team Mode" transitioned to a free add-on to the base game with the 2010 release, with the ability to buy card packs as a means to generate revenue for the game. EA took the success of this transition for Mass Effect 3 in March 2012. Mass Effect 3 offered "packs" that would offer uncommon gear, otherwise obtainable only by "grinding" through online gameplay. According to the game's producer Jesse Houston, these were used as a means to offset the development cost of the game's multiplayer mode. The Mass Effect 3 team worked closely with the FIFA team to get the rollout of these packs right, which Houston compared to opening a Magic: The Gathering booster card pack to make a player feel like they were always getting value from the pack.

Other early examples of packaged games with loot boxes included Counter-Strike: Global Offensive in August 2013, adding "weapon cases" in an update, and Battlefield 4 in October 2013, adding "battlepacks", though they did not become purchasable until May 2014 and never granted duplicate items. Call of Duty: Advanced Warfare, released in November 2014, included "supply drops" that contained randomised items including different variants of the game's weapons, character gear, and experience points that could be used to customise one's character.

With the financial success of Overwatch and its loot-box systems, several games—particularly from popular franchises—in 2016 and 2017 included the mechanic as part of its meta-game. This included Call of Duty: WWII, Halo Wars 2, Gears of War 4, Assassin's Creed Origins, Middle-earth: Shadow of War, and Forza Motorsport 7. By October 2017, this had led to critical review of the practice. In particular, the highly visible Star Wars Battlefront II, released amid criticism of its loot-box systems in November 2017, led to renewed discussions at various government levels related to the legality of these systems. The review aggregator OpenCritic announced plans to include a "business model intrusiveness" for games that provide a metric on how much a game's loot and DLC system can impact the game. The reaction to loot boxes in the last half of 2017 was considered one of the major trends in the video game industry in 2017.

== Criticism ==
=== Player expenditures and gambling concerns ===
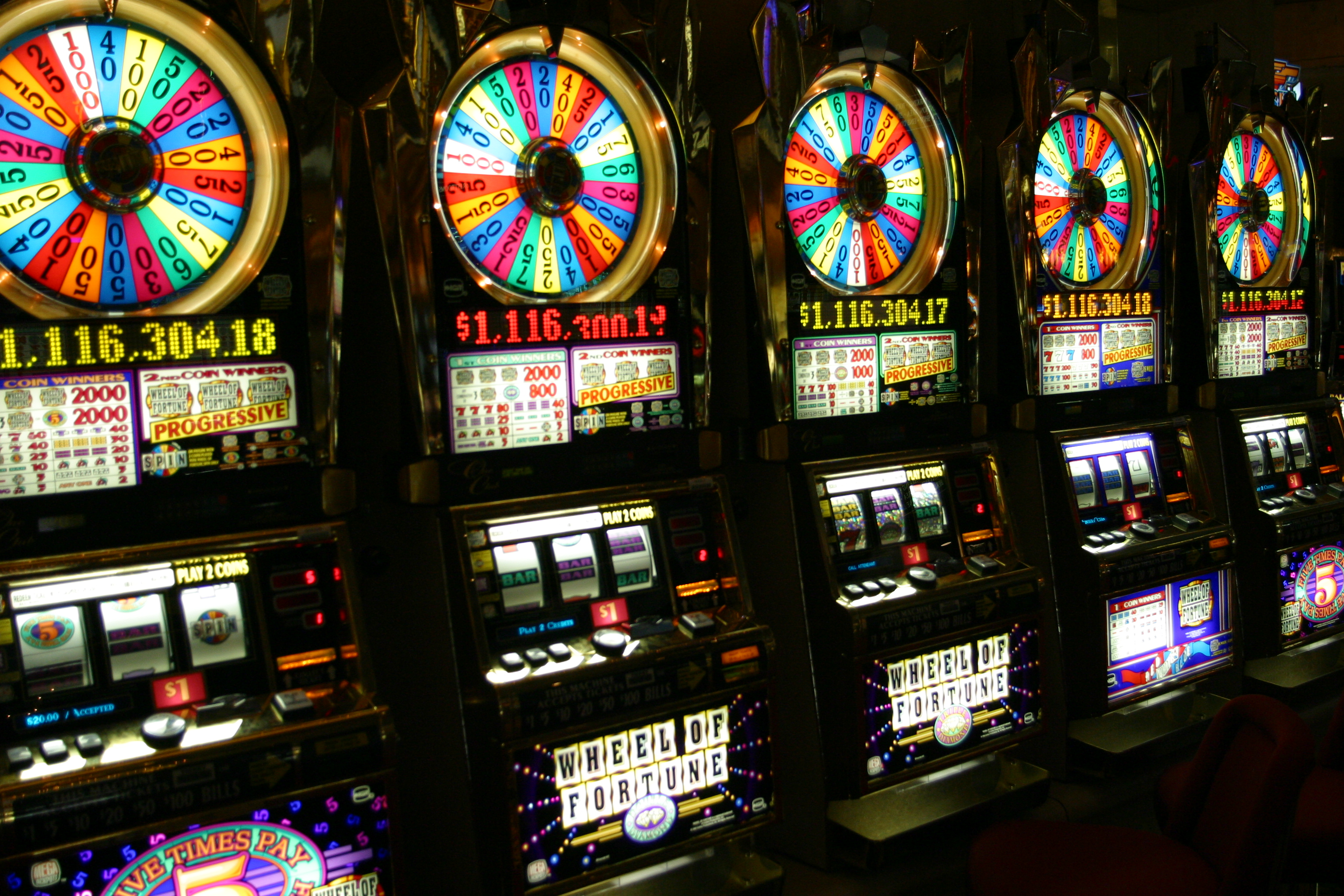
A row of slot machines in a legal casino. Various independent studies concluded or suggested that the mechanisms of loot boxes in video games share many crucial similarities with traditional slot machines in casino.

Loot boxes are considered part of the compulsion loop of game design to keep players invested in a game. Such compulsion loops are known to contribute towards video game addiction and are frequently compared to gambling addiction. This is in part due to the use of a "variable-ratio reinforcement schedule" similar to how slot machines dole out prizes. While many players may never spend real-world money in a loot-box system, such addictive systems can bring large monetary expenditures from "whales", players who are willing to spend large amounts of money on virtual items.

A meta-analysis of 15 studies found that lootbox spending and problem gambling symptomology were moderately positively correlated. Gambling concerns are heightened in games that offer loot boxes and are known to be played by children. Loot boxes also feed into the social anxiety around the "fear of missing out" (FOMO), as some random drops from loot boxes may be available for only a limited time, and players will be more inclined to spend money to obtain loot boxes so they do not miss out on these items. The use of pity-timers in loot box redemption also can feed into the gambler's fallacy, appearing to give credence to the player that they will be assured of a high-rarity item if they open enough loot boxes.

Video games have generally been considered games of skill rather than games of chance and thus are unregulated under most gambling laws, but researchers from New Zealand and Australia, writing in Nature Human Behaviour in 2018, concluded that "loot boxes are psychologically akin to gambling". A separate report from researchers in England in 2021 also concluded that loot boxes "are structurally and psychologically akin to gambling".

Proponents for the use of loot boxes have countered complaints that they are gambling systems by likening them to opening collectible toys such as Hatchimals or booster packs from physical collectible card games (CCGs) like Magic: The Gathering. In the United States CCGs have been subject to previous legal challenges related to if they are a form of gambling, but were not found liable. Some countries like Belgium have specifically exempted CCGs from gambling legislation because these games do not offer any type of gambling element. However, opponents of loot boxes address the fact that the process of opening a digital loot box is designed around a sensory experience and immediate return that can affect those that may be prone to gambling, a factor that does not exist with physical booster packs.

Some have argued the increased use of loot boxes in games since FIFA was due to the perception that the act of opening loot boxes is an exciting element for a game for both the player, and those watching the player either on YouTube videos or through live streaming, creating a number of multi-million subscriber video streams solely dedicated to opening loot boxes. NPD Group, which tracks video game sales, says that for games released through September 2017, there was no sign of consumer purchase change, positively or negatively, on games that included loot boxes.

NPD reported that NBA 2K18, which had been criticised by players for its loot-box system at its September 2017 launch, ended up as the best-selling game in North America for that month. Juniper Research estimated that the global video game market, worth around US$117 billion in 2017, is set to grow to about US$160 billion by 2022, buoyed by the increased use of loot boxes, particularly within China. For these reason, some developers see loot boxes as an essential means to monetise games, knowing that there will always be players willing to buy these even if most others do not.

Games with randomised in-game rewards, including those from loot boxes, and which offer the means to trade these items with other players, are known to attract the use of skin gambling. In skin gambling, these customization items, "skins", become a black market virtual currency among players and operators of websites that allow players to trade the items for real-world funds, or to use those items to gamble on esports or other games of chance; subsequently these activities have been identified as gambling by legal authorities, and several legal challenges arose in the last half of 2016 to stop this practice. Valve's Counter-Strike: Global Offensive, updated in 2013 to include randomised loot drops from in-games, has been the most visible example of skin gambling by mid-2016. Several games which followed in 2016 and onward that used loot boxes or other randomised rewards, including Rocket League and PlayerUnknown's Battlegrounds, did not include the ability to trade items or placed limits on trades, thus eliminating skin gambling from these games.

The similarities between the loot box systems and gambling mechanics have been studied in academic literature. There have been positive studies on the relationship between loot box spending and problem gambling severity, especially in adolescents and young adults., which are based on research designs of randomized reward schedules, variable ratio schedules, and audiovisual feedback mechanisms, which are reminiscent of slot machine design.

Other researchers maintain that the psychology behind playing loot boxes can be responsible of risk-taking behaviour, especially when the benefits of playing a game are monetary and the barriers to entering the game are low. Nonetheless, other researchers warn that not all correlations may result in causation. Certain studies have posited that people prone to gambling in the first place are more inclined to expend on loot boxes, which is not caused by loot boxes.

Critics have argued that many loot box systems rely on "dark patterns", a term used in behavioral economics and user‑experience research to describe design techniques that intentionally manipulate player behavior. These include time‑limited offers that create artificial urgency, reward streaks that encourage continued spending, and interface layouts that obscure the true cost of purchases. Some games also use progressive reward systems that increase the perceived value of opening additional loot boxes, even when the statistical odds remain unchanged. Researchers have noted that these design strategies can exploit cognitive biases such as loss aversion, sunk‑cost fallacy, and reward anticipation, making it difficult for players—particularly younger audiences—to make rational spending decisions. As a result, dark patterns have become a central focus of ethical debates surrounding modern game monetization.

=== Impact on game design ===
Some loot-box systems within free games are criticised as "pay-to-win" systems, and may be derogatorily referred to as "pay-to-loot". In these cases, the contents of the loot box contain items, beyond superficial customization options, which directly affect gameplay, such as booster packs for a digital collectible card game, and with the impact on gameplay proportional to the item's rarity. This can tie the quality of a player's ability to compete with others to the random generation systems of the loot pack, and may drive players into paying for additional loot boxes to obtain high-rarity items to fairly compete with others. Blizzard's digital card game Hearthstone, released in 2014, is frequently considered to require financial expenditure in booster packs to be a successful player. Blizzard claims that it attempts to minimize the effect of pay-to-win in Hearthstone, by implementing a gameplay mode which only allows players to use cards from a "core set" and from expansions released in the prior two years.

Some commentators expressed concern that for these types of loot-box models to be successful for the publishers, the game itself has to be designed around promoting and encouraging the player to purchase loot boxes, which fundamentally impacts core game design principles and may weaken the underlying game mechanics. This may include the use of loot boxes as a means to bypass the need to grind missions repeatedly to get gameplay-changing items that significantly help towards completing a single-player game, which drives players to use real money to purchase these to avoid the time sink. For example, Middle-earth: Shadow of War has a second, true ending requiring the player to gain many more stronger allies to meet its higher difficulty.

While the developers playtested the balance of the game without the loot-box system activated, assuring the game could be completed without additional monetisation, reviewers found that the game required a great deal of time needed to complete numerous additional missions for the chance to acquire stronger allies, and with the consistent presence of the in-game market for loot boxes, made it difficult to avoid the allure of paying real money to bypass this grinding, creating a negative on the overall experience. The presentation of a storefront within a game which allows one to use real-world funds to purchase loot boxes or other equipment can also impact the sense of immersion a player has with a game. By July 2018, the developers of Shadow of War had released patches that completely removed the in-game storefront and loot-box system.

=== Incentives for monetisation ===
The implementation of some loot-box systems are considered anti-consumer by some players and commentators. Full-priced games which already provide downloadable content and then include a loot-box system have been heavily criticised by players. Some gaming journalists identify the inclusion of loot boxes in multiplayer games as a justified part of the publisher's cost for maintaining the game servers, but see their use in single-player games as only a means for the publishers to profit.

Developers and publishers consider loot boxes part of a necessary process of monetising AAA video games beyond their initial sale. Publishers have been hesitant of raising the base price of AAA games beyond US$60 (as of 2017) for fear of immediately losing sales, and instead seek post-release revenue streams to cover the increased costs and pace of the development process, the stagnation in growth in video game audiences, and a shortening window of time in which to gain full-price sales of their games after release. Monetisation schemes like loot boxes can help provide long tail revenue, well after the release of the game. Post-release monetisation is believed by publishers to be necessary to compete with the mobile gaming sector, which predominantly uses free-to-play monetisation schemes. An analyst for KeyBanc Capital Markets, in the wake of the Star Wars Battlefront II controversy, said that the price of video games, even with added purchases for loot boxes and micro-transactions, remains lower than other forms of media on a per-hour basis, and that games are generally underpriced for what value they give.

Developers noted that the decision to include loot boxes in a game, and how they will be priced in real-world funds, may come from their publisher or upper management, but the implementation of their mechanics, including what they include, how they are doled out, and the like, are frequently set by the developers themselves. Some developers argue that the loot-box approach can mesh well with certain types of games, as long as they are not implemented to be a predatory manner towards consumers, and the decision to implement loot boxes within a game may be chosen by the developers rather than a mandate from the publisher. When the loot-box systems are used principally as a means to gain post-sales revenues rather than as an incentive to continuing playing the game, developers feel this requires them to significantly alter the game design away from challenge in gameplay and onto getting players to spend money. They found that games where the baseline gameplay does not encourage or require spending money for loot boxes, the addition of new content obtained from loot boxes is generally celebrated within that community and may gain brief revenue from that. Further, loot-box systems are generally better handled when their use is determined early in development so the developers can design around it, rather than a last-minute addition. Developers found that the mechanics of loot boxes are more accepted by non-Western audiences and younger Western audiences, where these groups have developed different consumption patterns than older Western players, particularly as a result of growing up playing free-to-play mobile titles.

=== Specific examples ===
==== Overwatch ====
Blizzard Entertainment's Overwatch's loot box implementation does not impact gameplay, but other aspects of the system are subject to criticism. A free crate is given to the player each time the player reaches enough experience to level-up, but the rate of experience acquisition varies with player skill. While any item contains only cosmetic appeal and has no influence on gameplay, the desire for a specific item creates a strong incentive to purchase additional crates.

Overwatch's producer Jeff Kaplan detailed the desire to create an in-game currency allowing players to directly acquire an item independent of luck or skill, but currency is only given to a player after opening a crate. Overwatch's software-as-a-service model delivers continued revenue as Blizzard adds new items to obtain through loot boxes. In response to criticism, Blizzard has made adjustments to its loot box system; for example, reducing the frequency of obtaining duplicate items from loot boxes while attempting to maintain the same in-game currency earning rate in June 2017.

Blizzard's CEO Mike Morhaime said that with Overwatch's loot boxes, Blizzard avoided inclusion of pay-to-win, gameplay-changing elements and the ability to convert rewards from loot boxes back into real-world money, and thus "don't think Overwatch belongs in that [loot box] controversy". Industry analyst Michael Pachter speculated that the loot box model of Overwatch that uses only cosmetic items will become the more preferred method of offering this monetisation in the future. Despite this, Overwatch's system still does not allow players to directly use real-world funds to purchase a specific cosmetic item, and the rate which they earn in-game currency towards loot boxes can be slow, both aspects which contribute towards in-game spending and the potential for gambling.

Overwatch 2, which released as a free to play title, did not use loot boxes and instead offered new cosmetic items through a battle pass system. An update in February 2025 brought back loot boxes to allow players to earn any cosmetic not on the current battle pass nor the current seasonal or collaboration shop content. These loot boxes can only be earned through gameplay or through the battle pass, and to minimize concerns over gambling aspects, will always include a high rarity item, with further higher rarity items guaranteed when opening every five and every twenty loot boxes.

==== Star Wars Battlefront II ====
Conversely, Electronic Arts' Star Wars Battlefront II, developed by EA DICE studio and released in November 2017, received heightened attention in the wake of the October 2017 loot-box criticism. Principally an online multiplayer shooter, Battlefront II was developed to eliminate the "season pass" approach that the original 2015 game had used, which was found to have split the player base over those that paid for the added content and those that did not. Instead, Battlefront II brought in other micro-transaction schemes that would still allow all players to play together but provided the desired revenue streams for EA. These schemes include a loot-box system providing, among other rewards, "Star Cards" that provide boosts to a specific character class, and which have tiered levels tied to rarity that provide greater boosts. Because these higher-tier Star Cards give direct advantages to players willing to acquire many loot boxes with real money than at the rate one would obtain simply playing the game, its loot-box system at the time of its open beta period had been described as one of the more egregious "pay-to-win" systems for a full-price game.

EA did re-evaluate this approach in response to criticism, and prior to full release, reworked the loot-box system so that some items still offered in loot boxes like Star Cards could also be earned through other routes such as in-game achievements, in-game currency, or through direct monetary purchase. Just prior to release, members of EA Access that had early access to the release version of Battlefront discovered that its other in-game currency and micro-transaction systems required players to spend numerous hours in game matches to earn credits at a sufficient rate to unlock special hero characters, or alternatively spend real-world funds to buy in-game currency or loot boxes that offered that currency as a possible reward. The combined loot-box and micro-transaction systems, all elements of "pay to win" schemes, drew even more criticism. Just hours before the game's official launch, EA and DICE temporarily disabled all micro-transaction purchases until they figured out a way to offer these systems in a favourable manner for consumers; DICE stated: "We will now spend more time listening, adjusting, balancing, and tuning" before they are reintroduced.

According to The Wall Street Journal, the decision to remove the micro-transactions just before launch was demanded by Disney, which owns the Star Wars properties. Disney, knowing the franchise draws in younger players, feared the loot-box systems would contribute towards gambling behavior in children. EA later affirmed its revamped approach to micro-transactions within the game to be released in March 2018, eliminating any pay-to-win elements like Star Cards as potential rewards from loot boxes: Star Cards would otherwise only be earned by an experience-point-based progression in the game, while loot crates would be limited to only cosmetic items or in-game credits to buy these items.

The player reaction to Battlefront's loot-box system led to the Belgian Gambling Commission to evaluate the nature of loot boxes specifically in Battlefront. In the United States, it generated legislative debates about a potential sales ban within Hawaii and some other US states. EA has stated that they do not consider the approach of loot boxes in Battlefront as gambling, as it is strictly an optional feature. The reaction and change to the loot box and monetisation scheme caused sales of Battlefront to fall from expectations, and EA's stock lost 8% of its value a week after the game's release (equal to about US$3 billion). Analysts expect that EA will have to re-evaluate how they monetise games in the future to avoid similar backlashes, which may further reduce future revenues.

In its fiscal quarter results following the release of Battlefront II, EA reported missing their sales mark of 10 million units by about 10%, which EA CFO Blake Jorgensen attributed to the loot-box controversy over the game. This, coupled with the removal of micro-transactions from the game while they readdressed the loot-box approach, led to the game missing EA's revenue projections for that quarter. In April 2018, EA's Patrick Söderlund stated that the loot-box controversy over Battlefront impacted the company significantly, which included a reorganisation of executive positions, and that: "For games that come next, for Battlefield or for Anthem, [players have] made it very clear that we can't afford to make similar mistakes. And we won't."

==== FIFA ====
Electronic Arts also published the FIFA series of association football games in annual installments, using the appearances and attributes of the real-world athletes in the teams on the league. Part of more recent entries in the system include its "Ultimate Team" mode, where players can form their own teams by collecting "cards" of these players, which have been offered through virtual card packs that can be purchased with in-game currency or real-world funds (Points currency). While this is a similar mechanism to other games using loot box mechanics, the use here is criticised due to the fact that cards earned from one version of the game do not carry over into the next year's version (teams remain in their account until the said edition's servers are shut down). Thus, players must work to regain a competitive team by re-earning in-game credits or spending more money by buying additional points, with the potential to continue that cycle each year. EA has since implemented Ultimate Team-like mechanics in other sports simulation series, including Madden NFL, NBA Live, NHL, and UFC.

In 2016, EA reported that revenue from Ultimate Team pack purchases was US$650 million a year, roughly half of their total revenue from microtransactions across their portfolio, and 30% of their entire digital sales revenue. CBC reported from a leaked 2021 EA presentation of the company's intent to drive FIFA 21 players to the Ultimate Team mode as the "cornerstone" of the game. In a reply, EA stated that they do not "push" players to spend money in their games and that the majority of FIFA players do not spend any money in-game.

== Regulation and legislation ==
Because of their use of random chance to gain items after committing real-world funds, games using loot boxes may be considered a form of gambling. While gambling laws vary from country to country, a common theme that tends to legally distinguish loot boxes from gambling is the inability to transform the contents from a loot box back into real-world money by legitimate means within the video game.

Games with loot box systems have become subject to regulation in several Asian countries, while questions of the legality of loot boxes are under consideration in some Western ones. Steven Wright for PC Gamer observed that several of the concerns for loot boxes related to gambling had been previously experienced through lawsuits in the 1990s against the baseball card industry as well as with the physical Pokémon Trading Card Game, but these cases did not impact either arena to a significant degree.

=== Asia and Oceania ===
==== China ====
In December 2016, China's Ministry of Culture announced legislation which required "online game publishers" to publicly release from May 2017 onwards the "draw probability of all virtual items and services". When the law came into effect publishers complied, resulting in a variety of statistics being released which quantified the odds of Chinese players receiving different categories of item from each loot box, some of which were as low as 0.1%. Other changes mandated by the new regulations required publishers to limit the number of loot box purchases any player can purchase in a day (including limiting the size of multiple loot box bundle packages), and requiring the publisher to give more favourable odds to the player to get rare items with the number of loot boxes they have opened, effectively assuring a player of receiving a rare item by opening a fixed number of loot boxes. A 2021 paper evaluated the state of many Chinese games that used loot boxes, and found that of the current top 100 games offered on China's Apple App store, 91 of those games included loot boxes but only about 5% of these made full, proper disclosure of loot box probabilities to China's law.

The law also banned game publishers from directly selling "lottery tickets" such as loot boxes. In June 2017, Blizzard Entertainment announced that, "in line with the new laws and regulations", loot boxes in their game Overwatch would no longer be available for purchase in China. Players would instead buy in-game currency and receive loot boxes as a "gift" for making the purchase.

Effective November 2019, China's General Administration of Press and Publication prohibited the sale of loot boxes to users under eight years of age and restricted their sale to older users under 18 years of age to a maximum monthly spending limit ranging from 200 to 400 renminbi.

==== Japan ====
Following the success of the gacha model in Puzzle & Dragons in 2011, it became recognised in Japan that the system was essentially gambling, particularly for younger players. By May 2012, Japan's Consumer Affairs Agency banned the practice of "complete gacha", in which a predetermined set of items gained from loot boxes would combine once completed to form a rarer and thus more valuable item. This was done not by introducing any new legislation, but by issuing a legal opinion that virtual items could be considered "prizes" under existing legislation written in 1977 to prevent the complete gacha practice in the context of baseball trading cards. Within a month of the opinion being issued, all major Japanese game publishers had removed complete gacha rules from their games, though many developers found ways around these rules. Japanese mobile game developers, including GREE and DeNA, worked to establish a self-regulating industry group, the Japan Social Game Association. However, this association was merged with The Computer Entertainment Supplier's Association (CESA) on April 1st, 2015.

==== South Korea ====
In March 2015, members of South Korea's National Assembly, led by the Liberty Korea Party, proposed amendments to the country's existing games industry regulation that would require games companies to release "information on the type, composition ratio, and acquisition probability" of items granted by loot boxes. Efforts by the South Korean games industry to self-regulate has not convinced assembly members, who have continued to propose statutory regulation. Chung Woo-taik, a Saenuri Party member, had questioned the practical effect of the self-regulation bill proposed by the industry, arguing that the lack of a proper penalty on loot box systems does not solve the problem and demean consumers' rights. However, there have been several revisions to the self-regulation (most recently, in July 2018), which now requires all video games to clearly display the payout rates of the items from the loot boxes to the player. There are also plans in the near future to expand the scope of this regulation to include other in-game purchases, such as the success rate of a paid consumable item whose purpose is to enhance another virtual item.

The Fair Trade Commission still oversees consumer issues related to loot boxes and video games; in April 2018, it issued a US$875,000 fine against Nexon related to its game Sudden Attack for deceptive loot-box practices, as well as two smaller fines to other companies.

The National Assembly passed a new law in February 2023 requiring games with loot boxes to publish the odds of acquiring certain items to players or to be fined, with enforcement starting in March 2024. This led, among other changes, for Respawn Entertainment to publish loot box rates for Apex Legends, while EA disabled Ultimate Team packs in FC 26 for Korean users.

==== Singapore ====
In October 2014, Singapore's parliament passed The Remote Gambling Act, which introduced a ban on unlicensed gambling websites and fines for anyone violating it. The law's definition of gambling included staking "virtual credits, virtual coins, virtual tokens, virtual objects or any similar thing that is purchased...in relation to a game of chance", leading to concerns that it would require producers of any game in which players paid money and received a randomised outcome to seek a license to operate from the government.

In response to games industry lobbying home affairs minister S. Iswaran clarified the law in parliament, stating that "the Bill does not intend to cover social games in which players do not play to acquire a chance of winning money and where the game design does not allow the player to convert in-game credits to money or real merchandise outside the game". The minister also specifically excluded platforms which offered "virtual currencies which can be used to buy or redeem other entertainment products", such as Steam, from the provisions of the bill.

However, the minister also said:

The fact is that the line between social gaming and gambling is increasingly becoming blurred. What may appear benign today can quickly morph into something a lot more sinister tomorrow in response to market opportunities and consumer trends. That is why the legislation is cast broadly.

The Remote Gambling Act was placed under review by Ministry of Home Affairs of Singapore in 2021 with the aim to amend the law be technology agnostic, and may potentially include regulations for loot boxes among other types of non-traditional gambling products.

==== Malaysia ====
In October 2021, the Office of the Mufti for Federal Territories in Malaysia published on its website and social media channels finding that the acquisition and ownership of items promoted in PUBG: Battlegrounds lootboxes are not always guaranteed despite enforcing an obligatory price of in-game currency to access them which would have to use real money, thus they qualify as a form of gambling (maisir) forbidden in Islamic jurispudence.

==== Australia ====
Within Australia, games with loot boxes would fall under gambling restrictions if they can be played "for money or anything else of value"; the question remains if items that only exist within game have "value" that can be quantified, even if this is related to an item's pretige. The Victorian Commission for Gambling and Liquor Regulation has stated that it considers loot boxes to be gambling, but does not have the authority to prosecute companies registered overseas. The commission has suggested "an immediate R rating" for any games which feature loot boxes as a solution to this limitation. In March 2018, the Australian Office of eSafety published a list of safety guidelines on the dangers of online loot boxes.

The Australian Senate passed a motion, led by Jordon Steele-John, in June 2018 directing the Environment and Communications References Committee to investigate loot boxes and report back to the Senate in September 2018. The investigation, which started in August 2018, evaluated the use of loot boxes in video games and considered them under issues related to gambling and effects on children. The report, released in mid-September 2018, found that loot boxes are "psychologically akin to gambling", and that games with loot boxes are potentially "exploiting gambling disorders among their customers". The committee recommended that games with loot boxes be labeled to warn of parental guidance and indicate that they contain "in-game gambling content" and suggest that such games be rated to represent the legal gambling age in the country. In the final report, the committee urged the Australian government to "undertake a comprehensive review of loot boxes in video games" through a multi-departmental effort to determine what legislative and other actions need to be taken.

A February 2020 report from the Australian House of Representatives Standing Committee on Social Policy and Legal Affairs that focused on internet content that should be blocked behind age verification gates recommended that the Office of the eSafety Commissioner or similar body "report to the Australian government on options for restricting access to loot boxes and other simulated gambling elements in computer and video games to adults aged 18 years or over, including through the use of mandatory age verification". By August 2020, the Australian Classification Board (ACB) had updated its regulations to state that games with any microtransaction, including loot boxes, must be labeled on their covers as containing "in-game purchases" as part of the ratings classification.

MP Andrew Wilkie introduced a bill in November 2022 that would require video games with loot boxes to be automatically rated by the ACB as R18+ or be refused a rating. By existing law, R18+ games are restricted from sale to minors. Wilkie stated that he believed that loot boxes in video games were grooming minors "for future gambling" as a rationale for the bill. The approach was modified in March 2023 so as to address any video game with simulated gambling, including loot boxes. These changes were implemented with enforcement starting in September 2024: games with simulated gambling would be rated R18+, and games "containing in-game purchases linked to elements of chance, including paid loot boxes" would be rated M.

==== New Zealand ====
The Gambling Commission within the Department of Internal Affairs for New Zealand stated, in response to a citizen's email, that currently in their view "loot boxes do not meet the legal definition of gambling", but are reviewing the situation as it progresses.

=== Europe ===
==== Austria ====
In March 2023, the district court of Hermagor ruled that loot boxes contained in FIFA (video game series) are gambling and thus illegal. The relevant question for the court was, if, on one hand, virtual goods have real value, and on the other hand, promise a gain. Especially with games of the FIFA series, there is a black market where players are traded for real money. The decision required Sony (in accepting the payment for EA) to refund the money spent on Ultimate Team packs to the users, and EA to label the FIFA games as "gambling games", requiring a license to use. The judgement is not final, and can be contested. However, Sony failed to apply for an appeal by May 2023, and subsequently, was ordered to refund money to the plaintiffs.

==== United Kingdom ====
In March 2017, the UK's Gambling Commission issued a position paper "Virtual currencies, esports and social casino gaming". The paper took the position that virtual items are "prizes", and that, in general "Where prizes are successfully restricted for use solely within the game, such in-game features would not be licensable gambling". However, the paper continues that:

In our view, the ability to convert in-game items into cash, or to trade them (for other items of value), means they attain a real world value and become articles of money or money's worth. Where facilities for gambling are offered using such items, a licence is required in exactly the same manner as would be expected in circumstances where somebody uses or receives casino chips as a method of payment for gambling, which can later be exchanged for cash.

In August 2017, the commission opened an investigation into skin gambling. Later, in November, the commission's executive director Tim Miller was interviewed on BBC Radio 4 where he confirmed that the commission had also been investigating loot boxes and suggested self-regulation of the games industry. The Commission issued a statement that month recognising that they cannot make the determination when loot boxes crosses over into gambling, as that they can only enforce what Parliament has issued as the law for gambling, and restating the legal definition of gambling in this regard from their earlier position paper. Miller said while they cannot take action toward loot boxes until Parliament changes the law, they can raise awareness of issues with loot boxes that might affect children and their parents, and are trying to evaluate the risks and issues associated with that as part of their August 2017 skin gambling investigation. Miller further stated that even if other countries were to pass laws or regulate loot boxes, the commission would still need to follow the UK's laws.

In October 2017, a month prior to the Battlefront II controversy, MP Daniel Zeichner of Cambridge, on behalf of a constituent, submitted a written parliamentary question "to ask the Secretary of State for Digital, Culture, Media and Sport (DCMS), what steps she plans to take to help protect vulnerable adults and children from illegal gambling, in-game gambling and loot boxes within computer games". In response, MP Tracey Crouch, parliamentary under-secretary for the department, referred back to the stance of the Gambling Commission's position paper, and said that:

The government recognises the risks that come from increasing convergence between gambling and video games. The Gambling Commission is keeping this matter under review and will continue to monitor developments in the market.

Separately, over 10,000 British citizens signed a petition requesting that the British government "adapt gambling laws to include gambling in video games which targets children", which includes issues over loot boxes. The government's response stated that the Video Standards Council is in discussions with Pan European Game Information (PEGI) to determine if there are any changes needed in the PEGI standards in relationship to gambling in games, and that the Gambling Commission is also considering the interaction between these games and younger players. The response also referenced the Consumer Protection from Unfair Trading Regulations 2008 law which, according to the response "includes a requirement on businesses not to subject anyone to misleading or aggressive marketing practices, or, for example, direct exhortation to buy products, such as games content, including in-game purchases such as loot boxes".

In March 2018, MP Anna Turley of Redcar asked the government to "bring forward legislative proposals to regulate the game mechanics of loot boxes". In response Minister of State MP Margot James said that "PEGI informs consumers purchasing products from major app stores if they contain further purchases and are considering the possibility of placing these notifications on boxed products", and that "regulators such as PEGI and the Gambling Commission are speaking to industry to ensure that those who purchase and play video games are informed and protected".

The Gambling Commission issued a report in November 2018 on the state of gambling and its effect on youth. While news outlets had stated that the Commission determined that loot boxes can be considered a gateway for youths to undertake gambling in other scenarios beyond video games, the Commission clarified that they had not made any direct conclusion, and only found that about 3 in 10 children in the UK have opened loot boxes in games. Starting in January 2019, the Department for Digital, Culture, Media and Sport of the House of Commons opened up public input on how immersive technology like virtual reality may impact culture, with a specific focus on "the addictive nature of some technologies". The department has also held public hearings with members of the video game industry to solicit their input. MP Margot James, the current Minister for Culture, Communications and Creative Industries, stated in these discussions that the UK's approach to how they treat loot boxes will likely be different from how other European states like Belgium have done, as the countries do not share similar laws for other gambling activities. James said "Loot boxes are a means of people purchasing items, skins, to enhance their gaming experience, not through an expectation of an additional financial reward. And also, more importantly, they can't be traded offline for money. So I think there are big differences, and I don't think really it is true to say loot boxes are gambling."

The Gambling Commission issued a statement in July 2019 that they cannot oversee the sale of loot boxes in most video games as there is no way to monetise the items within the loot box, a core distinction from gambling as written in current legislation. The Commission did caution that there are third-party sites that enable the means to monetise loot box items, similar to skin gambling, but they are not in a position to monitor those sited, and urged companies like Valve to take better steps to prevent skin gambling monetisation.

In its final report, published 9 September 2019, the Department for Digital, Culture, Media and Sport recommended that the British government take precautionary steps to prevent the sale of games containing loot boxes to minors, and to work with PEGI to make sure that games with loot boxes are labeled as having gambling mechanics. Further, the report stated that "We consider loot boxes that can be bought with real-world money and do not reveal their contents in advance to be games of chance played for money's worth" and urged the government to add games containing loot boxes as regulated under the Gambling Act 2005, which would restrict their sale. The report also agreed with the conclusions of the Gambling Commission that game publishes and developers must take more steps to limit the grey market of skin gambling. The Children's Commissioner for England came out with a report the following month echoing the same concerns, that loot boxes are akin to gambling for minors, and encouraged updates to gambling laws to reflect how games may use them to draw minors to continue to spend money.

The National Health Service director of mental health Claire Murdoch stated in January 2020 that the Service was incorporating concerns related to loot boxes and the mental health of youth into their Long Term Plan, but cautioned that "no company should be setting kids up for addiction by teaching them to gamble on the content of these loot boxes. No firm should sell to children loot box games with this element of chance, so yes those sales should end."

In June 2020, DCMS began requesting evidence from game companies related to loot boxes as part of a further investigation. It issued its first findings in July 2022, where it concluded that players of games with loot boxes were "more likely to experience gambling, mental health, financial and problem gaming-related harms". DCMS did not intend to change gambling laws in the UK to account for loot boxes as this "would have significant implementation challenges and risks of unintended consequence", but urged video game companies to employ measures to reduce the potential harm to players from loot boxes, such as implementing parental controls, more transparency on loot box odds, and warning players who have spent a large amount of money on loot boxes. The DCMS said they would not hesitate to change laws should the video game industry not work on these measures.

The House of Lords Gambling Committee released a special report on the state of gambling in the UK on July 2, 2020. The report identified the ongoing issue of loot boxes, how they may be seen as gambling and their effect on the youth, and concluded that "Ministers should make regulations under section 6(6) of the Gambling Act 2005 specifying that loot boxes and any other similar games are games of chance, without waiting for the Government's wider review of the Gambling Act."

The Advertising Standards Authority (ASA) issued guidance on mobile games in September 2021 aimed at how such games advertise their in-game premium currency. Among these factors, the ASA's guidance stated that games that included loot boxes must disclose this information on store pages and any advertising for the game. While the ASA cannot penalise companies that fail to follow their standards, being named by the ASA as going against their guidelines can be seen as a deterrent.

In February 2017, the Isle of Man's Gambling Supervision Commission updated their regulations to explicitly define virtual items as being "money's worth" even when not convertible into cash, explicitly bringing loot boxes under statutory regulation.

==== Netherlands ====
In April 2018, the Dutch Gaming Authority issued a legal opinion that games which both sell loot boxes and permit the "transfer" of yielded items are illegal. In its report "Study into loot boxes: A treasure or a burden?", the authority stated that four games of the ten it studied violated gambling law in this way. It concluded that while the loot-box systems in the six remaining games did not meet the threshold for legal action, they "nevertheless foster[ed] the development of addiction" and were "at odds" with the authority's objectives.

The authority gave the developers of the four unnamed games eight weeks to correct their loot-box system or face fines and potential bans on sales of the games in the Netherlands. Valve disabled the ability for players to trade in-game items from Counter-Strike: Global Offensive, Team Fortress 2, and Dota 2, stating that they were told by the Dutch Gaming Authority that they had until June 20, 2018, to remedy the loot-box situations within these games. On July 11, 2018, Valve re-enabled the ability for players to trade in-game items from Counter-Strike: Global Offensive, but restricted customers from the Netherlands and Belgium from opening loot boxes.

EA had not modified FIFA, leading to the Gaming Authority to seek fines from EA. EA had sued, but lost its case in October 2020, with the judge agreeing with the Gaming Authority's decision related to gambling, and was ordered to remove the ability to sell loot boxes to player in FIFA within three weeks or be fined a total of €500,000 per week up to a maximum €5 million until they were removed. EA has planned to appeal this decision. EA appealed the decision to the Dutch Administrative Jurisdiction Division, which overturned the decision in March 2022. The higher court ruled that since the Ultimate Team packs were part of the larger game of skill, it did not violate the Dutch gambling laws, reversing the fine against EA.

The authority's investigation was opened following a parliamentary question tabled by MP Michiel van Nispen in November 2017. Announcing the investigation, the regulator warned of the "possible dangers" of "addiction and large financial expenses". Following its April announcement, the Gaming Authority began to solicit other European Union countries to help harmonise their ruling on loot boxes among the Union. In April 2019, Psyonix disabled the ability for players in the Netherlands (and Belgium) to open loot crates with keys in Rocket League due to government regulations.

==== Belgium ====
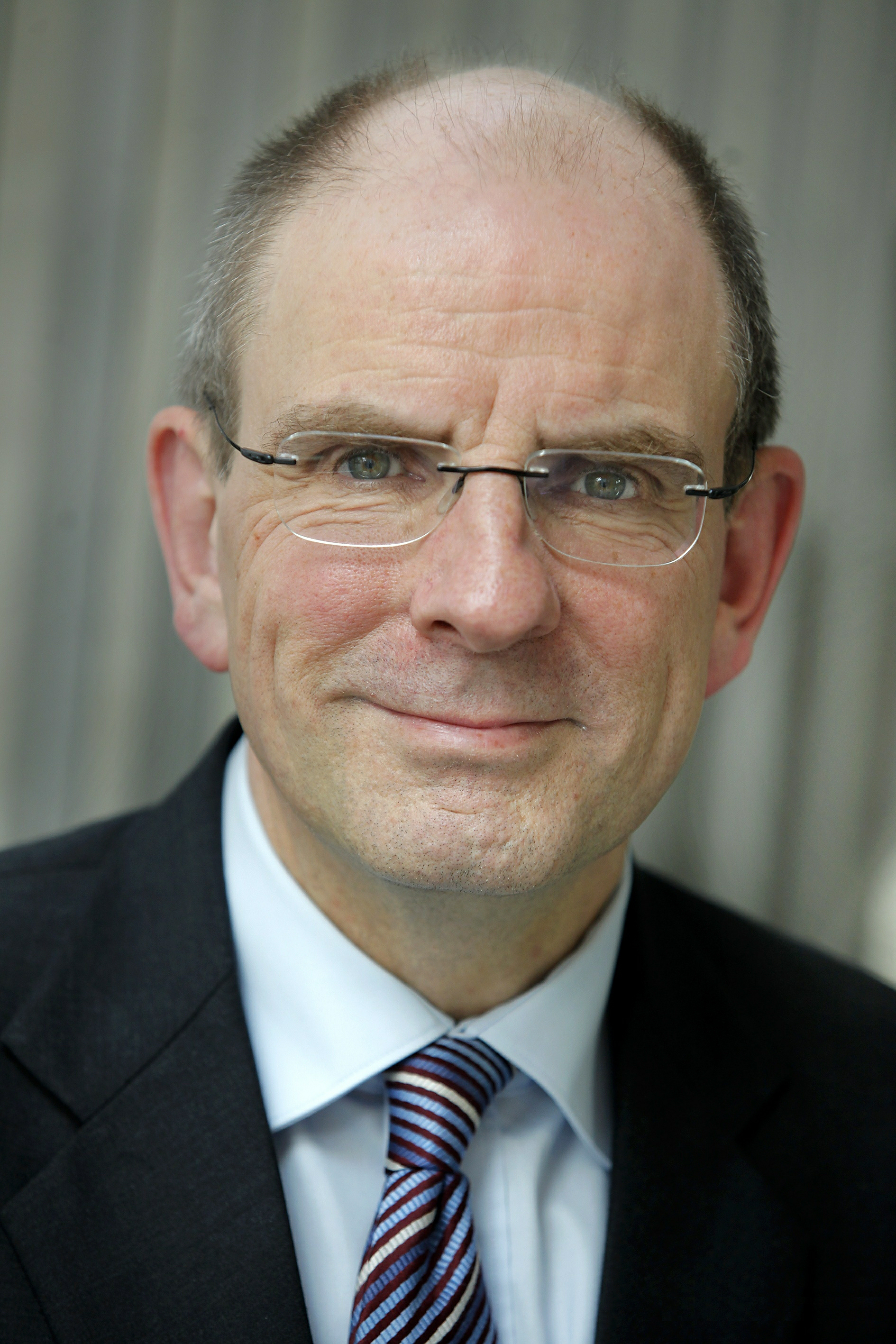
Belgium's Minister of Justice Koen Geens has led some of the country's decisions on restricting loot boxes and seeks to extend Belgium's approach to all of Europe.

In April 2018, shortly after the Netherlands' decision on loot boxes, the Belgian Gaming Commission completed its study of loot-box systems in four games, FIFA 18, Overwatch, Counter-Strike: Global Offensive and Star Wars Battlefront II, and determined that the loot-box systems in FIFA 18, Overwatch, and Counter-Strike: Global Offensive were considered games of chance and subject to Belgium's gambling laws. The Commission stated that for loot boxes in Overwatch, the action of opening a loot box is a game of chance to receive items of some perceived value to players, and there is no means to directly purchase in-game currency to obtain a specific item, while games like FIFA 18 merge reality and fantasy by using real-life athletes to promote the loot-box system. Belgium's Minister of Justice Koen Geens stated in these findings that "A dialogue with the sector is necessary" and that "It is often children who come into contact with such [loot box] systems and we cannot allow that".

The study was conducted starting in November 2017, during which Battlefront II had temporarily removed loot boxes, so was not considered in violation. The Commission ordered that the loot-box systems from these three games be removed, or otherwise the publishers could face criminal offenses and fines up to €800,000. Geens called for a European Union-wide ban of loot boxes, saying that "mixing gambling and gaming, especially at a young age, is dangerous for the mental health of the child".

In response to the announcement, several companies made their games with loot boxes unavailable to customers in Belgium with no financial recourse to customers who bought or paid for merchandise in the games:

- Valve said that they were "happy to engage with the Belgian Gambling Commission and answer any questions they may have". EA and Activision Blizzard declined to comment. As described above for the Netherlands, a patch to Counter Strike: Global Offensive in July 2018 prevented players from Belgium or the Netherlands from opening loot boxes.
- 2K Games modified NBA 2K to comply with the ruling by removing the ability to buy MyTeam random card packs with real-world funds for Belgian players, though they can still be purchased through in-game currency. 2K still asserted that loot boxes did not violate Belgium's gambling laws, and encouraged players to contact their local representatives regarding these removals.
- Blizzard Entertainment will block Belgian players of Overwatch and Heroes of the Storm from buying loot boxes, though they can still earn these through in-game rewards.
- ArenaNet disabled Belgian users from purchasing in-game currency with real-world funds from Guild Wars 2. While the game does not have loot boxes, it does have "Ecto Gambling" that allows players to use in-game currency to obtain random selections of items, which would similarly run afoul of Belgium gambling laws as they found for loot boxes.
- Square Enix announced the 2018 recall from app stores of three of its mobile games that include loot-box mechanics: Mobius Final Fantasy, Kingdom Hearts Union X, and Dissidia Final Fantasy Opera Omnia.
- Konami disabled the ability for those in Belgium from purchasing in-game currency in Pro Evolution Soccer 2019, which could then be used to buy loot boxes. Players are still able to earn this currency in-game.
- Simultaneously with its actions in the Netherlands in April 2019, Rocket League's developer Psyonix disabled the ability for Belgium players to open loot boxes.
- Nintendo closed down two of its mobile games, Animal Crossing: Pocket Camp and Fire Emblem Heroes for Belgian users, as both offer the ability to use real-world money to buy a random in-game item.

Electronic Arts' games FIFA 18 and FIFA 19 were also called out by the commission; however, EA did not make any modifications to these games; EA had previously stated in May 2018 that it did not believe the implementation of loot boxes in their games constituted gambling. As such, the commission has started actions with the Belgian courts to initiate legal action against EA by September 10, 2018, though whether such action is possible would be a decision of the public prosecutor's office. Ultimately on January 29, 2019, EA announced that it would stop selling FIFA Ultimate Team packs with microtransactions to players in Belgium by February, bringing them into compliance with the commission.

In July 2022, an academic study revealed that the Belgian ban on loot boxes has not been enforced by the Commission and that 82 of the 100 highest-grossing iPhone games were still selling loot boxes.

==== France ====
Following the controversy on loot boxes and microtransactions on release of Star Wars Battlefront II, French Senator Jérôme Durain wrote to ARJEL, a government-mandated authority that oversees online gambling, to ask them to investigate the situation with pay-to-win loot boxes. Durain's letter stated his concerns that "some observers point to a convergence of the video game world and practices specific to gambling" in his request. ARJEL's report, released in June 2018, does not immediately consider loot boxes as gambling, but does address the need to continue to investigate them further following a planned report to be published by the Gaming Regulators European Forum. ARJEL noted that items from loot boxes do not normally have monetary value, and even when they are traded through skin gambling, the publisher of such games do not participate in that arena, thus distancing loot boxes from other forms of gambling.

==== Germany ====
In February 2018, Germany's Commission for the Protection of Minors in the Media (KJM) announced research into loot boxes undertaken at the University of Hamburg which concluded that they present features "typical of gambling markets". Commission head Wolfgang Kreißig said that it was "conceivable that loot boxes could violate the ban on advertising to children and adolescents". The commission concluded in March 2018 that loot boxes can possibly violate the prohibition of direct advertisement appeals to buy products directed towards minors; however, the games that they studied were rated for players of at least 16 years old, and thus were not targeted to be played by minors. The commission remained open on hearing complaints towards loot boxes on specific games, though have no legal authority to enact any fines or penalties should they be found to be against law.

In October 2019, the Federal Department for Media Harmful to Young Persons (BPjM) stated it was looking into blacklisting the game Coin Master for distribution in Germany after Jan Böhmermann had discussed issues with the game's monetisation mechanics. While Coin Master does not use loot boxes, the game uses a gameplay mechanism that requires the player to play a virtual slot machine to advance in the game, with the opportunity to use items purchased with real-world funds to influence or bypass the slot machine to achieve desirable results, a model adapted by many other games and one that can encourage or trivialise excessive gambling. If Coin Master had been blacklisted, the BPjM may have opened the door for other games with similar monetisation routes to be reviewed. By March 2020, BPjM opted not to blacklist the game, but later announced in July 2020 that it may consider requiring games like Coin Master and games with loot boxes to be rated at a higher ratings level under a new Youth Protection Act that is expected to be passed and in enforcement in early 2021.

Germany's Bundestag passed revisions to the Youth Protection Act in March 2021 that would update the ratings systems for games to mark those with loot boxes or similar mechanics as "cost traps".

==== Sweden ====
Also in February 2018, Ardalan Shekarabi, the Swedish Minister for Public Administration, stated that he was "ready to ask [the] authorities to take a closer look at the phenomenon of loot boxes and see if there is a need to change legislation in order to strengthen consumer protection." He raised the prospect of loot boxes being classified as a lottery by 2019. Shekarabi instructed the Swedish Consumer Agency in May 2019 to review consumer protection around loot boxes, particularly in how well they protect minors.

==== Poland ====
In February 2019, the Polish Ministry of Finance issued a statement saying that loot boxes are not gambling in the light of the Polish law, although it noted that they may well constitute gambling in other jurisdictions. Polish law defines gambling very specifically, and the current definition is not applicable to loot boxes.

==== European Union ====
A July 2020 report prepared on behalf of the European Parliament Committee on the Internal Market and Consumer Protection (IMCP), "Loot boxes in online games and their effect on consumers, in particular young consumers", was one of the first reports to reframe loot boxes as a matter of consumer protection rather than a gambling concern. The report identified that loot boxes in video games have "problematic design features" that create an "irresistible urge to play" and a "growing tension that could only be relieved by playing" in an addictive loop. While the report identified this had similarities with gambling, the authors also urged that the European Parliament consider the loot box issue at a consumer protection standpoint since it can create addictive behavior particularly in young persons. The report included recommendations such as restrictions on design features that encourage the addictive loop, better disclosure from publishers to players on loot box odds and the risks of playing such games, parental controls, and consumer testing with governmental oversight.

A report by the Norwegian Consumer Council and backed by 18 other EU countries, released in May 2022, found that loot boxes in games like FIFA and Raid: Shadow Legends were "exploitative and predatory", and positioned the EU to include regulations related to loot boxes in upcoming directive discussions.

=== North America ===
==== United States ====
There are presently no laws in the United States targeting loot boxes, though the renewed interest in the issues with skin gambling from mid-2016 highlighted several concerns with using virtual items for gambling purposes. In past case law, courts have ruled that gambling with virtual currency within a video game is not illegal as long as there are no ties to real money, steps Blizzard Entertainment and Riot Games have done with their titles. Further, most states define gambling laws based on receiving something of value from paying for a game of chance, and traditionally, in-game items are considered to have no value in previous case law. However, with more technically literate court judges that may consider "value" more than just a financial value, alongside new perception of how much value in-game items can have resulting from the skin gambling situation, could change how the framework in the United States would classify loot boxes.

Hawaii state representatives Chris Lee and Sean Quinlan issued a statement in November 2017 taking a stance against loot boxes. "These kinds of lootboxes and microtransactions are explicitly designed to prey upon and exploit human psychology in the same way casino games are so designed." They plan to introduce legislation in the State of Hawaii, specifically to block sale of Star Wars Battlefront II, and that they have spoken to lawmakers from other states to enact similar laws, such that federal legislation could be possible if enough states take action. Quinlan stated:

I realized just how bad it has gotten. We've been on this path for 15 years with day-one DLC, subscription passes, pay-to-win. We as consumers kept accepting that, kept buying those games. Now we're at a place where we need to consider, do we need to legislate? Does the ESRB have to consider a new rating that could deal with gambling and addictive mechanics?

Rather than passing legislation that could have a slippery slope of harmful effects on the industry, Quinlan stated he would prefer to see the industry self-regulate, either by excluding gambling-like mechanics in games marketed to children, or have the industry rate games with these mechanics for more mature audiences which would affect how they would be sold and marketed. Lee later outlined how he would present a law, which would ban the sale of games to anyone under 21 if it contained a gambling element, defined if real-world funds are used to provide a "percentage chance" of receiving a specific in-game item rather than the item directly, applied both at retail and at digital distribution.

By February 2018, two separate bills were introduced in Hawaii's state legislature: one bill would require retail games featuring loot-box mechanisms to have clear labeling stating "Warning: contains in-game purchases and gambling-like mechanisms which may be harmful or addictive", while a second bill would regulate sale of these games to only those 21 years of age or older, the minimum age for gambling within the state. However, by March 2018, the bills failed to meet necessary requirements to be considered in the legislation, and were dropped. In January 2018, three senators in Washington state introduced Senate Bill 6266 (S-3638.1) in the state legislature, which would, if enacted, order the Washington State Gambling Commission to investigate loot boxes and their potential effect on underage gambling. Minnesota introduced a bill in April 2018 that would prohibit sale of games with loot-box systems to children under 18 years of age, and require specific labelling on these games to alert consumers to the loot-box system.

In early May 2019, Republican Senator Josh Hawley of Missouri announced that he intends to introduce a bill named "The Protecting Children from Abusive Games Act" that would ban loot boxes and pay-to-win microtransactions in "games played by minors", using similar qualifications to determine this as previously defined in the Children's Online Privacy Protection Act. The Federal Trade Commission would be responsible for enforcing the bill by making judgements and leveling fines for games that fail to take these steps. The bill was formally introduced in the United States Senate in the 116th Congress on May 23, 2019, as Senate Bill 1629, with co-sponsors Ed Markey (Massachusetts) and Richard Blumenthal (Connecticut), both Democrats. The bill was referred to the Senate Committee on Commerce, Science, and Transportation at that time, and no further action was taken on it, with the bill expiring at the end of the 116th United States Congress on January 3, 2021.

In the wake of the May 2022 Norwegian Consumer Council's report on loot boxes, fifteen advocacy groups wrote an open letter to the Federal Trade Commission urging them to evaluate FIFA and its Ultimate Team packs for its "manipulative design abuses", based on evidence from the Norwegian report.

Genshin Impact's developer MiHoYo settled with the FTC in January 2025 to end a lawsuit brought by the FTC over loot boxes. The FTC claimed that Genshin Impact players under 16 years of age could purchase loot boxes, failed to disclose the odds of obtaining goods from loot boxes or their real-world costs, and used dark pattern tactics to draw players to buy loot boxes. In addition to paying the FTC $20 million, MiHoYo says they will implement controls to prevent younger players from purchasing loot boxes without parental approval, and improve disclosure around loot boxes.

=== South America ===
==== Brazil ====
Brazil's government passed Lei 15.211/2025, which among other provisions to regulate digital content for minors, bans the sales of games including loot box mechanics to children under 18, with the enforcement to start in March 2026.

=== Multi-national ===
In September 2018, members from the gambling commissions from fifteen European nations, including Austria, the Czech Republic, France, Ireland, Latvia, the Netherlands, Norway, Poland, Portugal, Spain, UK, as well as the state of Washington from the United States, announced a collaborative effort to "address the risks created by the blurring of lines between gaming and gambling". While the group's specific focus will be on skin gambling sites, they will be looking to "ensure that features within games, such as loot boxes, do not constitute gambling under national laws".

=== Self-regulation ===
Video game industry bodies have generally stated that they cannot regulate loot boxes as gambling unless the law of their countries specify what counts as gambling within games.

==== Europe ====
In many European countries, voluntary ratings for video games are provided by PEGI. PEGI has stated that a game having a loot-box system will not automatically require its "gambling content" descriptor. PEGI further stated that "It's not up to PEGI to decide whether something is considered gambling or not—this is defined by national gambling laws".

Parliamentary questions in the United Kingdom revealed in March 2018 that PEGI is "considering the possibility of placing [in-game purchase] notifications on boxed products". PEGI announced in April 2020 that it will add the supplementary label "Includes Paid Random Items" for games featuring loot box-like mechanics. By July 2026, PEGI will require games with paid random items, including loot boxes, to be rated PEGI 16 or stricter, among other similar changes as to help parents make informed decisions for their children.

==== Japan ====
Before the disbanding of the Japan Social Game Association (JSGA) in 2015, it issued 2 self-regulatory guidelines for in-game gacha: provide a minimum 1% payout rate and establish a payment ceiling. For example, if a player has poured certain amount of money in gacha, the player is given a chance to choose whatever reward they want from the gacha pool freely. The association recommended a 50,000-yen ceiling.

The Japan Online Game Association (JOGA), which now serves as the Japanese video game industry's self-regulatory body in lieu of JSGA, also issued similar guidelines with further specifications such as "listing all available rewards from the lootbox and payout rates of all rewards" and "listing changes to all available rewards and payout rates upon software revision, specifically during festive campaign with a deadline". While the new guideline does not recommend any payment ceiling, it recommends to display the expected maximum bet in order to guarantee obtaining the item if it exceeds 50,000 yen.

==== United Kingdom ====
UKIE, the video game industry trade organisation for the United Kingdom, asserted its stance that loot boxes do not constitute gambling and are "already covered by and fully compliant with existing relevant UK regulations".

==== United States ====
The Entertainment Software Ratings Board (ESRB), like PEGI, provides voluntary video game content ratings for games in the United States. ESRB does not consider loot boxes as a form of gambling, and will not rate such games with their "Real Gambling" content descriptions. ESRB considers that loot boxes are equivalent to collectible card game booster packs, and that the player is always receiving something of value with opening a loot-box purchase, even if it is not something the player desires. The Board further stated that games that are labelled with "Real Gambling" will likely be then rated "AO" (Adults Only), to comply with gambling laws; retailers typically do not stock such games, and would thus harm a publisher. Additionally, the ESRB also sees themselves as responsible to help guide parents on video game content. As an example, they found that parents were more worried about children spending money in-game and not any gambling aspects, and thus did not include loot boxes as one of its content descriptions, though would like to add them in the future should legislation or other industry standards establish gambling as a critical issue.

The Entertainment Software Association, the parent organization of the ESRB, asserted loot boxes are not a form of gambling, stressing that they are a voluntary and optional aspect in these games. Major publishers Electronic Arts and Take-Two Interactive have also stated they do not see loot boxes as gambling due to their voluntary nature. Electronic Arts' CEO Andrew Wilson stated in May 2018 that they will continue to include loot boxes in their games, and "While we forbid the transfer of items of in-the-game currency outside, we're also actively seeking to eliminate that where it's going on in an illegal environment, and we're working with regulators in various jurisdictions to achieve that".

While other publishers have acquiesced to governmental concerns about loot boxes, Electronic Arts has been generally steadfast in that they do not believe their implementation of loot boxes is a form of gambling. In statements made at hearings with the British Digital, Culture, Media, and Sport Committee, EA representatives compared loot boxes to "surprise mechanics" that one would find with Kinder Surprise eggs, and believe that their implementation of loot boxes are "quite ethical and quite fun, quite enjoyable to people".

In the wake of the criticism over Star Wars Battlefront II, financial analysts suggested that the video game industry will need to develop self-regulating principles to better handle monetisation and loot-box schemes to avoid government intervention into the industry.

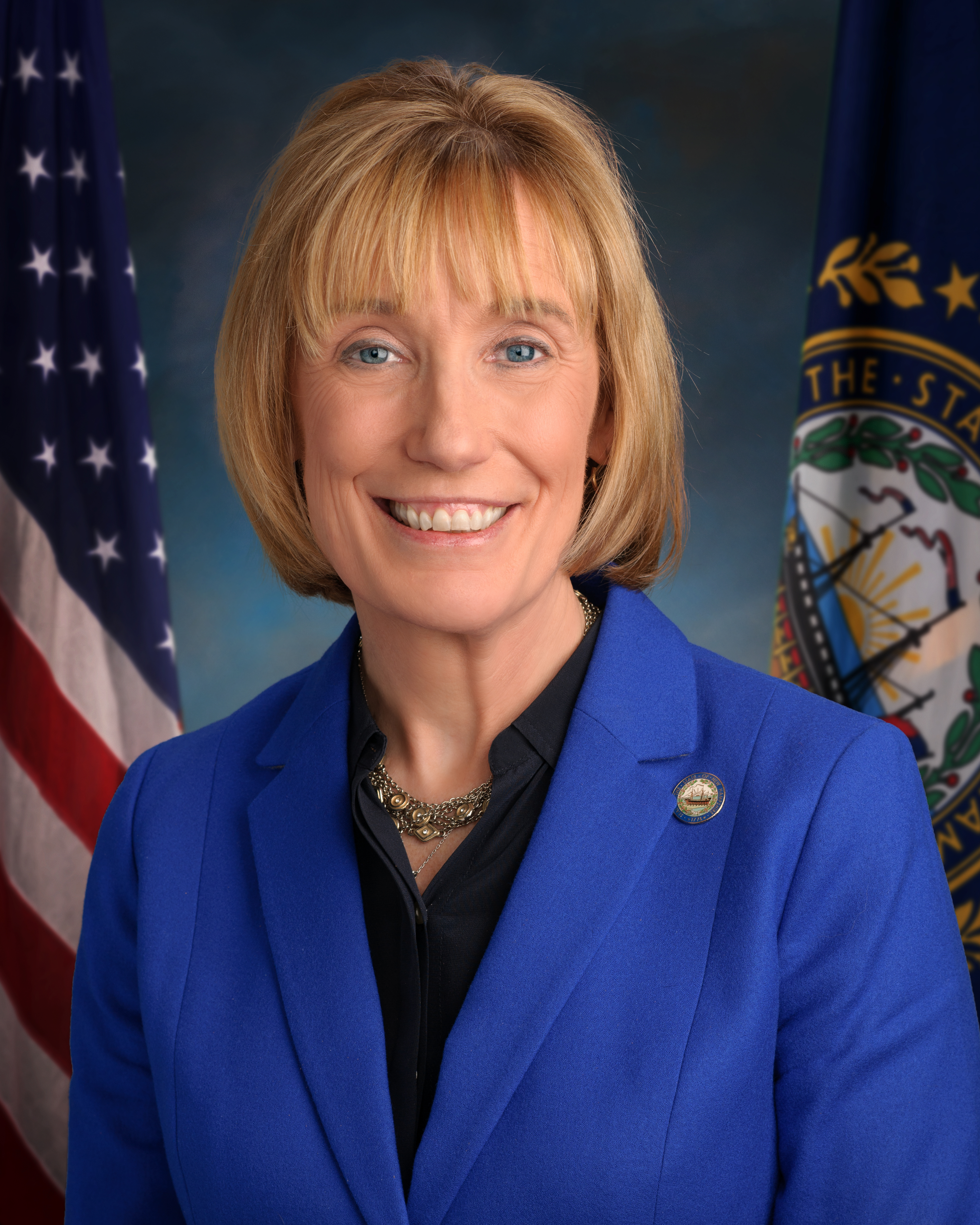
Sen. Maggie Hassan urged the ESRB to self-regulate the industry with respect to loot boxes in February 2018.

In February 2018, Senator Maggie Hassan brought up the issue of loot boxes during a hearing of the Senate Commerce, Science and Transportation Committee to four Federal Trade Commission nominees, which the Commission oversees. She asked the nominees if "that children being addicted to gaming—and activities like loot boxes that might make them more susceptible to addiction—is a problem that merits attention?"; all four nominees agreed attention would be necessary. The same day, Hassan authored a letter to the ESRB "to review the completeness of the board's ratings process and policies as they relate to loot boxes, and to take into account the potential harm these types of micro-transactions may have on children" and "to examine whether the design and marketing approach to loot boxes in games geared toward children is being conducted in an ethical and transparent way that adequately protects the developing minds of young children from predatory practices." Though neither the hearing nor the letter called for regulation, Brian Crecente of Glixel considered these as pretense to get the ESRB to act on its own before Congress would be forced to take legislative action.

In response to Hassan's letter, the ESRB announced in February 2018 that it would require any rated game that offers any type of in-game purchase with real-world funds, encompassing loot boxes, would be required to be labeled as such. ESRB stated the labeling was primarily meant to help parents watch for games for their children, and because of the brevity of space they have on retail packaging, did not opt to require publishers to identify the specific form of microtransaction. However, the board still asserted that they still do not believe loot boxes themselves are a form of gambling. While Sen. Hassan called the ESRB's decision a "step forward", she still remained concerned of "the ESRB's skepticism regarding the potentially addictive nature of loot boxes and microtransactions in video games", and stated "I will work with all relevant stakeholders to continue oversight on these issues and ensure that meaningful improvements are made to increase transparency and consumer protections." The ESRB introduced this new label "In-Game Purchases (Includes Random Items)" in April 2020 to be used for games that include loot box-style mechanics.

During a November 2018 Congressional hearing over problems with Cambridge Analytica's data leak and associated with Facebook and Google, Joseph Simons, chairman of the Federal Trade Commission (FTC), promised to Congress that the FTC will investigate loot boxes, considering the potential market value of microtransactions. After the government had shut down in early 2019, delaying the FTC review, Hassan pushed on the FTC to provide an update on their review of loot boxes.

The FTC held a public hearing on loot boxes on August 7, 2019, addressing industry representative and reviewing public comments submitted prior to the meeting. During the meeting, ESA representatives stated that Microsoft, Nintendo, and Sony are working on developing requirements for new or updated games using loot boxes, published on their respective console systems, to disclose the odds for items from loot boxes. Other publishers within the ESA, including Activision Blizzard, Bandai Namco, Bethesda, Bungie, Electronic Arts, Take-Two Interactive, Ubisoft, Warner Bros., and Wizards of the Coast, also stated they are committed to doing the same for other gaming platforms such as on personal computers, as to align with the existing requirements for the iOS App Store and Google Play mobile platforms. These efforts are expected to be in place before the end of 2020, according to the ESA. Nintendo issued a new policy the next day to reflect the statement made to the FTC, requiring loot box odds to be published for all new and updated games on its systems, and assuring such games with in-game purchases could be regulated by parents on their Nintendo Switch Online app. Epic Games affirmed they would also follow similar policies as adopted by the ESA and other publishers, already having taken steps to eliminate loot boxes from Fortnite, Rocket League and other games in its portfolio.

==== Worldwide ====
Apple implemented changes to the iOS App Store in December 2017, requiring developers that publish games to the Store that include monetised loot boxes or other similar mechanisms that provide random items in exchange for real-world funds, to publish the odds of items that can be received from these mechanisms prior to the player spending funds on the game. Google followed suit by May 2019, requiring apps in the Play Store using loot box mechanics to publish their odds. In November 2018, the International Game Developers Association (IGDA) urged the video game industry to take action on loot boxes before governments step in to regulate them. IGDA identified three areas for the industry to focus on: commit to not marketing loot-box mechanics to youth, disclose the odds of receiving items in loot boxes, and educate parents on in-game parental controls. In February 2019, review aggregator OpenCritic began incorporating details about games that use loot boxes into its summary pages for games. In the academic literature, King and Delfabbro proposed twenty-four "social responsibility" measures that could be implemented by video game companies to prevent or reduce overspending on loot boxes. However, the willingness of the industry to adopt these measures has been questioned because of the industry's economic interests.

In 2024–2025, several countries updated their regulatory approaches to loot boxes. Belgium continued enforcing its classification of paid loot boxes as gambling, effectively prohibiting their use in commercial games. The Netherlands adopted a more flexible framework, allowing certain implementations while restricting those that resemble games of chance. China strengthened its consumer‑protection rules by requiring developers to publicly disclose the probability of obtaining specific items and by limiting the frequency of randomized purchases. Japan also maintains restrictions on "Kompu Gacha," a monetization mechanic closely related to loot boxes, due to concerns about consumer harm.

A series of 2023–2025 reports from the UK Parliament examined whether loot boxes should fall under gambling legislation. The reports summarized industry self‑regulation efforts, government recommendations, and calls for updated consumer‑protection laws. While the UK has not formally classified loot boxes as gambling, the reports emphasized the need for stronger safeguards for children and greater transparency in game monetization.

== Litigation ==
In February 2020, two separate class-action lawsuits were filed in France against Electronic Arts over the Ultimate Team part of the FIFA games asserting it is equivalent to unregulated gambling. One class member asserted they spent over €600 on Ultimate Team packs and never received a high-ranking place, which was necessary to get to be able to compete online with other players. The suits also contend that the FIFA games lack any parental controls to limit spending, which, combined with the pay-to-win nature of Ultimate Team, encourage underage gambling, directly referencing the 2019 decisions from Belgium and the Netherlands.

A class-action lawsuit filed in California in June 2020 against Apple asserted that through the games using loot boxes mechanics offered by Apple's App Store, Apple "engages in predatory practices enticing consumers, including children to engage in gambling and similar addictive conduct in violation of this and other laws designed to protect consumers and to prohibit such practices". The lawsuit asserts that with these apps, Apple allows their devices to become unauthorised gambling devices which are illegal under California's code.

Another class-action lawsuit was filed against EA in California in August 2020 over their Ultimate Team loot boxes in FIFA and Madden NFL games, with the plaintiff represented by the same legal firm as the June 2020 case against Apple. The EA case seeks a jury trial to decide if the Ultimate Team loot boxes are considered gambling mechanisms under California law, and seek US$5 million in damages. Yet another lawsuit brought against EA in California in November 2020 asserted that the Dynamic Difficulty Adjustment feature used in the FIFA, Madden NFL, and NHL series, each which use a variation on the Ultimate Team approach, is purposely designed to alter the playing habits of gamers to reduce their chances of gaining Ultimate Team drops in game and draw them to purchase such items through microtransactions. This lawsuit was dropped in March 2021 after EA provided technical information and gave the plaintiff access to their engineers to make the assessment that the Dynamic Difficulty Adjustment was not used in any of the Ultimate Team modes.

A class action lawsuit was filed in Illinois against Take Two Interactive in January 2022 for the use of loot box mechanics in the NBA 2K series. The lawsuit, filed by the parent of a minor, states that the games "psychologically distance" the implications of loot box purchases from real-world financial costs, and thus engages in deceptive practices.

== Impact ==
As a result of the heightened criticism and regulation in late 2017, developers and publishers have pulled loot boxes from their games. Such games include Star Wars Battlefront II, Dauntless, Middle-Earth: Shadow of War, Forza Motorsport 7, and Rocket League. Others have adopted other monetization methods that eliminate the random elements associated with loot boxes, such as challenge-based battle passes stemming from Fortnite Battle Royale.

Other games have kept loot boxes but altered how they can be purchased or their mechanics to eliminate some of the randomness and gambling attributes associated with them. In March 2019, Heroes of the Storm removed the ability to buy loot boxes with real money. Loot boxes with random content are still available as free in-game rewards, but, after the March patch, cosmetic options are available for direct purchase with real money as well.

In January 2019, Epic Games adjusted the mechanics of Fortnite: Save the World's loot boxes that are purchased with real-world funds, allowing purchasers to see the contents of the loot box before buying, as to address concerns of loot boxes being related to gambling; in 2022, Epic removed the ability to buy loot boxes and starter packs with real money. EA introduced a similar mechanic in FIFA 21 in June 2021 called Ultimate Team Preview Packs, allowing users to preview the contents of these packs before they purchase.
