= Loot (video games) =

Acquiring items in video games

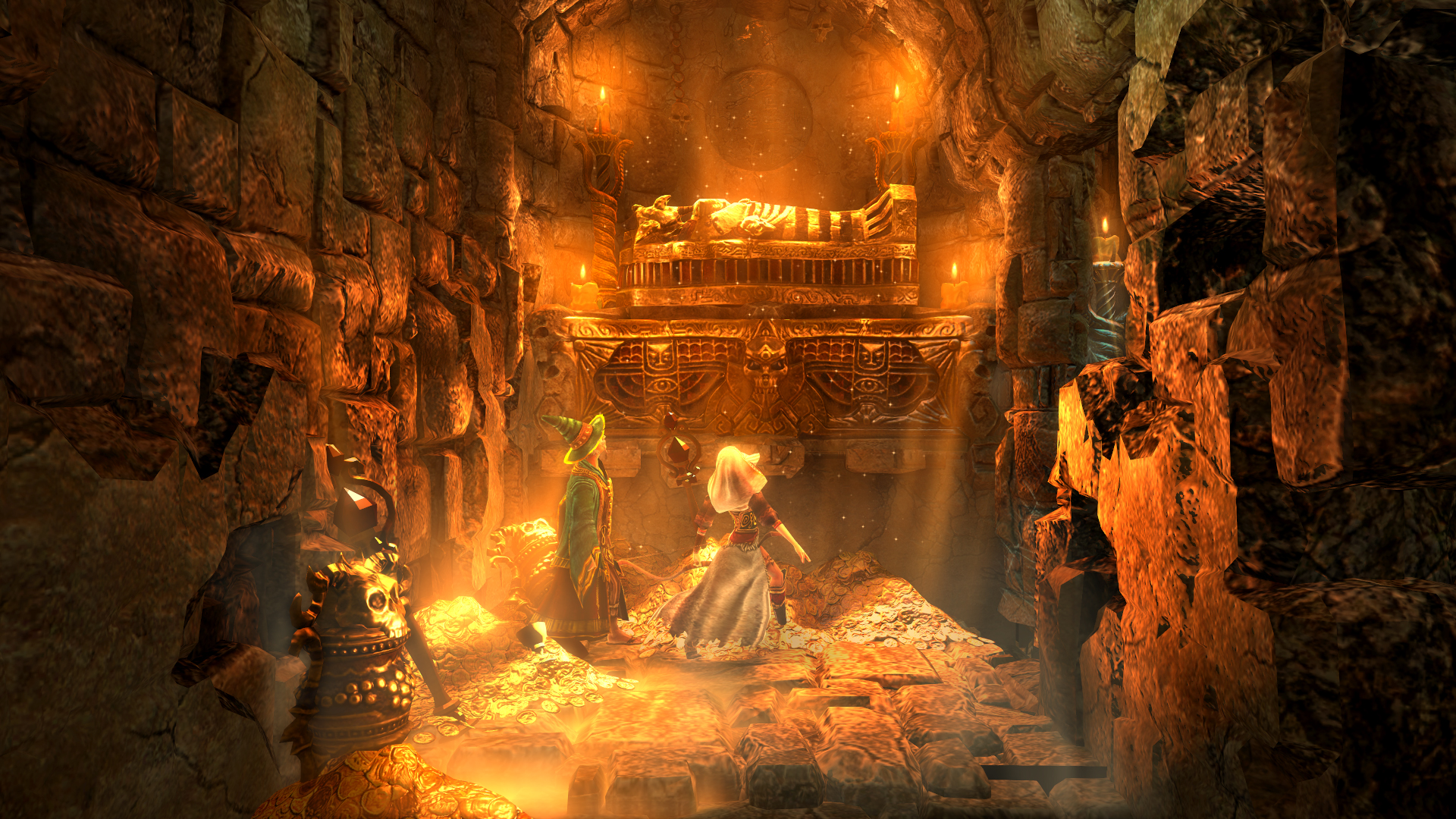
Characters discovering treasure in the game Trine 2

In video games, loot is the collection of items picked up by the player character that increase their power or level up their abilities, such as currency, spells, equipment and weapons. Loot is meant to reward the player for progressing in the game, and can be of superior quality to items that can be purchased. It can also be part of an upgrade system that permanently increases the player's abilities. Loot boxes are a particular type of randomized loot system that consists of boxes that can be unlocked through normal play, or by purchasing more via microtransaction.

== Functions ==
Early computer role-playing games such as SSI's Gold Box series rewarded player progress with in-game treasure, which was typically preset in the games' programming. Recent games tend to randomly or procedurally generate loot, with better loot such as more powerful weapons or stronger armor obtained from more difficult challenges. The random nature of loot was established in the roguelike genre of games and made mainstream through Blizzard Entertainment's Diablo which was based on roguelike design principles. Fixed items, determined essential for game progress, may also drop alongside random loot.

In single-player games, loot is often obtained as treasure through exploration or looted from defeated enemies, and loot is considered distinct from items purchased from in-game shops. In multiplayer games, loot may be provided in such a manner that only one player may acquire any given item. "Ninja-looting" is the resulting practice of looting items off enemies defeated by other players. Players may choose to employ a loot system to distribute their spoils. In a PVP situation, loot may be taken from a defeated player.

In role-playing video games or loot shooters, loot often forms the core economy of the game, in which the player fights to obtain loot and then uses it to purchase other items. Loot is often assigned to tiers of rarity, with the rarer items being more powerful and more difficult to obtain. The various tiers of rarity are often indicated by particular colors that allow a player to quickly recognize the quality of their loot. The concept of color-coded loot rarity was initially popularized with the 1996 game Diablo and its 2000 sequel Diablo II, whose designer, David Brevik, took the idea from the roguelike video game Angband. In Diablo, equippable items were either white (normal), blue (magic) or gold (unique), and Diablo II expanded on this with either grey (inferior), white (common), blue (magic), yellow (rare), orange (unique) or green (set). Blizzard Entertainment later re-used the system for the 2004 game World of Warcraft, where items were either grey (poor), white (common), green (uncommon), blue (rare), purple (epic) or orange (legendary). Following World of Warcraft's popularity, most loot-driven games have since based their own system off this same color-coding hierarchy, (e.g. Titan Quest, Borderlands, Overwatch, Torchlight, Destiny, and Fortnite). The quality of loot often scales with the tiers but not always, and higher tier loot can sometimes only be found in later stages of the game.

== Loot boxes ==
Loot boxes are a particular type of randomized loot system that consists of boxes that can be unlocked through normal play, or by purchasing more via microtransaction. They originated in massively multiplayer online role-playing games and mobile games, but have since been adopted by many AAA console games in recent years. The system has garnered a great deal of controversy for being too similar to gambling, along with giving players a means to circumvent normal progression through additional monetary transactions. Games that allow for certain players to have unfair advantages over other players via paid loot boxes are referred to as "pay-to-win" by critics.
