= CS.Money =

Marketplace for Counter-Strike skins

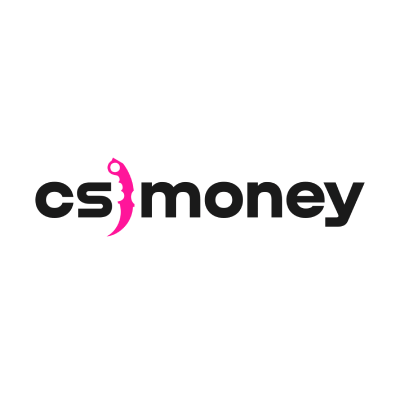
- Company type: Private
- Founded: 2016
- Founder: Pavel Dunaev
- Headquarters: Limassol, Cyprus
- Key people: Pavel Dunaev (CEO)
- Website: cs.money

CS.Money is a marketplace for trading and exchanging in-game items ("skins") from the Counter-Strike series, including Counter-Strike: Global Offensive and Counter-Strike 2. Founded in 2016 by Pavel Dunaev, the company is part of the holding group Ex corp., which also includes Scope.gg, Xplay.gg and Lvl.io. It is headquartered in Limassol, Cyprus.

== History ==
CS.Money was founded by Pavel Dunaev, then a physics student at Perm State University. Having been interested in video games since childhood, he identified the potential of the emerging skins market in Counter-Strike: Global Offensive while at university. In January 2015, he began trading and reselling skins.

Dunaev and his team initially developed a bot to automate deals on online forums. In 2015, the business generated about $50,000 in revenue. In May 2016, the team launched CS.Money, a platform on which skins purchased from players were listed for sale. CS.Money was among the first services to offer automated skin valuation and exchange, allowing users to see prices immediately rather than negotiate them.

In its first year, the service generated no revenue because the marketplace took its commission in the form of additional skins. From 2018, CS.Money monetised through the sale of virtual currency and commissions on each transaction. The team later closed its Russian legal entity and relocated the company entirely to Cyprus.

In August 2022, a lone hacker breached the CS.Money platform and stole skins worth about $10 million. The company identified the hacker within a week, but recovered only about half of the stolen items. After the breach, the site was taken offline for a month while its security systems were reviewed, leading to a one-third reduction in its audience.

== Sponsorships and partnerships ==
The company has sponsored various esports tournaments and leagues, including BLAST Premier, as well as teams such as Astralis and Natus Vincere.

In February 2023, major CS:GO skin-trading platforms, including CS.Money, CS.Trade, Waxpeer and others, formed the non-profit Skin Traders Alliance (STA), which was presented as an initiative to improve the safety and transparency of the skins market.

In 2024, CS.Money announced a sponsorship programme for smaller teams competing at Counter-Strike Majors. Beginning with the PGL CS2 Major Copenhagen 2024, one selected team would receive $20,000 in sponsorship support and a further $20,000 if it reached the playoffs.

== Financials ==
According to Forbes Russia, the company's revenue reached $39.6 million in 2020 amid marketing growth and the wider expansion of the gaming market during the COVID-19 pandemic. In 2021, revenue fell to $32.4 million amid a broader downturn in the gaming sector. In 2022, Ex corp. reported revenue of $20.8 million and no profit. By autumn 2023, the group had returned to its pre-crisis audience size; revenue reached $19.7 million, of which 90% came from CS.Money.

The company's growth enabled the launch of several related businesses: Scope.gg, a Counter-Strike training and analytics platform, launched in May 2020; Xplay.gg, a play-to-earn service, launched in August 2021; and Lvl.io, a business gamification service, launched in 2023. Dunaev and his partners combined these services into the Ex corp. holding group.

At the end of 2022, Ex corp. employed 169 people.
