= Washington State Gambling Commission =

State agency of Washington

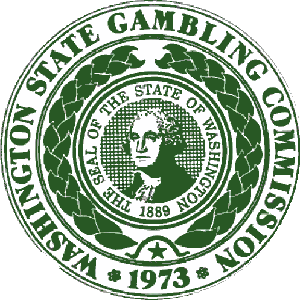

Agency overview
- Formed: 1973
- Type: Gaming control board
- Jurisdiction: Washington
- Headquarters: 4565 7th Avenue S.E. Lacey, Washington, United States
- Employees: 160
- Agency executives: Tina Griffin, Director; Alicia Levy, Chairman
- Website: Washington State Gambling Commission

The Washington State Gambling Commission is an agency of the government of the State of Washington, founded in 1973 as the state's gaming control board, which is responsible for enforcing gambling laws and regulations. This organization is the second oldest national agency of such a type. The director of Washington State Gambling Commission is Tina Griffin, who has been the director since 2022.
