= Danger (musician) =

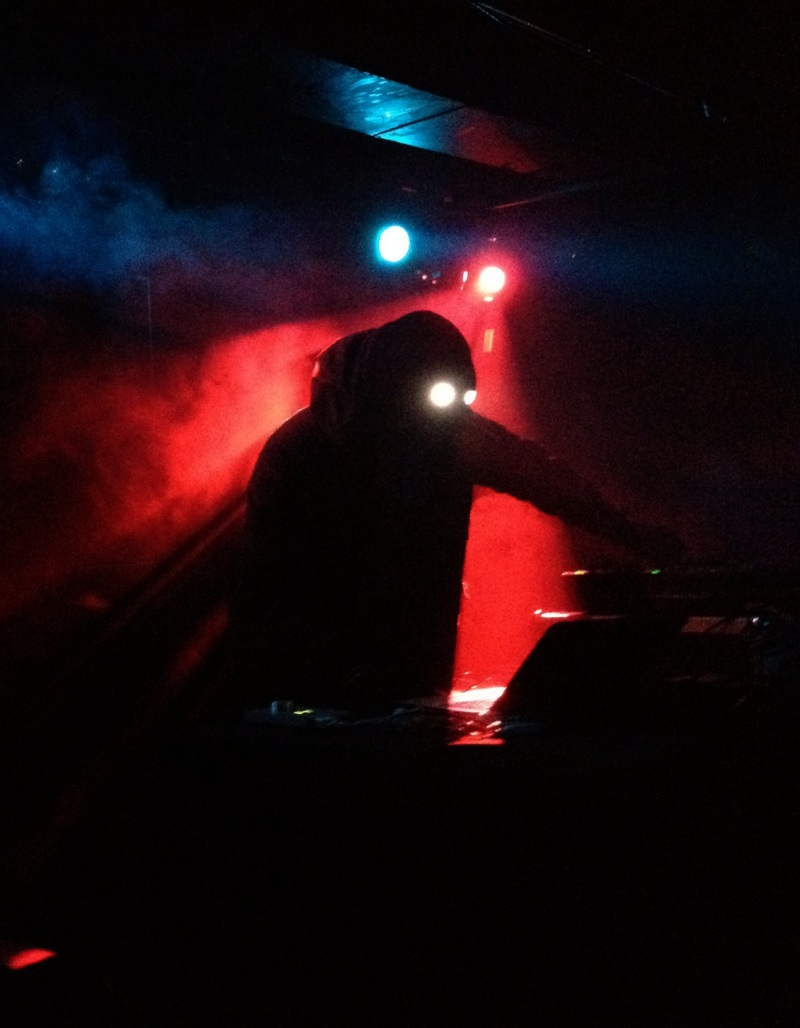
- Danger performing in Vancouver, Canada in June 2012

Background information
- Also known as: Danger
- Born: Franck Rivoire
- Origin: Lyon, France
- Genres: Electronic, trip hop, electro house, witch house, French house, synthwave
- Occupation: Musician
- Instruments: Computer, synthesizer
- Years active: 2007–present
- Labels: Ekler'o'shock; 1789
- Website: 2emedanger.com

Franck Rivoire, better known by his stage name Danger, is a French electronic musician.

== Biography ==
=== History ===
Rivoire's musical history started at an early age, when his parents introduced him to the piano and saxophone. Growing up, he played in both jazz and punk bands, and other interests included skateboarding and metal music. Rivoire got his first synthesizer after seeing a friend use one and convincing his parents to buy one for him, too. His interest in electronic music was pursued further when he began using Amiga and Atari computers to make chiptunes, a hobby that he still practices.

Before he started using the name "Danger", Rivoire trained to be a graphic designer and worked as one professionally. When not working, he practiced digital music production. His track "11h30" was created during this time and contains his own vocals, but no lyrics; the vocals instead consist of mixed-up syllables.

In an effort to modernize the sound of his music, Rivoire created some new electro-influenced tracks and uploaded them onto MySpace under the name Danger. He chose the moniker because he had previously used it for online chat clients and believed he would get free advertising as "danger" is such a commonly used word. In 2007, he signed to the label Ekler'o'shock because he enjoyed the music of its other artists such as DatA. There have since been four Danger EP's released on Ekler'o'shock as well as a number of remixes released both officially and otherwise.

In 2013, the French music blog Stop the Noise published 70+ leaked demos ranging from 2005–2007 in an article titled in French: "LEVEL0: Discover the Danger demos from 2005 to 2007." Some of the tracks included the original version of 1:30 titled 15:59 as well as 13:40, an unreleased remix of the Masterboy song Feel the Heat of the Night. The blog immediately took the article down out of respect for Danger and the label Ekler'o'shock.

In June 2014, Danger unveiled a new side project, Sunset, playing live at Parisian nightclub, Nouveau Casino.

On 3 June 2016 Danger posted a link via Facebook to a Bandcamp page titled "6:24". The song was used for the video game Furi in which Danger contributed a total of five songs. The full OST was released on 5 July 2016.

On 7 November 2016 Danger announced his new album 太鼓 (taiko) for his 10-year anniversary. In an interview with Nest HQ, Danger mentions that "太鼓 is loaded with childhood feelings and many emotions that were almost absent from my past releases." The album is a hybrid of eastern and western music between 80's retro and more contemporary sounds.

In November 2016, Danger was featured as an opening act for Porter Robinson and Madeon's Shelter Live Tour.

On 9 May 2017, Danger announced that his album 太鼓 (taiko) would be released on 2 June 2017.

On 22 December 2018, Danger announced that his second album, Origins, would be released on 18 January 2019.

In 2020, Danger created the original score for Haven, a role-playing video game developed by The Game Bakers. The soundtrack was released on 3 December 2020 as "Haven (Original Soundtrack)."

In 2024, he provided the soundtrack for another video game, Windblown, developed by Motion Twin. The soundtrack was released on Steam on 24 October 2024. It was then released on streaming services on 13 December 2024.

=== Idiosyncrasies ===
Each Danger EP is named after a specific date in time, beginning with 09/14 2007 (14 September 2007), named after the day he finished the EP. These EPs have not been released in chronological order; in fact, "EPII" was at one point teased on his MySpace page despite the release of his second and third EPs, 09/16 2007 and 09/17 2007 which he refers to as EPIII and EPIV, respectively. This strange chronology is a reference to that of the Star Wars film series.

Danger's tracks are often named after times of day — "11h30" being the French representation for 11:30, was named after the time of day it was completed. The title of the track "88:88" is a reference to an LCD clock which is not plugged in.

Another unique characteristic to Danger's persona is the black mask which he wears during nearly all of his public appearances. It is inspired by both the band Daft Punk and the Black Mage character from the video game series Final Fantasy. He claims to wear the mask in order to differentiate between his shy "geeky" self and the persona he takes on-stage while performing.

Rivoire has also mentioned that the background of his MySpace page included an intense strobe effect as a reference to the Pokémon episode Electric Soldier Porygon, and joked that he thought it would be funny if someone got an epileptic attack from it, saying, "especially if they have a fast PC it adds a bit of insult to the injury." The background ceased to strobe in 2013 after Myspace redesigned their platform.

== Discography ==
=== Albums ===
Year	Title	Tracks
2017	太鼓 (Taiko)	"1789 Records"
2017	太鼓 (Taiko)	"7:17"
2017	太鼓 (Taiko)	"11:02"
2017	太鼓 (Taiko)	"11:03"
2017	太鼓 (Taiko)	"22:41"
2017	太鼓 (Taiko)	"19:00 feat. Tasha The Amazon"
2017	太鼓 (Taiko)	"9:00"
2017	太鼓 (Taiko)	"6:42"
2017	太鼓 (Taiko)	"10:00"
2017	太鼓 (Taiko)	"0:59"
2017	太鼓 (Taiko)	"11:50 feat. Lil Brain"
2017	太鼓 (Taiko)	"21:10"
2017	太鼓 (Taiko)	"19:19"
2017	太鼓 (Taiko)	"8:10"
2017	太鼓 (Taiko)	"3:00"
2019	Origins	"9:20 Intro"
2019	Origins	"9:20"
2019	Origins	"22:01"
2019	Origins	"11:17"
2019	Origins	"0:46"
2019	Origins	"16:03"
2019	Origins	"16:56"
2019	Origins	"6:03"
2019	Origins	"88:88 Intro"
2019	Origins	"88:88 Stage 3 the Club"
2019	Origins	"9:19"
2019	Origins	"22:39 Intro"
2019	Origins	"22:39"
2019	Origins	"13:13"
2019	Origins	"13:12"
2019	Origins	"23:05"
2020	Haven Original Soundtrack	"04:42 Still Free"
2020	Haven Original Soundtrack	"07:41 The Beginning of Something"
2020	Haven Original Soundtrack	"08:16 Home"
2020	Haven Original Soundtrack	"10:27 Appledew Stew"
2020	Haven Original Soundtrack	"11:18 Move It Muffin!"
2020	Haven Original Soundtrack	"13:39 Source"
2020	Haven Original Soundtrack	"14:52 Ready When You Are!"
2020	Haven Original Soundtrack	"15:23 We Can Always Pretend"
2020	Haven Original Soundtrack	"16:43 Blooting Hornets"
2020	Haven Original Soundtrack	"17:09 I Can't Stay Mad at You"
2020	Haven Original Soundtrack	"19:02 Kusa Makura"
2020	Haven Original Soundtrack	"20:06 Millions of Lumsecs Away"
2020	Haven Original Soundtrack	"21:01 Sweet Insomnia"
2020	Haven Original Soundtrack	"22:12 Until the End of Time"
2020	Haven Original Soundtrack	"23:49 Do We Glow Too?"
2020	Haven Original Soundtrack	"00:21 Nothing but Rust"
2020	Haven Original Soundtrack	"01:53 Now or Never"
2020	Haven Original Soundtrack	"03:20 Free Fall"
2020	Haven Original Soundtrack	"05:12 Space Caress"
2024	Windblown Original Soundtrack	"11:50 Wild Eyes"
2024	Windblown Original Soundtrack	"11:50 Wild Eyes (Trailer Version)"
2024	Windblown Original Soundtrack	"10:07 Broken Breeze"
2024	Windblown Original Soundtrack	"6:34 Golem Gardens"
2024	Windblown Original Soundtrack	"11:45 The Ark"
2024	Windblown Original Soundtrack	"11:15 Steel Orphans"
2024	Windblown Original Soundtrack	"9:22 Bully Ballad"
2024	Windblown Original Soundtrack	"9:10 Eternal Feast"
2024	Windblown Original Soundtrack	"7:16 Nowhere Woods"
2024	Windblown Original Soundtrack	"0:05 Reborn For You"
2024	Windblown Original Soundtrack	"3:18 Navelless Family"
2024	Windblown Original Soundtrack	"8:58 Vortex Prelude (Trailer Version)"
2024	Windblown Original Soundtrack	"9:47 One Day (Trailer Version)"
2024	Windblown Original Soundtrack	"9:49 Leapers (Trailer Version)"

=== EPs ===
Year	Title	Tracks
2007	09/14 2007	"11h30"
2007	09/14 2007	"11h30 (DatA Remix)"
2007	09/14 2007	"14h54"
2007	09/14 2007	"19h11"
2009	09/16 2007	"88:88"
2009	09/16 2007	"00:01 feat. Vyle"
2009	09/16 2007	"07:46"
2009	09/16 2007	"88:88 (EAT Remix)"
2009	09/16 2007	"88:88 (80kidz Remix)"
2010	09/17 2007	"4h30"
2010	09/17 2007	"3h11"
2010	09/17 2007	"3h16"
2010	09/17 2007	"4h30 (Riot Kid Remix)"
2010	09/17 2007	"4h30 (Oliver $ Remix)"
2014	July 2013	"1:09"
2014	July 2013	"1:13"
2014	July 2013	"1:30"
2014	July 2013	"1:42"

=== Remixes ===
Year	Track	Artist
2007	"Revolte at 22h10" (Credited as an original Danger track; a remix of "Weak Generation")	Revolte
2008	"American Boy (Danger Remix)" (An instrumental version called "Armageddon Boy" can also be found)	Estelle feat. Kanye West
2008	"Chick Lit (Danger TV Remix)"	We Are Scientists
2008	"Into the Galaxy (Danger Remix)"	Midnight Juggernauts
2008	"My Way (Danger Remix)"	Starskee
2008	"Divine (Danger Remix)"	Sebastien Tellier
2008	"Love Juice (Danger TV Remix)"	SymbolOne
2008	"Give It All You Got (Danger Beach Remix)"	Lil Jon ft. Kee
2008	"Ne.Oh!.Pen (Danger Remix)" (Remix of "Oh!")	Boys Noize
2009	"Walking On A Dream (Danger Racing Remix)"	Empire Of The Sun
2009	"Drown In The Now feat. Matisyahu (Danger Spy Remix)"	The Crystal Method
2009	"All The Right Moves (Danger Remix)"	OneRepublic
2010	"Imma Be (Danger Olympic Remix)"	The Black Eyed Peas
2010	"Acid Washed (Danger Remix)"	Acid Washed
2010	"In For The Kill (Danger Ocean Remix)"	La Roux
2010	"Me & You (Danger Remix)"	Nero
2011	"In Doubt feat. CocknBullKid (Danger Remix)"	Black Devil Disco Club
2012	"Douce Nuit (Danger Remix)"	Alexandre Chatelard
2020	"Become One (Danger Rework)"	Lil Brain

=== Other Tracks ===
- "9:19", released on Ekler'o'shock's EOS MMX - The Summer Solstice Edition One and later on Origins
- "9h20", made in 2007 and available online and later on Origins
- "12h38", a track used in "The Big Purple Van Club" video performance by Danger in 2008
- "13h12 (Live Edit)", a track that has been ripped twice from Danger's live sets: once without the full intro and once without the full ending
- "13h40", said to be made in 2007 or 2008 but never officially released and containing a sample of Masterboy's "Feel the Heat of the Night"
- "22h39", released on Ekler'o'shock's EOS MMX - The Summer Solstice Edition Two
- Attraction soundtrack, music for a lengthy Japanese/French interactive anti-smoking ad/animation directed by Koji Morimoto
- "6:24", "7:53", "8:02", "19:06", and "19:07" make up part of the soundtrack for the video game Furi.
- 2018 Mid-Season Invitational Theme for the League of Legends Mid Season Invitational
