= Hyena (disambiguation) =

A hyena is a cat-like carnivoran mammal.

Hyena, Hyaena or Hyenas may also refer to:

== Arts and entertainment ==
=== Fictional characters ===
- The Hyena (Boner's Ark), from the comic strip Boner's Ark
- Hyena (comics), two villains in the DC Comics universe
- Hyena (Gargoyles), from the Disney cartoon Gargoyles (1994–96)
- Hyena (The King of Fighters: Maximum Impact), in the 2004 fighting video game The King of Fighters: Maximum Impact

=== Film and television ===
- Hyenas (1992 film), also Hyènes, Senegalese film by Djibril Diop Mambéty based on Dürrenmatt's "Besuch der alten Dame"
- Hyenas (2011 film), a supernatural horror film, written and directed by Eric Weston
- Hyena (film), a British film
- Hyena Filmproduktion, a film company founded by Monika Treut and Elfi Mikesch in 1984
- Hyena (TV series), a 2020 South Korean legal drama television series
- La hiena (The Hyena), 1971 Mexican telenovela

=== Literature ===
- "The Hyena" (short story), 1962 short story by Paul Bowles
- "The Hyena", 1928 short story by Robert E. Howard

=== Music ===
- Hyæna, 1984, by Siouxsie and the Banshees
- Hyëna, 2022, by KMFDM
- "Hyaena" (song), 2023, by Travis Scott
- "Hyena" (song), 2007, by The Gazette
- Hyena (soundtrack), of 2006 South Korean television series Hyena
- Hyena, 2014, by Red Snapper
- Hyena Records, a label founded by jazz and R&B producer Joel Dorn
- "Hyena", a song by R.E.M. from the 1986 album Lifes Rich Pageant
- "Hyenas", a song by Noisia from the 2014 compilation album FabricLive.76

=== Video games ===
- Hyenas (video game), a cancelled first-person shooter

== Military ==
- HMS Hyaena, four ships of the Royal Navy
- de Havilland Hyena, a prototype British army co-operation aircraft of the 1920s
- Armstrong Siddeley Hyena, a British aero engine developed by Armstrong Siddeley in the 1930s

== People ==
- Hyena (music producer), or Andreas Söderlund (fl. since 2003), a Swedish songwriter
- Hyena, a Malawian occupation providing sexual cleansing
- Jorge Rodrigo Barrios (born 1976), Argentine junior lightweight boxer known as La Hiena (The Hyena)
- Julius Jacob von Haynau (1786–1853), Austrian general known as "The Hyena of Brescia"
- Seo Hye-na, also known as Ida Daussy, a French-born South Korean broadcaster

== Other uses ==
- Hyaena, the striped hyena
- Lancia Hyena, a small sports car introduced in 1992

== See also ==
- Iota Draconis, a star in the constellation Draco also known as "Al dhili" (male hyena, in Arabic)
- Le Iene (The Hyenas), a television program broadcast on the Italian channel Italia 1 that began in 1996
