= Cairn (video game) =

2026 video game

- Developer: The Game Bakers
- Publisher: The Game Bakers
- Director: Emeric Thoa
- Designer: Audrey Leprince
- Artist: Mathieu Bablet
- Writer: Mathieu Bablet
- Composers: Martin Stig Andersen; Gildaa; The Toxic Avenger
- Platforms: PlayStation 5; Windows; Nintendo Switch 2
- Release: PS5, Windows; 29 January 2026; Nintendo Switch 2 Early 2027
- Genres: Simulation, adventure
- Mode: Single-player

Cairn is a 2026 simulation adventure video game developed and published by The Game Bakers. Players control Aava, a professional mountaineer who seeks to summit the mysterious Mount Kami. While her journey is mostly solitary, she encounters other climbers and inhabitants on the mountain and uncovers remnants of past expeditions along with a long-lost civilization. As a simulation game, players manually control each of Aava's limbs. The game also features elements commonly found in survival games, with players being tasked with managing Aava's hunger, thirst, and temperature. It also features a weather system and a day-night cycle, both of which affect gameplay difficulty.

Development of the game started in 2020. Emeric Thoa served as its creative director, while comic book artist Mathieu Bablet was its art director and lead writer, and Martin Stig Andersen was its audio designer and co-composer. The Game Bakers described the game as a conclusion to its "trilogy on freedom", following Furi and Haven. The development team was inspired by climbing documentaries and the manga series The Summit of the Gods. They also consulted alpinists and visited Aiguille du Midi to learn about mountaineering. While The Game Bakers described it as a "survival climber" and compared Mount Kami to a long boss fight, the game was not designed to be punishing, with the team introducing various accessibility options. The game had a budget of €5 million.

Announced in June 2024, the game was released on 29 January 2026 for PlayStation 5 and Windows. The game received generally positive reviews, with critics praising its simulation gameplay, story, and art direction, though Aava's characterization and the game's technical issues were criticized. The game sold over 200,000 copies in three days. The Game Bakers planned to support the game with free downloadable content packs under the banner "On the Trail", with the first update, "Deep Water", set to be released in mid 2026. A Nintendo Switch 2 version is scheduled for 2027.

== Gameplay ==
In Cairn, players must manually position the limbs of a mountaineer as she attempts to summit a mountain.

Cairn is a rock climbing simulation video game played from a third-person perspective. In the game, the player assumes control of Aava, a professional mountaineer who aspires to become the first person to reach the summit of the fictional Mount Kami.

As Aava, players are tasked with reading the rock face and charting out their climbing routes. There are multiple pathways for players to reach the top. Players must manually position each of Aava's limbs on handholds and footholds as she climbs up the mountain. The game automatically selects which limb to move by default, though players can override this with manual control at any time. Pitons, which catch Aava when she falls, function as the game's checkpoints, and chalk can increase Aava's grip. Players have to be aware of Aava's posture and manage her stamina. If Aava is placed in an uncomfortable position for a sustained period, overextending or overexerting one limb, she may fall, partially resetting the player's progress. Players must observe Aava to gauge her level of exhaustion. If she is under extreme stress, she will breathe heavily and her limbs will tremble. Players can shake one of Aava's tired limbs or belay off a piton to regain some stamina. Aava's body language will also inform players that a hold is large enough for her to grab. Weather, time of day, and the composition of the rock wall will also alter the difficulty of an ascent. For instance, strong wind will disrupt Aava's balance, and heavy rain will cause rock faces to become slippery, while nighttime significantly lowers visibility.

The game also features elements from survival games, as Aava needs to rest, eat, and drink to lower hunger and thirst. At regular intervals, players can rest at a bivouac shelter, which serves as a save point. It is a place where Aava can rest, bandage herself, cook food, and repair equipment. She is also accompanied by a robot named Climbot, which can recycle pitons and make new chalk for Aava. Aava has a backpack with a limited amount of space that she can use to store survival resources that she finds while exploring. Players also discover side objectives by collecting maps and letters, prompting them to explore optional areas to look for collectibles. As Aava progresses, she will gain new items and upgrades, such as indestructible pitons and a pinwheel, as well as additional recipes for food.

Cairn is also an adventure game. Aava will uncover the hidden mysteries of the mountain and determine what sacrifices she must be willing to make in order to realize her deepest ambition. She will encounter other climbers attempting to summit the mountain, discover remnants of past expeditions and a long-lost troglodyte civilization. Her friends also leave messages for her through her Climbot. Through interactions with these non-playable characters and visiting locations of interest, players will understand more about Aava's motivations and background. Besides the story mode, the game also features a mode named Expedition, in which players can choose their playable avatar (Aava or Marco), select their climbing style (alpine or free solo), and share their results with other players. The game was also released with several accessibility options that make the experience easier. For instance, players can toggle "rewind", allowing them to turn back time before Aava falls. Players can also activate assist mode, which turns off all survival needs and increases the frequency of autosaves.

== Development ==
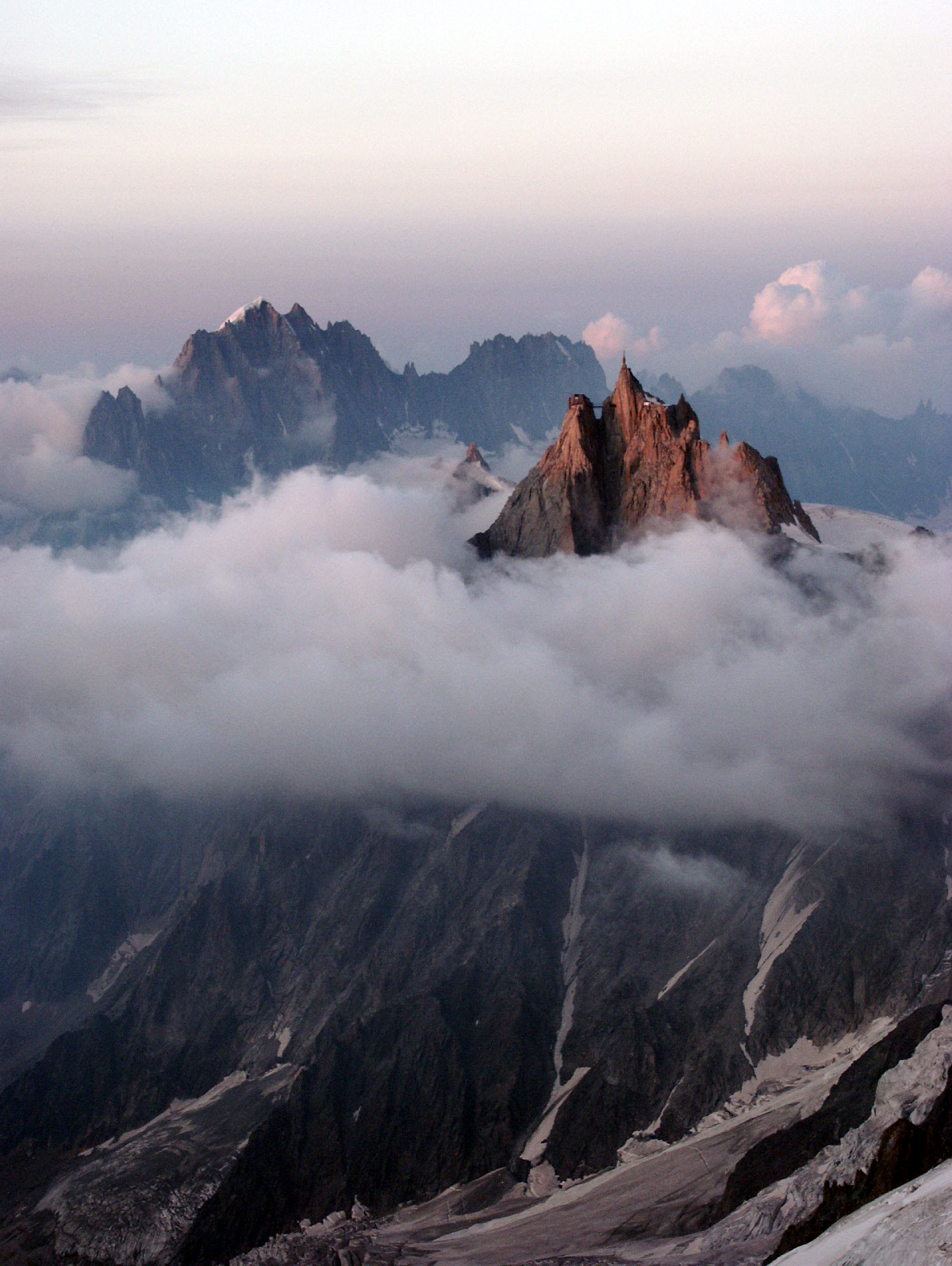
To prepare for the game's development and understand more about mountaineering, the team visited the Aiguille du Midi in the Mont Blanc massif.

Cairn was developed by The Game Bakers. Development of the game started in 2020, and involved a team of 25 people. Emeric Thoa served as its creative director, while comic book artist Mathieu Bablet served as lead writer and art director.. It had a budget of €5 million.

Cairn was described by the team as the conclusion of their "trilogy on freedom", following Furi and Haven. Thoa felt that alpinism stories captured a sense of "absolute freedom", and that Cairn was "a reflection on mountaineering itself, on what drives people to push themselves beyond their limits to climb mountains". Thoa was inspired by climbing documentaries and the manga The Summit of the Gods while creating the game. The game also explores the dangers and isolation associated with mountaineering. The team also found several similarities between playing a video game and mountaineering, as both had clearly defined rules and "instinctive success and failure consequences". The Game Bakers wanted the story to be "moving". Bablet described Aava as an individual who is demanding, a perfectionist, and highly disciplined, though her attachment to her ambitions sometimes inflicts a heavy toll on the surrounding people. Several side characters were introduced to reveal Aava's background and personal history. The team spent three years consulting alpinist Élisabeth Revol and Chamonix mountain guide Loan Giroud, who shared their mountaineering experience with the team. Mount Kami was inspired by the Himalayas, the Alps, and the Vercors Massif, and the team also attempted to ascend Aiguille du Midi themselves to know more about the mountineering.

The Game Bakers described the game as a "survival climber". They compared summiting the game's mountain to a persistent boss battle, in which players use their skills and manage their resources in order to conquer it. Since the core theme of the game is freedom, players may chart their own path while climbing. The game initially did not have any save points, and the player character would die permanently if they fell, though they decided not to incorporate this idea after realizing that this increased difficulty would not appeal to all players, and instead turned it into a side mode. The team compared it to Death Stranding and the Dark Souls series, though Thoa stressed Cairn was not designed to induce rage, and that the game was designed to encourage players to persevere and come back from failure. Thoa further added that Cairn was about putting effort into conquering insurmountable odds and that players are encouraged to try, learn, and improve. To prevent players from being overwhelmed at the beginning of the game, the team also added many accessibility features. Each rock face and its handholds are handcrafted by the team. Thoa added that creating the game's mechanics was challenging, as the climbing movements were determined in real time using game physics and mathematical algorithms, meaning that a small adjustment to the level would bring about a cascade of other changes to other areas. The team took over three years to create and refine the climbing simulation.

The team collaborated with Lukas Julian Lentz and Martin Stig Andersen for Cairn's audio. Andersen, alongside French DJ The Toxic Avenger and Franco-Brazilian singer Gildaa, composed the game's soundtrack. Gildaa also recorded the sounds made by Aava while she is climbing, including her breathing and screaming sounds. The team felt that screaming was a signature feature of mountaineering and that it helped create a "shared feeling of exasperation" between players and Aava. To create a contrast between the serenity of nature and the intensity of rock climbing, the audio team implemented a dynamic system called "mountain intimidation", which shifts the soundscape based on players' camera angle. Music plays primarily while players explore Mount Kami in safety; the team used these melodic cues to reinforce emotional moments without distracting players during the intensity of a climb. Sophia Eleni provided the voice for Aava, and Hyoie O’Grady, Adam Howden, Aaron Neil, Rebecca Benson, Alexandra Boulton, and Rich Keeble were featured in supporting roles.

=== Release ===
The Game Bakers announced Cairn for PlayStation 5 and Windows during the Summer Game Fest in June 2024. A time-limited demo for the game was released through Steam in December 2024. More than 600,000 players tried the demo as of October 2025. The game was originally planned to be released on 5 November 2025, but it was delayed to 29 January 2026.

The Game Bakers planned to support the game with a series of free downloadable content packs named "On the Trail", which sees the player character following the trail of a famous mountaineer. The first update, titled Deep Water, was released on 13 August 2026. It adds three new climbing locations, and introduces the option for players to play as Marco.

== Reception ==
Reception

Aggregate scores
Aggregator	Score
Metacritic	(PC) 85/100 (PS5) 83/100
OpenCritic	93% recommend (Note: Based on 100 reviews)

Review scores
Publication	Score
Game Informer	9.25/10
GameSpot	9/10
GamesRadar+	3.5/5
IGN	9/10
PC Gamer (US)	91/100
PCMag	4/5
Push Square	7/10
Shacknews	9/10
TechRadar	4/5
The Guardian	4/5

Cairn received "generally favorable" reviews, according to review aggregator website Metacritic. Fellow review aggregator OpenCritic assessed that the game received "mighty" approval, being recommended by 93% of critics.

Will Borger from IGN wrote that summiting Kami was an "exhilarating" and "rewarding" experience, noting that players need to manage Aava's health and stamina, as well as her hunger and temperature, to succeed. Keza MacDonald from The Guardian wrote that Cairn is a "punishing, beautiful survival game that turns mountaineering into an intimate test of endurance, fixation and emotional resolve". She felt that climbing the mountain was a tense experience, and reaching a safe point provided relief that was "intoxicating". Matt Miller from Game Informer compared Mount Kami to a massive puzzle and a long boss fight, and praised the game for having many alternative paths for players to reach their objectives. Lewis Gordon from Eurogamer wrote that Cairn and Baby Steps, as opposed to combat-heavy games, provided a "kinder, more generous masocore" experience where arduous, incremental progress still yields euphoric satisfaction. Several critics remarked that the game had successfully captured the joy and the thrills of rock climbing. In a more negative review, Ali Jones from GamesRadar criticized the climbing mechanics for being "clumsy".

The art direction and music were praised for elevating the gameplay. Zackery Cuevas from PCMag wrote that the game was "visually striking", commending how its stylized art is used to depict natural scenery. Several critics remarked that the game had a strong sense of place, noting that it is filled with unique locations of interest and stunning vistas. Shaun Prescott from PC Gamer described Cairn as "a game of strange encounters", noting its "surreal" and "meditative" qualities. Chance Townsend from Mashable, while praising the art direction by comparing it to graphic novels and minimalist animated films, criticized the climbing animations for being awkward at times, thus breaking players' immersion. Several reviewers also criticized the game's technical issues.

The game's story received strong praise from critics. James Pickard from TechRadar commented that the story was well-written and that its characters were "compelling". Borger noted that the game's environmental storytelling was "moving" and remarked that the stories "recur and build on themselves" as players progress. Several critics praised the game's themes and how it explored the consequences of chasing ambitions and the human cost of mountaineering, and noted that it had a very memorable ending. Oli Welsh from Polygon added that the game had "interesting" pacing, praising how it balanced sections with difficult gameplay and more relaxed exploration. Some noted that the challenging gameplay further elevated the game's story and its messages. Townsend, however, felt that the narrative was "sparse". The character of Aava received a mixed response. Borger described Aava as a "complicated, complex, imperfect" character, while Moises Taveras from GameSpot also praised Aava for being a person with "real struggles and a real lack of answers". However, Jones called her "unrealistic" and "unsympathetic", while Stephen Tailby from Push Square criticized Aava's confrontational attitude towards other characters throughout the game, which resulted in a narrative that felt "frustrating".

=== Sales ===
The Game Bakers estimated that the game would sell between 300,000 and 1 million units in its first year of sales. Over 200,000 copies were sold within the first three days of its launch. The game sold more than 300,000 copies a week after launch.

=== Awards ===
Year	Award	Category	Result	Ref.
2026	Develop:Star Awards 2026	Best Game Design	Nominated	
2026	Golden Joystick Awards	Best Game Trailer ("Launch Trailer")	Nominated	
2026	Golden Joystick Awards	Best Indie Game — Self-Published	Nominated	
2026	The Game Awards 2026	Best Independent Game	Pending	
2026	The Game Awards 2026	Games for Impact	Pending	
