= Mathieu Bablet =

French comics artist (born 1987)

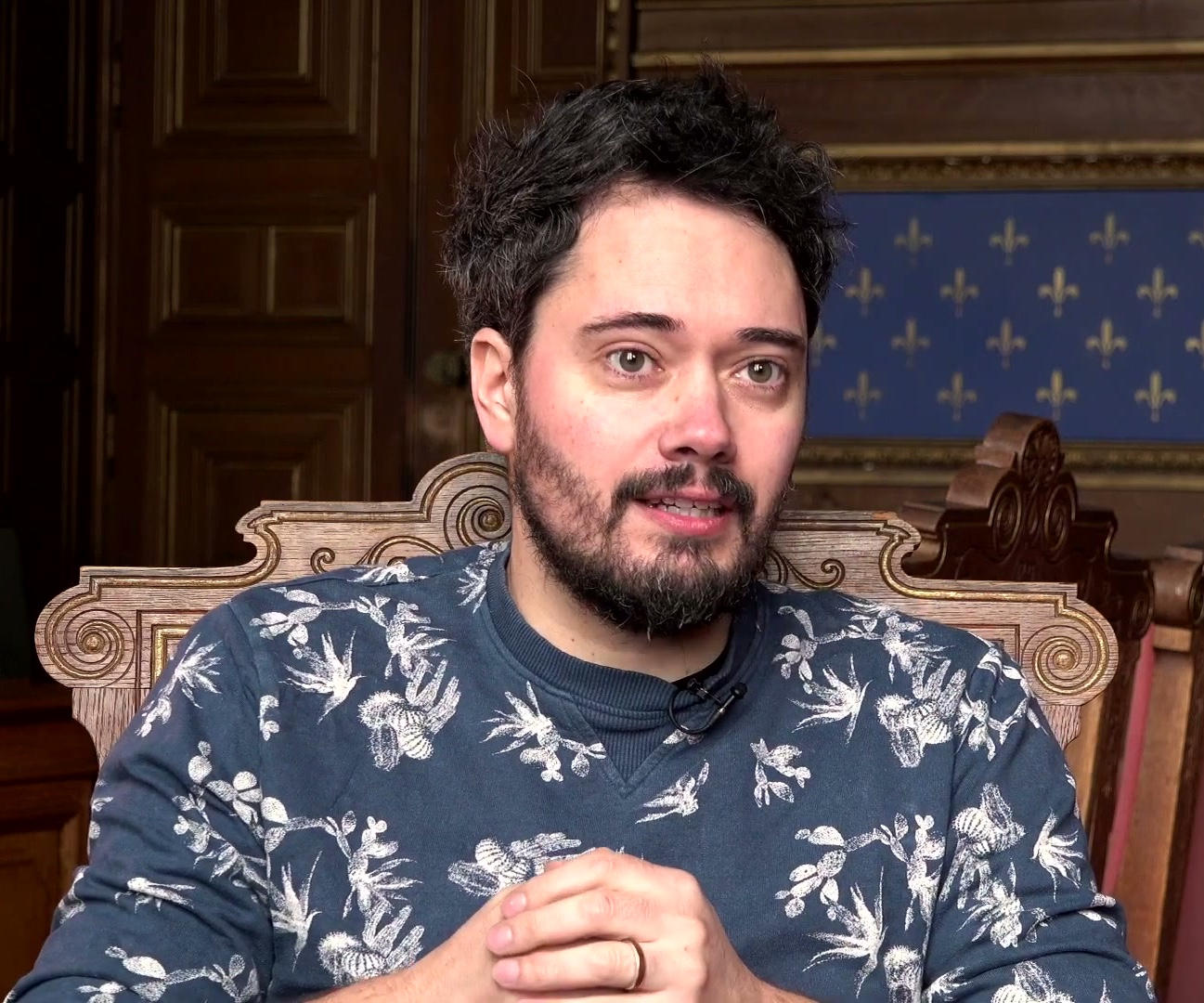
- Bablet in 2023
- Born: 9 January 1987 (age 39) France
- Areas: Writer, Artist

Mathieu Bablet (born 9 January 1987) is a French comics creator. His works include the Greek mythology-inspired comic Adrastea (2013–2014) and the science fiction comics Shangri-La (2016) Carbon & Silicon (2020) and Silent Jenny (2025). Alongside his work on Silent Jenny, he also worked as art director and writer on the video game Cairn, by French studio The Game Bakers. It was released in 2026 for PlayStation 5 and Windows PC. A Nintendo Switch 2 edition has been announced for the following year. Bablet places himself within a tradition where science-fiction writers create visions of the future in order to question current social issues.
