= Schleh =

Schleh is a surname. Notable people with the surname include:

- Hedwig Schleh (1831–1919), German Jewish-Christian actress, feminist, and author
- Jack Schleh, director of the first color cartoon Colonel Bleep
- Tommy Schleh (born 1964), German DJ
