= Land of Dreaming =

1996 single by Masterboy

Single by Masterboy

from the album Generation of Love
- Released: 3 January 1996
- Genre: Eurodance
- Length: 4:03
- Label: Club Zone
- Songwriters: Enrico Zabler; Tommy Schleh; Beatrice Obrecht
- Producer: Masterboy

Masterboy singles chronology
"Anybody (Movin' On)" (1995)	"Land of Dreaming" (1996)	"Show Me Colours" (1996)

Music video
- "Land of Dreaming" on YouTube

"Land of Dreaming" is a song recorded by German band Masterboy, released in January 1996, by label Club Zone, as the third single from their fourth album, Generation of Love (1995). The song is written by band members Enrico Zabler, Tommy Schleh, and Beatrice Obrecht, and features female vocals performed by Trixi Delgado. Several remixes were produced for the various formats, two of them were mixed by Italian Eurodance act Cappella.

The song reached number 12 in Germany and charted for 17 weeks. It was also a top-20 hit in Switzerland, Finland and the Netherlands. In France, the song was ranked for ten weeks in the French top-50 Singles Chart and reached number 22. On the Eurochart Hot 100, "Land of Dreaming" peaked at number 42. In 2006, it was re-recorded in a remixed version with Freedom Williams and Linda Rocco in featuring and this version is included on Masterboy's 2006 studio album US-Album.

== Critical reception ==
British magazine Music Week gave the song a score of three out of five, adding, "The German techno outfit mellow out on a reggae-lite tune but show their true colours on an uplifting Cappella remix."

== Music video ==
The music video for "Land of Dreaming" was directed by Jonathan Bate and was shot in Sierra Nevada, Spain in January 1996 Bate also directed the music video of "Generation of Love".

== Track listings ==
- CD maxi
1. "Land of Dreaming" (radio edit – gospel mix) – 3:34
2. "Land of Dreaming" (gospel club mix) – 5:10
3. "Land of Dreaming" (night club mix) – 6:08
4. "Land of Dreaming" (album club mix) – 5:15
5. "Land of Dreaming" (instrumental gospel mix) – 3:34
6. "Land of Dreaming" (radio edit – night mix) – 3:57
- CD single
1. "Land of Dreaming" (radio edit – gospel mix) – 3:34
2. "Land of Dreaming" (night club mix) – 5:10
- 12-inch maxi
1. "Land of Dreaming" (album club mix) – 5:15
2. "Land of Dreaming" (gospel club mix) – 5:10
- 12-inch maxi – U.S.
1. "Land of Dreaming" (extended mix) – 6:28
2. "Land of Dreaming" (land of dub) – 7:32
3. "Land of Dreaming" (dream dub) – 7:52
4. "Land of Dreaming" (beats) – 1:55
5. "Land of Dreaming" (radio mix) – 4:06
- CD maxi – Remixes
1. "Land of Dreaming" (radio acoustic edit) – 3:14
2. "Land of Dreaming" (radio U.S. mix) – 3:49
3. "Land of Dreaming" (unit house mix) – 4:59
4. "Land of Dreaming" (U.S. mix) – 4:58
5. "Land of Dreaming" (unit house rapless mix) – 5:13
6. "Land of Dreaming" (Cappella club mix) – 6:08
7. "Land of Dreaming" (Cappella T.S.O.B. mix – the sound of Brescia) – 5:42
- 12-inch maxi – Remixes
1. "Land of Dreaming" (Cappella club mix) – 6:08
2. "Land of Dreaming" (Cappella T.S.O.B. mix – the sound of Brescia) – 5:42
3. "Land of Dreaming" (unit house rapless mix) – 5:13
4. "Land of Dreaming" (night club mix) – 6:08

== Credits ==
- Lyrics by Zabler, Skywalker and Schleh
- Music by Obrecht, Zabler and Schleh
- Mastered by J. Quincy Kramer
- Mixed by TTT
- Art direction by Polygram Creative Services
- Cover painting by Peter Mackens
- Sleeve design by Session Music Group
- Produced by Masterboy Beat Production
- Remixes by Misar and Uwe Wagenknecht (night club mix), Unit Production (unit house rapless mix), Masterboy Beat Production, Cappella

== Charts ==
=== Weekly charts ===
Chart (1996)	Peak position
Austria (Ö3 Austria Top 40)	26
Estonia (Eesti Top 20)	9
Europe (Eurochart Hot 100)	42
Finland (Suomen virallinen lista)	15
France (SNEP)	22
Germany (GfK)	12
Netherlands (Dutch Top 40)	22
Netherlands (Single Top 100)	19
Sweden (Sverigetopplistan)	32
Switzerland (Schweizer Hitparade)	20

=== Year-end charts ===
Chart (1996)	Position
Germany (Media Control)	80
