= Show Me Colours =

Single by Masterboy

from the album Colours
- B-side: "Remix"
- Released: 7 October 1996
- Recorded: 1996
- Length: 3:33
- Label: Polydor; Club Zone (Germany); PolyGram Iberica (Spain); Mercury (Japan)
- Songwriters: Enrico Zabler; Tommy Schleh; Luke Skywalker
- Producer: Masterboy

Masterboy singles chronology
"Land of Dreaming" (1996)	"Show Me Colours" (1996)	"Just For You" (1996)

Music video
- "Show Me Colours" on YouTube

"Show Me Colours" is a song by German Eurodance band Masterboy, released via various labels in October 1996, as the second single from their fifth album, Colours (1996). The song became a top-10 hit in the Czech Republic, Finland and Mexico, and it was also a top-30 hit in Austria and Germany. On the Eurochart Hot 100, it peaked at number 75. The vocals are sung by American singer Linda Rocco.

== Critical reception ==
Pan-European magazine Music & Media wrote about the song, "This sneak preview from the upcoming album Colours promises high paced, high quality dance. The fast beats and exciting melodies whip the listener up into a frenzy. Don't expect any heavy club stuff, though. This is purely radio-oriented dance material."

== Music video ==
The music video for "Show Me Colours" was directed by Jonathan Bate. Bate had previously directed the music videos for "Generation of Love" and "Land of Dreaming". The video features lead vocalist Linda Rocco.

== Track listings ==
- CD maxi
1. "Show Me Colours" (Radio Edit) - 3:33
2. "Show Me Colours" (Maxi Mix) - 6:06
3. "Show Me Colours" (B-Side Mix) - 6:19
- CD maxi - Remixes
1. "Show Me Colours" (Good Friends Single Mix) - 3:48
2. "Show Me Colours" (Good Friends Instrumental Mix) - 6:10
3. "Show Me Colours" (Big Club Mix) - 6:15
4. "Show Me Colours" (Good Friends Vocal Mix) - 6:10

== Charts ==
Chart (1996–1997)	Peak position
Austria (Ö3 Austria Top 40)	23
Czech Republic (IFPI CR)	10
Europe (Eurochart Hot 100)	75
Finland (Suomen virallinen lista)	10
France (SNEP)	31
Germany (GfK)	24
Mexico (Notitas Musicales)	3
Sweden (Sverigetopplistan)	44
Switzerland (Schweizer Hitparade)	42
