= Love Message (song) =

1996 song

"Love Message" is a song created by Scooter, Masterboy, E-Rotic, Mr. President, Fun Factory, Worlds Apart and U96 in 1996 as a message about preventing the spread of AIDS.

It was released as a 12" single on Polydor's Club Zone label. It charted in Germany at No. 4, in Finland at No. 9, in Austria and Switzerland at No. 12 and in Sweden at No. 46.

In 2005, one of the song's producers, Klubbingman (Tommy Schleh) of Masterboy Beat Production, featuring Trixi Delgado on vocals (also of the group Masterboy) released their version which charted at No. 96 in Germany.

The song appears on DMA Dance: Eurodance Vol. 2.

== Track listing ==
12" maxi

1. "Love Message" (United Maxi Mix) – 6:06
2. "Love Message" (Vocal Dub Mix) – 6:05
3. "Love Message" (Single Edit) – 3:47
