= Squids (video game) =

2011 video game

- Developer: The Game Bakers
- Composer: Romain Gauthier
- Platform: iOS
- Release: October 2011
- Genre: Tactical role-playing
- Mode: Single-player

Squids is a tactical role-playing game by the French studio The Game Bakers, released in October 2011 for iOS devices. A sequel was released entitled Squids Wild West, and a spin-off called Squids Odyssey was also released.

== Gameplay ==
The objective of the game is to defeat a range of aquatic enemies with a party of up to four anthropomorphic squids, which belong to one of four character classes: stomper (melee fighter), shooter (ranged fighter), scout, or healer. Combat is turn-based, but not grid-bound: squids are flicked across the playing field by a motion of the player's finger, bumping like billiard balls into enemies to attack them. In between the linear (but replayable) levels, which are interconnected by cutscenes that develop the game's story, players can level up their squids or enhance them with items that can be bought with pearls, which in turn are found in-game or available to purchase for real currency.

== Reception ==
Reception

Aggregate score
Aggregator	Score
Metacritic	77%

The game was well received upon its release, receiving an aggregated score of 77% on Metacritic by February 2012. Gamezebo praised the game's "pitch-perfect" gameplay, graphics, and sound. TouchArcade appreciated the game's "inventive, grid-less, and active" combat mechanic, but criticized the ability to purchase pearls as unbalancing. Edge and PocketGamer likewise approved of the game's gameplay and production values but criticized the inclusion of in-game purchases.

== Sequels ==
=== Squids Wild West ===
Squids Wild West is an adventure iOS game developed by The Game Bakers and released on June 27, 2012. The game has a rating of 89% based on 16 critic reviews.

=== Squids Odyssey ===
Squids Odyssey is a console-style role-playing game released for Wii U and Nintendo 3DS. It is a compilation of the game Squids and Squids Wild West, with a new chapter. The Nintendo 3DS version has a Metacritic rating of 72% based on 7 critic reviews, while the Wii U version has a Metacritic rating of 68% based on 14 critics. The game was released for PC on Steam on September 5, 2018.
