= Ekler =

- Founded: 2002
- Founder: Matthieu Gazier
- Genre: Electronic; indie
- Country of origin: France
- Location: Paris
- Official website: https://ekler.paris/

Ekler, formerly known as Ekler'o'shock, is a French independent record label and music publisher company founded in Paris in 2002 by Matthieu Gazier. Its current roster includes Polo & Pan, Andrea Laszlo De Simone, Kids Return, Antonin and MARGOT, spanning electronic, pop, alternative and contemporary music.

Over more than two decades, Ekler has developed and worked with artists including Benjamin Clementine, Danger, DatA, Limousine, Maxence Cyrin, Marie Madeleine and Alexandre Chatelard. Emerging from the French independent and electronic music scene, the company has progressively broadened its musical scope while developing its activities in publishing and synchronization.

== History ==
By 2008, when the label was still known as Ekler'o'shock, it had released music by Leonar De Leonard, Terry Poison, dAta, Don Rimini, Electroménager, Gangpol & Groupgris and Xerak.

During the 2010s, Ekler expanded its profile in France and internationally through artists including Benjamin Clementine and Polo & Pan. In 2015, Clementine received the Victoires de la Musique award for Stage Revelation, while his debut album At Least for Now won the Mercury Prize the same year. In February 2019, he was named Chevalier de l'Ordre des Arts et des Lettres.

Polo & Pan released their debut album "Caravelle" in 2017, followed by "Cyclorama" in 2021 and "22:22" in 2025. "Caravelle" was certified platinum in France and triple platinum internationally, while "Cyclorama" received a platinum export certification. The duo has also toured extensively across Europe, North America and South America.

During the 2020s, Ekler continued to broaden its roster with Andrea Laszlo De Simone, Kids Return, Antonin and MARGOT. In 2023, Kids Return received a Music Moves Europe Award, while in 2024, Andrea Laszlo De Simone won the César Award for Best Original Music for his score to Thomas Cailley's Le Règne Animal. These projects reflect the label's expansion beyond its electronic roots into pop, songwriting, orchestral and instrumental music.

The company later adopted the shortened name Ekler, replacing the Ekler'o'shock name under which it had operated since its foundation.

== Activities ==
Alongside its record label activities, Ekler operates in music publishing and synchronization, which has become a significant part of the company's work.

Music from Ekler's catalogue has been featured across film, television, advertising and brand campaigns. The label's synchronization work has notably included several international Apple campaigns featuring Polo & Pan, as well as Benjamin Clementine's music in the opening sequence of Apple's The Morning Show. Its catalogue has also been licensed for numerous international television series and advertising campaigns across the automotive, fashion, luxury and sports industries.

Ekler's work with audiovisual projects also extends to original film music. In 2024, Andrea Laszlo De Simone received the César Award for Best Original Music for his score to Thomas Cailley's Le Règne animal.
