= The Toxic Avenger (musician) =

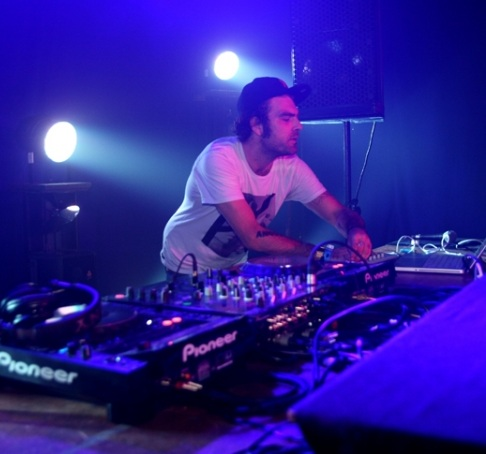
- The Toxic Avenger performing a DJ set in 2011

Background information
- Born: Simon Delacroix; 18 April 1982 (age 44); France
- Genres: Electro house; dance-punk
- Occupations: DJ; songwriter; record producer
- Years active: 2007–present
- Labels: Iheartcomix Records; Roy Music (in agreement with Universal)

Simon Delacroix (born 18 April 1982), better known by his stage name the Toxic Avenger, is a French DJ, songwriter, and record producer. Delacroix's stage name is a tribute to the cult B-movie of the same name.

== Biography ==
Simon Delacroix was born on 18 April 1982 in France. His first success was "Super Heroes" that resulted in a contract with Iheartcomix record label. He is known for his album Angst released on Roy Music label on 16 May 2011. He also released the music video directed by Wahib for the title track "Angst". He also released a number of EPs, and has had various collaborations with a number of artists including Canadian act Chromeo, Robert Bruce of the UK act South Central in "Never Stop" featuring Bruce and music video directed by Antoine Wagner. He also collaborated with French rapper Orelsan, particularly in his 2010 EP N'importe comment.

He performed under a mask up until his 2009 EP Toxic Is Dead, in 2009, symbolizing the death of the personality he'd donned in the group Ed Wood Is Dead.

He was also subject of a documentary SuperHero 2.0 broadcast on French music station M6.

In 2013, his song "Angst:two" appeared in Nissan Qashqai commercial, and in 2020, his song "Kids" has featured in a Yves Saint Laurent commercial.

== Discography ==
=== Albums ===
- 2009: Scion CD Sampler Volume 26: The Toxic Avenger (Scion AV)
- 2011: Angst (Roy Music) (charted at #194 in SNEP French Albums Chart)
- 2013: Romance and Cigarettes
- 2016: Ξ (Roy Music)
- 2019: Globes (Roy Music)
- 2020: Midnight Resistance (Enchanté Records)
- 2022: Yes Future (Enchanté Records)
- 2025: Inframonde (Enchanté Records)

=== EPs and singles ===
- 2007: "Superheroes" (Iheartcomix Records)
- 2008: "Bad Girls Need Love Too" (Boxon Records)
- 2009: "Toxic is Dead" (Iheartcomix Records)
- 2010: "N'importe Comment" (with Orelsan) (Roy Music)
- 2010: "Angst:One" (Roy Music)
- 2011: "Never Stop" (feat. Robert Bruce) (Roy Music)
- 2011: "Alien Summer" (feat. Annie) (Little Owl Musical Recordings)
- 2012: 3/2/1 EP (Roy Music)
- 2012: "To the Sun" (feat. Tulip) (Roy Music)
- 2013: "Angst:Two" (Roy Music)
- 2015: "Over Me" (Roy Music)
- 2016: "Globe Vol.1" (Roy Music)
- 2017: "Globe Vol.2" (Roy Music)
- 2017: "Globe Vol.3" (Roy Music)
- 2018: "I" (Roy Music)
- 2018: "II" (Roy Music)
- 2019: "Black" (Enchanté Records)
- 2019: "Modular Session #1" (Enchanté Records)
- 2020: "Home Call (From Road 96)" (G4F Records, DigixArt, Enchanté Records)
- 2021: "Shifted" (Enchanté Records)
- 2021: "The Toxic Avenger Remixes" (Grá Mór Phonic Records)
- 2022: "All My Heros" (Dancing Dead)
- 2022: "Breach" (Ubisoft Music)
- 2022: "Du haut du 33e étage" (Tricatel)
- 2022: "Carbon Toxique" (Enchanté Records)
- 2024: "Missions" (Enchanté Records)

=== Remixes ===
Year	Artist	Title
2007	Ballet Imperial	"Superhuman"
2007	Blur	"Song 2" (The Toxic Avenger & Trash Yourself Remix)
2007	Dragonette	"Take It Like a Man"
2007	Fredzefred	"All the Motherfuckers"
2007	John Bourke	"What Is Love"
2007	Le Castle Vania	"Tigertron"
2007	ManroX	"This Manrox" (The Toxic Avenger Yeah Yeah Remix)
2007	Snowden	"Kill the Power"
2007	The Black Milk	"Kissin"
2007	The Secret Handshake	"Too Young"
2007	Tommie Sunshine	"Dance Among the Ruins"
2008	Art Whiplash	"Party, Sex & Bullshit"
2008	Aux Raus	"Wire"
2008	Fckn Crew	"Carnage"
2008	Health	"Glitter Pills"
2008	Hermanos Inglesos	"Komodo"
2008	Holiday for Strings	"Two of You"
2008	Ladytron	"Ghosts"
2008	Late of the Pier	"Space and the Woods"
2008	Neon Stereo vs. Marcie	"Fuck Me Baby"
2008	Playdoe	"It's That Beat"
2008	Pomomofo	"Island"
2008	Roger Sanchez	"Another Chance"
2008	Saint Pauli	"I Need Rhythm"
2008	Sexual Earthquake In Kobe	"Love With"
2008	The Beach Boys	"Wouldn't It Be Nice" (Chépuky feat. Toxic Avenger Remix)
2008	The Fire and Reason	"NME" (The Fire and Reason vs. The Toxic Avenger - "NME V2 TXC")
2008	The Frail	"Who Am I?" (The Frail vs. The Toxic Avenger - "The Lights")
2008	Tom Deluxx	"Assboxer"
2008	Vegastar	"Mode Arcade"
2009	Bonjour Afrique	"Heavy"
2009	Bring Me the Horizon	"Death Breath"
2009	D-Bag feat. Naan	"Up to the Boy"
2009	Family Force 5	"Fever"
2009	HeartsRevolution	"Switchblade"
2009	Man & Man	"Les Grandes Vacances"
2009	PacoVolume	"CookieMachine"
2009	Q.G.	"Reign In Blood"
2009	Sefyu	"Molotov 4"
2009	Sonny	"Mora" (Mora vs. The Toxic Avenger)
2009	Teen Heat	"Prep the Patient"
2009	The Sterehoes	"Juliette N'est Pas Morte"
2009	The Whip	"Muzzle No. 1"
2010	Benny Benassi	"Spaceship"
2010	Cocoon	"Tell Me The"
2010	Cyberpunkers	"Check This Out"
2010	Kings of Leon	"Sex On Fire"
2010	Make the Girl Dance	"Baby Baby Baby"
2010	Make the Girl Dance	"Kill Me"
2010	RohFF	"94"
2010	Underoath	"In Division"
2011	Age of Consent	"The Beach"
2011	Dax Riders feat. Yann Destal	"Raspberry Disco"
2011	SomethingALaMode	"Show Me"
2011	South Central	"The Day I Die"
2011	Teenage Bad Girl	"Tonton Funk"
2011	The Toxic Avenger	"Alien Summer" (The Toxic Avenger Self Remix)
2011	Twin Twin	"ZXR"
2011	Velvet Code	"Say You Love Me"
2012	DiscoMirage	"Triangles"
2012	Morbid Angel	"10 More Dead"
2013	Clarke	"Refuse Resist"
2013	Demon	"Luanda City Beats"
2013	Raydio	"More Than One Way to Love a Woman"
2013	Family Force 5	"Can You Feel It"
2014	The Toxic Avenger	"Speed"
2019	Magic Sword	"The Curse"

=== Other ===
- Part of the soundtrack for Furi
  - My Only Chance
  - Make This Right
- For Road 96
  - Home Call
  - Hit the Road
  - Keep Moving Forward
  - Petrias Road
  - Ultimatum
  - A New Life
- And for Cairn
  - Rise (feat. Gildaa)
  - In My Gut (feat. Glidaa & Martin Stig Andersen)
  - Only The Mountain (from Cairn)
  - Up To Me (feat. Gildaa & Martin Stig Andersen)
  - Part of a Whole (feat. Gildaa)
