= I Got to Give It Up =

1994 single by Masterboy

Single by Masterboy

from the album Different Dreams
- Released: 1994
- Genre: Eurodance
- Length: 3:35
- Label: Polydor
- Songwriters: Enrico Zabler; Tommy Schleh; Beatrice Obrecht
- Producers: Rico Novarini; Jeff Barnes

Masterboy singles chronology
"Everybody Needs Somebody" (1993)	"I Got to Give It Up" (1994)	"Feel the Heat of the Night" (1994)

Music video
- "I Got to Give It Up" on YouTube

"I Got to Give It Up" is a song recorded by German Eurodance band Masterboy, released in 1994, by Polydor Records, as the first single from the band's third album, Different Dreams (1994). It is written by band members Enrico Zabler, Tommy Schleh and Beatrice Obrecht, and produced by Rico Novarini and Jeff Barnes. The song achieved moderate success in several European countries, becoming a top-20 hit in Finland, Switzerland, and in Masterboy's home-country, Germany, where it peaked at number 13 and charted for 19 weeks. In France, the single failed to be a success, reaching number 41, and spending two weeks on the chart. On the Eurochart Hot 100, it peaked at number 43. The accompanying music video was directed by Marco Nunneli and filmed in Heygate Estate, London. In 1998, "I Got to Give It Up" was re-recorded in a remixed version featuring Freedom Williams and Linda Rocco, and this version was included on Masterboy's 2006 studio album US-Album.

== Track listings ==
- CD maxi – Germany
1. "I Got to Give It Up" (single edit) – 3:35
2. "I Got to Give It Up" (Get Away mix) – 6:01
3. "I Got to Give It Up" (Italo mix) – 5:24
- CD maxi – Remixes – Germany
1. "I Got to Give It Up" (On and On mix) – 6:02
2. "I Got to Give It Up" (Guitana mix) – 5:47
3. "I Got to Give It Up" (instrumental mix) – 6:02
- 12-inch maxi – Germany
1. "I Got to Give It Up" (On and On mix) – 6:02
2. "I Got to Give It Up" (Guitana mix) – 5:47
- 12-inch maxi – Europe
1. "I Got to Give It Up" (Get a Way mix) – 6:01
2. "I Got to Give It Up" (Italo mix) – 5:24
- CD single – France
1. "I Got to Give It Up" (single edit) – 3:35
2. "I Got to Give It Up" (Get Away mix) – 6:01

== Credits ==
- Composition – Obrecht, Zabler, Schleh
- Lyrics – Zabler, Krauss, Schleh
- Mixing – Jeff Barnes, Rico Novarini, Thomas Engelhard
- Photograph – Fin Costello
- Production, arrangement – Jeff Barnes, Rico Novarini
- Remix – Masterboy Beat Production, Achim Sobotta

== Charts ==
=== Weekly charts ===
Chart (1994)	Peak position
Australia (ARIA)	226
Austria (Ö3 Austria Top 40)	25
Europe (Eurochart Hot 100)	43
Finland (Suomen virallinen lista)	17
France (SNEP)	41
Germany (GfK)	13
Switzerland (Schweizer Hitparade)	17

=== Year-end charts ===
Chart (1994)	Position
Germany (Media Control)	67
