= Terry Poison =

Israeli electro band

- Origin: Tel Aviv, Israel
- Genres: Synth-pop
- Years active: 2003–2015
- Labels: Phonokol, Ekler'o'shock
- Past members: Bruno Grife, Louise Kahn, Anna Landesman, Petite Meller, Gili Saar, Issar Tennenbaum
- Website: Official Site

Terry Poison were an Israeli synth-pop band. It consisted of Louise Kahn (lead vocals, guitar), Anna Landesman (synth bass) and Idan Bruno Grife (main producer, computers and synth guitar). Former band members include Gili Saar (keys), Petite Meller (vocals), and Issar Tennenbaum (Rockfour).

Each band member had a role: Louise Kahn, the leader, Petite Meller, the lolita, Gili Saar, the cold beauty, and Anna Landesman, the gothic touch and Bruno Grife, the chief hacker.

The band once stated that "Terry Poison" was fictional character. A sex and rock'n'roll girl who they would like to emulate because the girls in the band were from good families. "Terry Poison does crazy things, she never goes to bed, she doesn't get old. And besides, she has big breasts." they said.

Myspace played a part in getting the band noticed by producers and people outside of Israel.

Their debut album "Terry Poison" was released in Israel of which 3 of the album's tracks made it number 1 on all national radio charts. All the band's music was recorded in English and some French.

In 2007 the album Buzz On the Bell was released.

In 2009 they were selected by Depeche Mode to open for them in Ramat Gan's stadium. The band wrote and recorded ‘Little Doll’, the theme song for a TV serial titled "Dolls".

Touring the US and Europe, they have played at festivals such as SXSW, Sziget, Berlin Pride, Fusion, and Rock en Seine. The band had a partnership with El Al, the Israeli Airline, that allowed them to fly for free.

After many years together, the band stopped working and performing in 2015. The members live today in different countries and are involved in new projects
