= Anybody (Movin' On) =

Single by Masterboy

from the album Generation of Love
- B-side: "Remix"
- Released: 18 September 1995
- Recorded: 1995
- Genre: Eurodance
- Length: 3:52
- Label: Polydor; Club Zone (Germany); PolyGram Iberica (Spain); Mercury (Japan)
- Songwriters: Enrico Zabler; Tommy Schleh; Luke Skywalker; Beatrice Obrecht
- Producer: Masterboy

Masterboy singles chronology
"Generation of Love" (1995)	"Anybody (Movin' On)" (1995)	"Land of Dreaming" (1996)

Music video
- "Anybody (Movin' On)" on YouTube

"Anybody (Movin' On)" is a song recorded by German band Masterboy, released in September 1995, by Polydor Records, as the second single from their fourth album, Generation of Love (1995). The song was both written and produced by the band and achieved success in several countries, particularly in Finland, where it peaked at number eight. In Austria, Belgium and France, it became a top-20 hit, while in Germany, Sweden and Switzerland, it was a top-30 hit. On the Eurochart Hot 100, "Anybody (Movin' On)" reached a respectable number 37. Outside Europe, it was a huge hit in Israel, peaking at number five. The accompanying music video was directed by Gregor Schnitzler.

== Critical reception ==
Ross Jones from The Guardian wrote, "It's made in Germany, it's got a bouncy bassline, you can virtually smell the dry ice whooshing over its keyboards, and it asks you to "Shake your body to the groove" in a steely voice." Music Week rated the song three out of five, adding, "German house-poppers Masterboy hope to repeat their European successes in the Uk with this slice of infectious dancefloor fodder, though the Europop bubble does seem to have burst."

== Music video ==
The music video for "Anybody (Movin' On)" was directed by German film director Gregor Schnitzler. It was filmed in Hamburg, Germany and produced by Chopstick Films. The video features group member Enrico Zabler's son Nicolas. It was B-listed on German music television channel VIVA in October 1995.

== Track listings ==
- CD maxi
1. "Anybody (Movin' On)" (Friends Radio Edit) - 3:52
2. "Anybody (Movin' On)" (Midnight Radio Edit) - 3:25
3. "Anybody (Movin' On)" (Friends Mix) - 6:35
4. "Anybody (Movin' On)" (Midnight Mix) - 5:30
5. "Anybody (Movin' On)" (Midnight Mix-Rapless Version) - 5:30
6. "Anybody (Movin' On)" (Instrumental) - 6:35
- CD maxi - Remixes
1. "Anybody (Movin' On)" (Felix J. Gauder Radio RMX) - 4:07
2. "Anybody (Movin' On)" (Felix J. Gauder Radio Rapless RMX) - 3:49
3. "Anybody (Movin' On)" (Felix J. Gauder RMX) - 6:23
4. "Anybody (Movin' On)" (La Casa Di Tokapi RMX) - 5:26
5. "Anybody (Movin' On)" (Felix J. Gauder Rapless RMX) - 5:53
6. "Anybody (Movin' On)" (Tokapi's Club Dub) - 5:20
7. "Anybody (Movin' On)" (Neon Rave RMX) - 5:08

== Charts ==
Chart (1996)	Peak position
Austria (Ö3 Austria Top 40)	20
Belgium (Ultratop 50 Wallonia)	16
Europe (Eurochart Hot 100)	37
Finland (Suomen virallinen lista)	8
France (SNEP)	20
Germany (GfK)	26
Sweden (Sverigetopplistan)	22
Switzerland (Schweizer Hitparade)	29
