= Is This the Love =

Single by Masterboy

from the album Different Dreams
- B-side: "Remix"
- Released: 21 October 1994
- Recorded: 1994
- Genre: Eurodance
- Length: 3:43
- Label: Polydor
- Songwriters: Enrico Zabler; Tommy Schleh; Luke Skywalker; Beatrice Obrecht
- Producers: Jeff Barnes; Rico Novarini

Masterboy singles chronology
"Feel the Heat of the Night" (1994)	"Is This the Love" (1994)	"Generation of Love" (1995)

Music video
- "Is This the Love" on YouTube

"Is This the Love" is a song recorded by German Eurodance band Masterboy, released in October 1994, by Polydor Records, as the fourth single from their third album, Different Dreams (1994). It became one of band's most successful singles in terms of peak positions on the charts, hitting some success in many European countries, particularly in Austria, where it reached number eight and remained for 12 weeks in the top 30. It was also successful in their native Germany, where it reached number eleven and was ranked for 13 weeks, and in France where it peaked at number 12 and stayed for 19 weeks in the top 50. On the Eurochart Hot 100, "Is This the Love" reached number 42 in January 1995. The accompanying music video was directed by Jonathan Bate and filmed in a storage hall in Stockholm, Sweden. It was A-listed on German music television channel VIVA in December 1994.

== Track listings ==
- CD single
1. "Is This the Love" (radio edit) — 3:44
2. "Is This the Love" (big sound mix) — 6:33
- CD maxi
1. "Is This the Love" (radio edit) — 3:43
2. "Is This the Love" (union mix) — 5:30
3. "Is This the Love" (is this the house techno mix) — 6:20
4. "Is This the Love" (big sound mix) — 6:30
- CD maxi - Remixes
1. "Is This the Love" (fun club mix) — 6:12
2. "Is This the Love" (acid mix) — 5:51
3. "Is This the Love" (TNT party zone master mix) — 6:31
4. "Is This the Love" (alternative mix) — 5:34
- 12" maxi
1. "Is This the Love" (is this the house techno mix) — 6:20
2. "Is This the Love" (original mix) — 5:32

== Credits ==
- Artwork by Goutte
- Lyrics by Zabler, Krauß and Schleh
- Mastered by J. Quincy Kramer
- Music by Obrecht, Zabler and Schleh
- Mixed by J. Barnes, R. Novarini, T. Engelhard (radio edit & big sound mix), M. Persona (union mix)
- Photography by Julia Maloof
- Recorded and arranged by Jeff Barnes and Rico Novarini (radio edit & big sound mix), Lorenzo Carpella and Max Persona (union mix & alternative mix), Nico D'Acido (is this the house techno mix), Misar and Uwe Wagenknecht (fun club mix), Robotnico (acid mix), TNT Party Zone (TNT party zone master mix), Jeff Barnes, Rico Novarini and Thomas Engelhard (original mix)
- Produced by Masterboy Beat Production

== Charts ==
=== Weekly charts ===
Chart (1994–1995)	Peak position
Austria (Ö3 Austria Top 40)	8
Europe (Eurochart Hot 100)	42
Finland (Suomen virallinen lista)	19
France (SNEP)	12
Germany (GfK)	11
Sweden (Sverigetopplistan)	37
Switzerland (Schweizer Hitparade)	20

=== Year-end charts ===
Chart (1995)	Position
Latvia (Latvijas Top 50)	183
France (SNEP)	78
