= Haven (video game) =

2020 video game

- Developer: The Game Bakers
- Publisher: The Game Bakers
- Director: Emeric Thoa
- Composer: Danger
- Engine: Unity
- Platforms: Microsoft Windows; PlayStation 5; Xbox One; Xbox Series X/S; Nintendo Switch; PlayStation 4
- Release: Windows, PS5, Xbox One, Xbox Series X/S; December 3, 2020; Switch, PS4; February 4, 2021
- Genre: Role-playing
- Modes: Single-player, multiplayer

Haven is a 2020 role-playing video game developed and published by The Game Bakers. The game was released for PlayStation 5, Windows, Xbox One, and Xbox Series X/S in December 2020, while versions for PlayStation 4 and Nintendo Switch were released in February 2021. It received mixed reviews from critics, who were divided about the story.

== Gameplay ==
Haven is a third-person role-playing game with survival game elements. The game is about two lovers, Yu and Kay, who escape to an uninhabited lost planet called Source. The player can control either character, or play in co-op multiplayer with another person, as they search for materials and resources for the Nest, their spaceship. The two protagonists are equipped with a pair of anti-gravity boots, which are used to navigate the world and glide on "flow threads". Occasionally, players will face hostile rusted creatures. The game features real time combat, which requires the players to coordinate and utilize the skills of both Yu and Kay. At the Nest, players can craft new items, rest and heal, and cook food using the resources and ingredients collected in the world.

== Plot ==
Haven focuses on Yu and Kay, two fugitives in love that have escaped from an oppressive authoritarian society called "the Apiary", one which forces couples into arranged marriages. Running away to a mysterious planet called Source, they navigate through the strange world in search for resources while fighting hostile inhabitants along the way.

Yu and Kay successfully flee through the flow bridge that connects the planets and begin a new life on Source together, but as their floating island crumbles, their ship is damaged. They begin to explore Source to work on repairing it, and realize that the Apiary had colonized Source at some point. There is also a mysterious spreading contagion called Rust. After the Apiary sends drones after them, the pair decide to video call Yu's mother, who reveals Source's strange floating island state is the result of Apiary's disastrous experiments to harvest Flow and study Rust only 20 years ago. After Kay's pendant opens a door on Source, they realize that Kay's parents probably died on Source during that incident.

Eventually the pair is contacted by Lord Ozias, Yu's assigned spouse before she fled with Kay. Ozias announces his intention to come to Source and bring Yu back – and wipe their memory if they refuse him. The couple decide they have only one option: sever the connecting bridge from Source that allows the Apiary to travel there. They must repair their ship and fly into the source of both Flow and Rust.

The game has several endings. If Yu and Kay have misgivings about severing the flow bridge, they decide to make a last stand against Ozias' drones, which eventually capture them. The two of them are shown being brainwashed and memory wiped but eventually content in their separated assigned lives on Apiary. If Yu and Kay decide to close the flow bridge, one of them is blasted with Rust and is permanently scarred, but they succeed in closing off Source from the Apiary and can begin their lives on Source without fear of the Apiary's interference.

== Development and release ==
Haven was developed and published by The Game Bakers, which was known for developing Furi (2016). Emeric Thoa, the game's creative director, described the game as "Journey meets Persona". The team wanted to create a game which focuses on the romantic relationship between the two protagonists because they felt that most games in the modern market do not handle the subject matter with maturity, and believed that there is room for a game based entirely on that idea. Originally, the concept of Haven featured eight couples with a diverse range of relationships but it became clear during production that the team wouldn't be able to reach their initial vision for the full cast, so they focused on only two characters. The game's name "Haven" reflected its high-concept, referring to the place where players can "be safe and in love".

Thoa compared the combat to that of a rhythm game, since it was designed to be accessible and relaxing without being "intellectually exhausting". The cooperative multiplayer mode was introduced at the game's late stage of development. Other inspirations for the game include Prince of Persia (2008), Catherine, ToeJam & Earl, and Phantasy Star. The works of Shakespere also inspired the team, with Thoa calling the initial pitch "Romeo and Juliet but instead of dying they escaped in space". The design of the two protagonists was inspired by Image Comics' Saga. Electronic musician Danger composed the game's music. The music from Franco-Japanese animation series including Ulysses 31 and The Mysterious Cities of Gold were his major inspirations when he was working on the game's original soundtrack.

The Game Bakers officially revealed Haven in February 2019. The game was released for PlayStation 5, Windows, Xbox One, and Xbox Series X/S on December 3, 2020. PlayStation 4 and Nintendo Switch versions were released on February 4, 2021.

On March 3, 2022, The Game Bakers announced that same-sex couple options would come to the game in a free update.

== Reception ==
Reception

Aggregate scores
Aggregator	Score
Metacritic	PC: 73/100; PS5: 72/100; XSXS: 78/100; NS: 78/100
OpenCritic	73% recommend

Review scores
Publication	Score
IGN	8/10
Jeuxvideo.com	15/20
PC Gamer (US)	72/100

Haven received "generally favorable" reviews from critics for the Xbox Series X/S and Nintendo Switch versions, while the PC and PS5 versions received "mixed or average" reviews, according to review aggregator website Metacritic. Fellow review aggregator OpenCritic assessed that the game received strong approval, being recommended by 73% of critics.

Kyle Campbell of IGN rated the game 8/10, calling it a "charming and unusual sci-fi RPG". He praised the game's exploration, citing the game's anti-gravity boots as "thrilling". He also called the combat "respectable", but criticized the game's "small, desolately sparse zones", and "chores" that involve cleaning the world of rust covering the landscape, comparing it to mining in Mass Effect 2.

Emma Davies of PC Gamer rated the game 72/100, comparing the game's movement to Journey. She called the game's central relationship "skillfully handled", and praised its lack of "awkward flirting and anguished emotions", saying "I could happily watch a Netflix series about Yu and Kay". However, she criticized the game world as lacking variety, calling exploration "more like a chore than something compelling", and also disliked that they were not shown exploring buildings, with the camera remaining outside.

Kazuma Hashimoto of Siliconera rated the game 5/10, saying that "while the narrative may resonate with some, others may bounce off of it hard", and also stating that it "plucks bits and pieces from stories that have already been told in better, more effective ways". Saying that Haven would have been better if it only focused on exploration and the main characters' relationship, he criticized the game's deeper plot elements, such as why they fled their former space colony, the Apiary, as not making sense. He stated that "the combat functions well enough and can be fun for the first few hours".

Kenneth Shepard of Fanbyte praised The Game Bakers for Haven's Couples Update, saying the addition of same-sex options "underlines that if a studio is willing and eager to do right by its queer fans, it can get the job done."
