= Hyena (music producer) =

Swedish musician and producer

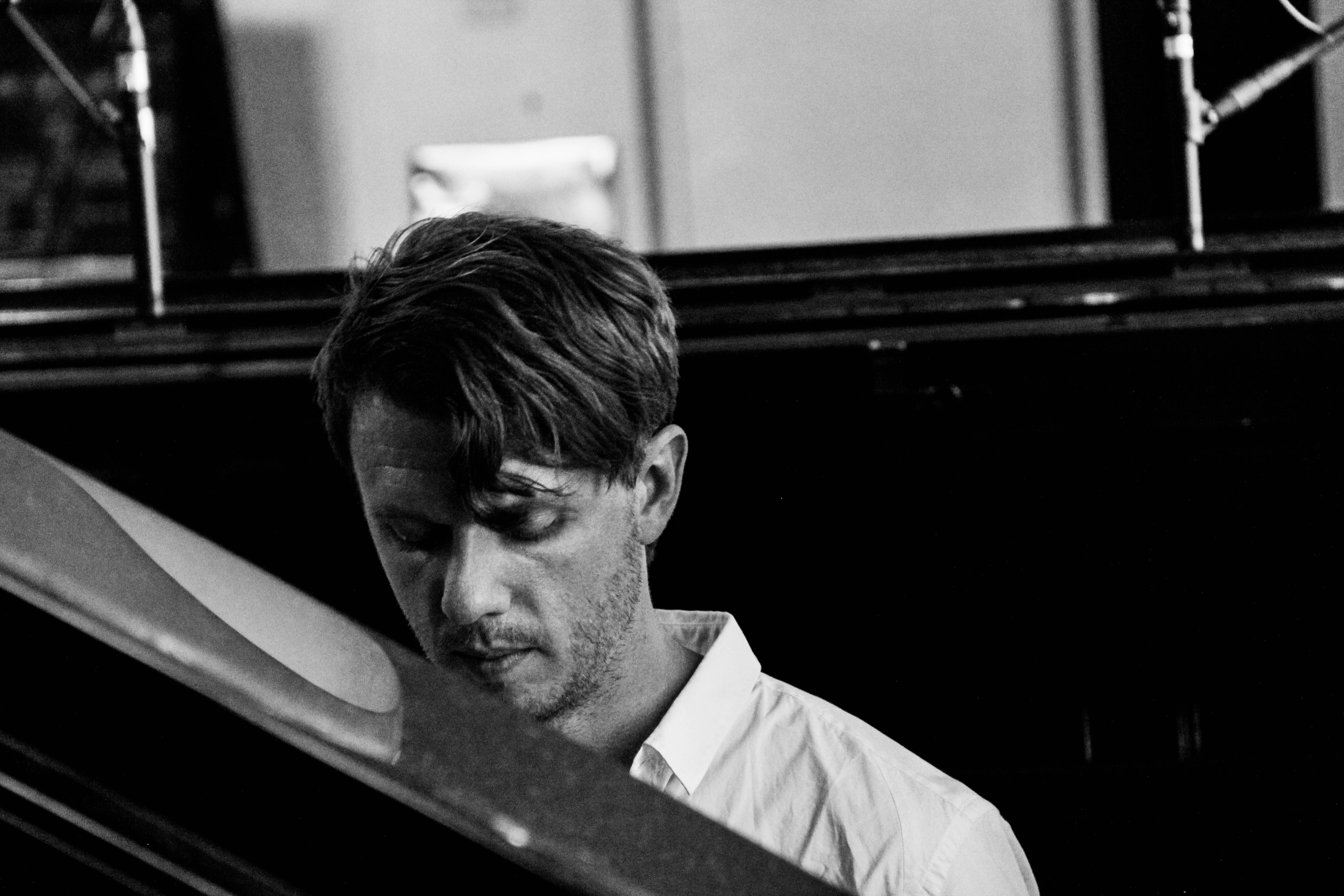

Background information
- Birth name: Andreas Söderlund
- Genres: Indie rock, Pop, Soul, Rhythm & Blues
- Occupation(s): Record producer, songwriter, musician
- Instrument(s): Drums, bass, guitar, keyboard, percussion
- Years active: 2003–present
- Labels: published by Sony/ATV Music Publishing
- Website: open.spotify.com/user/hkivim%C3%A4e/playlist/5EXuHVDaCo38NHnOFuOaeW

Andreas Söderlund, known professionally as Hyena, is a gold record-selling Swedish producer, songwriter and multi-instrumentalist.

His track record contains acts such as Elias (Swedish Grammy nominated), Erik Rapp, Grace Carter, Jarryd James, Shout Out Louds, Janice (Swedish Grammy nominated) (who he had one of the most played Swedish songs with on P3 during 2016), and Saint to name a few. He has also produced Hello Saferide's debut album, "Introducing Hello Saferide".

Söderlund (vocals, guitar) was also a member of Niccokick, a guitar-driven Swedish indie rock group, formed 2001 in Båstad, Sweden.

== Production and Writing ==
=== Discography ===
Year	Artist	Album	Song	Note
2003	Niccokick	Turn 27	"Turn 27"	
2003	Niccokick	Turn 27	"Coming Home"	
2003	Niccokick	Turn 27	"I Want You Back"	
2003	Niccokick	Turn 27	"I Drink to Get Thrilled"	
2005	Hello Saferide	Introducing Hello Saferide	"Nothing Like You (When You're Gone)"	
2005	Hello Saferide	Introducing Hello Saferide	"My Best Friend"	
2005	Hello Saferide	Introducing Hello Saferide	"If I Don't Write This Song, Someone I Love Will Die"	
2005	Hello Saferide	Introducing Hello Saferide	"I Thought You Said Summer Is Going to Take the Pain Away"	
2005	Hello Saferide	Introducing Hello Saferide	"I Don't Sleep Well"	
2005	Hello Saferide	Introducing Hello Saferide	"Long Last Penpal"	
2005	Hello Saferide	Introducing Hello Saferide	"Saturday Nights"	
2005	Hello Saferide	Introducing Hello Saferide	"San Francisco"	
2005	Hello Saferide	Introducing Hello Saferide	"Get Sick Soon"	
2005	Hello Saferide	Introducing Hello Saferide	"I Can't Believe This Is Not Love!"	
2005	Hello Saferide	Introducing Hello Saferide	"Loneliness is Better When You're Not Alone"	
2005	Hello Saferide	Introducing Hello Saferide	"Highschool Stalker"	
2006	Hello Saferide	Would You Let Me Play This EP 10 Times A Day?	"Lover"	Gold in Sweden
2006	Hello Saferide	Would You Let Me Play This EP 10 Times A Day?	"The Quiz"	Gold in Sweden
2006	Hello Saferide	Would You Let Me Play This EP 10 Times A Day?	"2006"	Gold in Sweden
2006	Hello Saferide	Would You Let Me Play This EP 10 Times A Day?	"Last Night"	Gold in Sweden
2006	Hello Saferide	Would You Let Me Play This EP 10 Times A Day?	"Last Bitter Song"	Gold in Sweden
2006	Hello Saferide	Would You Let Me Play This EP 10 Times A Day?	"Leaving You Behind"	Gold in Sweden
2012	Leo Leoson	—	"The Contemporary Dancer"	
2012	Nervous Nellie	Where The Nightmare Gets In		
2012	Nervous Nellie	Where The Nightmare Gets In	"Beacons"	
2012	Nervous Nellie	Where The Nightmare Gets In	"Eaten By Bears"	
2012	Nervous Nellie	Where The Nightmare Gets In	"Gloves"	
2012	Nervous Nellie	Where The Nightmare Gets In	"Skeletons"	
2012	Nervous Nellie	Where The Nightmare Gets In	"You're So Sad (feat. Paloma Faith)"	
2012	Nervous Nellie	Where The Nightmare Gets In	"Cat like figure"	
2012	Nervous Nellie	Where The Nightmare Gets In	"Shoulder"	
2012	Nervous Nellie	Where The Nightmare Gets In	"The Violence"	
2012	Nervous Nellie	Where The Nightmare Gets In	"Dead Dirt"	
2012	Nervous Nellie	Where The Nightmare Gets In	"No Sound"	
2014	It's a bird! It's a plane!	—	"Black Flag"	
2015	Elias	Warcry	"Cloud"	
2015	Elias	Warcry	"Blinded By You"	
2015	Elias	Warcry	"Northern Lights"	
2015	Elias	Warcry	"Revolution"	Gold in Sweden
2015	Erik Rapp	—	"Louder"	
2015	Erik Rapp	—	"Available"	
2015	Ms. Henrik	—	"Slow Dancing"	
2015	Ms. Henrik	—	"My Only Vice"	
2015	Suvi	Mad at Heart	"Bad Company"	
2015	Suvi	Mad at Heart	"Summer Drama"	
2016	Ms. Henrik	—	"Cut Down On Everyone"	
2017	Erik Rapp	Lovers EP	"No Reason"	
2017	Erik Rapp	Lovers EP	"Closer To You"	
2017	Erik Rapp	Lovers EP	"Look Like Lovers"	
2017	Erik Rapp	Lovers EP	"Available"	
2017	Elias	—	"Thinking Of You"	
2018	Leo Leoson	—	"Morning Lullaby"	
2018	Janice_Kavander aka Janice	Fallin' Up	"Intro"	
2018	Janice_Kavander aka Janice	Fallin' Up	"Black Lies" – ft Saint	Released as single 2017
2018	Janice_Kavander aka Janice	Fallin' Up	"You Only Say You Love Me In the Dark"	
2018	Janice_Kavander aka Janice	Fallin' Up	"Answer"	Gold in Sweden Released as single 2017
2018	Janice_Kavander aka Janice	Fallin' Up	"Lullaby"	
2018	Janice_Kavander aka Janice	Fallin' Up	"Enough"	
2018	Janice_Kavander aka Janice	Fallin' Up	"Someone New"	
2018	Janice_Kavander aka Janice	Fallin' Up	"Picture"	
2018	Janice_Kavander aka Janice	Fallin' Up	"Don't Need To"	Released as single 2016
2018	Janice_Kavander aka Janice	Fallin' Up	"Changing"	
2018	Janice_Kavander aka Janice	Fallin' Up	"I Got You"	Released as single 2017
2018	Janice_Kavander aka Janice	Fallin' Up	"Love You Like I Should"	Released as single 2017
2018	Janice_Kavander aka Janice	Fallin' Up	"Queen"	Platinum in Sweden Released as single 2017
2018	Shout_Out_Louds	—	"In New Europe"	
2018	Shout_Out_Louds	—	"Up The Hill"	
2018	Elias	Entwined	"Hope"	Released as single 2017
2018	Elias	Entwined	"Love Hurts"	
2018	Elias	Entwined	"Tearing Down the Walls"	
2018	Elias	Entwined	"No Deeper We Can Fall"	
2018	Elias	Entwined	"Don't Let Me Wait"	
2018	Elias	Entwined	"Gold"	
2018	Elias	Entwined	"Revolution"	Released as single 2015
2019	Potty_Mouth_(band)	SNAFU	"Plastic Paradise"	
2019	Slide	Into Happiness	"Laugh Some More"	Released as single 2018
2019	Slide	Into Happiness	"If You Say"	
2019	Janice_Kavander aka Janice	I Don't Know a Thing About Love	"Kisses At Night Time"	
2019	Janice_Kavander aka Janice	I Don't Know a Thing About Love	"Need You"	
2019	Emelie Hollow	Hear It Out Loud	"Ghost Out of the Blue"	
2019	Janice_Kavander aka Janice	Reflection	"We Love Disney"	
2019	Bendik	Ikke Redd	"Det Går Bra"	
2019	Petite_Meller_	—	"The Way I Want"	
2019	Janice_Kavander aka Janice	—	"I'll Be Home for Christmas"	
2020	Elias	HIM	"In Time"	
2020	Janice_Kavander aka Janice	—	"Rain Brings Out the Sun"	
2020	Petite_Meller_(singer)	—	"Dying Out of Love"	
2020	Jordan Thomas	Stairway to Heaven	"Playing It Safe"	
2021	Isak Danielson	Tomorrow Never Came	"Start Again"	
2021	Janice Kavander aka Janice	—	"Magic"	
2021	Francis on my Mind	—	"The End"	
2022	Annika Norlin	Mentor	"Darkest Shade of Dark"	Released as single 2021
2022	Annika Norlin	Mentor	"Hydra"	Released as single 2021
2022	Annika Norlin	Mentor	"The Woods"	
2022	Annika Norlin	Mentor	"Tonight"	
2022	Annika Norlin	Mentor	"Mentor"	
2022	Annika Norlin	Mentor	"Alien"	
2022	Annika Norlin	Mentor	"Pengar"	Released as single 2021
2022	Annika Norlin	Mentor	"Mitt gäng"	
2022	Annika Norlin	Mentor	"Vita frun"	
2022	Annika Norlin	Mentor	"Avtryck"	
2022	Annika Norlin	Mentor	"Kroppen som en skål"	
2022	Annika Norlin	Mentor	"Den sista"	Released as single 2021

== Discography ==
=== Niccokick ===
==== Album ====
- The Good Times We Share Were They So Bad (2008)
- Awake From the Dead, My Dear Best Friend (2004)

==== Extended Play (EP) ====
- Turn 27 (2003)
- Run! Run! Run! (2004)

==== Singles ====
- Love & neon lights (2004)
