= Petite Meller =

French-Israeli singer

- Meller in 2014

Background information
- Born: Syvan Meller; July 14, 1990 (age 36); Paris, France
- Origin: Paris, France
- Genres: Pop; art pop; jazz
- Occupations: Singer; songwriter
- Years active: 2003–present
- Label: Island
- Formerly of: Terry Poison
- Website: www.petite-meller.com

Syvan Petite Meller, known professionally as Petite Meller, is a French-American singer, songwriter and model based in Los Angeles. Her debut album, Lil Empire, including the song "Baby Love", was released on 9 September 2016. Meller's work is heavily influenced by philosophy, cinema, visual fashion artistry, Graceland by Paul Simon and her grandmother.

In 2026, three of Meller's original songs were included on the original Netflix anime series Cyberpunk: Edgerunners 2 official soundtrack, including "High Forever" (Marlon Hoffstadt remix).

== Early life ==
Meller was born in Paris, France, and relocated to Tel Aviv when she was 11. Meller's mother is French, her father is Polish and she has one sister. Growing up, she split her time between Israel and Paris, where she would stay with her grandmother.

Meller grew up listening to jazz and African artists such as Fela Kuti. The first time she performed onstage was at a summer vacation Club Med contest in the south of France where she came second and won a pink milkshake. When Meller was young she would write songs and record them on a tape deck. At age seven, Meller and a boy she had a crush on, recorded a song together in a restroom to capture the sound of the water.

== Career ==
Meller began her career in Israel, performing as a vocalist in the Israeli synth-pop band Terry Poison from 2003 to 2011. After leaving the band, Meller moved to Brooklyn, New York to seek out her own sound in 2012. Speaking of her departure from Terry Poison, Meller said that the decision to leave left her "liberated" and filled with "feminine power." During her time with Terry Poison, the band released a self-titled debut album, with Meller assisting with writing and composing as well as performing vocals throughout the album.

In 2014, Meller moved to London after meeting her manager.

In 2015, Meller signed a record deal with Island Records UK and Island Records US, plus a publishing deal with Warner/Chappell Music US.

Her 2015 single "Baby Love" peaked at number 30 on the UK Singles Chart. The Music Video for Baby Love reached 13M views on Youtube. Meller performed at Reading and Leeds and Latitude Festival in 2015.

Her debut album, Lil Empire, was released on 9 September 2016.

Meller was nominated for the MTV Europe Music Award for The Best Push Artist of 2017.

In 2020, with the release of "Dying Out of Love", Mellor stepped into a new genre of music she called "ork pop" (orchestral pop). Her upcoming album will include a song written for her by Diane Warren and will include music from the Moscow Royal Orchestra.

Considered a style icon, Meller has sat front row at fashion shows such as Chanel, Armani, and Miu Miu. Photographers that have worked with Meller include Mario Testino, Ellen von Unwerth, Valerie Phillips, and Jean-Baptiste Mondino, for publications including Vogue US, Interview, Time, V, The Guardian, i-D, Vice, Paper, the Evening Standard, NME, Vanity Fair, W, Flaunt, Wonderland and Dazed. Meller was the face for 2020 Elle Mexico and has featured on the cover of magazines such as French Fries, Vein, S, Irk, Elle Belgium and Harpers Bazaar Vietnam.

== Artistry ==
In publications Meller is portrayed as a French singer, even though she herself defines herself as a citizen of the world. She has stated that her music is "not very connected to reality", and she describes her music as "nouveau jazzy pop".

Meller is known to use her philosophy studies as inspiration woven into her songs and videos as well as cinematic homages. When speaking to Paper magazine about her artistic mission, Meller referenced to Stephen Hawking's theory and said there is "a multiplicity of realities at the same time. In my videos I create my small realities, because I believe we have to take all the desires and the fantasies and expose them. To bring the unconscious life to reality: that's what I like".

Image is a big part of Meller's persona and uses her ear as a compass that leads to her aesthetic. When listening to recordings of her songs, she stated that she has clear visions of where to go to shoot the video, the colours and the story.

Meller is regularly seen with pink cheeks, blonde pigtails, bonnets, leotards and whimsical clothing in a childlike lolita look. Meller spoke about her style by saying, "I dress a bit like a clown sometimes, like an absurd character, because I feel that life is very absurd and there's nothing to do but dance the pain away. That's what my shows are about. They're a celebration." During a family vacation, Meller suffered severe sunburn on her face and body. As a result of this, Meller wears pink blush on her cheeks as a symbolic reminder of the past trauma she faced. She cites psycho-analysts Freud and Lacan as the inspiration behind this decision.

When asked by Flavour magazine if it is important to Meller that there is a deep message to her songs she responded; "Not really, I'd like people to have fun listening to my music. I've always preferred the taste of chocolate milk to the deepness of a sour coffee with no sugar. For me, just watching school kids dancing out of control to Baby Love in the school yard is everything."

== Video clips ==
Video clips for her music are much of Meller's expression as an artist. Meller works almost exclusively with director and architect Asaf Tennessee Mann and Mexican director, Napoleon Habeica to encapsulate her unique aesthetic style. Before filming a video, Meller arrives at least a week in advance to scout for local characters to cast and include in her destiny premise. Each of her videos are usually bright in colour and include similar visual tie-ins of people gathering in a line and dancing around her. Inspired by her grandma, a handkerchief and hand cast are often repeated in her videos to capture the feeling of overcoming and healing in life.

In the "Backpack" video, Meller shows an artistic representation of scenes from her childhood discovering sexuality for the first time through a game or while walking alone in the open fields and feeling pleasure for the first time. The water ski scene is about feeling free and acknowledging that things are falling into their place. Meller wanted to water-ski and by coincidence she met a fan who taught her the craft each weekend on the boarder of Switzerland. The song is based on philosopher Zizek's quote "love your symptom", which Meller takes to mean use what holds you back in life and make it your purpose - a backpack of devotion. The video is a homage to the film L'Enfer by Henri-Georges Clouzot. The video was nominated at the Cannes Festival Young Director Awards 2014 for Best European Music Video.

The 2014 video for "NYC Time" was directed by A.T. Mann and Napoleon Habeica and features Meller being carried by her friend, Justin Elephant through New York, a forest and other settings. It was inspired by David Hamilton's aesthetics and represents the voyage of rhythm to NYC.

The video for "Baby Love" was filmed in Kenya inspired by broken hearted school girls dancing their pain away. Its colonial aesthetic divided opinion as Meller danced in scanty costumes alongside locals and giraffes which drew some questions about if it was unsettling that such a community was being used as "video meat" as The Evening Standard reported. When questioned about how the community were compensated, Meller stated that the record company paid the community, furnished their dance school with mirrors and gave computers to the school. Rather than shock value, Meller chose Kenya because she was inspired by Paul Simon's Graceland and its African sounds and that she felt strongly about the troubles in the area with Boko Haram, so wanted to show strong African women to put a different perspective on things.

The video for "Icebear", a rework of the song by '80s German band Grauzone, was shot in a snow covered landscape inspired by the work of Andrew Tarkovsky and Ingmar Bergman and directed by A.T. Mann.

Barbaric's video is shot in a retirement home in Miami with the actual residents. Meller was inspired because she spent a lot of her youth with her grandparents as her parents were often too busy. She calls the video a kind of closure for her grandma.

The song "Milk Bath" deals with psychoanalysis, and the first meal a baby has in life is milk. "That's what needs and desires are about – it starts with the milk", Meller said. The video was shot in Germany and Sengal and once again was directed by A.T. Mann. Special permission needed to be granted by scientists for Meller to be allowed to swim in famous pink lake in Senegal, and in return she was required to provide a sample of the water.

In the video for "The Flute", Meller travelled to Mongolia to find a tribe of blush cheeked girls that she had once seen in a photo around the time she suffered the traumatic sunburn.

In 2019, Meller released the song "Aeroplane", which she wrote while traveling on an aeroplane to Rio de Janeiro. The video depicts Meller on a journey across America in a feather covered orange coat and other fashion creations. She is supported by teams of dancers in different locations. L'Officiel described the video as "avant-garde" and "full of fashion, symbolism, and choreography".

The 2020 released video for "Dying Out of Love", used a patchwork of user generated videos from Instagram fans created during the pandemic. It was written in collaboration with Andreas Soderlund (Hyena), who wrote the tune for his wedding. Meller heard the song and added the lyrics about the pain of her relationship break-up that occurred during the early days of the pandemic. Meller felt like she was underwater during the separation so incorporated that by filming in a swimming pool.

== Personal life ==
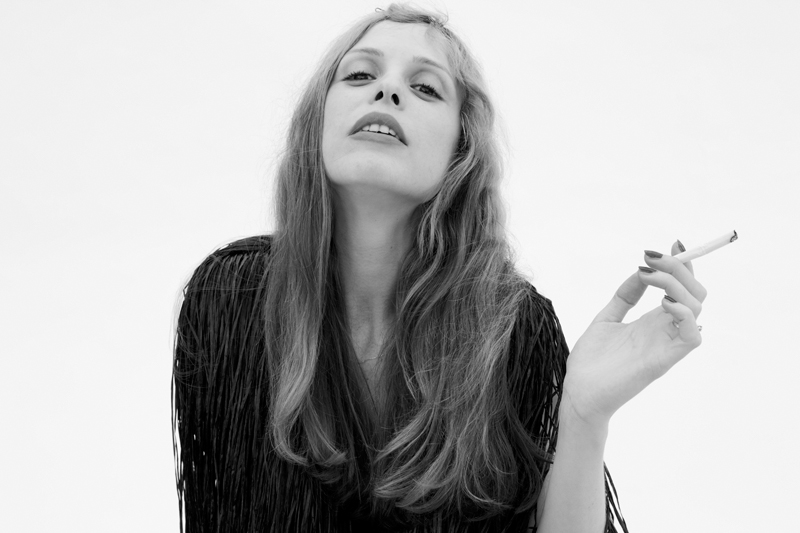
Meller in 2011

Meller studied postgraduate philosophy at the Sorbonne in Paris and the University of Tel Aviv where her thesis was about the sublime and psychosis, inspired by the works of Schiller and Kant. She undertook a PhD in philosophy at UCLA which she stated helps her to understand how everything affects her lyrics about dying and psychosis.

Meller believes in fateful encounters based on seeking help from the universe. She recounts numerous people whom she has met at the right time through coincidental situations. One such person was her manager who discovered her when he was searching the internet to find the local time in New York, but instead found himself watching her video for NYC Time. He subsequently approached her, moved her to London and helped her secure a record deal with Island.

An article from September 2016 in the Financial Times noted Meller's age as then 21, however the Evening Standard pointed to a video of Meller singing in 2007 with Terry Poison, which by the Financial Times' reporting would have made her just 12 years old at the time, leading to some confusion. Meller's birthday is 14 July; however she has kept the year of her birth a secret.

Meller currently lives in Los Angeles and enjoys collecting pink vinyl records. She became an American citizen in 2025.

== Discography ==
=== Albums ===
Title	Details
Lil Empire	Released: 9 September 2016; Label: Island; Format: CD, digital download

=== Singles ===
Title	Year	Peak chart positions		
Title	Year	NZ Hot	UK Singles Chart	Italian Singles Chart
"Backpack"	2013	—		
"NYC Time"	2014	—		
"Baby Love"	2015	—	30	1
"Barbaric"	2015	—		
"Sunday Morning" (with Børns)	2015	—		
"Lil' Love" (featuring Pnau)	2016	—		
"Milk Bath"	2016	—		
"The Flute"	2016	—		
"Aeroplane"	2019	—		
"The Way I Want"	2019	—		
"Dying Out of Love"	2020	—		
"The Drummer"	2022	—		
"High Forever" (Marlon Hoffstadt remix; from Cyberpunk: Edgerunners 2)	2026	—		
"High Forever"	2026	21		
"Watson" (featuring Oslo Green)	2026	—		
"In Love with Myself"	2026	1	82	

== Awards and nominations ==
Award ceremony	Year	Nominated work	Category	Result
Berlin Music Video Awards	2016	BABY LOVE	Best Director	Nominated
Berlin Music Video Awards	2016	BARBARIC	Best Art Director	Nominated
