= HMS Hyaena =

Four ships of the Royal Navy have borne the name HMS Hyaena (or HMS Hyæna), after the Hyena, a family of carnivorous mammals. Two others were planned but either commissioned under another name or cancelled.

- HMS Hyaena (1778) was a 24-gun post ship launched in 1778. The French Concorde captured her in 1793 and she became the privateer Hyene. In 1797 Indefatigable recaptured her near Tenerife. Recommissioned under her old name, Hyaena was sold in 1802. She then became the whaler Recovery and made seven voyages to the southern whale fishery before she was broken up in 1813.
- HMS Hyaena (1804) was a 28-gun sixth rate, formerly the civilian Hope. She was purchased in 1804 and became a storeship in 1813. She was sold in 1822.
- HMS Hyaena was to have been a 10-gun Cherokee-class brig-sloop. She was laid down in 1825, but renamed and launched in 1826 as HMS Calypso.
- HMS Hyaena was a 10-gun Cherokee-class brig-sloop under construction as HMS Calypso, but renamed in 1826. She was cancelled in 1831.
- HMS Hyaena (1856) was a wooden screw Albacore-class gunboat launched in 1856 and sold in 1870 as a salvage vessel.
- HMS Hyaena (1873) was an iron screw Ant-class gunboat launched in 1873 and sold in 1906.
