= Feel the Heat of the Night =

1994 single by Masterboy

Single by Masterboy

from the album Different Dreams
- Released: 24 June 1994
- Genre: Eurodance; Euro House
- Length: 3:46
- Label: Polydor
- Songwriters: Beatrice Obrecht; Tommy Schleh; Luke Skywalker; Enrico Zabler
- Producers: Jeff Barnes; Rico Novarini

Masterboy singles chronology
| "I Got to Give It Up" (1994) | "Feel the Heat of the Night" (1994) | "Is This the Love" (1994) |

Music video
- "Feel the Heat of the Night" on YouTube

"Feel the Heat of the Night" is a song by German Eurodance group Masterboy, released in June 1994 by Polydor Records as the second single from their third album, Different Dreams (1994). The song's vocals are performed by Trixi Delgado, and the music is characterised as "rhythmic and swift", finding its inspiration from the Eurodance-style that was popular in the mid 1990's.

"Feel the Heat of the Night" achieved success in several countries, particularly in Austria, France, and Germany. On the Eurochart Hot 100, "Feel the Heat of the Night" reached number 22. Kai von Kotze directed the single's music video which was filmed in Heidelberg, Germany. In 2003 and 2006, the song was re-released in remix versions, but was much less successful. The artwork of the remixes used the same picture made by Günther Blum but with different colours.

== Critical reception ==
James Hamilton from Music Week's RM Dance Update described the song as a "routine cheesy German galloper with usual ingredients". Barbara Ellen from NME said, "Masterboy are German disco-peddlers who probably do a lot of praying and kow-towing in front of Snap! posters before they go into the studio."

== Music video ==
The accompanying music video for "Feel the Heat of the Night" was directed by Kai von Kotze and filmed in Thingstätte amphitheater in Heidelberg, Germany. It was produced by Czar Films GmbH and received A-list rotation on German music television channel VIVA in August 1994.

== Track listings ==
- CD maxi
1. "Feel the Heat of the Night" (radio edit) — 3:46
2. "Feel the Heat of the Night" (free and independent mix) — 6:44
3. "Feel the Heat of the Night" (sunshine mix) — 6:06
- 12-inch maxi
1. "Feel the Heat of the Night" (radio edit) — 3:46
2. "Feel the Heat of the Night" (free and independent mix) — 6:44
3. "Feel the Heat of the Night" (sunshine mix) — 6:06
4. "Feel the Heat of the Night" (shark mix) — 5:52
- CD single
1. "Feel the Heat of the Night" (radio edit) — 3:46
2. "Feel the Heat of the Night" (free and independent mix) — 6:44
- CD remix single
1. "Feel the Heat of the Night" (unplugged) — 3:00
2. "Feel the Heat of the Night" (voodoo mix) — 6:00
3. "Masterboy mega mix" — 7:40
- CD maxi - 2003 remixes
1. "Feel the Heat of the Night" (shark mix) — 5:52
2. "Feel the Heat of the Night" (the second mix) — 5:52
3. "Feel the Heat of the Night" (bass mix) — 5:26
- 12-inch maxi - 2003 remixes
1. "Feel the Heat of the Night 2003" (2003 club mix) — 7:38
2. "Feel the Heat of the Night 2003" (special D. remix) — 7:34

== Credits ==
- Produced by "Masterboy Beat Production" at Stession Studios, Walldorf
- Mixed by Thomas Engelhard, Rico Novarini and Jeff Barnes
- Keyboards programming by Rico Novarini
- Sample programming by Jeff Barnes
- All mixes arranged by Rico Novarini and Jeff Barnes
- Music by Zabler, Schleh, Obrecht
- Words by Zabler, Schleh and Krauss
- Published by Session Musikverlag / Warner Chappell
- Photography by Günther Blum

== Charts ==
=== Weekly charts ===
Original version

| Chart (1994) | Peak position |
|---|---|
| Austria (Ö3 Austria Top 40) | 10 |
| Europe (Eurochart Hot 100) | 22 |
| France (SNEP) | 2 |
| Germany (GfK) | 8 |
| Israel (Israeli Singles Chart) | 13 |
| Scotland (OCC) | 100 |
| Sweden (Sverigetopplistan) | 37 |
| Switzerland (Schweizer Hitparade) | 16 |
| UK Singles (OCC) | 82 |
| UK Club Chart (Music Week) | 60 |

2003 remixes

| Chart (2003) | Peak position |
|---|---|
| Austria (Ö3 Austria Top 40) | 51 |
| Germany (GfK) | 67 |
| Hungary (Dance Top 40) | 36 |

=== Year-end charts ===
| Chart (1994) | Position |
|---|---|
| Europe (Eurochart Hot 100) | 91 |
| France (SNEP) | 27 |
| Germany (Media Control) | 54 |
