= Masterboy =

German musical group

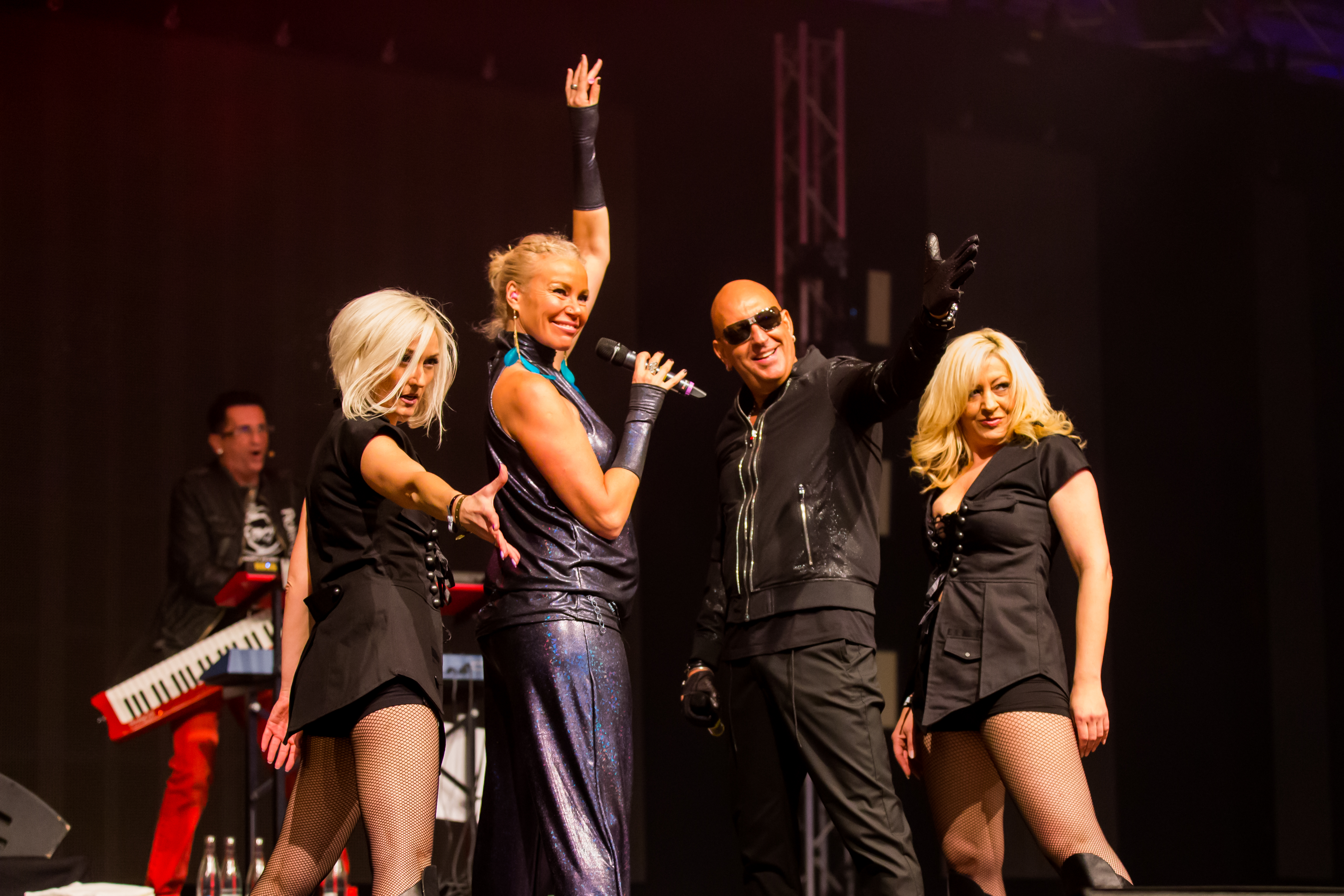
- Masterboy in 2014.

Background information
- Origin: Walldorf, Germany
- Genre: Eurodance
- Years active: 1990–2003; 2013–present
- Labels: Polydor, Club Zone
- Members: Tommy Schleh; Enrico Zabler; Trixi Delgado
- Past members: Linda Rocco; Annabell Kay; David Atterberry; Mendy Lee
- Website: https://masterboy.eu

Masterboy is a German Eurodance group best known in Europe for the hits "Feel the Heat of the Night", "Anybody (Movin' On)", "I Got to Give It Up", "Generation of Love", "Everybody Needs Somebody" and "Is This the Love".

== History ==
=== 1990-1992: The Masterboy Family ===
The group's producers, DJ's Enrico Zabler and Tommy Schleh started Masterboy in 1990 after meeting in a London club the year prior. They quickly got to work producing music for the project and released "Dance to the Beat" and "Shake It Up And Dance". At the time, the group was fronted by vocalist Mendy Lee and rapper David Atterberry. In 1991, the group released their debut album "The Masterboy Family" with "Cause We Do It Again", "Masterboy Theme", and "I Need Your Love" being released as additional supporting singles. Both Lee and Atterberry departed from the group in 1992 after "Keep On Dancing" and "Noche Del Amor" were released.

=== 1993-1994: Different Dreams ===
In 1993, the group resurfaced with new vocalist Trixi Delgado (Beatrice Obrecht), with Tommy Schleh becoming the group's new rapper while remaining as one of the group's producers. They quickly released "Fall In Trance" and "Everybody Needs Somebody" to promote their second album "Feeling Alright" to little success. "I Got to Give It Up" was the beginning of Masterboy's breakthrough in Europe in September 1993, with major continental success following the release of "Feel the Heat of the Night" and "Is This the Love" in June and October 1994 respectively. Their third album, "Different Dreams" released in 1994 brought them to the forefront of Eurodance.

=== 1995-1996: Generation of Love ===
In June 1995, the group released "Generation of Love" which brought more success on the European charts, with continued success with the release of Anybody (Movin' On)". These singles were released in preparation for the group's fourth album "Generation of Love - The Album" which was released in October 1995. In January 1996, the group released "Land Of Dreaming" to capitalize off the success of the album. The group released several remixes and produced for other Eurodance artists at this time, including Ice MC and Twenty 4 Seven. In collaboration with fellow German Eurodance groups E-Rotic, Fun Factory, Mr. President, Scooter, U96 and English boyband Worlds Apart, Masterboy formed the supergroup "Love Message" and released the single "Love Message" to raise awareness of HIV and AIDS, with funds of the single donated to charity. Later in the same year, Masterboy announced that Trixi Delgado had left the group to pursue other interests and care for her family.

=== 1996-1998: Show Me Colours ===
A few months later in July 1996, Masterboy returned with new vocalist Linda Rocco, who previously worked as a backing vocalist for Milli Vanilli and was featured in the 1992 MTV Europe Hit "Power Of American Natives" by Dance 2 Trance. The single "Mister Feeling" was released in the same month. Three months later in October 1996, the group released their fifth album, "Colours" and simultaneously released the single "Show Me Colours", with "Just For You" and "La Ola Hand In Hand" following in 1997. The former of these songs was the first time that Enrico Zabler provided vocals on a Masterboy song. After the standalone single "Dancin' Forever" was released in 1998, Rocco departed from the group.

=== 1999-2003: Further singles and disbandment ===
In June 1999, Masterboy returned once again with a new vocalist, Annabell Kay (Annabell Krischak). They released a cover of Jeanette's 1974 hit "Porque te vas". This was followed by "I Like To Like It" and "Feel The Heat 2000" which had little success on the charts. They released a Best Of compilation album at this time. Following this, Kay departed from the group. In February 2001, the group now consisting only of Enrico Zabler and Tommy Schleh released a cover of Christopher Cross's 1980 hit "Ride Like the Wind", featuring Zabler on vocals. In September 2002, Trixi Delgado reunited with the group and released "I Need A Lover Tonight" with "Feel The Heat Of The Night 2003" releasing the following year. Later in 2003, the group officially disbanded.

Enrico Zabler and Tommy Schleh continued to stay active as producers and DJs, with Trixi Delgado occasionally working on material with Schleh, which led fans to believe that the group was going to reunite once again. Several greatest hits compilation albums were released in the years following Masterboy's breakup.

=== 2013-present: Comeback ===
In 2013, Trixi Delgado, Tommy Schleh and Enrico Zabler all reunited and came back to perform as Masterboy at '90s revival shows and festivals across the world, with former vocalist Linda Rocco occasionally joining them. In 2018, they released their first single in 15 years "Are You Ready (We Love The 90s)".

== Members ==
Current

- Trixi Delgado – vocals (1993-1996, 2002-2003, 2013-present)
- Tommy Schleh – rap, music producer (1990-2003, 2013-present)
- Enrico Zabler – occasional vocals, music producer (1990-2003, 2013-present)

Former members

- Linda Rocco – vocals (1996-1998)
- Anabell Kay – vocals (1999-2000)
- Mendy Lee – vocals (1990-1992)
- David Atterberry – rap (1990-1992)

== Discography ==
=== Studio albums ===
| Title | Details | Peak chart positions | | | | |
| Title | Details | GER | FIN | FRA | SWE | SWI |
|---|---|---|---|---|---|---|
| The Masterboy Family | Release date: 19 September 1991; Label: Polydor; Formats: CD, LP | — | — | — | — | — |
| Feeling Alright | Release date:16 July 1993; Label: Polydor; Formats: CD | — | — | — | — | — |
| Different Dreams | Release date: 15 August 1994; Label: Polydor; Formats: CD | 19 | 28 | 4 | — | 23 |
| Generation of Love – The Album | Release date: 1995; Label: Club Zone; Formats: CD | 37 | 36 | 16 | — | 29 |
| Colours | Release date: 1996; Label: Club Zone; Formats: CD | 32 | — | 27 | 58 | 39 |
| Best of Masterboy | Release date: 3 July 2000; Label: Zeitgeist; Formats: CD | 54 | — | — | — | — |
"—" denotes releases that did not chart

=== Singles ===
| Year | Title | Peak chart positions | | | | | | | | | Certifications (sales thresholds) | Album |
| Year | Title | AUT | BEL (Wa) | FIN | FRA | GER | NLD | SWE | SWI | UK | Certifications (sales thresholds) | Album |
|---|---|---|---|---|---|---|---|---|---|---|---|---|
| 1990 | "Dance to the Beat" | — | — | — | — | 26 | — | — | — | — | | The Masterboy Family |
| 1991 | "Shake It Up and Dance" | — | — | — | — | 32 | — | — | — | — | | The Masterboy Family |
| 1992 | "Keep on Dancing" | — | — | — | — | — | — | — | — | — | | The Masterboy Family |
| 1992 | "Noche Del Amor" | — | — | — | — | — | — | — | — | — | | The Masterboy Family |
| 1993 | "Fall in Trance" | — | — | — | — | — | — | — | — | — | | Feeling Alright |
| 1993 | "Everybody Needs Somebody" | 24 | — | 15 | — | 41 | — | — | — | 91 | | Feeling Alright |
| 1994 | "I Got to Give It Up" | 25 | — | 17 | 41 | 13 | — | — | 17 | — | | Different Dreams |
| 1994 | "Feel the Heat of the Night" | 10 | — | — | 2 | 8 | — | 37 | 16 | 82 | | Different Dreams |
| 1994 | "Is This the Love" | 8 | — | 19 | 12 | 11 | — | 37 | 20 | — | | Different Dreams |
| 1994 | "Different Dreams" | — | — | — | 16 | — | — | — | — | — | | Different Dreams |
| 1995 | "Megamix" | — | — | — | 11 | — | — | — | — | — | | Single only |
| 1995 | "Generation of Love" | 15 | 12 | 6 | 8 | 16 | — | 20 | 19 | — | | Generation of Love – The Album |
| 1995 | "Anybody (Movin' On)" | 20 | 16 | 8 | 20 | 26 | — | 22 | 29 | 110 | | Generation of Love – The Album |
| 1995 | "Feel the Fire" | — | — | — | — | — | — | — | — | — | | Generation of Love – The Album |
| 1996 | "Land of Dreaming" | 26 | — | 15 | 22 | 12 | 19 | 32 | 20 | 80 | | Generation of Love – The Album |
| 1996 | "Mister Feeling" | 20 | — | — | — | 12 | — | — | 16 | — | | Colours |
| 1996 | "Baby Let It Be" | — | — | — | 27 | — | — | — | — | — | | Colours |
| 1996 | "Show Me Colours" | 23 | — | 10 | 31 | 24 | — | 44 | 42 | — | | Colours |
| 1997 | "Just for You" | — | — | — | — | 50 | — | — | 50 | — | | Colours |
| 1997 | "La Ola Hand in Hand" | — | — | — | — | 44 | — | — | — | — | | |
| 1998 | "Dancin' Forever" | — | — | — | — | 55 | — | — | — | — | | Single only |
| 1999 | "Porque te vas" | — | — | — | — | 26 | — | — | 21 | — | | Best of Masterboy |
| 1999 | "I Like to Like It" | — | — | — | — | 47 | — | — | 69 | — | | Best of Masterboy |
| 2000 | "Feel the Heat 2000" | — | — | — | — | 87 | — | — | — | — | | Best of Masterboy |
| 2001 | "Ride Like the Wind" | — | — | — | — | — | — | — | — | — | | Singles only |
| 2002 | "I Need a Lover Tonight" | — | — | — | — | 72 | — | — | — | — | | Singles only |
| 2003 | "Feel the Heat of the Night 2003" | 51 | — | — | — | 67 | — | — | — | — | | Singles only |
| 2018 | "Are You Ready (We Love the 90s)" | — | — | — | — | — | — | — | — | — | | Singles only |
"*" denotes unknown peak positions "—" denotes releases that did not chart
