= Två av oss =

Single by X-models
- A-side: "Fantasi"
- B-side: "Slut"
- Released: 1981
- Genre: pop
- Label: Parlophone
- Songwriter: Efva Attling

"Två av oss" is a song written by Efva Attling, which was recorded by X-models and released as a single in 1981. It was a Svensktoppen hit for ten weeks between 29 November 1981 – 7 March 1982, peaking at number four.

The X-models' single is one of the titles in the 2009 book Tusen svenska klassiker.

== Charts ==
| Chart (1981–1982) | Peak position |
|---|---|
| Sweden (Sverigetopplistan) | 1 |
