= Tommy Schleh =

German DJ

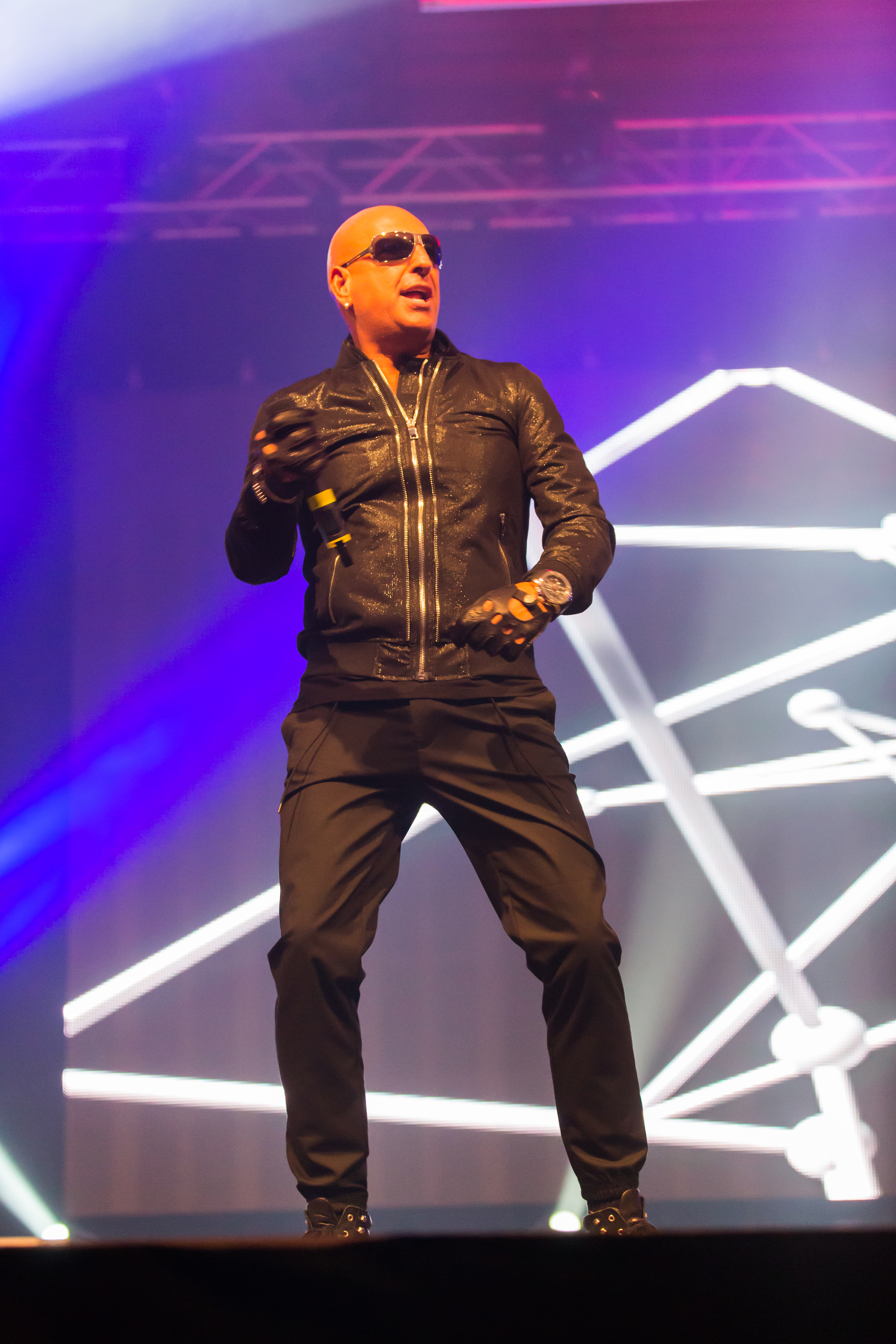
Tommy Schleh with Masterboy in Mannheim (2014)

Thomas Jürgen Schleh (born 10 December 1964, in Neckarbischofsheim), known under his stage names as Tommy Schleh and DJ Klubbingman, is a Eurodance DJ and producer. He is a member of the group Masterboy.

== Masterboy ==
In 1989, he and Enrico Zabler started working on dance music sounds. Their Eurodance group Masterboy was highly popular during the 1990s.

In 1999, his solo single "Welcome to the Club" was a success, along with "Living on a Better World".

== Kinki Palace club ==
Since the age of 17, he has been working as a DJ. Today he owns the dance club Kinki Palace in Sinsheim in southwest Germany, where he still occasionally produces techno sounds himself.

As of 2009, his productions are broadcast weekly on the radio station Sunshine Live (every Tuesday from 8 to 12 pm).

== Solo singles ==
- "Dreaming for a Better World"
- "Welcome to the Club"
- "Open Your Mind"
- "Highway to the Sky"
- "No Limit (On the Beach)"
- "Magic Summer Night"
- "We Call It Revolution" (feat. Trixi Delgado)
- "Love Message" (feat. Trixi Delgado)
- "Ride on a White Train" (feat. Trixi Delgado)
- "Another Day, Another Night" (feat. Trixi Delgado)
