= Generation of Love =

Single by Masterboy

from the album Generation of Love
- B-side: "Remix"
- Released: June 2, 1995
- Recorded: 1994
- Genre: Eurodance
- Length: 3:40
- Label: Barclay; Polydor
- Songwriters: Beatrice Obrecht; Tommy Schleh; Luke Skywalker; Enrico Zabler
- Producer: Masterboy

Masterboy singles chronology
"Is This the Love" (1994)	"Generation of Love" (1995)	"Anybody (Movin' On)" (1995)

Music video
- "Generation of Love" on YouTube

"Generation of Love" is a song recorded by German band Masterboy. It was released in June 1995, by Barclay and Polydor Records, as the first single from their fourth album of the same name (1995). The female vocals are performed by band member Trixi Delgado. The song is one of the band's most successful singles in terms of peak positions on the charts. It achieved success in many European countries, particularly in Finland, where it peaked at number six and in France, where it peaked at number eight and stayed on the chart (top-50) for 13 weeks. The song was also a hit in Austria and in Belgium (Wallonia), where it remained ranked in the top-40 for 18 weeks. On the Eurochart Hot 100, "Generation of Love" reached number 35. In 2006, it was re-released in a remixed version featuring Freedom Williams and Linda Rocco, but was less successful. This version is included on Masterboy's 2006 studio album US-Album. The artwork of the remixes used the same picture, but with different colours (red, blue, gray).

== Music video ==
The accompanying music video for "Generation of Love" was directed by Jonathan Bate in summer of 1995 and filmed in Oil-Factory Studios, London. It was A-listed on German music television channel VIVA in July 1995.

== Track listings ==
- CD maxi
1. "Generation of Love" (radio edit – ipanema mix) – 3:38
2. "Generation of Love" (ipanema maxi version) – 5:51
3. "Generation of Love" (radio edit – mondo mix) – 4:08
4. "Generation of Love" (mondo maxi version) – 5:50
- CD maxi
1. "Generation of Love" (ipanema maxi version) – 5:51
2. "Generation of Love" (mondo maxi version) – 5:50
3. "Masterboy mega mix" – 7:30
- CD maxi – Remixes
1. "Generation of Love" (generated airplay mix) – 4:06
2. "Generation of Love" (generated mix) – 7:29
3. "Generation of Love" (robotnico acid house mix) – 5:01
4. "Generation of Love" (fly away mix) – 6:02
- 12" maxi
1. "Generation of Love" (mondo maxi version) – 5:50
2. "Generation of Love" (ipanema maxi version) – 5:51
- CD single
1. "Generation of Love" (radio edit) – 3:40
2. "Generation of Love" (ipanema maxi version) – 5:51

== Credits ==
- Music : Zabler, Schleh and Obrecht
- Words : Zabler, Schleh and Skywalker
- Published by Session Musikverlag / Warner Chappell
- Produced by "Masterboy Beat Production" at Session Studios Walldorf
- Mixed by T. Engelhard and "Masterboy Beat Production"
- Mastered by J. Quincy Kramer, Polygram Hamburg
- Photography by Julia Maloof
- Designed by Goutte

== Charts ==
=== Weekly charts ===
Chart (1995)	Peak position
Austria (Ö3 Austria Top 40)	15
Belgium (Ultratop 50 Wallonia)	12
Europe (Eurochart Hot 100)	35
Finland (Suomen virallinen lista)	6
France (SNEP)	8
Germany (GfK)	16
Israel (Israeli Singles Chart)	5
Sweden (Sverigetopplistan)	20
Switzerland (Schweizer Hitparade)	19

=== Year-end charts ===
Chart (1995)	Position
Belgium (Ultratop 50 Wallonia)	67
Europe (Eurochart Hot 100)	99
France (SNEP)	53
