= The Game Bakers =

French independent video game studio

- Type: Private
- Industry: Video games
- Founded: 2010
- Headquarters: Montpellier, France
- Products: Squids, Furi, Haven, Cairn
- Website: www.thegamebakers.com/

The Game Bakers is an independent game studio based in Montpellier, France. The company was known for creating video games for mobile devices including Squids and Combo Crew, but shifted their focus to console and PC games, with Furi which was released in 2016. At Summer Game Fest in 2024, they announced their latest game Cairn, a survival-climbing game which was released in January 2026.

== History ==
The Game Bakers were formed in 2010 by two former employees of Ubisoft, who worked on AAA licenses, Emeric Thoa and Audrey Leprince. The idea was to "make games as we cook: with a lot of love." The Game Bakers started by developing games for mobile devices and then decided to focus on console and computer games. In 2016, they released Furi.

== Games developed ==
Title	Year	Platform(s)
Squids	2011	iOS, Android, PC, Mac
Squids Wild West	2012	iOS, Android
Combo Crew	2013	iOS, Android
Squids Odyssey	2014	Microsoft Windows, Wii U, Nintendo 3DS, Nintendo Switch
Teenage Mutant Ninja Turtles: Brothers Unite	2014	iOS, Android
Furi	2016	PlayStation 4, Microsoft Windows, Xbox One, Nintendo Switch, PlayStation 5
Haven	2020	Microsoft Windows, Nintendo Switch, PlayStation 4, PlayStation 5, Xbox One, Xbox Series X/S
Furi:Demake - The Chain	2023	Microsoft Windows
Cairn	2026	Microsoft Windows, PlayStation 5, Nintendo Switch 2

=== Awards ===
- EIGD Art Direction Award – Squids
- Apple's Editor Choice – Combo Crew
