= The Game Awards 2026 =

Video game awards show

- Date: December 10, 2026
- Venue: Peacock Theater, Los Angeles
- Country: United States
- Hosted by: Geoff Keighley
- Preshow host: Sydnee Goodman

Highlights
- Most nominations: Grand Theft Auto VI (8)
- Website: thegameawards.com

Online coverage
- Produced by: Geoff Keighley; Kimmie Kim
- Directed by: Richard Preuss

The Game Awards 2026 is an upcoming award show set to honor the best video games of 2026. It will be the thirteenth show hosted by Geoff Keighley, creator and producer of the Game Awards, set to be held with a live audience at the Peacock Theater in Los Angeles on December 10, 2026, and live streamed across online platforms globally.

== Background ==
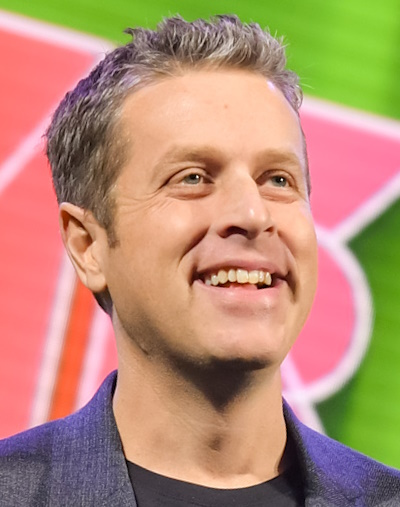
Host and producer Geoff Keighley

As with previous iterations of the Game Awards, the 2026 show will be hosted and produced by Canadian games journalist Geoff Keighley. He returned as an executive producer alongside Kimmie Kim, while Richard Preuss returned as director and LeRoy Bennett as creative director, joined by Lara Karchmer as co-executive producer. The presentation is set to take place at the Peacock Theater in Los Angeles on December 10, 2026. Public tickets became available for purchase on October 29.

The event will be live streamed across online platforms including Instagram Live, TikTok, Twitch, Twitter, Steam, and YouTube, as well as Disney+, Live TV on PS5, and Roblox for the first time. It will be streamed on several platforms throughout Asia, including more than 20 in China. Disney's participation as a streaming partner supports promotion for its new video game and television productions, while the Roblox broadcast is the first external awards show to be streamed within the video game. Keighley is interested in expanding the show to new platforms without limiting any to exclusivity, despite several offers to do so.

== Nominees ==
Nominees were announced on November 17, 2026. Any game released for public consumption on or before November 20 was eligible for consideration, including early access games, downloadable content (DLC), expansions, remakes, remasters, and seasonal content. The nominees were compiled by a jury panel composed of members from 160 media outlets globally, and specialized juries decide nominees for categories like adaptation, nineteen specialists for accessibility, and nine for esports. Winners are determined between the jury (90 percent) and public voting (10 percent); the latter is held via the official website and within Roblox (Note: In China, fan voting is held via platforms such as Bilibili.) until December 9. The exception is the publicly voted Players' Voice, for which any game released on or before November 30 is eligible. A new category, Best User Creation, was introduced, recognizing experiences, servers, and mods created by community members.

Keighley refuted suggestions that the eligibility date was adjusted to accommodate for Rockstar Games's Grand Theft Auto VI (released on November 19), noting that the show follows the same calendar as previous years. Several viewers and journalists recognized the unusuality of the game's multiple nominations days before its public release; the jury had early access to the game. It secured nominations in most of its eligible categories, including every major craft award. Manni L. Perez's Best Performance nomination marked the first official confirmation of her role in the game.

Five of the six Game of the Year nominees are action-adventure games, while the other is action, and most were self-published by their developers. 2026 marked the first year since the inaugural show in 2014 that Sony Interactive Entertainment did not receive a Game of the Year nomination, and the first since 2023 that an independent game was not nominated. Most other categories have five nominees each, expanding to six in the event of a tie, as occurred with three awards in 2026 (Games for Impact, Best Action / Adventure Game, and Best Multiplayer Game). ZywOo's Best Esports Athlete nomination is his fifth consecutive and sixth overall.

=== Awards ===
==== Media ====
Game of the Year	Best Game Direction
007 First Light – IO Interactive; Control Resonant – Remedy Entertainment; Grand Theft Auto VI – Rockstar Games; The Legend of Zelda: Ocarina of Time – Nintendo; Phantom Blade Zero – S-Game; Resident Evil Requiem – Capcom	Control Resonant – Remedy Entertainment; Grand Theft Auto VI – Rockstar Games; Pragmata – Capcom; Phantom Blade Zero – S-Game; Resident Evil Requiem – Capcom
Best Narrative	Best Art Direction
007 First Light – IO Interactive; The Blood of Dawnwalker – Rebel Wolves / Bandai Namco Entertainment; Control Resonant – Remedy Entertainment; Grand Theft Auto VI – Rockstar Games; Resident Evil Requiem – Capcom	Control Resonant – Remedy Entertainment; Grand Theft Auto VI – Rockstar Games; Mouse: P.I. for Hire – Fumi Games / PlaySide Studios; Phantom Blade Zero – S-Game; The Legend of Zelda: Ocarina of Time – Nintendo
Best Score and Music (Note: Presented in conjunction with Spotify)	Best Audio Design
Ace Combat 8: Wings of Theve – Bandai Namco Aces / Bandai Namco Entertainment; Grand Theft Auto VI – Rockstar Games; The Legend of Zelda: Ocarina of Time – Nintendo; Mixtape – Beethoven & Dinosaur / Annapurna Interactive; Phantom Blade Zero – S-Game	Ace Combat 8: Wings of Theve – Bandai Namco Aces / Bandai Namco Entertainment; Control Resonant – Remedy Entertainment; Grand Theft Auto VI – Rockstar Games; Resident Evil Requiem – Capcom; Star Wars: Galactic Racer – Fuse Games / Secret Mode
Best Performance	Games for Impact
Angela Sant'Albano as Grace Ashcroft – Resident Evil Requiem; Liam McIntyre as Wolverine – Marvel's Wolverine; Manni L. Perez as Lucia Caminos – Grand Theft Auto VI; Patrick Gibson as James Bond – 007 First Light; Rahul Kohli as Arjun Devraj – Saros	Big Walk – House House / Panic; Cairn – The Game Bakers; Forever Ago – Third Shift / Annapurna Interactive; Life Is Strange: Reunion – Deck Nine / Square Enix; lily's world XD – SonderingEmily / Kwalee; Mixtape – Beethoven & Dinosaur / Annapurna Interactive
Best Independent Game	Best Debut Indie Game
Big Walk – House House / Panic; Cairn – The Game Bakers; Denshattack! – Undercoders / Fireshine Games; Mewgenics – Edmund McMillen, Tyler Glaiel; Mina the Hollower – Yacht Club Games	Dressmaker – Cozy Lives / Free Lives; Esoteric Ebb – Christoffer Bodegård / Raw Fury; Orbitals – Shapefarm / Kepler Interactive; Replaced – Sad Cat Studios / Thunderful Publishing; Silver Pines – Wych Elm / Team17
Best Ongoing Game	Best Community Support
ARC Raiders – Embark Studios; Final Fantasy XIV – Square Enix; Fortnite – Epic Games; No Man's Sky – Hello Games; The Witcher 3: Wild Hunt – CD Projekt Red	Crimson Desert – Pearl Abyss; Helldivers II – Arrowhead Game Studios / Sony Interactive Entertainment; No Man's Sky – Hello Games; Warframe – Digital Extremes; The Witcher 3: Wild Hunt – CD Projekt Red
Best Mobile Game	Best VR / AR Game
Arknights: Endfield – Hypergryph / Gryphline; Monster Hunter Outlanders – TiMi Studio Group / Level Infinite; Neverness to Everness – Hotta Studio / Perfect World Games; Pokémon Champions – The Pokémon Works / The Pokémon Company; Where Winds Meet – Everstone Studio / NetEase Games	Forefront – Triangle Factory; Into the Radius 2 – CM Immersive; Little Nightmares VR: Altered Echoes – Iconik / Bandai Namco Entertainment; Teenage Mutant Ninja Turtles: Empire City – Cortopia Studios / Beyond Frames; Thief VR: Legacy of Shadow – Maze Theory / Vertigo Games
Best Action Game	Best Action / Adventure Game
Ace Combat 8: Wings of Theve – Bandai Namco Aces / Bandai Namco Entertainment; Gears of War: E-Day – The Coalition / Xbox Game Studios; Onimusha: Way of the Sword – Capcom; Phantom Blade Zero – S-Game; Saros – Housemarque / Sony Interactive Entertainment	007 First Light – IO Interactive; Control Resonant – Remedy Entertainment; Grand Theft Auto VI – Rockstar Games; The Legend of Zelda: Ocarina of Time – Nintendo; Pragmata – Capcom; Resident Evil Requiem – Capcom
Best Role Playing Game	Best Fighting Game
The Blood of Dawnwalker – Rebel Wolves / Bandai Namco Entertainment; Final Fantasy Resonance – Lancarse / Square Enix; Fire Emblem: Fortune's Weave – Intelligent Systems / Nintendo; Monster Hunter Stories 3: Twisted Reflection – Capcom; Trails in the Sky 2nd Chapter – Nihon Falcom / GungHo Online Entertainment	2XKO – Riot Games; Avatar Legends: The Fighting Game – Gameplay Group International / Paramount Games Studio; Invincible VS – Quarter Up / Skybound Games; Marvel Tōkon: Fighting Souls – Arc System Works / Sony Interactive Entertainment; My Hero Academia: All's Justice – Byking / Bandai Namco Entertainment
Best Family Game	Best Sim / Strategy Game
Big Walk – House House / Panic; Lego Batman: Legacy of the Dark Knight – TT Games / Warner Bros. Games; Nintendo Switch Sports Resort – Nintendo; Pokémon Pokopia – Game Freak, Omega Force / Nintendo; Yoshi and the Mysterious Book – Good-Feel / Nintendo	Mewgenics – Edmund McMillen, Tyler Glaiel; Planet Zoo 2 – Frontier Developments; Pokémon Pokopia – Game Freak, Omega Force / Nintendo; Slay the Spire II – Mega Crit; Star Wars Zero Company – Bit Reactor / Electronic Arts
Best Sports / Racing Game	Best Multiplayer Game
EA Sports FC 27 – EA Vancouver, EA Romania / Electronic Arts; Forza Horizon 6 – Playground Games / Xbox Game Studios; Nintendo Switch Sports Resort – Nintendo; Screamer – Milestone; Star Wars: Galactic Racer – Fuse Games / Secret Mode	Big Walk – House House / Panic; Call of Duty: Modern Warfare 4 – Infinity Ward / Activision; Gears of War: E-Day – The Coalition / Xbox Game Studios; Marathon – Bungie; Meccha Chameleon – Lemorion_1224; Orbitals – Shapefarm / Kepler Interactive
Innovation in Accessibility	Most Anticipated Game
Assassin's Creed Black Flag Resynced – Ubisoft Singapore / Ubisoft; Forza Horizon 6 – Playground Games / Xbox Game Studios; Gears of War: E-Day – The Coalition / Xbox Game Studios; Marvel's Wolverine – Insomniac Games / Sony Interactive Entertainment; Rhythm Heaven Groove – Nintendo	Fable – Playground Games / Xbox Game Studios; Final Fantasy VII Revelation – Square Enix; God of War Laufey – Santa Monica Studio / Sony Interactive Entertainment; Resident Evil Veronica – Capcom; The Witcher IV – CD Projekt Red
Best User Creation	Players' Voice (Note: 100 percent public-voted award with a three-round nomination process that begins with 30 games)
A Dream of Silence ReVamped – Lizardpunk (Baldur's Gate 3); Create Aeronautics – Simulated Team (Minecraft); nopixel V – Nopixel Studios (Grand Theft Auto Online); Star Wars Droid Tycoon – FOAD (Fortnite); TTK – Sable Digital (Roblox)	TBD
Best Adaptation (Note: Awarded to media based on video games)
Cyberpunk: Edgerunners 2 (anime series) – Trigger, CD Projekt Red / Netflix; based on Cyberpunk 2077 by CD Projekt Red; Fallout season 2 (television series) – Kilter Films, Bethesda Game Studios / Amazon MGM Studios; based on Fallout by Bethesda Softworks; Mortal Kombat II (feature film) – New Line Cinema, Atomic Monster / Warner Bros. Pictures; based on Mortal Kombat by Midway Games; Resident Evil (feature film) – Constantin Film, PlayStation Productions / Columbia Pictures; based on Resident Evil by Capcom; The Super Mario Galaxy Movie (animated film) – Illumination, Nintendo / Universal Pictures; based on Mario by Nintendo

==== Esports and creators ====
Best Esports Game	Best Esports Athlete
Counter-Strike 2 – Valve; Dota 2 – Valve; League of Legends – Riot Games; Mobile Legends: Bang Bang – Moonton; Valorant – Riot Games	Jung "Chovy" Ji-hoon (Gen.G); Danil "donk" Kryshkovets (Team Spirit); Roberto "erde" Lobos (Loud); Ilya "Yatoro" Mulyarchuk (Team Spirit); Mathieu "ZywOo" Herbaut (Team Vitality)
Best Esports Team	Content Creator of the Year
Gen.G (League of Legends); Loud (Valorant); Team Falcons (Counter-Strike 2); Team Falcons (Rocket League); Team Spirit (Dota 2); Team Vitality (Counter-Strike 2)	CDawg; Cellbit; IShowSpeed; lilsimsie; OhnePixel

=== Multiple nominations ===
Grand Theft Auto VI received the most nominations at the show with eight, followed by Control Resonant and Resident Evil Requiem with six. Nintendo was the most nominated publisher with 12 nominations, followed by Capcom with 11 and Rockstar Games with eight. All Best Esports Team nominees had at least one member nominated for Best Esports Athlete (Team Spirit had two) and Team Falcons received two Best Esports Team nominations (one each for its Counter-Strike 2 and Rocket League divisions).

Games that received multiple nominations
Nominations	Game
8	Grand Theft Auto VI
6	Control Resonant
6	Resident Evil Requiem
5	Phantom Blade Zero
4	007 First Light
4	Big Walk
4	The Legend of Zelda: Ocarina of Time
3	Ace Combat 8: Wings of Theve
3	Gears of War: E-Day
2	The Blood of Dawnwalker
2	Cairn
2	Forza Horizon 6
2	Marvel's Wolverine
2	Mewgenics
2	Mixtape
2	Nintendo Switch Sports Resort
2	No Man's Sky
2	Orbitals
2	Pokémon Pokopia
2	Pragmata
2	Saros
2	Star Wars: Galactic Racer
2	The Witcher 3: Wild Hunt

Nominations by publisher
Nominations	Publisher
12	Nintendo (Note: Nintendo received an additional nomination as co-producer of The Super Mario Galaxy Movie for Best Adaptation.)
11	Capcom
8	Rockstar Games
7	Bandai Namco Entertainment
7	Sony Interactive Entertainment
6	Remedy Entertainment
6	Xbox Game Studios
5	S-Game
4	IO Interactive
4	Panic
4	Square Enix
3	Annapurna Interactive (Note: Some outlets counted Annapurna Interactive's nominations at nine as its sister company, Annapurna Pictures, partly financed Control Resonant.)
3	CD Projekt Red (Note: CD Projekt Red received an additional nomination as co-producer of Cyberpunk: Edgerunners 2 for Best Adaptation.)
3	Riot Games
2	Electronic Arts
2	The Game Bakers
2	Hello Games
2	Kepler Interactive
2	Secret Mode
2	Valve

== Reception ==
Critics noted the lack of independent games nominated for Game of the Year, especially after three were nominated the previous year; GameSpot's Alessandro Barbosa highlighted Big Walk, Cairn, Mewgenics, and Mina the Hollower among the strongest contenders, citing their higher Metacritic scores over the final nominees. Some journalists felt Marathon and World of Warcraft: Forever were deserving of Best Art Direction and Best Ongoing Game nominations, respectively.
