= Smeargle =

Pokémon species

- Pokémon character
- Smeargle artwork by Ken Sugimori
- First game: Pokémon Gold and Silver (1999)
- Designed by: Ken Sugimori (finalized)
- Voiced by: Koichi Sakaguchi; Kenta Okuma (Pokémon the Movie: The Power of Us); Aoi Gōda (Monpoké)

In-universe information
- Species: Pokémon
- Type: Normal

Smeargle (/ˈsmɪrɡəl/), known in Japan as Doble (Japanese: ドーブル, Hepburn: Dōburu), is a Pokémon species in Nintendo and Game Freak's Pokémon franchise. Smeargle first appeared in the video games Pokémon Gold and Silver and most of its subsequent sequels. Designed by Game Freak's development team and finalized by Ken Sugimori, it has also appeared in various spin-off titles, such as Pokémon Go and the Pokémon Trading Card Game, Pokémon Pokopia, and animated adaptations of the franchise, where it is primarily voiced by Koichi Sakaguchi.

Resembling a Beagle with a beret-shaped head and a paintbrush at the end of its tail, Smeargle is classified as a Normal-type Pokémon. In the franchise's fictional universe, it uses paint-like fluid that flows from its tail to paint, creating paint markings and graffiti to mark its territory. It has the signature move, Sketch, which allows it to permanently learn almost any move used by its opponent. An additional variant of Smeargle, named Smearguru, was introduced for the video game Pokémon Pokopia.

Since its debut, Smeargle has been used to promote various merchandise as well as in a variety of collaborations with events and brands, including Expo 2025 and Van Gogh Museum. Its design has been received positively by critics and fans, with some comparing it to the Pokémon Grafaiai. Sketch caused Smeargle to receive prominent use in competitive play, going on to win to multiple tournaments as well as being banned in certain tournaments due to its overuse and unpredictability.

== Concept and creation ==
Smeargle is a species of fictional creatures called Pokémon created for the Pokémon media franchise. Developed by Game Freak and published by Nintendo, the Japanese franchise began in 1996 with the video games Pokémon Red and Green for the Game Boy, which were later released in North America as Pokémon Red and Blue in 1998. In these games and their sequels, the player assumes the role of a Trainer whose goal is to capture and use the creatures' special abilities to combat other Pokémon. Some Pokémon can transform into stronger species through evolution via various means, such as exposure to specific items. Each Pokémon has one or two elemental types, which define its advantages and disadvantages when battling other Pokémon. A major goal in each game is to complete the Pokédex, a comprehensive Pokémon encyclopedia, by capturing, evolving, and trading with other Trainers to obtain individuals from all Pokémon species.

Smeargle was first introduced in Pokémon Gold and Silver. When developing the games, around 300 individual Pokémon designs were drafted by various development team members, with each deciding their names and features and revising the drafts as needed. During this process, the team actively tried to avoid vague design concepts, as they felt this had caused difficulty creating completed Pokémon during the development of Red and Blue. As the team selected which Pokémon would be included, they were drawn and finalized by lead artist Ken Sugimori. To maintain balance, however, many of the newer species did not appear in the early stages of the game. Additionally, many of the Pokémon were designed with merchandise in mind, taking into account the related Pokémon toy line and anime series. As a result, designs often had to be kept simplistic, something that caused strain for Sugimori and affected his approach to the next Pokémon franchise titles, Pokémon Ruby and Sapphire. Compared to the species introduced in the first generation, many of the second generation species have more obvious origins based on animals, plants or myths; they were also designed with a rural Japanese influence due to a significant amount being based on animals known to live in "temperate forest environment."

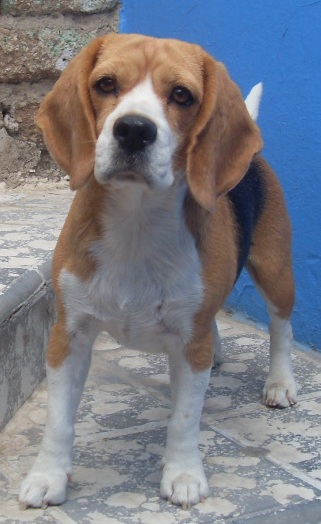
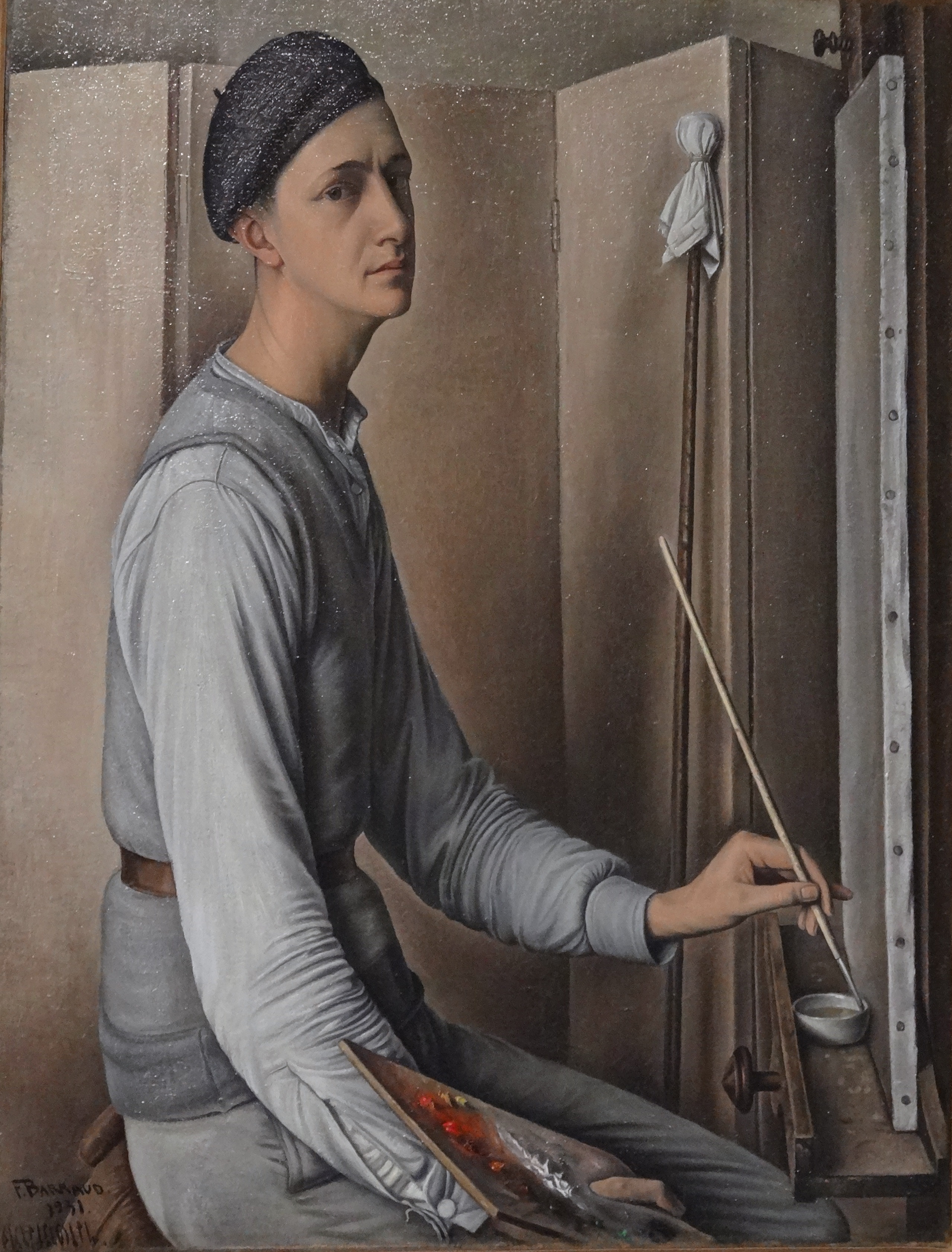
Smeargle is believed to be based on the Beagle dog breed as well as the French artist stereotype due to its beret-shaped head.

Smeargle is a bipedal dog-like Pokémon with floppy ears, a beret-shaped head and a brown collar around its neck. Once an adult, it will allow fellow Smeargle to plant footprints on its back. It has an elongated tail which ends in paintbrush-like structure. Though commonly depicted as green, different colored paint-like fluids are secreted from the tip of its tail, with the color predetermined for each individual Smeargle. A Smeargle's emotions can determine the hue of the fluid. Its shiny form gives Smeargle a golden tint and turns the colored fluid on its tail from green to orange; prior to the third generation, Smeargle's standard and shiny color schemes were reversed. Smeargle is believed to be based on the Beagle breed, with additional origins to French artist stereotype due to its beret. Smeargle's English name is a combination of "smear" and "beagle". Its Korean name, Lubeudo (루브도), is believed to originate from the Korean spelling and pronunciation of the French art museum Musée du Louvre.

In-universe, it uses its tail like a paintbrush in order to paint, using one of five-thousand different paint markings to mark its territory. In towns populated with Smeargle, the walls are typically covered in graffiti. Smeargle is only capable of naturally learning the move "Sketch", its signature move, which it learns ten times. When used in battle, Smeargle is able to permanently learn the move last learnt by the opposing Pokémon. However, the move can only be used once per battle.

== Appearances ==
Smeargle first appeared in the 1999 video game Pokémon Gold and Silver; it is classified as a Normal-type Pokémon with only one stage, meaning it has no pre-evolutions and is not known to evolve. Smeargle are an uncommon encounter; in its debut appearance, it can only be encountered in the wild at the Ruins of Alph, secluded to a remote island where the player needs to use another Pokémon to access it. A similar encounter can occur in Pokémon Emerald, only appearing in the Artisan Cave. It has since gone on to appear in multiple games, including the enhanced version of Gold and Silver, Pokémon Crystal, and the remakes Pokémon HeartGold and SoulSilver. During Golden Week in 2006, Japanese Pokémon Centers distributed Smeargle to customers who brought in their copy of Ruby, Sapphire, Emerald, FireRed or LeafGreen. In Pokémon Sun and Moon and its enhanced versions, a Smeargle is used by Trial Captain Ilima as his ace Pokémon, who teaches it a move that is strong against the player's Starter Pokémon. Although initially absent from Pokémon Scarlet and Violet, it was later added in The Indigo Disk DLC expansion pack. Artwork of Smeargle also appears on a poster in Pokémon Legends: Z-A.

Smeargle can be seen in other spin-off Pokémon video games, such as Pokémon Stadium 2, Pokémon Colosseum, Pokémon Rumble World, and Pokémon Smile. Pokémon Channel features a Smeargle-themed TV show, Smeargle's Art Show; the player can paint on still scenes of various programs within the game, in which a Smeargle will display the art in an art gallery. In Pokémon Mystery Dungeon: Blue Rescue Team and Red Rescue Team and its 2020 remake, a Smeargle can be recruited onto the Rescue Team after saving it from the Howling Forest area during a quest. He can also create new flag designs for the team. It would later re-appear in the games' sequels Pokémon Mystery Dungeon: Explorers of Time, Explorers of Darkness and Explorers of Sky. During Pokémon Battle Revolution, a Smeargle is used by two different opponents during Colosseum mode. Whilst initially missing from the lineup of second generation Pokémon added to Pokémon Go, speculated to be due to its signature move, it was eventually added during an update in 2019. Unlike most Pokémon, Smeargle can only be encountered through Go's Snapshot mode, where by using the camera on another Pokémon, a Smeargle will occasionally photobomb the image before appearing on the in-game map for the chance to catch it. Its shiny form also has the chance to appear during in-game events, such as during a promotional event for New Pokémon Snap. Pokémon Pokopia introduced a new variant of Smeargle called Smearguru, where multiple colors from its tail are splashed all over its body, making it look more like a painter. In Super Smash Bros. Ultimate, Smeargle appears as a collectable in the form of a spirit. To obtain the Smeargle spirit, the player is required to beat a pre-set match against an Inkling from the Splatoon series.

It has been featured in multiple card sets in the Pokémon Trading Card Game. In the 2021 set Sword & Shield–Evolving Skies, a card depicting a Smeargle leaving a green paint trail with its tail; the paint trail connects other cards within the same set as well as the set Sword & Shield–Fusion Strike and Japanese exclusive set Eevee Heroes by having other cards depict other Pokémon species observing it. Smeargle would later prominently feature in the Pokémon Go set, acting as a mascot for the set as well as referencing its function in Go. Some cards as well as an emblem appearing in the mobile game Pokémon Trading Card Game Pocket. A secret mission dedicated to Smeargle, called "Smeargle's Colorful Collection", also appears in Pocket. Smeargle has appeared in multiple episodes of Pokémon: The Series primarily as a background cameo, although it has appeared prominently as the focus of the episodes "The Art of Pokémon" and "Smashing with Sketch!". In the series, it is voiced by Koichi Sakaguchi. Smeargle has also had roles in the short film Pikachu & Pichu and the feature film Pokémon the Movie: The Power of Us, with the latter being voiced by Kenta Okuma [ja] (大隈健太).

=== Promotions ===
Smeargle has been featured on a number of merchandise, such as a figurine, a shirt, and plushes. In 2019, a menu item based on Smeargle, the "Smeargle Drawing Pancakes", were added at the Japan exclusive Pokémon Café; the dish allowed customers to draw on pancakes using a chocolate pen. The pancakes was later removed from the menu in January 2020. It had a program at the Japanese Pokémon EXPO Gym at Expocity [ja] (EXPOCITY) in Suita, Osaka called "Smeargle's Promo Studio", where a Smeargle invites participants to audition as backup dancers for a promotional video for its debut in battles. Smeargle was one of a handful of Pokémon picked to represent "monpoké", The Pokémon Company's brand targeted for babies and toddlers; being featured on merchandise such as T-shirts, finger puppets, plushies, charms, and picture books. As part of this promotion, Smeargle appeared in a tie-in short anime series on the Japanese Pokémon Kids TV YouTube channel, as well as a web series titled Fun Times on monpoké Island, which used puppets. The Smeargle was voiced by Aoi Gōda [ja] (合田葵).

Smeargle has also been used in a number of collaborations with other companies and events. Between July 2019 and June 2020, Tokyo Monorail operated "Pokémon Monorail", which were Tokyo Monorail 1000 series units decorated with Pokémon-themed liveries; Car 6 of Pokémon Monorails featured a Smeargle with a group of Pikachu. In 2022, a Smeargle card was one of multiple Pokémon Trading Card available in Happy Meals as part of a collaboration with McDonald's. This collaboration was extended into 2023 in Latin American countries. As part of a collaboration with the Van Gogh Museum in 2023, promotional trading cards were distributed depicting Smeargle, Pikachu, Eevee and Sunflora replicating paintings by Vincent van Gogh, with Smeargle's card based on Self-Portrait as a Painter (December 1887 – February 1888, F522). A statue of Smeargle was erected at the venue of at Expo 2025 in Osaka, Japan as part of a collaboration with Pokémon Go, with the statue being used as part of an in-game stamp rally.

== Reception ==
Smeargle has received positive reception from both critics and fans, with writers from Inverse and Paste considering the species a highlight of the Pokémon introduced in the second generation. RPGFan's Pocket Squirrel used Smeargle's ability to learn any move with Sketch as an example of the variety of different moves Pokémon games have, comparing it to Strago Magus from Final Fantasy VI. It became a symbol for artists in the community, with a popular Brazilian Facebook group dedicated to Pokémon fan artists, Casa do Smeargle (Smeargle's House), naming the group after the species. However, some critics found the paintbrush tail concept to be unappealing, with IGN writer Jack DeVries finding the concept disgusting and questioned what the fluid from its tail is made of. Artist Christopher Stoll created fan art on what an anatomically realistic Smeargle would look like, depicting the tail as housing intestinal tissue connected to its anal glands; Darryn Bonthuys and Hope Bellingham from GameSpot and GamesRadar+ respectively described the concept as gross and cursed, with Bonthuys adding that it was "pure nightmare fuel".

Some critics had compared Smeargle with another Pokémon, Grafaiai, due to the focus on art. During Grafaiai's initial teaser, both journalists and fans believed it to be a regional variant of Smeargle.

During the initial teaser reveal for the ninth generation Pokémon Grafaiai, both fans and journalists speculated it to originally be a regional variant, a form of a Pokémon native to a specific region, or an evolution of Smeargle. Following the full reveal of Grafaiai, some critics were happy that it was unrelated to Smeargle, either due to fatigue of the regional variant gimmick, or thinking that Grafaiai was a good take on the artist Pokémon concept; however, some fans were disappointed more was not done with Smeargle instead. Some believed the two to be a duo or competitive rivals, with The Mary Sue's Madeline Carpou believing Smeargle and Grafaiai would have tension between each other due to the former's status as being the only "Art Student Pokémon", with Carpou adding that Grafaiai was "the Cooler Smeargle" and one of the best designs in the series. Andrea Trama in an article for Game Rant pointed out how similar the two species were, pointing out how Grafaiai's signature move Doodle, which allows it to copy an opponent Pokémon's ability, was similar to Smeargle's Sketch; he further questioned if it could lead a similar legacy during competitive play.

=== Competitive play ===
Smeargle gained particular attention for its use in competitive play. Despite some writers critiquing Smeargle for its weak stats or for finding its gimmick confusing, the species became a popular choice among players for 1v1 battles due to its signature move, Sketch. Players used Sketch to make their Smeargle learn advantageous moves such as Spore, which can induce sleep. Screen Rant writer Scott Baird noted that although the species is considered to have subpar stats, its ability to learn status inflicting moves that are otherwise only available to a small group of other species makes Smeargle "one of the most powerful Pokémon in the series". Due to the species being able to learn any move, it is considered to be a wild card, Due to its wide potential, Smeargle was often excluded from use in tournaments such as "Pokémon Go Holiday Cup Little Edition" in 2023. Some players expressed concern when it was made available in 2024 due to its reintroduction due to finding it hard to counter.

Smeargle has seen significant success in tournaments in Japan, being used by the winning team of the "Elementary School and Under League" at the Pokémon League DP 2007 Japan Championship, winners T.R. and Kentaro Shiratori at the Pokémon World Championships 2010, winner Tashiro Kota at the 2nd Pokémon Ryuo Tournament, and Yuuma Kinugawa at the Pokémon Japan Championships 2025. In an interview with Famitsu, Kinugawa mentioned that he liked Smeargle and it was the reason he got into competitive Pokémon due to one that his brother owned. Smeargle has also been used on teams that have caused major upsets, where it was used in combination with Pokémon such as Palossand and Eevee to beat high ranking players.

A notorious strategy that saw use from many competitive players was teaching Smeargle the move Dark Void, the signature move of the Pokémon Darkrai; the move puts all opponents to sleep, which allowed the player to use to switch to a stronger Pokémon to deal damage, with a popular choice to tag-team into being the Pokémon Kyogre. Even though the strategy did not have many options in order to counter it, according to competitive player Toler Webb, even the few counters it did have were hard to strategize alongside other team combination due to its constant appearance in competitive play. Writing for Kotaku on his experience at a tournament, journalist Mike Rougeau compared a capable player using the strategy to "watching a pair of headlights bear down on you in the dark." Another set-up, known as "Moody Smeargle", relied on the in-game ability of the same name and saw a large amount of use from players during the 2016 Pokémon World Championships. Both these set-ups caused frustration and pushback within the Pokémon competitive community with some members calling for the set-ups or even Smeargle itself banned from future tournaments, including professional player PokeaimMD during an interview with Kill Screen. Smeargle would eventually also be banned until it lost the ability to learn Dark Void. In the following generation, Dark Void had the accuracy of the move working drop to a 50% chance.

Smeargle has also seen use in fan challenges, exploits and experiments in Pokémon games, such as Pokémon Brilliant Diamond and Shining Pearl and Battle Revolution. Conducting a Nuzlocke challenge for Pokémon Moon, Neal Chandran from RPGFan described Ilima's Smeargle as a difficult challenge due to it having good stats for early game, describing it as a "real killer" for Nuzlocke runs. In Scarlet and Violet, Smeargle is capable of dealing the most damage in the series' history. It was discovered in October 2024 that through a specific strategy involving the Pokémon Blaziken and multiple different moves such as Last Respects, the player's Smeargle is capable of dealing over 2.6 billion damage to the opponent. A further test and change to the strategy later found that it was possible for Smeargle to deal over 7.83 billion damage. Conversely, another strategy was discovered that used three Smeargle and a Blissey, allowing for the latter to heal the most hit points (HP) in a single turn, totalling at 2,294HP.
