= Silver Pines =

2026 survival horror video game

- Developer: Wych Elm Games
- Publisher: Team17
- Composer: Karl Flodin
- Platforms: Nintendo Switch; Nintendo Switch 2 PlayStation 5 Windows; Xbox Series X/S
- Release: WW: October 8, 2026
- Genres: Survival horror, Metroidvania
- Mode: Single-player

Silver Pines is a survival horror Metroidvania video game developed by Wych Elm Games and published by Team17. The game follows private investigator Red Walker as he searches for missing musician Eddie Velvet in the half-abandoned town of Silver Pines. It was released on October 8, 2026, for PlayStation 5, Xbox Series X/S, Nintendo Switch, Nintendo Switch 2, and Windows.

== Premise ==
Silver Pines is set in a small American town that has been largely abandoned. The story begins with Red Walker arriving in Silver Pines to investigate the disappearance of Eddie Velvet, a musician who has vanished. As the investigation continues, Walker uncovers the town's dark past and experiences a nightmarish descent beyond his control.

The game's tone and setting have been described by multiple outlets as drawing from David Lynch and Twin Peaks, while its survival horror elements have been compared with Resident Evil and Silent Hill.

== Gameplay ==
Silver Pines is a side-scrolling survival horror game with Metroidvania-style exploration. Players control Red Walker while exploring the town, solving puzzles, fighting or avoiding monsters, and managing limited resources. Exploration includes locked doors, hidden paths, and areas that become accessible after the player obtains new tools or weapons.

The game uses survival horror systems, including limited inventory space, healing items, ammunition management, and locked-door puzzles. Combat includes close-range weapons and firearms, with some weapons also used for exploration, such as opening access to blocked or locked areas.

Although presented from a 2D perspective, navigation moves through streets, rooms, and hallways using map-based turns. The game includes environmental signage and a map system that lets players attach photographs as reminders for puzzle locations and items. It also includes real-time interactions, such as manually reloading weapons and entering codes while enemies remain active.

== Development ==
Silver Pines is the debut game from Wych Elm Games, a small studio working remotely from Sweden and Norway. Co-founder Linus Larsson said the team had previously worked in key roles on games including Helldivers 2, The Darkness, and Yoku's Island Express.

Larsson said the original idea for the game began in 2021 during discussions with Mattias Snygg about what project to make next. The team wanted to make a darker and more grounded game after their earlier work, and drew inspiration from 1990s films and television, including 8mm, The X-Files, Twin Peaks, and Jacob's Ladder. The developers also cited early PlayStation survival horror games, especially the first three Resident Evil games and Silent Hill, as gameplay inspirations.

The game's character animation uses rotoscoping, with footage filmed and then drawn over frame by frame. Larsson said the technique was chosen to give the characters a realistic look, particularly in the movement of clothing and hair. The world art uses photo textures that are modified and painted over, with 2D sprites placed in a 3D simulation to create a sense of depth. The team also designed traversal around the idea that players should be able to move toward visible destinations in the environment, in order to make the 2D town feel like a believable space.

== Release ==
Team17 announced Silver Pines on October 23, 2025, for PlayStation 5, Xbox Series X and Series S, Nintendo Switch, and Windows. A gameplay trailer was released in March 2026. In June 2026, Team17 and Wych Elm Games announced that the game would be released on October 8, 2026, for PlayStation 5, Xbox Series X and Series S, Nintendo Switch, Nintendo Switch 2, and Windows. A Windows demo was made available at the same time.

== Reception ==
=== Pre-release ===
In a hands-on preview for Bloody Disgusting, Aaron Boehm praised the demo's navigation, puzzle design, and art direction, writing that the game appeared "ready to deliver a surrealist narrative" while developing its own identity. He was less certain about the early enemy designs, which he considered less distinctive than the rest of the demo.

Fraser Brown of PC Gamer described Silver Pines as visually strong, writing that it was "a looker", and noted its use of limited resources, locked doors, puzzles, healing items, and inventory management. However, he found the opening hour derivative and criticized the early melee combat as slow.

Writing for GameSpot, Mark Delaney included Silver Pines among the games highlighted from the Horror Game Awards' Midsummer Scream showcase. He compared its visual style to Deadlight and its atmosphere to a 2D Alan Wake, writing that it "look[s] this cool".

=== Post-release ===
Reception

Aggregate scores
Aggregator	Score
Metacritic	PC: 85/100; PS5: 86/100
OpenCritic	96% recommend

Silver Pines received "generally favorable" reviews from critics, according to review aggregator Metacritic. OpenCritic determined that 96% of critics recommended the game.

Silver Pines received a nomination for "Best Debut Indie Game" at the Game Awards 2026.
