= Relm Arrowny =

Final Fantasy VI characters

- Final Fantasy character
- Artwork of Relm by Yoshitaka Amano for Final Fantasy VI
- First game: Final Fantasy VI (1994)
- Created by: Akiyoshi Ota
- Designed by: Tetsuya Nomura (preliminary); Yoshitaka Amano; Kazuko Shibuya
- Voiced by: Aoi Yuki

Relm Arrowny (Japanese: リルム・アローニィ, Hepburn: Rirumu Arōnī) is a character in the 1994 video game Final Fantasy VI. She is one of the last characters recruited into the main party, and is often accompanied by her grandfather, Strago Magus. Her mother died when she was young, and her father later left her. Despite her father, Shadow, eventually reuniting with her, she never learns his true identity. She was designed by various people; Yoshitaka Amano, Tetsuya Nomura, and Kazuko Shibuya all do art for her, while Akiyoshi Ota and other writers devised her backstory.

== Concept and creation ==
Nomura's art of Strago, Relm, and Lara. Relm differed slightly from her final design, while Lara was cut from the game entirely

Final Fantasy VI was developed with the mindset that none of the playable cast was the protagonist, and that each of them were equally the "main character". The cast of characters were selected from submissions from across the development team. Once the characters were selected, each individual would write their character's story, with Yoshinori Kitase balancing the plot as things developed. Relm's backstory was created by writer Akiyoshi Ota, with contributions from other writers. Her friendship with the character Edgar was conceived by Soraya Saga.

During development, an early draft of the character's appearance was drawn by Tetsuya Nomura, while Yoshitaka Amano was commissioned to design the characters from the brief outlines provided. Given full creative freedom, Amano wanted to make "real" and "alive" characters, though with consideration for their representation in-game as small computer sprites. However, according to series creator Hironobu Sakaguchi and pixel artist Kazuko Shibuya, most of the characters were designed by Shibuya first as sprites. Though Shibuya acted as an intermediary between Amano and the development team, this resulted in discrepancies between Amano's concepts and the game itself. The composer of Relm's theme, Nobuo Uematsu, identified her as his favorite character in Final Fantasy VI.

Standing 153 centimeters (5 ft) tall, Relm is a young girl, the granddaughter of Strago Magus and daughter of Clyde, who works as an assassin named Shadow. She, like her grandfather, is naturally capable of using magic, Her primary spell is Sketch, which, when used to draw a monster in battle, allows her to use its move against it. In early planning, Strago would have also had a wife that would have been a playable character, forming a trio with Relm. Named Lara, she was defined as a Geomancer-type mage, and would have bickered with Strago about which of two of them would die first, though at the same were intended to be "a good couple that protected each other".

== Appearances ==
Relm first appeared in Final Fantasy VI as one of its 14 playable characters. She is one of the last characters to join the party. She first appears while the party visits her grandfather, Strago Magus, who tells her to go upstairs. The group go with Strago, and later come back to find the house on fire. It was at this point that Strago reveals that he, along with Relm and the rest of the village, have magic powers, attempting and failing to use their magic to put out the fire. The party enters the home to rescue Relm with assistance from the assassin Shadow. She later appears when the party is fighting the octopus Ultros, showing up and defeating him by offering to draw his portrait, using her Sketch ability to defeat him with his own attack. Recognizing her power, the party allows her to join. She later appears after the world is destroyed, being an optional character that Celes Chere can recruit. If recruited, she is able to help Strago get out of a cult, who joined it after believing Relm died during the end of the world. Shadow's parentage to Relm may not come up explicitly during the game, only implicitly, such as through his normally standoffish dog liking her. If Shadow dies during the end of the world, Relm will have a nightmare about her father leaving her at a young age. Relm never learns that he is her father.

In Final Fantasy XIV, Relm makes a cameo through a minion based on her, an item that allows players to have a small animated toy to follow them. Later, a class called Pictomancer was added in the expansion Final Fantasy XIV: Dawntrail. This class is based on Relm and her Sketch ability, with the character in the reveal trailer being designed to resemble Relm.

== Critical reception ==
Relm has received generally positive reception. She became a significant topic of discussion among fans and critics following the reveal of the Pictomancer job in Final Fantasy XIV, which is based on her ability in Final Fantasy VI. Her role as a child character in games has been particularly discussed, with the authors of the book Queerness in Play noting how such characters are usually not as limited to healer roles as "maiden characters" such as Rosa Farrell from Final Fantasy IV and fellow Final Fantasy VI character Terra Branford, and emphasize potential instead of limitation like older teenage characters in Final Fantasy tend to do. Meanwhile, Patrick Holleman in the book Reverse Design: Final Fantasy VI found her juvenile petulance to be "occasionally cute and amusing". However, he felt she alongside Strago suffered from "late-arrival syndrome," and as a result was behind other characters not only mechanically but received less character development. He added that being young made her unlikely to be featured prominently in the story, a connection he admitted he would not have made when playing the game twenty years prior to writing the book.

The relationship between Relm and her paternal figures has also been a subject of discussion. Destructoid writer Chad Concelmo felt that the demonstration of her past with Shadow was beautiful due to its subtlety, and that such stories were a rarity in video games, which he observed were typically more explicit in stating what was happening. In the book The Legend of Final Fantasy VI, Pierre Maugein argued that being abandoned by her father made her create a "hard outer shell" for relationships, considering her a heartbreaking character, especially since her father is in the same group and she never learns his identity. He enjoyed that the characters' shared history was illustrated through clues for the player to pick up, and considered the relationship between the two among the most powerful in the Final Fantasy franchise.

Maugein also observed how she contrasts with what Strago represents, namely the social paradigm of old people being the center of the family in Japanese culture. He felt her acerbity symbolized a shift among younger generations as they grew more estranged from traditional cultural social paradigms, and while she seemed like a "sweet, naive" girl, she was portrayed as strong-willed and able to criticize adults. In this way, she illustrated a "particular truth" to people reflected the concept of a child or "simple" characters being more able to "convey the image of raw life force". Maugein felt that it was this particular aspect of her character that allowed her to save Strago from the Cult of Kefka, her "unconstrained harsh yet affectionate words" cutting through the cult's brainwashing and the moral despair of her grandfather.

Relm's musical theme uses a recurring but changing melody that has been seen as the character reflecting on her own sadness while still conveying a childlike demeanor.

Writer and musician Sebastian Deken in his book examining the characters of Final Fantasy VI discussed how, despite her precocious behavior, the way she is introduced - with a title card he compares to a translation of the poem "Deer Park" by Wang Wei - conveyed depth. He commented that her actions and beliefs told how much she cared about Strago, and how motivated she is to do things for him. When discussing her music theme, he described it as "sweet but immature", talking about how it may cause listeners to wonder where it's going and encouraged them to give her a second look despite her late-game introduction. He felt that the song went in a downward motion to convey sadness, speculating that it may suggest that Relm reflects on her sadness often. The stillness of the theme also caused him to speculate what it could mean, suggesting "time stretching out in front of her, as it does when you’re a child; maybe it’s daylight; or maybe she’s stepping back from her canvas, thumb to her chin." He found her theme "childlike without being childish", and expressed that composer Uematsu's affinity for Relm may be reflected in how the melody illustrates his own artistry.
