= Shadow (Final Fantasy) =

Fictional character in Final Fantasy VI

- Final Fantasy character
- Artwork of Shadow by Yoshitaka Amano for Final Fantasy VI
- First game: Final Fantasy VI (1994)
- Created by: Tetsuya Nomura
- Designed by: Tetsuya Nomura (preliminary); Yoshitaka Amano; Kazuko Shibuya (sprites)
- Voiced by: Yoshito Yasuhara

Shadow (Japanese: シャドウ) is a character introduced in the 1994 role-playing video game Final Fantasy VI by Square Enix. He was conceived by Tetsuya Nomura, based on a character class idea he had wanted to utilize in Final Fantasy V. A ninja mercenary, he travels with a canine companion, Interceptor (インターセプター, Intāseputā), and is available during certain sections of the game as a party member. Elements of his past may also be revealed to the player, in which they discover he was originally a robber named Clyde, who after the death of his partner in crime eventually abandoned his past and took on the name Shadow. He has since appeared in other games related to the Final Fantasy franchise, including Dissidia Final Fantasy Opera Omnia, where he is voiced by Yoshito Yasuhara.

Shadow was well received upon debut, praised for his character depth compared to the other party members but also the illustration of his past within the game itself and how it relates to particular characters. His moment of self sacrifice in the game, and the fact players are able to choose whether or not he permanently dies at that particular moment has been seen as one of the most impactful moments of such within the Final Fantasy series as a whole. His musical theme has also been heavily examined, and how it conveys the image as a character that has cast away much of himself through the use of melodies similar to that of Clint Eastwood's A Fistful of Dollars.

== Appearances ==
Shadow is a ninja and mercenary in the 1994 Square Enix video game Final Fantasy VI. He travels with a dog, Interceptor, and has a gameplay ability called "Throw", in which he can fling weapons from the player's inventory at enemies to damage them. A distant and standoffish person, in the first half of the story he is an optional party member that can be asked to help during certain key moments in the game. He later accompanies the protagonists as they arrive to the in-game village of Thamasa, where they meet the young girl Relm and her grandfather, Strago, the former of which the normally unfriendly Interceptor takes an immediate liking to. Shortly after the party rests at an inn, they wake up and discover a neighboring house is on fire with Relm trapped inside. The party and Interceptor work to rescue her, and at the last moment Shadow saves all of those involved, stating that he wanted to save his dog.

At the end of the game's first half upon its Floating Continent location, the party will encounter Kefka, the game's antagonist, who attacks the party. Shadow will jump in to hold him back, allowing them to escape before the landform plummets. The escape is timed, and if the timer reaches zero will result in a game over for the player and require reloading from a previous save. Once the protagonists reach their means of escape, they are presented with an option to "leave" or "wait". If leave is chosen, they escape but Shadow permanently dies. If they choose to wait, Shadow will arrive just before the timer runs out, and the party as a whole will escape. Regardless of the decision, Kefka devastates the world, and the party becomes separated from each other.

If Shadow survives the Floating Continent, he can be found in the game's Colosseum area, where he can be recruited as a permanent party member, though during the game's conclusion will choose to remain in Kefka's tower and die as it crumbles. In between these moments upon sleeping at inn locations with Shadow in the party, the player has a chance to see dream sequences detailing Shadow's past. Originally a man named Clyde, he was partnered with a man named Baram as a group called Shadow. However Baram is mortally wounded at one point and begs Clyde to kill him, who instead flees. Clyde arrives in Thamasa badly wounded, where a young woman and the village stray discover him. A later sequence shows him walking away from the village, telling his dog to stay with his family. The dog persists, and Clyde, now adopting the name Shadow, takes the dog with him. His death in the tower as a result is intended as penance for Baram's death, saying that he will soon join him. If he instead dies on the Floating Continent, the dream is instead replaced with one from Relm showing the same scene but now from her perspective, seeing Interceptor chasing after Clyde and begging her father to come back.

In other games, he appears as a playable character in Final Fantasy Brave Exvius and Dissidia Final Fantasy Opera Omnia, where in the latter of which he is voiced by Yoshito Yasuhara. Shadow was also one of three characters from the game featured in a tech demo for the August 1995 SIGGRAPH event showing a 3D example of Final Fantasy gameplay. Intended to promote the concept of a 3D Final Fantasy game, a video of the gameplay was included in demo discs of Final Fantasy VII at the 1996 Tokyo Game Show. Outside of video games, cards representing Shadow have been produced for the Final Fantasy Trading Card Game and Magic: The Gathering. A keychain figure based on his chibi artwork was also produced by Bandai, as part of a series to promote the release of Final Fantasy VI.

== Conception and design ==
Nomura's early draft of Shadow differed heavily from the finalized design.

Final Fantasy VI was developed with the mindset that none of the playable cast was the protagonist, and that each of them were equally the "main character". The cast of characters were selected from submissions from across the development team, with artist Tetsuya Nomura contributing the characters Setzer and Shadow, the latter of which was based on an unused concept he had proposed for Final Fantasy V where that game's ninja character class could use a dog to attack. Once the characters were selected, each individual would write their character's story, with Yoshinori Kitase balancing the plot as things developed.

Standing 178 centimetres (5 ft 10 in) tall, an early draft of the character's appearance was drawn by Nomura, while Yoshitaka Amano was commissioned to design the characters from the brief outlines provided. Given full creative freedom, Amano wanted to make "real" and "alive" characters, though with consideration for their representation in-game as small computer sprites. Amano's concepts for Shadow were converted into sprite form by Kazuko Shibuya who had been acting as an intermediary between Amano and the development team, as the character's artwork was completed early in the game's development process. Shadow's finalized design depicted him as a ninja in a black bodysuit that covered most of his face. Select pieces of dark blue and gold armor adorn it, including across his brow where a blue horn protrudes from the left hand side, and a sash surrounds his waist. Meanwhile, Interceptor is depicted as a doberman with black and brown fur. An alternate design depicting Shadow with a blue and yellow color scheme while Interceptor had a red and white striped pattern was also conceived by Amano, but went unused.

Shadow was originally intended to die on the Floating Continent, with Kitase stating he felt it was a fitting death for the character. However, he had also been wanting to incorporate a time limit into at least one section of the game to help create a sense of tension, and chose to improvise the scene where players could instead rescue him before escaping. Meanwhile, the dream sequences were meant to be a callback to the characters Faris Scherwiz and Lenna Tycoon in Final Fantasy V, as a sort of mini "drama series" within the game itself to illustrate his past. The last two of these were specifically meant to clarify Shadow's relationship as Relm's father, with a cut follow up scene where Strago would have confronted him alone to confirm his identity.

== Critical reception ==
Shadow was well received upon debut, particularly due to the conflicting aspects of his nature. John Teti of The A.V. Club described him as a "Han Solo"-type character due to often showing up "at the right moment to play the hero" despite his aggressive personality, and further stated he was one of the "most intriguing and entertaining characters" in the game's large playable cast. Chad Concelmo of Destructoid called him one of "the bravest and most trustworthy characters in the game—even if he has a tendency to disappear at a moment’s notice", further praising Shadow's nuanced and dynamic character. Meanwhile Nathan Schlothan of RPGamer praised the nuance his relationship with Interceptor brought forth in regards to the affection Shadow showed his dog, despite the ninja's insistence of having discarded his emotions.

In a discussion about scenes of the Final Fantasy involving self sacrifice, A.V. Club's Teti felt that Shadow's on the Floating Continent was both the most impactful and the least discussed. He observed the game manipulated players with how they had been conditioned by roleplaying game tropes to that point, with the timed event serving as an urge to escape as quickly as possible, while the "wait" option once players reach the point of salvation being seen as filler. However the wait option was instead meant as a hint, and upon discovering this Teti realized that the moment was not a predestined death for the character, but instead that he had "chosen to abandon a friend." While the series has been known for similar scenes involving a playable character's death, Teti felt that many fell flat due to how they took away the player's agency and a "cheap, ham-fisted move". However Shadow's death was entirely the player's choice, and he saw it as the game calling out his own cowardice, something he appreciated. Destructoid's Concelmo echoed these sentiments, considering the moment a brilliant strategy on the parts of the developers and enjoying the "agonizing" feel of waiting to see if Shadow will return for players unaware of how the scene will play out.

In another article for Destructoid, Concelmo further observed how well the game alludes to the relationship between Shadow and Relm, and how well it is implied but never stated. He enjoyed that it required players to think and draw their own conclusions, something he felt was absent from other games that addressed similar topics. He saw several hints as being provided to the player actively by the developers, such as Shadow's standoffish nature implying he is hiding something, emphasized by how much his nature contrasts with the rest of the game's more "robust" cast. While neither Shadow nor Relm were two of the game's major characters in Concelmo's eyes, he felt that aspect also helped heighten the situation and make it more impactful. He also appreciated that the intended scene with Strago was cut from the final game, as it allowed players to more actively be involved in the reveal and felt the end result was "much more rewarding." Patrick Holleman in the book Reverse Design: Final Fantasy VI also shared these sentiments, praising the developers' decision not to oversell Shadow's paternal connection to Relm as he felt that the game would have suffered had the character provided a "tear-filled admission".

=== Analysis of themes and music ===
Shadow's music utilizes melody similar to that of American Westerns to illustrate Shadow's character, but also shares many similarities to Relm's

In the book The Legend of Final Fantasy VI, Pierre Maugein felt that Shadow exemplified the "Ronin" character archetype that was commonly found in Hollywood films and later "re-assimilated" as a concept into Japanese culture, while also acting as a deus ex machina for many of the game's critical moments. Stating that Shadow at the beginning of the game was more of a concept than fleshed out, he felt "nonetheless a remarkable character" due to how his own desire for personal freedom set him apart from the rest of the cast. He felt the player was actively rewarded with their investment in utilizing Shadow as a party member through the dream sequences that illustrated his origins. His past and his relation to Relm further fit his character archetype, though he wished the scene with Strago confronting Shadow had remained as he felt it would have been "a touching step" and demonstrated awareness "of the suffering he has caused". Maugein also acknowledged the absence of the scene was "truer to the character that is almost 'immaterial'" as Shadow was often portrayed as not particularly impactful on any one character but moreso the world's fate. He added that while Shadow has all the makings of a hero, being a savior would have been incompatible with his desire for freedom. This, coupled with the assisted suicide nature of his sacrifice either on the Floating Continent or in Kefka's tower, made him "a magnificent hero, worthy of the greatest tragedies" in Maugein's perspective.

Sebastian Deken in his book examining Final Fantasy VI and its themes described him as the most "laconic" of the game's protagonists, due to his tendency to float in and out of the player's party at his own discretion. At the same time, Deken regarded him as one of the game's most complex, "a man on the run from himself" and the guilt of his past mistakes. Deken further drew similarities to Clint Eastwood's character of The Man With No Name in A Fistful of Dollars, noting that Shadow had many similarities to stock characters in old Westerns with a "withdrawn, prickly personality" that echoed Eastwood's stone-faced portrayal. He added that Shadow's character ability in the game, Throw, fit him thematically as well: representative of a man that had thrown away his partner, child and even his own name, and in "one way or another, he throws himself away." Deken observed however while such allowed him to remain distant, Shadow still performed acts of generosity and self-sacrifice, and tells Kefka that he understands the importance of family and friends during the game's final battle. As his story's revealed, and he finally sacrifices his life at the end of the game, Deken felt this let Shadow shed the Eastwood-esque image. The transition from the strong and silent warrior archetype to a character so "gut wrenching and complicated" stuck with Deken, and helped portray Shadow more as a character who wears "twenty different shades of black."

When examining Shadow's music themes, Deken felt Final Fantasy VI composer Nobuo Uematsu drew inspiration from Ennio Morricone, the composer behind A Fistful of Dollars and other films in that genre to help maintain the Western feel of the character and an instantly recognizable reference to the protagonists of such and painting Shadow as an "enigmatic, distant, and mercenary" person capable of acts of heroism to both American and Japanese audiences. Deken additionally stated the flow of the music also illustrated his relationship and counterpoint to Relm and her own melody: while hers invoked themes of "forests, water and light", Shadow's invoked imagery of a "shade" that "comes and goes like the wind." He further noted that the two themes were a musical key apart, Relm's in F-sharp while Shadow's was in E-minor, further portraying them as "related, but not relating" to each other. During the game's final scenes, when Shadow chooses to die, the melody is reprised but played instead by only string instruments, and the now "lonely stoicism of the Morriconesque theme is split at the sternum, exposing a raw, beating heart", representing to Deken Shadow facing his demons instead of riding off into the sunset.
