= Phantom Blade Zero =

2026 video game

- Developer: S-Game
- Publisher: S-Game
- Director: Soulframe Liang (Note: Qiwei Liang is known by the pseudonym Soulframe. In English-language public communications, he uses either Soulframe Liang or Soulframe.)
- Producer: Soulframe Liang
- Artist: Michael Chang
- Composer: Caisheng Bo
- Series: Phantom Blade (Note: The series was initially known as Rainblood and was later renamed to Phantom Blade. It began with Rainblood: Town of Death, Rainblood 2: City of Flame, and Rainblood Chronicles: Mirage. It was expanded with Phantom Blade 1, Phantom Blade 2, and Phantom Blade 3, which were released for mobile devices. It was joined by Phantom Blade: Executioners and Phantom Blade Zero.)
- Engine: Unreal Engine 5
- Platforms: PlayStation 5; Windows
- Release: 29 October 2026
- Genre: Action role-playing
- Mode: Single-player

Phantom Blade Zero (Note: Stylized as Phantom Blade Ø. Chinese: 影之刃零; pinyin: Yǐngzhīrèn Líng.) is a wuxia action role-playing game developed and published by the Chinese studio S-Game. The player assumes the role of Soul, an elite assassin of the Order. He is framed for the murder of the Shadow Sovereign of the Order and hunted by members of the Order. Inflicted with a fatal wound to his heart and revived with a tainted heart, he is left with only sixty-six days to live. Set in the Phantom World, the story is centered on his mission to restore his heart and unravel the conspiracy that has condemned him. The game is an entry in the Phantom Blade series.

The game's action was designed based on Chinese martial arts. It involved motion capture performances by martial artists such as Donnie Yen, collaborations with traditional martial arts schools, and inspirations drawn from classic martial arts cinema. The game's style was rooted in kungfupunk, a distinctive take on wuxia fused with elements from other genres. The game's music was created by using traditional Chinese instruments and blending their sound with modern styles.

Phantom Blade Zero was released for PlayStation 5 and Windows on 29 October 2026. It sold over 4 million units in three days.

== Gameplay ==
Phantom Blade Zero is a wuxia action role-playing game. It is played in single-player mode from a third-person perspective.

Phantom Blade Zero features combat in which offense and defense can happen simultaneously, rather than alternate back and forth in turns. This approach reflects Chinese martial arts.

The player controls Soul, an elite assassin of the Order. Soul can equip two main weapons and two phantom edges. The main weapons are blades. They are used to perform light attacks, heavy attacks, and power surges. Power surges function as ultimate combat abilities. Performing them consumes the resource sha-chi essence, which accumulates through landing heavy attacks and parrying. Phantom edges, which function as combat abilities, are diverse armaments in the form of axes, spears, maces, hammers, bows, firelocks, flamethrowers, cannons, and more. Using them consumes the resource remnant sparks, which is stored in a limited quantity and is replenishable. In addition, Soul can equip two medicines and six accessories. Medicines are consumables, which store a limited number of uses and are replenishable, for restoring health and applying additional effects. Accessories are items that passively grant effects.

Other combat maneuvers include standard combos (light attack combos), sha-chi combos (heavy attack combos), dodges, blocks, and parries. Guarding (holding block), blocking, and performing heavy attacks consume the resource sha-chi. Weapon switching, which has a cooldown, fully restores sha-chi. A ghoststep, a repositioning move, is triggered by parrying an enemy's blue-flash attack or dodging an enemy's red-flash attack.

The skill tree features upgrades along three main rows with several interconnected nodes in between. Furthermore, main weapons, phantom edges, medicines, and accessories are upgradable.

The game takes place in a semi-open world. Its regions are seamlessly interconnected. However, some places may be inaccessible at first, but they can be reached through non-linear means and have multiple possible paths. Notably, some phantom edges also function as exploration tools that provide access to areas. One example is the Dread Axe, which is used to break iron chains blocking paths. Bells, which serve as checkpoints, are scattered throughout the environment. The main quests follow Soul's story, which constitutes the main story. The side quests explore the stories of other characters. The main story culminates in one of four possible endings.

The game has multiple difficulty options, namely Wayfarer (easy), Pathbreaker (medium), Hellwalker (hard), and 66 Days (hard, permadeath). In Hellwalker, the enemy artificial intelligence is more advanced and adaptive. In 66 Days, the experience is the same as Hellwalker but adds a counter starting at 66 that decreases by one with each death and imposes permadeath if it reaches zero. Additionally, the game has a New Game Plus mode.

== Synopsis ==
=== Setting ===
According to Michael Chang, masks symbolize the disguise, confinement, and repression of the jianghu, enveloping the inner madness, obsessions, and struggles of characters. They represent those who have fallen, contrasting the heroes who remain true to their hearts and uphold xia. The character design incorporated nuo masks.

Phantom Blade Zero is a game based on wuxia. Soulframe Liang commented that "Broadly speaking, it falls under the category of ARPGs. But more specifically – maybe it could create a new identity that is Wuxia Action Games?" It particularly introduces kungfupunk, as termed by Liang. (Note: Soulframe Liang uses the term kungfupunk in English, but he interchangeably uses the terms wuxiapunk (武侠朋克) and kungfupunk (功夫朋克) in Chinese.) This style was conceived with the aim to move beyond the established framework of traditional wuxia and transmit wuxia in a new distinctive way to audiences. It combines traditional kungfu with steampunk and cyberpunk. When asked about the difficulties of introducing culturally unfamiliar themes to Western audiences, Liang acknowledged that while these themes may initially pose challenges, games that deliver high quality and enjoyable experiences can transform these themes into strengths that attract players.

Phantom Blade Zero takes place in the Phantom World. This world is based on China during roughly the Ming dynasty, with elements of wuxia, steampunk, cyberpunk, dark fantasy, horror, and more. It incorporates the concept of the jianghu, which is a domain populated by common folk beyond the sphere of the imperial court and official government. It also incorporates the concept of the wulin, which is a martial underworld comprising warriors, guardians, and others bound by codes. In this world, there are people who need protecting across the jianghu and a conspiracy that has enveloped the wulin.

The protagonist Soul represents a type of heroic figure known as a xiake. Liang described him as "[...] this kind of character is a very typical Eastern hero. He's not so talkative, doesn't use a lot of words, but he's badass, swift, and fast. Cold on the outside, but warm and hot inside, in the heart. He always wants to help the weak, although he himself only has limited days to live. We call this 'Xiake (侠客)', which means the Chinese version, the Kung Fu version, of heroes."

=== Plot ===
Soul is an elite assassin of the Order, an elusive and powerful organization in the wulin. However, he is framed for the murder of Mu Tianmiao, the Shadow Sovereign of the Order, and hunted by members of the Order. In a duel, Soul and Zuo Shang, once blood brothers, drive their blades through each other's hearts.

The Flesh Sculptor, a mystic healer, offers Soul the choice between the Hollow Heart or the Tainted Heart to survive. The Hollow Heart, a mechanical contraption, will restore his life but leave him devoid of all emotions and desires. The Tainted Heart, sustained by venom, will keep him alive but only for sixty-six days. Choosing the latter, Soul is revived with a Tainted Heart. The Flesh Sculptor then tells Soul of another heart hidden in the remote town of Pangzhen, which has the power to raise the dead and may serve a permanent replacement. However, Zuo Shang is also seeking the heart to heal the mortal wound he suffered at Soul's hands.

Heading for Pangzhen, Soul fights off various monsters as well as members of the Order sent after him. He eventually meets Lady Inanis, a high ranking leader of the Order who has decided to help him instead. Upon reaching Pangzhen, Soul finds the town and the surrounding villages have been afflicted by a mysterious illness that either kills its victims or transforms them into mindless wooden puppets, while others have lost their sanity to a process called Transcencion in an attempt to gain power. Eventually, Soul discovers the Blight plaguing the land originates from the experiments of Leng Tu, the self proclaimed Herald of the Veil. He worships a local deity called Meng Hua, the Lady of the Veil, who resides in the Discordance realm and wields the destructive power of Blight. To bring the Meng Hua in to the physical plane, Leng Tu plans to transfer her soul into a puppet powered by the Radiant Heart, the heart both Soul and Zuo Shang are searching for.

During his journey, Soul begins to recover memories of his past thanks to a blessing from Inanis. He eventually remembers that Zuo Shang is the one who tricked him into killing Mu Tianmiao in a duel, all so he could seize control of the Order for himself.

Soul then goes to confront Lu Teng and the Meng Hua, with four possible endings depending on the player's choices:

- Annihilation: If the player does not complete certain optional missions, then Soul lacks the power to defeat Meng Hua, who wields the power of the Blight to destroy the world.
- Long's Roar: If the player completes all of the missions required for the Final Battle ending except for mastering Bloodline Awakening, Soul successfully defeats Meng Hua, who is then killed by Zuo Shang. Zuo Shang explains he plans to find a way to control the Blight in order to protect the world from it. Soul battles him, but lacks the strength to defeat him. Zuo Shang ultimately decides to spare Soul, telling him to make the most of the little time he has left.
- Final Battle: If the player completes all of the necessary missions, Soul confronts Zuo Shang just like in the Long's Roar ending. However, Soul ultimately prevails thanks to his Bloodline Awakening and defeats Zuo Shang. Zuo Shang leaps off a cliff to his death to avoid being killed by Soul's hand, and Soul recovers the Radiant Heart.
- Undying Grudge: This ending is exclusive to the "66 Days" difficulty mode. If Soul runs out of lives and dies permanently, Zou Shang visits his grave and promises to reform the wulin.

== Development ==
Phantom Blade Zero is a game developed and published by S-Game. The studio is based in Beijing, with a motion capture and animator team in Shanghai, an art team in Hong Kong, and a global publishing team in Los Angeles.

Phantom Blade Zero is an entry in the Phantom Blade series. According to Soulframe Liang, the game represents a return to the story foundations of the first two Rainblood games, the series' origins, and introduces a substantial amount of new content. He presented it as "the spiritual rebirth of the original Rainblood". He elaborated that it follows a new story that departs significantly from what was established in earlier titles (including character relations, character motivations, and other elements), requires no knowledge of prior works, and contains the full content within itself. It was built using Unreal Engine 5.

S-Game started the full-scale development of Phantom Blade Zero in 2022 and had plans for the game since 2017. Throughout 2017, a few early concepts and other preliminary work were shared. This included, for example, concept art of four characters designed by Michael Chang, which was shown during ChinaJoy 2017. Around Chinese New Year in 2017, the decision was made to shift from the 2D graphics reminiscent of the previous games to 3D graphics. This led to the choice to use Unreal Engine 4. In 2018, the project was put on hold due to what was considered an unfavorable environment for developing this kind of game. In 2021, interest in the project was revived following an improvement in the conditions. In that same year, Tencent proposed and formalized a partnership deal, which offered financial backing and additional support, as the company had learned about and were interested in the studio's goals to develop large-scale PC and console games. At the time, the studio had plans for two projects using Unreal Engine 5 in this category, namely Phantom Blade Zero and Stellar Saga, the latter set in space and centered on humanity's struggle for survival amid the high-dimensional wars of advanced civilizations. Liang oversaw the development of Phantom Blade Zero and delegated decisions regarding Stellar Saga to trusted colleagues. Ultimately, the studio shifted its focus entirely to Phantom Blade Zero and suspended all other new projects.

S-Game originally envisioned Phantom Blade Zero as a smaller game, but the attention garnered at the PlayStation Showcase in May 2023 prompted the studio to increase the scale and fully commit to the project. In an interview shortly after the showcase, Liang said that he felt nervous leading up to the event, but that the international reception boosted their confidence and that years earlier, Feng Ji, the producer of Black Myth: Wukong, encouraged him to create a single-player game that could captivate players worldwide. Another turning point came with the 2024 release of the highly successful Black Myth: Wukong, which increased interest in Phantom Blade Zero and led to additional funding for the game from investors. Liang commented that "It's not necessarily changed our [expectations], but maybe it's changed others' expectations and anticipation of us. We did receive more resources, but we also received more pressure from the success of Black Myth: Wukong."

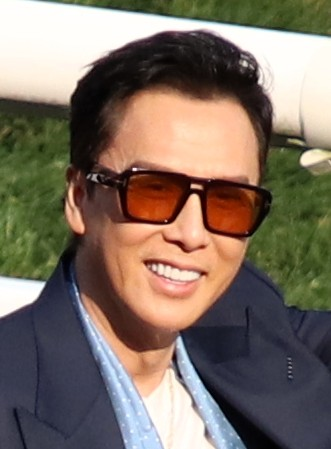
Donnie Yen served as a creative consultant and portrayed the character Mó Yuan.

The action design was based on Chinese martial arts, which included working with martial arts instructors and drawing inspiration from classic Hong Kong martial arts films. A nationwide search was conducted to trace the roots of Chinese martial arts and meet their inheritors. This included masters of the Shaolin Temple, Emei Mountain, and Guangdong's Southern Lion Troupes, among others. The developers wanted to create authentic martial arts action, so they emphasized the importance of immersing themselves by going to the communities, mountains, and temples to engage in discussions and train together in order to understand the essence of the martial arts. Motion capture of performances by martial artists was used for the movements of characters. The performances were done at the same intensity of the intended action, so post-production speed adjustments that may make the action appear artificial could be avoided. The performers were supported by a wire rig, operated via a pulley system by other crew members, during the execution of movements. Yang Liu served as the action director. He led the martial arts motion capture team. Masters and inheritors of traditional martial arts schools were consulted in order to capture the most authentic kungfu techniques. Donnie Yen served as a creative consultant, contributing his martial arts and action filmmaking expertise. His own team, comprising several people including Kenji Tanigaki as an action director, also helped with the process.

The action was designed to reflect the philosophies of Chinese martial arts. For example, Liang said that whereas defense might simply be expressed as blocking motions in other contexts, Chinese martial arts emphasize attacking while defending in response to an opponent's movements. He regarded action based on Chinese swordsmanship more as a clash of blades in which the distinction between offense and defense is very small. Furthermore, the prototypes for the weapons were drawn from traditional Chinese weaponry. A design principle was that the essence of each weapon is expressed through the action in terms of mechanics and visual appearance. Every weapon was designed with its own unique mechanics to ensure that all weapons remain novel to use rather than limited by common weapon types. The developers believed that relying on shared basic mechanics would diminish the distinctiveness of each weapon. Sometimes, in order to better understand how a weapon's weight and length impact movement, real replicas were forged by master swordsmiths. Lastly, the action was designed to ensure the fluidity of movement through a rich animation set for elements such as transitions (for a natural flow between actions), contextual execution moves, dynamic environmental interactions, and multi-target combat mechanics. Liang described the action as "In Phantom Blade Zero, combat happens at an extremely fast pace. Movement is rapid, attack frequency is high, and you can perform maneuvers like running along walls, teleporting behind enemies, and executing sudden cinematic finishers that dynamically shift the camera to wide or close-up angles, making it feel like you’re in a Kung Fu movie."

Liang mentioned that "If you watch a lot of Hong Kong Golden Age kung fu movies, you will feel all the swordplay in Chinese kung fu. They are all attacking while defending, so it happens at the same time. You will [see] this very dynamic, fluid combat scene in the movie. Previously there were not so many games coming out of China bringing the authenticity of Chinese kung fu and Chinese gameplay into the gaming industry. So [with] the assistance of Donnie Yen and his team, we have [built] everything from the ground up. We had to rethink all these combo systems–defending and attacking–to see how we can implement the movement of Chinese kung fu into a playable game."

A collective enemy artificial intelligence, which follows a formation logic, was designed to enable multiple enemies to operate as an interconnected unit. Both collective and individual enemy artificial intelligences were integrated into a unified system that governs when enemies strike alone, fight in formations, and interact with one another. What often appears to be several enemies attacking at once may actually be a single move modeled across multiple enemies, which results in a visually striking spectacle and keeps encounters relatively manageable. The approach was aimed to avoid a pitfall where enemies either overwhelm in swarms or stand idle during multi-enemy battles. However, the system was not applied to lesser enemies that may be encountered together in the environment. The design was inspired by the deliberate combat dynamics employed in martial arts films, where characters not directly engaged in battle contribute to an atmosphere of both disorder and order.

In addition to the martial arts, the game incorporates many other Chinese traditions, such as southern China's ancestral hall worship rituals, Guangdong's lion dances, Zhejiang's puppetry, Fujian's deity processions, Jiangxi's nuo masks, Sichuan's bianlian (face changing), Beijing opera, China's imperial ceremonies, and more. Liang commented that he hopes to help carry on folk culture and intangible cultural heritage. Real-world objects, ranging from structures such as temples and village homes to weapons and other items, were scanned for use as assets. Historic towns and villages in Guangdong, Fujian, Zhejiang, Hebei, and other provinces served as models for architectural designs. Cultural relics were reproduced in collaboration with museums located in Beijing and other places. Young artists from the Central Academy of Fine Arts drew the guiding maps using Chinese brushes on Xuan paper. It was done in the art style of Chinese ink wash.

The principal characters were portrayed by actors. The cast underwent 3D scanning to serve as the basis for the character models and delivered the facial capture performances for the characters. It included the model and stage actor Jia Xiongkai (also known as Yucheng) as the protagonist Soul, the actress Zhang Jinzhi as the character Mu Xiaokui, the film academy student Zhang Xince as the character Zuo Shang, and the actor Donnie Yen as the character Mó Yuan. (Note: For the role of Mó Yuan, Donnie Yen did the English voice performances, the facial capture performances, and the motion capture performances.)

The voice acting was done with dedicated actors and directors in Chinese and English. It was completed with lip syncing for both languages. The English voice cast included Roger Craig Smith as Soul and Donnie Yen as Mó Yuan.

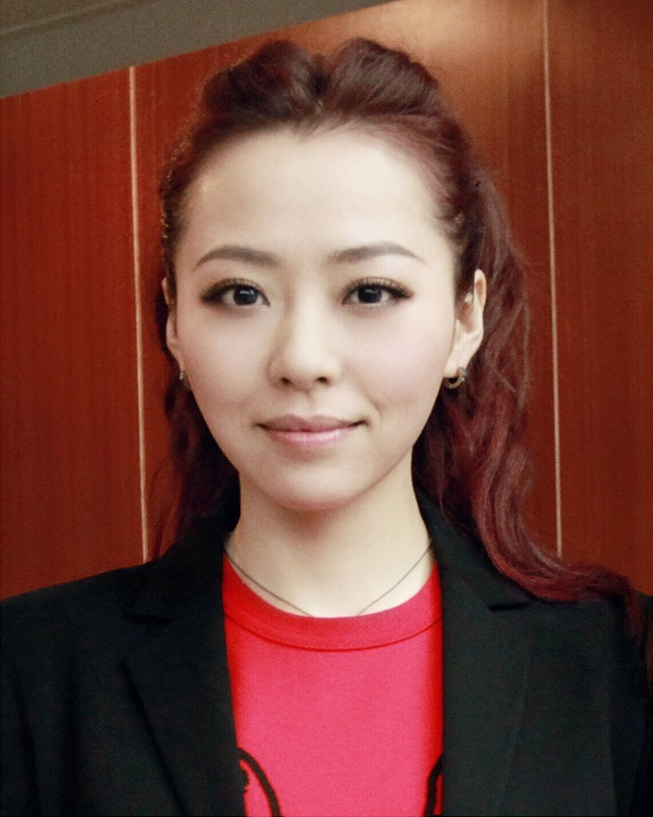
Jane Zhang provided the vocals for the theme song "Heart Lake".

In terms of the music, Caisheng Bo utilized traditional Chinese instruments and blended their sound with modern styles. He sought to capture the essence of traditional Chinese instruments. For example, he remarked that even though the erhu is commonly associated with sorrow, it also has a free-spirited and martial quality that aligns with the jianghu. Accordingly, the instrument had been used to articulate a sense of freedom and killing intent that breaks away from the sorrowfulness. Modern styles were incorporated to give new textures to the traditional Chinese instrumentals. This included, for example, electronic, rock, hardcore house, metal, and trap. Moreover, Bo worked closely with the sound effects team to ensure that both music and sound were coordinated throughout all scenes. The music was structured to establish a psychological rhythm that reflects a scene's atmosphere. For instance, throughout the location Pangzhen, it makes use of a septuple meter that alternates between 4+3 and 3+4 as well as strings that blur accents to evoke a feeling that something is not right and a sense of groundlessness. In string arrangements, the second fiddle part was frequently omitted to create a heavy, dark, and grainy sound. Furthermore, regarding the combat, the music was focused primarily on heartfelt melody rather than rhythm in order to elicit a state of flow and convey underlying emotions regardless of a battle's intensity. The intention was to subtly express the tragic undertones and life stories of characters, emphasizing the emotional depth of battles, during the exhilaration of combat. In addition, the characters Soul, Mu Xiaokui, and Zuo Shang each have their own thematic melody, all of which stem from the same A minor melody and therefore blend seamlessly.

The vision behind the music was to combine the traditional and modern sides of China. Bo commented that "In vague terms, I would describe the ethnic Chinese music most listeners are familiar with as beautiful ancient villages or sacred temples—something that looks as if it has come straight out of an ink-wash painting, surrounded by tall mountains, beautiful waterfalls, and tall, sharp parasol trees. Because of Phantom Blade's unique concept of Kungfu Punk, I was able to make bold musical decisions to match the visuals. For Phantom Blade Zero, then, I want to introduce the modern side of Chinese music—think of Shanghai, a city of skyscrapers and flashy neon that is undeniably Chinese."

== Release ==
Phantom Blade Zero was released for PC (Windows) and PlayStation 5 on 29 October 2026. PlayStation 5 physical editions of the game, which include discs, are set to launch in 2027.

During an anniversary concert for the Rainblood series on 22 November 2016, S-Game announced that the series would be remade with an extended plot in a new game with the Chinese codename Yingzhiren Zero (影之刃Zero). It was changed to the Chinese title Yingzhiren Ling (影之刃零) by the time that the game was unveiled.

S-Game unveiled Phantom Blade Zero with a trailer during the PlayStation Showcase on 24 May 2023. The studio participated in the showcase after receiving an invitation following a meeting with Sony representatives, including Christian Svensson, Shuhei Yoshida, and others. In January 2025, the studio released a trailer celebrating the Year of the Snake, which revealed that a release date would be announced in 2025. During The Game Awards in December 2025, the studio released a trailer announcing the release date as 9 September 2026. The date was chosen in consideration of the market conditions and the symbolism associated with 9/9, which represented a reversal of fate and an overturning of heaven's order, in allusion to the in-game concept of 66 days. However, in June 2026, the studio stated that the release was moved to 29 October 2026. The decision was made to provide additional time to further improve the quality of the product.

== Reception ==
=== Reviews ===
Reception

Aggregate scores
Aggregator	Score
Metacritic	PC: 88/100; PS5: 86/100
OpenCritic	94% recommend

Phantom Blade Zero received "generally favorable" reviews from critics, according to review aggregator Metacritic.

=== Sales ===
On the release day, Phantom Blade Zero reached over 720 thousand concurrent players on Steam. During the first weekend after release, it reached over 830 thousand concurrent players on Steam.

S-Game announced that Phantom Blade Zero sold over 4 million units in 72 hours.

=== Accolades ===
Ceremony	Category	Result	Ref.
UCG Game Awards 2024	Phenomenon of the Year	Won	
Ultra Game Awards 2025	Most Anticipated Game	Won	
The 44th Annual Golden Joystick Awards	Ultimate Game of the Year	Nominated	
The Game Awards 2026	Game of the Year	Pending	
The Game Awards 2026	Best Game Direction	Pending	
The Game Awards 2026	Best Art Direction	Pending	
The Game Awards 2026	Best Score and Music	Pending	
The Game Awards 2026	Best Action Game	Pending	

== See also ==
- Red thread of fate
