= The Blood of Dawnwalker =

2026 video game

- Developer: Rebel Wolves
- Publisher: Bandai Namco Entertainment
- Director: Konrad Tomaszkiewicz
- Designer: Daniel Sadowski
- Artist: Bartłomiej Gaweł
- Writers: Jakub Szamałek; Ariana Siarkiewicz
- Composers: Nikola Kołodziejczyk; Piotr Musiał; Mikolai Stroinski; Karolina Matuszkiewicz; Adam Jędrysik
- Engine: Unreal Engine 5
- Platforms: PlayStation 5; Windows; Xbox Series X/S
- Release: 3 September 2026
- Genre: Action role-playing
- Mode: Single-player

The Blood of Dawnwalker is an action role-playing game developed by Polish studio Rebel Wolves and published by Japanese studio Bandai Namco Entertainment for Windows, PlayStation 5 and Xbox Series X/S. Set in the mid 14th-century in Vale Sangora, a fictional valley in the Carpathian Mountains ruled by vampires, the game follows Coen, a peasant who becomes a "Dawnwalker", human by day and vampire by night, and has 30 in-game days to rescue his family from the vampire lord Brencis. The game has no linear main quest: time advances only when the player undertakes quests or other plot-affecting actions.

Rebel Wolves was founded in 2022 by Konrad Tomaszkiewicz, director of the The Witcher 3: Wild Hunt, and other former CD Projekt developers, and The Blood of Dawnwalker is the studio's first game. Built in Unreal Engine 5, it was announced in January 2025 and is intended as the first entry in a series of self-contained stories following Coen across different eras.

The Blood of Dawnwalker was released on September 3, 2026, and sold over one million copies within three days. It received generally favorable reviews from critics, with critics praising its writing and Coen's dual forms, and frequently comparing it with The Witcher 3. Its 30-day time system drew the most discussion: most reviewers praised it, but reception ranged from finding its time pressure less consequential than expected to overbearing. Within a week of release, Rebel Wolves began hiring for sequel development.

== Gameplay ==
The Blood of Dawnwalker is a dark fantasy action role-playing game played from a third-person perspective. Players control Coen, a Dawnwalker who possess both human and vampiric traits. Inspired by tabletop role playing games, the game features an open-ended narrative structure where the overarching storyline adapts to player choices, quest resolutions, and time management rather than following a linear path.

The campaign takes place over a 30-day limit to achieve the primary objective, although time does not advance through free-roam exploration or real time passage. Instead, undertaking major narrative quests and key character actions consumes segments of the day.

The core gameplay loop centers on contrasting day and night states, each altering Coen's abilities, social interactions, and approaches to objectives. During the day, Coen assumes human form, which enables broader peaceful interactions with non-player characters and non-violent quest solutions, and combat focusing more on directional swordplay. At night, Coen takes on a vampiric form with enhanced agility and traversal to reach areas typically inaccessible during the day, with combat shifting to claw strikes and bite attacks. Operating at nights requires the management of Coen's bloodlust through feeding on humans or animals; failure to do so may result in important characters such as quest givers or traders to become victims of his Bloodthirst.

Character progression is managed through three skill trees, where players can spend earned skill points to unlock active abilities and passive enhancements. Wayside shrines throughout the world acts as both fast-travel waypoints and resting points to upgrade skills.

== Synopsis ==
The game is set in a gothic, fictional mid 14th-century kingdom called "Vale Sangora", located in the Carpathian Mountains. Brencis—an ancient, sinister vampire—seizes control of the kingdom alongside his vampiric followers amidst an outbreak of the plague. He absolves the human citizens of all existing taxes and obligations, promising them a taste of the undead's blood that cures the plague. In return, however, he levies a "blood tax," demanding "a few drops of blood" from every adult during the monthly gathering. Yet, during this ritual, the weak and infirm are typically put to death. This oppressive regime has led to widespread discontent among the inhabitants, who are forced into servitude under the vampire lords.

Among the inhabitants is a young man named Coen. An attempt by Brencis and his followers to turn Coen into one of their own—thereby making him a willing henchman—fails. Instead, he becomes a "Dawnwalker": human by day, vampire by night. However, Brencis and his subordinate vampires do not realize this; instead, they believe Coen died during the transformation process. Brencis abducts Coen's family and takes them to his castle. There, they are to serve as sacrifices at the ceremony marking Brencis's upcoming investiture as Prince, scheduled a month out from their capture.

Coen recovers with help from Anca, a local herbalist who teaches him blood magic to help him fight during the day while his vampire powers are suppressed. Coen starts his crusade against Brencis and his court to free his family and the valley. Along the way, he can form allies with others who oppose Brencis, such as the vampire Lacra, who is working on behalf of an unknown force to destroy Brencis, and Crake, the leader of the human resistance who wishes to return the heir of the murdered king back to power. Coen can also discover the history of Vale Sangora during his travels, and learns about the Augors, a secret society that employs dawnwalkers to maintain balance between humans and monsters.

If Coen eliminates Brencis’s vampiric boyars, he will send a message to Coen asking to parley. Brencis explains Coen’s transformation into a vampire was meant to free him from serving his family his whole life and start a new one under Brencis’s tutelage. However, Coen’s lifetime of work in the village silver mine tainted his blood and led to his transformation as a dawnwalker who is free of Brencis’s influence. He offers Coen a peace agreement. In exchange for his family and surviving neighbors, Coen can sell out the human resistance to be slaughtered.

If Coen sells out the resistance, Brencis will kill them all but uphold his end of the bargain. Coen’s family will be returned and his village will be excluded from the blood tax. Brencis’s rule over Vale Sangora continues until he disappears and all mention of his rule is scrubbed from history by an unknown force. If Coen attacks Brencis’s castle with Lacra, she disrupts the ritual Brencis had been working towards and unleashes chaos and dark magic on the castle. Coen and Lacra confront him and eventually defeat him, but Lacra disappears before she can give Coen an explanation as to what Brencis was planning. Coen saves his family and Vale Sangora is saved, but in chaos without a leader. If Coen sides with human resistance, he aids them in breaking the blockade to the outside world, letting human reinforcements arrive to assault Brencis’s castle. There, they fight to Brencis’s throne room and defeat him. Coen saves his family and Catalin, the cruel son of the previous Knyaz, returns to power in Vale Sangora, though Coen can convince Crake that Catalin is no better than Brencis. Regardless of whether Coen was successful in saving his family, Brencis turns his young sister Lunka into a Murohn, a feral vampire, forcing Coen to falsify her death and keep her hidden in a secret cave where he brings her food.

If Brencis is defeated, the Augors approach Coen. They explain that Brencis’s actions upset the order they are in charge of keeping and had sent their agents to stop him, but Coen had already defeated him before they could arrive. They offer Coen a place in their organization to make use of his nature as a dawnwalker in exchange for helping Lunka. In a post-credits cutscene set in modern-day, a delivery man delivers an older Coen a package containing a blood bag, which he uses to heal from his wounds before resuming a fight with an unknown entity that appears at his window.

The player can discover secret endings for Coen throughout the game. If Coen helps the head of Brencis’s church Father Florin, he rewards Coen with a secret entrance to the castle where Coen can duel Brencis alone. If the player defeats Brencis during the prologue, he will react with astonishment and frustration that a newborn vampire has ruined centuries of work and planning, and the game will end. Coen can also leave Vale Sangora at any point in the story. Doing so will leave his family and the rest of the kingdom to suffer under Brencis’s rule.

== Development ==
Konrad Tomaszkiewicz, a director of The Witcher 3: Wild Hunt (2015) and head of production for Cyberpunk 2077 (2020), left his position at CD Projekt in May 2021 following an internal investigation into workplace bullying allegations that found him not guilty. Afterward, he took an extended break to consider his next steps. Having spent 17 years at the company, Tomaszkiewicz wanted to shift to smaller projects with a smaller team, hoping to avoid the challenges he faced while working on large-scale games at CD Projekt with over 500 employees.

In February 2022, it was announced that Tomaszkiewicz had founded a new studio, Rebel Wolves, which was working on its first game. The development team includes Tomaszkiewicz's brother and creative director, Mateusz, as well as design director Daniel Sadowski, narrative director Jakub Szamalek, and art director Bartłomiej Gaweł, all of whom previously worked on The Witcher series and Cyberpunk 2077. By May 2024, Rebel Wolves had expanded from around 20 to 90 team members. As of April 2026, Rebel Wolves had 160 employees (including administration).

The game was developed on a budget of $40 million dollars, which was supplied by NetEase following its acquisition of 26% of the studio in 2022.

The studio envisions the game as the first installment in an eponymous series, describing it as a dark fantasy "narrative sandbox" featuring non-linear quests set in medieval Europe. The game was developed using Unreal Engine 5.

At the beginning of June, at the Summer Game Fest, a trailer was released featuring the protagonist of The Blood of Dawnwalker in a modern-day setting. Rebel Wolves commented that they are planning further games set in the same universe but in eras other than the Middle Ages. However, each game is intended to feature a self-contained story, free of cliffhangers, unresolved plot threads, and without time travel. The Blood of Dawnwalker is according to the developer nonetheless intended to be the beginning of a saga. Rebel Wolves released a trailer showing Coen in a modern-day setting and said that future entries would follow him across centuries and beyond Vale Sangora.

In mid-July, Rebel Wolves announced that the development had finished and that the game had reached gold status.

Tomaszkiewicz noted that initial player feedback affected how the game was designed: initially, the time mechanic was more restrictive than it ended up being in the game.

== Release and versions ==
The first trailer for The Blood of Dawnwalker was released on 14 January 2025. The game was released for PlayStation 5, Windows (via Steam, Xbox on PC and GOG.com), and Xbox Series X/S on 3 September 2026. Various retail versions of the game are available; in addition to the standard edition (which only contains the game), there is a so-called "Eclipse Edition" (which also contains the game's soundtrack and a digital comic book) and a limited collector's edition (which contains all of the additional content of the Eclipse Edition in physical form as well as a world map of the game and a decorative figure). In addition, there are two PC versions/builds for different age groups—due to varying age ratings in different regions.

After an announcement that the maximum frame rate for the console versions would be 40 FPS drew negative feedback, Rebel Wolves commented that they would enable 60 FPS on consoles (Xbox Series S excluded) via a day one patch.

== Reception ==
Reception

Aggregate scores
Aggregator	Score
Metacritic	(PC) 84/100 (PS5) 83/100 (XSXS) 84/100
OpenCritic	94% recommend

Review scores
Publication	Score
Destructoid	9.5/10
Eurogamer	4/5
Game Informer	7/10
GameSpot	8/10
GamesRadar+	3/5
IGN	9/10
PC Gamer (US)	83/100
PCGamesN	9/10
Push Square	7/10
RPGFan	92/100
Shacknews	9/10
Video Games Chronicle	4/5

The Blood of Dawnwalker received "generally favorable" reviews, according to review aggregator website Metacritic. OpenCritic determined that 94% of critics recommended the game. Several reviewers framed the game against The Witcher 3: Wild Hunt because of its shared director and style. Eurogamer's Robert Purchese wrote that the game "meets [the Witcher's] high bar, if not quite raising it" and called it "a hell of a debut." Kaitlyn Peterson of TheGamer argued that although the games featured similar settings and protagonists, the two games otherwise "don't have all that much in common" in a positive review where she said The Blood of Dawnwalker reminded her of why she loved RPGs. Shaun Prescott of PC Gamer called it one of the best blockbuster action role-playing games "for years, probably since Elden Ring."

Dawnwalker's writing and story was widely praised. RPG Site's James Galizio said that "the game's writing is possibly the absolute best I've see in an RPG" and commended the game's multi-faceted character design. GameSpot's Phil Hornshaw argued that the writing and voice acting was so strong that it made "much of what might otherwise be mundane open-world content unexpectedly compelling." Purchese said that the quests were "uniformly" excellent, and RPGFan's Zek Lu hailed the story, calling it "absolutely phenomenal, with some of the best writing I have ever seen in Western RPGs."

The game's time system, where nearly every quest and skill purchase consumes part of a 30-day limit, drew the most discussion from critics, with mostly positive notes. Travis Northup of IGN called it "brutal, nerve-wracking, and completely awesome", arguing that treating time as a currency "makes just about every aspect of Dawnwalker better." Hornshaw considered the ticking clock "among the game's best ideas", noting that it gave everything the player did a feeling of importance. Lu noted that the constraint made the game highly replayable but felt that the open-world itself was "stale and bland"; he also said that this might been by design though, as the game's systems encourages you to focus on more interesting quests because of the constraint. Other critics found the pressure less binding than what they expected: Prescott described it as "largely illusory" and Purchese characterized the clock as more of an "existential threat than a pressing one". Game Informer's Diego Nicolás Argüello gave a more critical review on the time mechanic, feeling that he played too restrictively because of how it was presented but that there was potential for the feature in future games.

The main character's dual nature as a human by day and a vampire by night was lauded for adding variety to the game. Northup called the day/night cycle the game's best feature, arguing that having the opportunity to have two completely different builds made combat more fun to play, while Hornshaw and Galizio were more critical of how the split carried in to combat, with both writing that human and vampire fighting ended up feeling similar in practice. Reception to the combat overall generally positive: Northup and Peterson both reported an initially frustrating learning curve that gave way to enjoyment, while Lu argued that human and vampire fighting ended up feeling similar in practice.

The game's technical performance was described as generally acceptable by critics on launch, with minor issues reported on PlayStation 5 and PC by some reviewers. IGN's Jacqueline Thomas noted that compared to other recent Unreal Engine 5 games that had large technical issues on their PC launches, Dawnwalker had no large issues and a stable frame rate.

=== Sales ===
The game sold more than 1 million copies within its first three days of release. Less than a week after launch, Rebel Wolves narrative director Jakub Szamalek announced that the studio was hiring a lead writer for a sequel in the "Dawnwalker saga."

=== Awards ===
Year	Award	Category	Result	Ref.
2026	Golden Joystick Awards	Ultimate Game of the Year	Nominated	
2026	Golden Joystick Awards	Best Lead Performer (Will de Renzy-Martin)	Nominated	
2026	Golden Joystick Awards	Best Storytelling	Nominated	
2026	Golden Joystick Awards	PC Game of the Year	Nominated	
2026	The Game Awards 2026	Best Narrative	Pending	
2026	The Game Awards 2026	Best Role Playing Game	Pending	
