= Orbitals (video game) =

2026 video game

- Cover art, depicting Maki (left) and Omura (right)
- Developer: Shapefarm
- Publisher: Kepler Interactive
- Directors: Marcos Ramos; Jakob Lundgren
- Producer: Arron Wray
- Designer: Hugo Sanchez Westberg
- Artist: Johannes Varmedal
- Composer: Falk & Klou
- Engine: Unreal Engine 5
- Platform: Nintendo Switch 2
- Release: September 3, 2026
- Genre: Puzzle-adventure
- Mode: Multiplayer

Orbitals (Note: Japanese: オービタルズ, Hepburn: Ōbitaruzu) is a 2026 cooperative puzzle-adventure video game developed by Shapefarm and published by Kepler Interactive. It released worldwide on September 3, 2026, for the Nintendo Switch 2. The game follows Maki and Omura as they traverse across space to prevent their station from being destroyed by a deadly cosmic storm.

The game is centered around split screen multiplayer through local or online play. Each player assumes the role of either Maki or Omura and use a combination of tools to complete cooperative puzzles. In between puzzle segments, the two players manually fly the duo's ship as each of them handle the ship's weapons and controls. The ship's interior can be explored, where numerous non-player characters and minigames can be interacted with.

Orbitals was conceived by Marcos Ramos and Jakob Lundgren as a short, accessible experience with a focus on puzzle-solving. Lundgren previously worked at Hazelight Studios as a level designer for their own co-op games. Wanting to set Orbitals apart from Hazelight's games, the team envisioned it in the style of 1980s anime that they were nostalgic for, collaborating with anime production company Studio Massket to animate the game's cutscenes.

Orbitals received favorable reviews from critics for its gameplay and setting, while its vintage anime-inspired art direction was especially acclaimed.

== Gameplay ==
The gameplay of Orbitals is designed around split screen multiplayer (pictured is Maki's view on the left and Omura's view on the right), where each player uses tools to complete puzzles cooperatively.

Orbitals is a puzzle-adventure game played largely from a third-person perspective, while some platforming sections are viewed from a two-dimensional (2D) perspective. It is an exclusively two-player cooperative game; there is no single-player option. Local and online play are supported, the latter of which can be facilitated by the Switch 2's GameShare and GameChat features.

Gameplay is asymmetrical, indicating that the two players must play different responsibilities and synergize with each other to complete puzzles. Each player assumes the role of either Maki or Omura; each player's perspectives are always visible through a split screen format. Throughout all of the game's puzzles, the two players must each use one of three tools that require aiming and shooting. These are the Liquid Launcher, a hosepipe-like weapon that uses water to extinguish fires and push obstacles; the Beam Cannon, which functions similarly but uses lasers to melt objects; and the Scrap Hook, a grappling hook that can latch onto certain doors and panels to open them.

In between the puzzle-platforming sections, the two players manually fly Maki and Omura's ship. This is achieved by having one player independently operate the ship's weapons and the other serve as its pilot; these roles can be swapped at any time. Players can also explore the interior of the ship itself, which houses numerous non-player characters and minigames that are gradually unlocked as the story progresses.

== Plot ==
A space station colony is caught in the middle of an interstellar storm. A colonist named Togen brings a young Maki and Omura and puts each of them into their own I.M., against the wishes of fellow colonist Kinako. The I.M.s put Maki and Omura's souls into stasis, such that when they die, their bodies can be reprinted, albeit still affected by aging. The storm suddenly flares and destroys much of the space station.

Fifteen years later, the colony remains operational, but most of its inhabitants are elderly. Togen informs Maki and Omura that a Rift within the still-active storm has opened up earlier than expected. Fearing that the storm could become more unstable, Togen dispatches the duo to traverse beyond the Storm Wall through the Rift to collect three Reactor Cassettes so they can activate the space station's shields. Togen and Kinako periodically communicate to the duo via radio.

Maki and Omura pilot their own ship to breach the Rift and investigate a derelict space station, whose inhabitants have all perished. Entering a massive asteroid, they activate a vault that leads to a cluster of space garbage. Maki and Omura find a Cassette amid the garbage but witness it being stolen by an airborn Drone Carrier. They return to Togen, who persuades them to pursue the drone.

Maki and Omura uncover the Frozen Depths, a past civilization now overgrown with ice. Togen informs them that he has located the remaining two Cassettes. As they progress through the icy caves, they discover a gargantuan, spherical machine in space. Upon getting closer, the machine produces a glaring light before a metallic door shuts, blocking it from view. The team backtracks and confronts the Drone Carrier, which they destroy in combat, recovering the Cassette. They return to the colony, where Omura asks Togen about the numerous locations they have visited. An unwilling Togen confirms that they had once belonged to the colony but were all destroyed during the storm. Omura further questions Togen about the gargantuan machine they saw; Togen becomes evasive, and says to Omura that the Storm Wall is close to collapsing, begging him and Maki to find the remaining two Cassettes.

A new Rift opens, leading the duo to the Ship Graveyard. Togen suddenly disappears from the transmission. Maki and Omura find another space station, where they meet the loud-mouthed Jaga, who has the second Cassette lodged into his head. Jaga says to the group that he will give them the Cassette under the condition they find him a new engine so he and his son can escape the Graveyard. The two are successful and make the trade, returning the Cassette to the colony. At the colony, Kinako, concerned about the longevity of the I.M.s, informs Maki of a secretive construction project named the One Mind Machine (O.M.M.), a device that ostensibly runs without power and will allow the colonists to safely upload their souls for eternity. Before she can divulge more, Omura calls Maki over to continue pursuing the last Cassette.

Maki and Omura find the Cassette amid lush gardens that have enough space and energy for the colony to thrive. The duo excitedly report to Togen, who has returned to the colony. Togen reveals the true purpose of the Cassettes: perpetually activating the O.M.M., the gargantuan machine Maki and Omura saw earlier. Despite Togen's promises that the colonists, particularly the older ones, will be safe within the machine without bodily worries, Maki and Omura are vehemently opposed to the idea, claiming that doing so would not be truly living. The two use their ship to travel to the O.M.M. and destroy its power connector. They are successful, but the O.M.M. starts up regardless. They attempt to travel to the gardens, but Togen physically intervenes with his own ship. Maki and Omura jointly use their ship's laser to critically damage Togen's. Togen and Maki argue, both claiming that the other is selfishly forcing their beliefs onto the colonists.

Maki hurriedly returns to the colony and attempts to convince the elderly, including Kinako, to leave with them. Kinako insists to Maki that she is content with her life and wishes to be uploaded to the O.M.M.; an emotional Maki relents. Another senior, Mrs. Ponpon, conversely states that she still has adventuring to do. Omura gives the colonists the choice to leave with him and Maki or be uploaded to the O.M.M. The group that stays with Maki and Omura leave as the storm fully destroys the space station but leaves the O.M.M. intact. During the end credits sequence, said group builds a life in the gardens and memoralizes the colonists in the O.M.M., including Kinako and Togen.

== Development and release ==
Orbitals was developed by Shapefarm, a studio based in Tokyo, Japan. Marcos Ramos and Jakob Lundgren served as the game's creative director and game director respectively, the latter of whom previously worked at Hazelight Studios as a designer for A Way Out (2018), It Takes Two (2021), and Split Fiction (2025). Shapefarm had previously operated in a subcontractor capacity, helping other studios with art production, but its members always had ambitions to make an original title. They settled on creating a "playable retro anime", particularly in the style of anime from the 1980s. Much of the Shapefarm team, particularly Ramos, was nostalgic for that era of Japanese animation and wanted to faithfully replicate the techniques of the time. One of the ways Shapefarm achieved this was by intentionally limiting the fluidity of character animations to just thirty frames per second (FPS) and sometimes as low as twelve.

While its gameplay was largely similar to Hazelight's games, the studio wanted the game to stand out through its art style. Shapefarm teamed up with Studio Massket, the anime studio behind projects such as Lycoris Recoil, for the game's cutscenes. The game's visuals were inspired by Cowboy Bebop, Dragon Ball, and Neon Genesis Evangelion. The two lead characters were inspired by Sailor Moon and Ranma Saotome, while the story drew influence from films created by Studio Ghibli. Shapefarm sought the assistance of long-standing animation director Hidetoshi Yoshida, who became the game's key animator and created the game's storyboards. The gameplay's focus on cooperation is symbolized throughout the game's world and characters; an overarching theme of togetherness was meant to imitate "the feeling of sharing this anime experience with a friend, or a family member".

Orbitals was designed to be an accessible experience, with Lundgren adding that the game was "never too difficult". As with Hazelight's previous games, the team used asymmetrical gameplay to facilitate cooperation and interaction among the two players. The game was designed to be a short experience and has a larger emphasis on puzzle-solving than platforming. In creating the co-op puzzles, Lundgren wanted to avoid what he referred to as "start-stop co-op", where one player assists their partner without being active themselves; he instead tried to make situations where both players are constantly moving and needing to communicate.

=== Release ===
Orbitals was announced at The Game Awards in December 2025. Shapefarm is one of the founding members of Kepler Interactive, who published the game. It was released for the Nintendo Switch 2 on September 3, 2026. Orbitals utilizes the Switch 2's GameShare functionality, which allows the player who purchased the game to invite a friend to play for free.

== Reception ==
Reception

Aggregate scores
Aggregator	Score
Metacritic	82/100
OpenCritic	88% recommend (Note: Based on 78 reviews)

Review scores
Publication	Score
Eurogamer	3/5
Game Informer	7/10
IGN	8/10
Nintendo Life	9/10
Shacknews	8/10

Orbitals received "generally favorable" reviews from critics, according to review aggregator Metacritic. OpenCritic determined that 88% of critics recommended the game. During its launch week, Orbitals sold 3,949 physical copies in Japan. It debuted at No. 3 in the UK and fell to No. 18 in its second week.

=== Awards ===
Year	Award	Category	Result	Ref.
2026	Golden Joystick Awards	Best Visual Design	Nominated	
2026	Golden Joystick Awards	Developer's Choice	Nominated	
2026	The Game Awards 2026	Best Debut Indie Game	Pending	
2026	The Game Awards 2026	Best Multiplayer Game	Pending	
