= Pokémon Pokopia =

2026 video game

- Universal artwork
- Developers: Game Freak; Omega Force
- Publishers: JP: The Pokémon Company; WW: Nintendo
- Directors: Shigeru Ohmori; Takuto Edagawa; Tatsuto Tsuchishita; Teruyuki Shimoyamada
- Producers: Hisashi Koinuma; Takanori Sowa; Akira Kinashi; Shinya Saito; Toyokazu Nonaka; Tomohiko Sho; Kanako Murata
- Designer: Megumi Sawada
- Programmers: Yu Ito; Kengo Ida
- Artist: Marina Ayano
- Writer: Masao Taya
- Composers: Hiromu Akaba; Jieun Kim
- Series: Pokémon
- Engine: Katana Engine
- Platform: Nintendo Switch 2
- Release: March 5, 2026
- Genres: Social simulation, sandbox
- Modes: Single-player, multiplayer

Pokémon Pokopia (Note: Japanese: ぽこ あ ポケモン, Hepburn: Poko A Pokemon; officially transliterated Poco A Pokemon) is a social simulation game co-developed by Game Freak and Koei Tecmo's Omega Force and published by Nintendo and The Pokémon Company for the Nintendo Switch 2. It is a spin-off of the main Pokémon series. Pokémon Pokopia stars a Ditto that uses its ability to transform to imitate a human, using this ability to help cultivate the post-apocalyptic world around it and assist other Pokémon it finds along the way.

The game was conceived by Pokémon Scarlet and Violet director Shigeru Ohmori, who thought about how much fans would enjoy being able to cultivate their own Pokémon habitats. Developer Game Freak partnered with Omega Force due to the latter's experience in the sandbox game genre, particularly Dragon Quest Builders 2. It released worldwide on March 5, 2026.

Upon release, Pokopia received highly positive reviews from critics, being one of the best-reviewed games of 2026 at the time of release and the highest-rated Pokémon game on the review aggregate Metacritic. Critics highlight its gameplay and aesthetics as the game's main highlight, with many noting Pokopia as a spiritual combination of Minecraft, Viva Piñata, and Animal Crossing.

A paid three-part expansion pass is scheduled to be released for the game. The first part, Bubbly Basin, released in August 2026. The other two parts will be released in late 2026 and 2027 respectively.

== Gameplay ==
Players control a Ditto who is imitating a human. The player can customize the Ditto's appearance, including skin color and hair color, as well as clothing. The game features crafting and building mechanics that players use to befriend new Pokémon, who can then teach the Ditto new moves to use to interact with the environment. These abilities allow Ditto to perform various tasks; these include creating bushes, watering dry plants, cutting debris, and smashing rocks. As players progress and build the area around them, they attract more Pokémon. These Pokémon can assist Ditto in cultivating the world around them and converse with other Pokémon. Each Pokémon can be found in different habitats that Ditto needs to create in order for them to appear, such as planting grass under a tree or putting a punching bag next to a bench. They also have their own needs, such as the Pokémon Hoothoot, who enjoys darkness. The game has a day and night cycle linked to real world time and features different biomes.A later update also allows players to dive in water to reach otherwise unexplorable reigons of the map, including new aquatic-themed Pokémon and furniture.

The game features 300 Pokémon, selected from Generations I through IX.

== Plot ==
The game takes place in a post-apocalyptic version of the Kanto region. A Ditto finds itself in a world abandoned by humans and uninhabitable to Pokémon. After finding its trainer's old Pokédex and assuming a form based on them, it meets a Tangrowth, going by "Professor Tangrowth", who has tasked himself with studying the environment and solving the mystery as to why humans and Pokémon have left. After finding a Squirtle and helping it recover from dehydration, Ditto is tasked with restoring various habitats so the Pokémon population can recover. Along the way, Ditto and Professor Tangrowth find a mysterious tower that initiates a "Team Initiation Challenge", where Ditto must provide certain items for the supposed wellbeing of Pokémon.

As Ditto restores various habitats, they also encounter more special Pokémon, including: Peakychu, a Pikachu who has lost the ability to generate electricity; Smearguru, a Smeargle who is exceptionally talented at painting; Mosslax, a Snorlax who slept so long moss and other plants grew over it; Chef Dente, a Greedent who once belonged to a chef trainer; DJ Rotom, a Rotom who has possessed a stereo system; and Tinkmaster, a Tinkaton who has adapted to use various tools to help reconstruct the landscape. Ditto also finds various logs left behind by humanity that allude to what happened in the past. Due to various inexplicable phenomena, the landscape gradually became inhospitable to life, forcing humanity to decamp to outer space. Unable to bring their Pokémon with them, they instead opted to store them in a massive computer system that would be sustained even after the humans departed, with the ability to release certain Pokémon should the system start to fail.

After successfully restoring habitats and completing the Team Initiation Challenge, Professor Tangrowth and Ditto celebrate with party poppers. This inadvertently sets off an emergency evacuation protocol, revealing the structure to be a rocket ship that launches into outer space. As the ship travels through space, it eventually is discovered by a human (implied to be Ditto's original trainer) who recovers the items inside, including the photo Ditto sent off.

== Development ==
Pokémon Pokopia was initially conceived by Pokémon Scarlet and Violet director Shigeru Ohmori during that game's development as a spinoff. When thinking about potential new approaches for the franchise, Ohmori began to dwell on his earliest work in the series as a map designer on Pokémon Ruby and Sapphire, and thought it would be appealing for fans to be able to create their own Pokémon habitats. As Game Freak lacked experience in the sandbox game genre, Koei Tecmo's Omega Force was chosen to co-develop the title alongside them on recommendation from The Pokémon Company, as Omega Force had previously worked on similar titles such as Dragon Quest Builders 2. Ohmori served as the concept and senior director of the game, while Omega Force director Takuto Edagawa served as chief director. Koei Tecmo's Marina Ayano served as the game's art director. Pokémon Pokopia was produced by Kanako Murata.

The game was announced during a Nintendo Direct in September 2025. It was released on March 5, 2026.

== Reception ==
Reception

Aggregate scores
Aggregator	Score
Metacritic	89/100 (Note: Based on 110 reviews)
OpenCritic	98% recommend (Note: Based on 100 reviews); 89% recommend(Part 1: Bubbly Basin) (Note: Based on 28 reviews)

Review scores
Publication	Score
Eurogamer	4/5
Famitsu	10/10, 10/10, 10/10, 9/10
Game Informer	9/10
GameSpot	9/10
GamesRadar+	4.5/5
IGN	9/10
Nintendo Life	8/10
TechRadar	5/5

According to the review aggregator website Metacritic, Pokémon Pokopia received "generally favorable" reviews. It is the highest-rated Pokémon game on the site. Fellow review aggregator OpenCritic found that 98% of critics recommended it. In Japan, four critics from Famitsu gave the game a total score of 39 out of 40, with three reviewers giving the game a perfect score of 10.

Eurogamer writer Lottie Lynn found Pokémon Pokopia similarly strange to other Pokémon spinoffs due in part to its humanoid Ditto, while considering the combination of elements from Animal Crossing and Minecraft sensible. She was particularly happy with the implementation of the game's real-time 24-hour clock, stating that, because it was put in the menu rather than on-screen during normal gameplay, it helped her focus on what she should be doing rather than when she should be doing it, as well as introduce strategic elements to cultivation. She also stated that the game starts out somewhat slow, but becomes more exciting as the game becomes more complex.

GameSpot writer Steve Watts evaluated Pokémon Pokopia as having addressed the shortcomings of Animal Crossing and Dragon Quest Builders by fusing their features with those of Pokémon. Unlike previous battle-oriented series, he highly valued the way the player character built, explored, interacted with, and bonded with Pokémon, and gave it a score of 9 out of 10, saying that it was one of the best Pokémon spinoffs of all time celebrating the series' 30th anniversary.

=== Sales ===
Pokémon Pokopia sold 2.2 million units worldwide in its first 4 days of release, with 1 million units sold in Japan alone. As of March 2026, it had sold 4 million units worldwide. It sold over 5 million units worldwide by August 2026, making it one of the best-selling titles for the Switch 2.

=== Awards ===
Year	Award	Category	Result	Ref.
2026	Golden Joystick Awards 2026	Console Game of the Year	Nominated	
2026	Golden Joystick Awards 2026	Ultimate Game of the Year	Nominated	
2026	The Game Awards 2026	Best Family Game	Pending	
2026	The Game Awards 2026	Best Sim/Strategy Game	Pending	
