= Ditto (Pokémon) =

Pokémon species

- Pokémon character
- Ditto artwork by Ken Sugimori
- First game: Pokémon Red and Blue (1996)
- Designed by: Ken Sugimori (finalized)
- Voiced by: English: Rachael Lillis (4Kids) Michele Knotz; Japanese: Kotono Mitsuishi
- Portrayed by: Suki Waterhouse (as "Ms. Norman")

In-universe information
- Species: Pokémon
- Type: Normal

Ditto (/ˈdɪtoʊ/), known in Japan as Metamon (Japanese: メタモン), is a Pokémon species in Nintendo and Game Freak's Pokémon media franchise. First introduced in the video games Pokémon Red and Blue, it was created by the design team as a tribute to the pop culture yellow smiley face ideogram, and its design finalized by Ken Sugimori. Since its initial appearance it has appeared in multiple games including Pokémon Pokopia and the Pokémon Trading Card Game, as well as various merchandise related to the franchise. In addition, it appears in manga and anime adaptations of the Pokémon franchise, with its appearances in the latter being voiced by Kotono Mitsuishi in Japanese, and both Rachael Lillis and Michele Knotz in English. A Ditto also appears in the 2019 film Detective Pikachu masquerading as a human woman named "Ms. Norman" and portrayed by Suki Waterhouse. It also plays the role of the main character in Pokémon Pokopia.

An amorphous species classified as a Normal-type Pokémon, Ditto appears as a short pink or purple blob with beady eyes and a small mouth. Through the use of its "Transform" attack, it can mimic any object or creature temporarily, and if it transforms into another Pokémon will gain any attacks known by it. However, this mimicry is often imperfect, resulting in Ditto's eyes or entire face remaining the same on the transformed body. Though Ditto can not evolve into a stronger form in the franchise like other Pokémon, at one point in the development of sequel titles Pokémon Gold and Silver an evolution called Animon (アニモン) was considered through the use of the "Metal Coat" item on a Ditto.

While initially seen as particularly weak in the original Red and Blue, the addition of the "Daycare" mechanic in later Pokémon titles and Ditto's ability to breed with almost every Pokémon significantly boosted its popularity, making them vital for the game's competitive scene. While the simplicity of its design has been criticized, others wished to see its abilities used to greater potential within the franchise. Ditto's unique nature also led to a rumor in the fandom that it was a failed clone of another Pokémon, Mew. While disproven by Game Freak's developers, it has been noted as an example of players wanting more depth from the franchise, and impacted the development of Detective Pikachu.

== Conception and design ==
Ditto's amorphous body reacting to attack, as illustrated by Ken Sugimori. Sugimori would later describe it as one of the designs he was most attached to.

Ditto is a species of fictional creatures called Pokémon created for the Pokémon media franchise. Developed by Game Freak and published by Nintendo, the Japanese franchise began in 1996 with the video games Pokémon Red and Green for the Game Boy, which were later released in North America as Pokémon Red and Blue in 1998. In these games and their sequels, the player assumes the role of a Trainer whose goal is to capture and use the creatures' special abilities to combat other Pokémon. Each Pokémon has one or two elemental types, which define its advantages and disadvantages when battling other Pokémon. A major goal in each game is to complete the Pokédex, a comprehensive Pokémon encyclopedia, by capturing, evolving, and trading with other Trainers to obtain individuals from all Pokémon species.

Introduced in Red and Blue, the design started as pixel art sprites by the development team first, with a single color identity chosen to work within the Super Game Boy hardware limitations. While conceived as a group effort by multiple developers at Game Freak, the finalized design and artwork was done by Ken Sugimori. Originally tasked with drawing the characters to illustrate a planned strategy guide by Game Freak when the games released, Sugimori drew all the sprites for the game in his style to not only unify their designs visually but also modify any design elements he felt were amiss, while trying to retain the original sprite artist's unique style.

Ditto stands 1 foot (30 cm) tall and is classified as a "Normal" type species. It has the form of an amorphous blob with a simplistic face consisting of a pink mouth and two small black beady eyes. Ditto's body is normally shown to be purple or sometimes a bright pink, with a rare blue "shiny" variant also possible, and is able to rearrange its cellular structure into anything at will temporarily using its "Transform" attack, and if transformed into another Pokémon will gain access to all attacks the copied Pokémon knows. However, if it tries to do this from memory it will often get details wrong. Created as a tribute to the pop culture yellow smiley face ideogram, the character was originally called Metamon in Japan. When localizing the games for western audiences, Nintendo decided to give the various Pokémon species "clever and descriptive names" related to their appearance or features as a means to make the characters more relatable to American children. As a result, it was given the name "Ditto" due to its mimicking nature.

While in a 2011 interview with Andy Eddy for @Gamer magazine, Game Freak's staff described Ditto as "the weirdest Pokémon" in the franchise, the character has also seen significant popularity among the developers. Franchise creator Satoshi Tajiri revealed in a 1997 interview with Famimaga 64 that he played a customized version of Blue featuring stickered art of Ditto attempting to transform into fellow Pokémon Bulbasaur, Squirtle and Charmander simultaneously, illustrated by Sugimori. Sugimori himself in a latter interview for Nintendo Dream magazine that Ditto was a design he was particularly attached to, enjoying the fact that the character was made from a limited number of lines, adding "It doesn't have much of a shape, but that flabby appearance gives it character. I feel like that makes its design more interesting." Sugimori elaborated further in a later 2009 interview, calling Ditto an amazing character and noting while it was simple, he marveled at how he could create a new character by simply distorting the line around a smiley face, and felt it demonstrated the power of lines in art.

In 2018, early development builds of Pokémon Gold and Silver, the sequels to Red and Blue, were leaked onto the internet. Among several Pokémon that did not appear in the final was an evolution for Ditto called Animon, which could be acquired by giving a Ditto the "Metal Coat" item. Appearing as a blob with a large mouth with two upper and lower fangs and a spike-like horn protruding from its head, Animon would have retained Ditto's Normal-type.

== Appearances ==
=== In the video games ===
First appearing in Pokémon Red and Blue, Ditto has appeared in every main Pokémon title since. In these games, it can only learn one attack, "Transform". If successfully used in an in-game battle, the Ditto will temporarily copy the typing, appearance, and attacks of the target Pokémon until the battle concludes. In Gold and Silver, Ditto is established as genderless, but players are able to utilize the game's daycare mechanic with another Pokémon to have it breed with them, resulting in an offspring based on the other parent Pokémon. Ditto, however, is unable to breed with itself, and must be caught in the wild or traded for with other players in order to acquire one. In Pokémon Black and White, a "Dream World" variant was added, with an ability that allowed it to automatically transform into the enemy Pokémon upon entering battle without having to waste a turn. In Pokémon Scarlet and Violet, most wild Ditto are disguised as other Pokémon and will only reveal their actual form if battled or targeted with the game's scanner feature.

Outside of the mainline Pokémon titles, Ditto has also appeared in other related games including Pokémon Snap and the Pokémon Mystery Dungeon series, as well as the Pokémon Trading Card Game. While not initially included in Pokémon Go, it was added in a later update, where it will initially disguise itself as different Pokémon from a particular assortment that changes from time to time, with the "shiny" variant being particularly rare due to this feature. Ditto has also been the focus of April Fool's Day events within the title. The 2026 spin-off title Pokémon Pokopia features a Ditto as its protagonist, with the Ditto taking on human form and using its shapeshifting powers to build and expand an island area. Outside of the Pokémon franchise, Ditto was initially planned to appear briefly in Super Smash Bros. Melee via the game's Poké Ball item. It was later added in Super Smash Bros. Ultimate instead, where it will transform into one of the combatants and temporarily fight until it leaves.

=== In other media ===
Ditto transforming into the Pokémon Loudred in Detective Pikachu. Since the character's introduction in the anime, the retention of its black eyes has been used as a tell in media and merchandise for a disguised Ditto.

Several Ditto have appeared in related Pokémon manga and anime over the course of the franchise. Most notably, the anime episode "Ditto's Mysterious Mansion" introduced a Ditto owned by a girl called Duplica that was unable to transform properly, retaining its eyes and mouth on any forms it took. By the end of the episode, it overcomes this hurdle with the help of series antagonists Team Rocket. Treated as a stand alone issue for this one Ditto, other appearances of the species in the anime were shown able to mimic targets perfectly. However, this would establish a visual tell referenced in other media, games and merchandise, where its untransformed face would be used to indicate a disguised Ditto. In Japan, Ditto is voiced by Kotono Mitsuishi, while in English it was voiced first by Rachael Lillis and later Michele Knotz.

In Detective Pikachu, a genetically modified Ditto pretends to be the bodyguard of antagonist Howard Clifford. Named Ms. Norman, the character is played by Suki Waterhouse, and appears as a woman with long pink and blonde hair in a business suit, wearing sunglasses and pink gloves. During the film's climax, Norman confronts the film's protagonist, removing their sunglasses to reveal their black eyes. They then rapidly switch between multiple Pokémon forms afterward to attack the protagonist before being defeated.

Writer Ben Samit stated in an interview they wanted Ditto in the film due to feeling characters that could shapeshift were a good fit for detective stories as a whole. Director Rob Letterman further elaborated, stating he felt Ditto was perfect for a misdirect, something they really wanted to have in the film. The character being disguised as a human was directly inspired by a moment they recalled in the anime where Ditto appeared in a human form except for its eyes, though they double checked to ensure that was something Ditto could viably do in the franchise's canon. While the concept evolved during the course of development, they kept Ditto as a constant, and conceived it switching through various Pokémon as a fun idea for the film's end fight sequence.

== Promotion and reception ==
Since its introduction, Ditto has been featured on multiple bits of merchandise, ranging from capsule toys to bean bag chairs. In 2016, The Pokémon Company started selling stuffed toys based on Ditto transformed as other Pokémon but retaining Ditto's eyes and mouth. In 2022, The Pokémon Company released peel-able cards for the trading card game that showcased Ditto transformed as another Pokémon, with a sticker that could be peeled off to reveal the actual Ditto card underneath. While the sticker itself was noted as banned in official trading card game tournaments, it caused concern for collectors on the best way to preserve the cards, specifically if the glue would damage the underlying card over time.

As the franchise has progressed Ditto has received mostly positive reception. IGN in their "PokemonoftheDayChick" series of articles wrote that while Ditto was "utterly useless" in Red and Blue, it "slammed to the forefront of popularity" in Gold and Silver due to its ability to breed with any Pokémon. This particular trait became widely known in the series' fandom, GamesRadar+'s Carolyn Gudmundson citing players calling it jokingly a "sex slave" due to this role in the games and Gudmundson herself stating it gets "used and abused more than any other Pokémon". It's also led it to being noted as particular vital for the franchise's competitive scene, with Paste naming it one of the series' best Pokémon, and IGN's Dale Bashir naming it one of the Pokémon that most impacted the franchise's history, describing it as "the personification of possibilities". Nadine Manske in an article for Dot eSports expressed similar sentiments, naming it the best of the series' Normal-type Pokémon and further stating "how can you not love this expressionless purple blob just on its own? [...] there's something about that face that gets me every time."

However, James Stephanie Sterling in an article for Destructoid criticized Ditto's design as "totally forgettable, not worth mentioning". They further described it as a "pink splodge" that had "no thought" put into its appearance, feeling its ability to transform was a poor excuse for a design that looked like "they just squiggled on a piece of paper and then fucked off to the pub." On the other hand, The Gamer's editor-in-chief Stacey Henley expressed dismay that the series had not "done enough with its potential". Comparing its appeal to that of Marvel Comics character Mystique, she lamented that while Ditto was not underused in the series it was not utilized in any meaningful manner in the games compared to their external media. She went further to note that it lacked any storytelling focused around its unique abilities, or the "fundamental changes to life that relatively easy access to a shapeshifter would bring" to the setting, instead relegated to "stick it in daycare and use it to churn out eggs for you. Death by snu-snu." Henley further acknowledged that while Pokémon GO did something fundamentally different with the species, it was still more of a one-note feature, and hoped future games would do more with Ditto as a character instead.

Patricia Hernandez in an article for Polygon praised Ditto's portrayal in Detective Pikachu, noting that while the games did not explore its transformation ability in more depth, she was pleased to see how the film approached it. Specifically citing its reveal towards the end of the film, she called it not only a good sleight of hand moment but also expressed excitement to see "Ditto use its ability to the fullest" as it transformed from form to form rapidly to fight. She added that while it wasn't the strongest Pokémon in the franchise, its ability to "turn into any of them at a moment's notice, when it needs to, makes it possibly the most deadly enemy to fight", and lamented that the games never explored this aspect, instead making the character feel rather useless in the lore. Comic Book Resources' Molly Kishikawa and Fanbyte's Eric Thurm both also addressed this interpretation of the character, noting that in contrast to how the game's presented it as harmless the full scope of its ability presented horrific implications, and Thurm in particular noting that disturbing implications of Ditto being able to take on a human appearance was "a question we've all been avoiding for years".

Early on, a popular fan theory arose that Ditto was a "failed clone" of another Pokémon, Mew. Originating on social media platform Reddit in 2010, the theory was proposed due to their similar traits, such as both learning the move Transform, and Mew's history of being cloned in the franchise's lore. It was later debunked in a 2012 interview with Game Freak's Junichi Masuda for Game Informer, who stated it was the first he'd heard of such a rumor and "In terms of how Pokémon are designed, they are each their own unique living being." Despite this the rumor persisted, with Comic Book Resources writer citing it as an example of longtime fans of the franchise paying attention to minute details, as well as craving deeper complexity in the series. While Detective Pikachu's director was unaware of the theory, writer Dan Hernandez acknowledged it impacted the story of the film as they researched the characters. Stating while they didn't want to "go too much into that", it was a "provocative question" they wanted to hint at, and further allowed them to develop a connection for the audience between Ditto and another character in the film related to Mew, Mewtwo.

== See also ==
- Slime (monster)
