= Deadlight =

Deadlight or Deadlights may refer to:

== Boats ==
- Deadlight, a wood or metal shutter fastened over a ship's porthole or cabin window in stormy weather
- Deadlight, less common term for a deck prism, a porthole fixed in a ship's deck to give natural light to a hold or cabin below deck
- Operation Deadlight, a 1946 UK naval operation to scuttle German U-boats following the end of WWII

== Books ==
- Deadlight, first paranormal SF novel of Scottish novelist Archie Roy 1968
- The Deadlights, in the works of Stephen King such as It, in particular when referring to Pennywise

== Music ==
- Deadlight (album), a 2007 album by Finnish band Before the Dawn
- Deadlights (American band), 1998–2000
- Deadlights (EP), a 1996 EP by Norwegian band Gehenna
- "Deadlight", a song by Draconian from the 2011 album A Rose for the Apocalypse
- "Deadlight", a song by Sirenia from the 2023 album 1977

== Video games ==
- Deadlight (video game), a 2012 video game
