= S-Game =

Chinese video game developer

- Native name: 北京灵游坊网络科技有限公司
- Type: Private
- Industry: Video games
- Founded: 2011; 15 years ago
- Founder: Liang Qiwei
- Headquarters: Beijing, China
- Key people: Liang Qiwei (CEO)
- Products: Phantom Blade Zero
- Owner: Tencent (26.34%)

S-GAME
- Chinese: 灵游坊
Transcriptions
Standard Mandarin
- Hanyu Pinyin: Líng yóu fāng

Alternative Chinese name
- Chinese: 北京灵游坊网络科技有限公司
Transcriptions
Standard Mandarin
- Hanyu Pinyin: Běijīng líng yóu fāng wǎngluò kējì yǒuxiàn gōngsī

S-Game is a Chinese video game development and publishing company founded by Liang Qiwei in 2011. As of December 2025, S-Game is currently headquartered in Beijing, with a motion capture and animator team in Shanghai, an art team in Hong Kong, and a global publishing team in Los Angeles.

S-Game develops Wuxia action role-playing games. It is best known for developing the video game Phantom Blade Zero (2026).

== History ==
S-Game was founded in 2011 by Liang Qiwei who goes by the online alias Soulframe. The company's English name S-Game was derived from this alias. Liang completed his undergraduate studies at the School of Architecture of Tsinghua University as well graduate studies at Yale University but chose to return to China to develop video games. While he was a student, he developed his first game using RPG Maker called Rainblood: Town of Death.

The first investor of S-Game was ZhenFund which contributed RMB 1 million. In December 2011, S-Game released its first game Rainblood 2: City of Flame which was a sequel.

In January 2013, S-Game released Rainblood Chronicles: Mirage. While sales were high, the development costs rose significantly with the team size expanding to seven people leading to the game barely breaking even. At one point Liang couldn't pay salaries, leading to discussions of disbandment among team members. NetEase became a significant shareholder of S-Game and the company would focus on developing higher budget mobile games over single player games.

S-Game released its first mobile game Phantom Blade 1 using the Unity 3D engine which was a commercial success. By then S-Game had grown to 70 employees. This was followed up with the sequels Phantom Blade 2 and Phantom Blade 3 which were also commercial successes. However they were criticized as overly commercial and Pay-to-win.

In the autumn of 2021, Tencent became a significant shareholder of S-Game, owning around a 25% stake in the company. NetEase exited its position in S-Game. The next day Liang sent out an internal memo to S-Game employees announcing a five-year plan to develop two large scale game titles using Unreal Engine 5 which were Phantom Blade Zero and Stellar Saga. The latter was later shelved so the team could focus entirely on Phantom Blade Zero. Tencent would not be involved in the company operations or creative direction of the games.

In 2022 Phantom Blade Zero was officially greenlit for development. According to Liang, S-Game cut all Research and development projects as well as allocated all its funds to focus on it. Total development costs of the game was between RMB 300 million to 400 million. The game was first revealed in 2023. In January 2025, it was reported S-Game received additional funding after the success of Black Myth: Wukong. On 29 October 2026, Phantom Blade Zero was released and was both critically acclaimed as well as a commercial success.

== Games and products ==
Year	English	Chinese
2011	Rainblood 2: City of Flame	雨血2：烨城
2013	Rainblood Chronicles：Mirage	雨血前传：蜃楼
2014	Phantom Blade 1	影之刃1
2016	Phantom Blade 2	影之刃2
2021	Phantom Blade 3	影之刃3
2023	Phantom Blade: Executioners	影之刃：断罪者
2026	Phantom Blade Zero	影之刃零

== See also ==
- Game Science
