= Rebel Wolves =

Polish video game company

Rebel Wolves sp. z o.o.
- Type: Private
- Industry: Video games
- Founded: 2022; 4 years ago
- Headquarters: Warsaw, Poland
- Key people: Konrad Tomaszkiewicz (CEO); Michal Boryka (CFO); Robert Murzynowski (studio head)
- Products: The Blood of Dawnwalker
- Parent: Bandai Namco Entertainment
- Website: rebel-wolves.com

Rebel Wolves is a video game developer based in Warsaw, Poland. Founded in 2022, the studio is most known for developing the action role-playing game The Blood of Dawnwalker (2026).

== History ==
Rebel Wolves was founded in early 2022 by CEO Konrad Tomaszkiewicz following his departure from CD Projekt Red. He worked at the studio for 17 years, and while there had served as game director of the 2015 action role-playing game The Witcher 3: Wild Hunt and secondary director of the 2020 action role-playing-game Cyberpunk 2077. Many other former CD Projekt Red employees and other Polish AAA industry veterans joined the studio, with hiring ramping up following a 2022 investment by NetEase, which resulted in the Chinese technology company acquiring a 26% minority stake and Rebel Wolves securing a $40 million budget for their first project. In late 2024 it was announced Rebel Wolves had partnered with Bandai Namco Entertainment to publish the studio's debut title.

Development of the studio's debut title, The Blood of Dawnwalker, began in 2022 shortly after the studios founding and concluded in 2026. Tomaszkiewicz initially planned on a 90-person team to tackle the project, which was the size of the studio in 2024, but by the end of development the studio's headcount had increased to about 160. The team took inspiration the history, folklore, and archaeology of Eastern and Central Europe; classic role-playing games from the late 90s and early 2000s; as well as the projects the team had worked on while at CD Projekt Red.

The Blood of Dawnwalker was officially revealed on January 13, 2025. The Blood of Dawnwalker launched on September 3, 2026, and was met with favorable reviews, with more than 1 million copies sold within two days. Tomaszkiewicz has expressed a desire to revisit the IP with subsequent titles as part of a broader saga, while also creating new IPs to reduce burnout at the studio.

== Games developed ==
| Year | Title | Platform(s) | Publisher |
|---|---|---|---|
| 2026 | The Blood of Dawnwalker | PlayStation 5, Windows, Xbox Series X/S | Bandai Namco |
