= Strago Magus =

Fictional character in Final Fantasy VI

- Final Fantasy character
- Artwork of Strago by Yoshitaka Amano for Final Fantasy VI
- First game: Final Fantasy VI (1994)
- Created by: Akiyoshi Ohta
- Designed by: Tetsuya Nomura (preliminary); Yoshitaka Amano; Kazuko Shibuya (sprites)
- Voiced by: Kenichi Ogata

Strago Magus, known in Japan as Stragos Magus (Japanese: ストラゴス・マゴス, Hepburn: Sutoragosu Magosu), is a character introduced in the 1994 role-playing video game Final Fantasy VI by Square Enix. Created by Akiyoshi Ohta, Strago is a Blue Mage, a recurring character class in the Final Fantasy franchise that fights using magical abilities learned from enemy monsters. A descendant of warriors in a past tragedy, Strago tends for his granddaughter Relm Arrowny and later joins the protagonists to ensure that same tragedy does not repeat. He has since appeared in other games related to the Final Fantasy franchise, including Dissidia Final Fantasy Opera Omnia, where he is voiced by Kenichi Ogata.

Strago received mixed reception, regarded as a filler character and cited as an example of the development team's difficulty in juggling such a large cast. However, his caring for Relm in a harsh world received praise, especially in light of cut content related to the character. He was additionally observed through not only the scope of his role as an elderly figure among the game's cast and the narrative possibilities it represented but also the view on Japanese culture and their own approach to family structure.

== Appearances ==
Strago Magus is character in the 1994 Square Enix video game Final Fantasy VI, classified as a Blue Mage, a recurring type of magical user in the Final Fantasy franchise that can learn and use certain abilities from enemy monsters. An elderly gentleman living in the village of Thamasa, he is the adoptive grandfather of the character Relm Arrowny and a descendant of the warriors who fought in the War of the Magi, a battle that occurred long before the events of the game but relates heavily to its central plot. He initially hides his magical ability until the protagonists rescue Relm from a fire, and he accompanies them in their goal to discover the home of the espers, a race of magical beings. Upon discovery that the game's antagonist, the Gestahlian Empire, is enslaving espers for their magic, he fears a repeat of the War of the Magi and both he and Relm join the party fully to stop the Empire's ambitions.

Later in the game's second half, after the world has been devastated and the party separated, Strago believes Relm to have died and falls in with a group of cultists, becoming lethargic and unresponsive. However, if the party rescues Relm and brings her to him, he snaps out of his stupor and rejoins the group. Later he discovers a longtime friend of his was seriously injured by a monster the two had hunted when they were young men. Traveling to the monster's last known location at Ebot's Rock, Strago faces and defeats it with the party's help, and learns its unique attack "Grand Delta".

In other games, he is additionally a playable character in Final Fantasy Record Keeper and Dissidia Final Fantasy Opera Omnia, where in the latter he is voiced by Kenichi Ogata. Outside of video games, cards representing Strago have been produced for the Final Fantasy Trading Card Game and Magic: The Gathering. A keychain figure based on his chibi artwork was also produced by Bandai, as part of a series to promote the release of Final Fantasy VI.

== Conception and design ==
Nomura's art of Strago, Relm, and Lara. Strago differed slightly from his final design, while Lara was cut from the game entirely

Final Fantasy VI was developed with the mindset that none of the playable cast was the protagonist, and that each of them were equally the "main character". The cast of characters were selected from submissions from across the development team, with game planner Akiyoshi Ohta choosing Relm and her related characters. Once the cast was selected, each individual would write their character's story, with Yoshinori Kitase balancing the plot as things developed. Relm is not a blood relative of Strago, but the daughter of a friend he took in. Regardless, his personality is established as heavily doting on her, while acting as an "elder" figure to the rest of the group. In Japanese his name was originally Stragos, shortened in English localizations due to issues with name lengths in the original Western releases.

Standing 151 centimetres (4 ft 11 1/2 in) tall, an early draft of the character's appearance was drawn by Tetsuya Nomura, while Yoshitaka Amano was commissioned to design the characters from the brief outlines provided. Given full creative freedom, Amano wanted to make "real" and "alive" characters, though with consideration for their representation in-game as small computer sprites. Amano's concepts for Strago were converted into sprite form by Kazuko Shibuya who had been acting as an intermediary between Amano and the development team, as the character's artwork was completed early in the game's development process. Strago appears as a short, elderly man with a white beard and mohawk, a cape, a red tanktop, and patterned pants that are puffed towards the lower legs.

Several other elements of Strago's character were also cut. A scene was originally intended between himself and the character Shadow, where Strago would confront him in one of the game's inn locations and ask to see his face to confirm his actual identity, after which they would drink together. Another concept that was also removed involved Strago rebuilding a village. Intended as a city-building mini-game "similar to SimCity", it was conceived early in the planning stages of Final Fantasy VI but cut due to issues with the development schedule. Lastly, Strago was also intended to have a wife who would have also been a playable character. Named Lara, she was defined as a Geomancer-type mage, and would have bickered with Strago about which of two of them would die first, though at the same were intended to be "a good couple that protected each other".

== Critical reception ==
Strago received mixed reception. Mike Minotti of VentureBeat cited him as an example of a "filler character" commonly found in roleplaying games that players often cared little about. On the other hand, Japanese musician Kenichi Maeyamada in an article for 4Gamer.net cited Strago's emotional downfall as one of the game's darkest moments, illustrating personal trauma at the believed loss of his granddaughter and friends in a manner that left him astounded. The staff of RPGFan meanwhile felt Strago's return to the party was a bit shallow by comparison, and cited him as an example of how Final Fantasy VI's large cast caused certain characters to regrettably have little fleshed-out content.

In contrast, Patrick Holleman in the book Reverse Design: Final Fantasy VI observed that despite being such a late-game addition to the party he had quite a large amount of dialogue, often providing exposition to events that happened prior to the game's story and how they were relevant to it. However, his introduction to the party by comparison was rather brief, and Holleman felt that was the reason behind the Ebot's Rock quest, as few if any of the party members got a second quest. Additionally Holleman felt the quest tapped into another aspect of Strago's character: his age. As an older character, it was easier for the development team to portray him with hidden depth and a more fleshed out backstory, something that in his point of view wasn't as easy to do with characters in their teens.

=== Analysis of themes and music ===
Unlike other characters' themes which convey character elements during scenes, writer Sebastian Deken saw Strago's as atmospheric. However he emphasized this in turn created a sense of suspicion, which directly relates to Strago's secretive nature.

In the book The Legend of Final Fantasy VI, Pierre Maugein described him as "the third piece in the emotional family puzzle" in the game that consists of himself, Relm and Shadow. Acting as a paternal figure to Relm, Maugein stated that while his role as a substitute father could be read as often kowtowing to her aggressive nature, he felt Strago was instead trying to offer support and understanding for her difficult past and her need for confrontation. When observing the cut character of his wife, Maugein felt the development team was consciously trying to avoid a support structure that would have lightened the game's overall mood by not including her. Instead the emphasis on Strago as her sole guardian helped paint a picture of survival in a harsh world, and underlined their tragic family experiences.

Maugein also observed how Strago's age is represented in the game, not only through how completion of his personal quest revitalizes him emotionally, but also how easily his despair led him into the Cult of Kefka when he thought Relm had died. He saw that particular moment as an old man that has given up, accepting his approaching death instead of trying to find the energy to keep going. Calling him "sweet in his quirks and his role as a wise but clumsy forebear", Maugein felt that his liveliness hid a personal struggle, something he saw reflected in the removed cutscene with Shadow. Strago to him also represented a view on the elderly in Japanese culture with how grandparents are often at the center of the family in contrast to Western society, an "oft-times tiresome, old man who still provokes deep respect" that reflected Relm's "acerbity" that represented a shift in the Japanese use away from such paradigms. He closed with stating that more than any other character in the game, Strago represented "living for a loved one is a profound act of resistance".

Other books also examined the character. Sebastian Deken in his book discussing Final Fantasy VI's characters and how their music related to them noted that while Strago's was more atmospheric, it still reflected his secretive nature. The book Final Fantasy and Philosophy meanwhile cited Strago's eccentricities as an example of a prevailing theme in literature of positive portrayals of madness.
